= Bear Swamp (disambiguation) =

Bear Swamp is a park and open space reserve in Ashfield, Massachusetts.

Bear Swamp may also refer to the following:

- Bear Swamp, Florida, part of the Ocala National Forest, in Florida
- Bear Swamp, New Jersey, an old growth forest in Cumberland County, New Jersey
- Bear Swamp, Sussex County, New Jersey, feeds Lake Owassa and Culvers Lake, in Sussex County, New Jersey (now a Wildlife Management Area, including the Culvermere property and former Beardall properties).
- Bear Swamp Hydroelectric Power Station, located in Massachusetts near the Deerfield River
- Bear Swamp Preserve, a national natural landmark in Westerlo, New York
