= Rockland Country Day School =

Location
- 34 Kings Highway; Congers, New York 10920; United States
- Coordinates: 41.1482°N 73.9458°W

Information
- School type: Private
- Motto: E Radicibus Fortibus Floremus (From Strong Roots We Flourish)
- Established: 1959
- Status: closed
- Oversight: Board of Trustees
- CEEB code: 335281
- Grades: PreK-12
- Enrollment: 1
- Campus: Former Farm with Organic Garden and Forest
- Campus size: 20 acres (81,000 m^{2})
- Colours: Green and White
- Nickname: RCDS
- Team name: Cougars
- Accreditation: New York State Association of Independent Schools
- Yearbook: Yes
- Affiliation: None
- Website: http://www.rocklandcds.org

Rockland Country Day School was a private coed college-preparatory school that served students in Pre-K through 12th grade. It was located in Congers, New York and was founded in 1959 as an alternative to public education in Rockland County. The school's stated mission was to "[bring] forth the best in every student by knowing and educating each of them as an individual." In 2019 the school was to have celebrated its 60th anniversary, but on August 20, 2019, the school announced it would be closing.

== History ==
The Rockland Country Day School was established in 1959 by a group of local community leaders including Pem McCurdy and Kendall Pennypacker, led by Prof. Charles Frankel of Columbia University. Originally located in South Nyack, New York, the school moved to Congers, New York when it outgrew its original location. The Congers location was sold to the Town of Clarkstown and the school leased the property back for a five-year term, however in August 2019, the school announced it would close due to declining enrollment and fiscal challenges.

== Curriculum ==
RCDS focuses on an individualized approach to education for each of its students. The Pre-K through Grade 12 curriculum offered a variety of academics, arts and inquiry, with multi-age classes and opportunities for mentorship and leadership across the grades. They had relatively small classes, with a roughly 7-to-1 student-to-teacher ratio.

== Notable alumni ==
- Ken Be, lutist
- Han-na Chang, cellist
- Tyne Daly, actress
- Adam Gussow, author and blues harmonica player
- Isabelle McCalla, actress
- Lea Michele, singer/actress
- Ezra Miller, actor
- Keith Raniere, founder of self-improvement organization NXIVM and a convicted felon
- Johanna Rose, singer and founding member of Anonymous 4
- Sebastian Stan, actor
- Grace VanderWaal, singer/actress
