= Congers, New York =

- Census-designated place
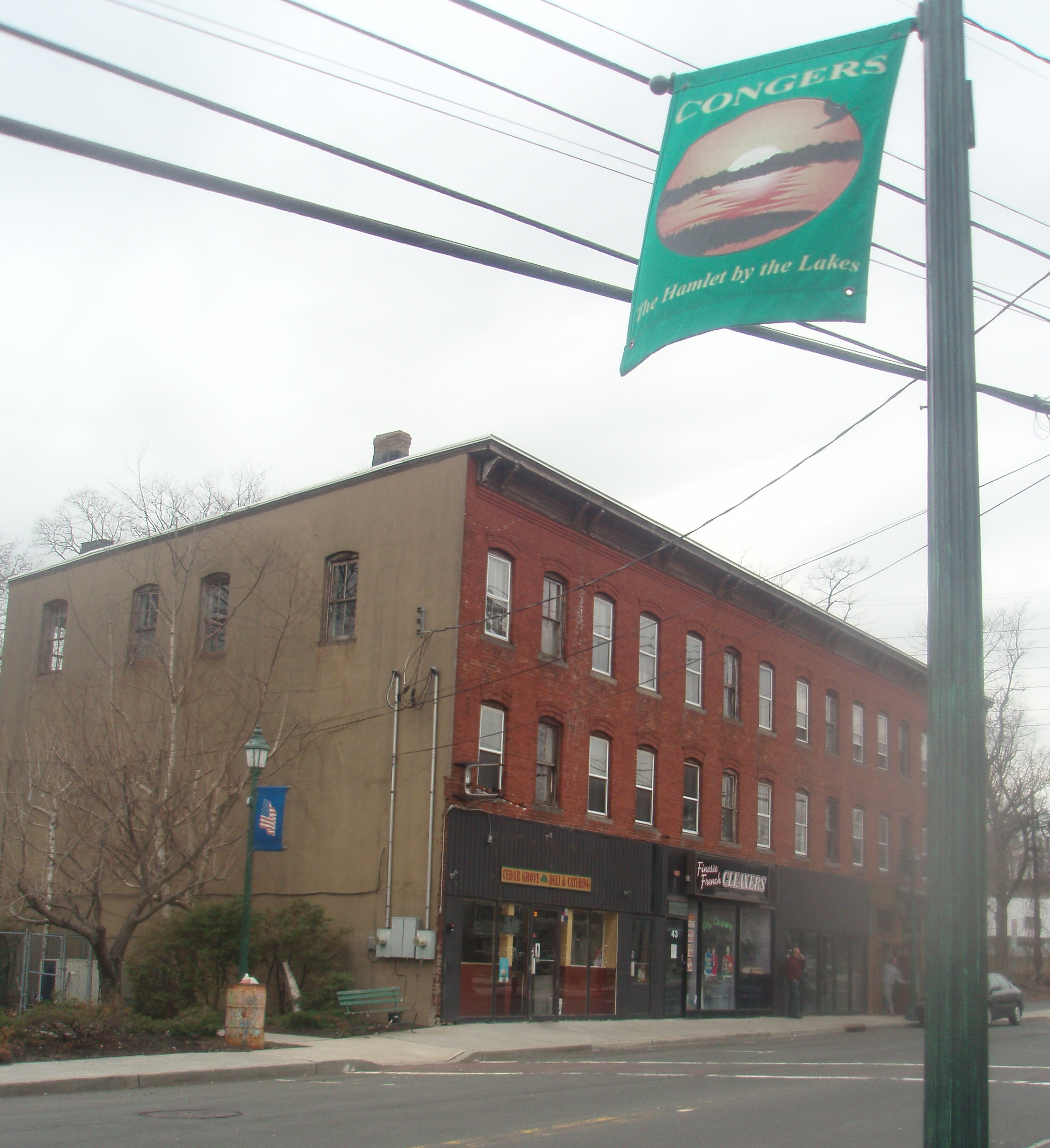
- Nicknames: The Hamlet by the Lakes, C Hood
- Location in Rockland County and the state of New York

- Location within the state of New York
- Coordinates: 41°8′47″N 73°56′39″W
- Country: United States
- State: New York
- County: Rockland
- Town: Clarkstown

Area
  - Total: 3.93 sq mi (10.18 km^{2})
  - Land: 3.19 sq mi (8.25 km^{2})
  - Water: 0.75 sq mi (1.93 km^{2})
- Elevation: 177 ft (54 m)

Population (2020)
  - Total: 8,532
  - Density: 2,678.7/sq mi (1,034.25/km^{2})
- Time zone: UTC-5 (EST)
  - Summer (DST): UTC-4 (EDT)
- ZIP code: 10920
- Area code: 845
- FIPS code: 36-17739
- GNIS feature ID: 0947282

Congers (English pronunciation: /ˈkɒŋgəɹz/) is a suburban hamlet and census-designated place in the town of Clarkstown, Rockland County, New York, United States. It is located north of Valley Cottage, east of New City, across Lake DeForest, south of Haverstraw, and west of the Hudson River. It lies 19 miles (31 km) north of New York City's Bronx boundary. As of the 2020 census, the population was 8,532.

== Geography ==
Congers is located at 41°8′47″N 73°56′39″W (41.146445, −73.944036).

According to the United States Census Bureau, the CDP has a total area of 3.9 square miles (10 km^{2}), of which 3.2 square miles (8.3 km^{2}) is land and 0.7 square miles (1.8 km^{2}) (18.39%) is water. The high percentage of Congers that sits under water is due to the hamlet's emplacement within and between four lakes: Congers Lake, Rockland Lake, Swartwout (also Swarthout) Lake, and the county reservoir, Lake DeForest. Congers is adjacent to Rockland Lake State Park, along the Hudson River.

== Demographics ==
Historical population
| Census | Pop. | Note | %± |
|---|---|---|---|
| 1980 | 7,123 | | — |
| 1990 | 8,003 | | 12.4% |
| 2000 | 8,303 | | 3.7% |
| 2010 | 8,363 | | 0.7% |
| 2020 | 8,532 | | 2.0% |
U.S. Decennial Census

=== 2020 census ===
As of the 2020 census, Congers had a population of 8,532. The median age was 44.1 years. 20.3% of residents were under the age of 18 and 19.3% of residents were 65 years of age or older. For every 100 females there were 93.6 males, and for every 100 females age 18 and over there were 92.4 males age 18 and over.

100.0% of residents lived in urban areas, while 0.0% lived in rural areas.

There were 2,850 households in Congers, of which 34.5% had children under the age of 18 living in them. Of all households, 64.7% were married-couple households, 10.5% were households with a male householder and no spouse or partner present, and 20.5% were households with a female householder and no spouse or partner present. About 16.2% of all households were made up of individuals and 8.1% had someone living alone who was 65 years of age or older.

There were 2,946 housing units, of which 3.3% were vacant. The homeowner vacancy rate was 0.4% and the rental vacancy rate was 4.4%.

Racial composition as of the 2020 census
| Race | Number | Percent |
|---|---|---|
| White | 5,646 | 66.2% |
| Black or African American | 369 | 4.3% |
| American Indian and Alaska Native | 26 | 0.3% |
| Asian | 1,147 | 13.4% |
| Native Hawaiian and Other Pacific Islander | 0 | 0.0% |
| Some other race | 554 | 6.5% |
| Two or more races | 790 | 9.3% |
| Hispanic or Latino (of any race) | 1,427 | 16.7% |

=== 2000 census ===
As of the 2000 census, there were 8,303 people, 2,695 households, and 2,244 families residing in the CDP. The population density was 2,635.9 inhabitants per square mile (1,017.7/km^{2}). There were 2,743 housing units at an average density of 870.8 per square mile (336.2/km^{2}). The racial makeup of the CDP was 85.2% White, 1.8% African American, 0.2% Native American, 8.6% Asian, 0.1% Pacific Islander, 2.1% from other races, and 2.0% from two or more races. Hispanic or Latino people of any race were 7.6% of the population.

There were 2,695 households, out of which 40.6% had children under the age of 18 living with them, 70.3% were married couples living together, 9.5% had a female householder with no husband present, and 16.7% were non-families. 13.3% of all households were made up of individuals, and 5.1% had someone living alone who was 65 years of age or older. The average household size was 3.05 and the average family size was 3.36. In the CDP, the population was spread out, with 26.1% under the age of 18, 6.9% from 18 to 24, 29.7% from 25 to 44, 26.6% from 45 to 64, and 10.7% who were 65 years of age or older. The median age was 38 years. For every 100 females, there were 95.4 males. For every 100 females age 18 and over, there were 93.6 males.

== History ==
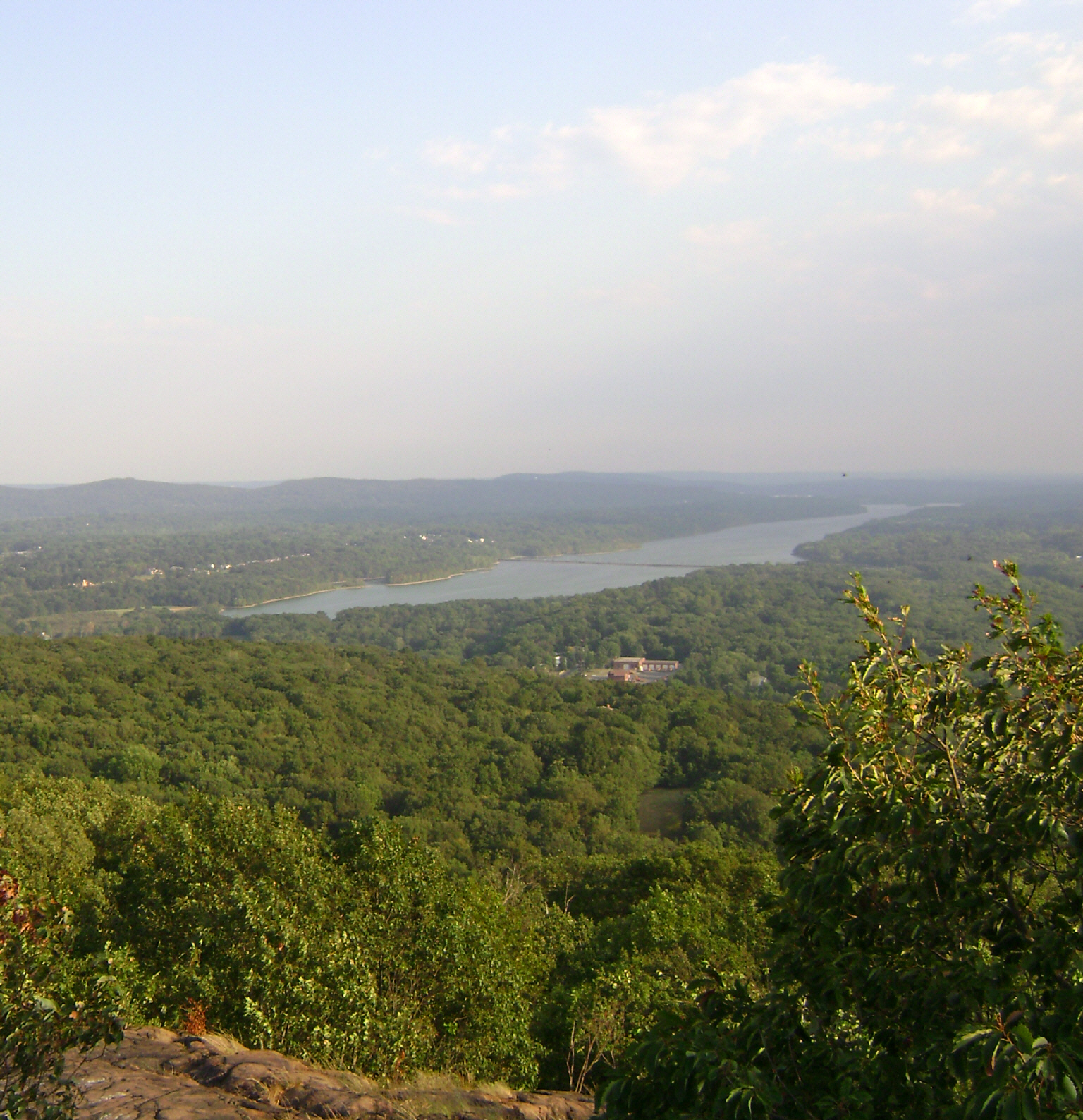
Lake DeForest is a reservoir that was built in 1956, and can hold over 5 billion gallons of fresh water

Congers was settled in the late 17th century by Dutch, German and English settlers. It was known as Cedar Grove Corner and then Waldberg, which in German means "forest mountain". It is named after New York State Senator Abraham Bogart Conger (1814 - 1887).

In the 19th century the Congers railroad station, three churches, a school, the firehouse and the Central and Globe hotels were built. The first floor of the then Globe hotel on the southeastern corner of Congers Road is presently the Last Chance Saloon. The Clarktown Dutch Reformed Church still stands at the corner of Congers Road and Kings Highway.

Kings Highway was the first major road in the county and for many years the only road from New York to Albany.

Nine structures in Congers have recognized historical markers dating back to the 18th century, including the DeBaum House on Kings Highway, the Smith House on Gilchrest Road and the Snedeker House, where the George Washington is believed to have spent a night in his role as commander-in-chief of Colonial forces during the American Revolution.

The Swartout estate, which was occupied by George Swartout, was part of a large tract of land confiscated by the government about 1777. It was purchased by General Jacobus Swartwout, who was a top ally of Washington, and member of a family who traced their residence in Rockland County to 1660.

Lake DeForest, a reservoir with a capacity of over 5 billion gallons, was built in 1955-1956. It is named after Henry L. Deforest, President of the Spring Valley Works and Supply Company.

Several roads are named after Union Civil War generals, including Grant, Burnside, Sheridan, Sherman, and Rosecrans avenues.

A memorial in honor of 1st Lieutenant Raymond B. Jauss is located at the park adjacent to the railroad crossing at the center of town. Jauss received a Distinguished Service Cross for his actions in World War I, and was killed on July 15, 1918 near Crezancy, France. He was a graduate of Columbia University and his family had a summer home in Congers. Jauss was married to a childhood sweetheart - and fellow Congers resident - Harriet James; their wedding occurred two days before he sailed for Europe.

Congers had regular passenger train service along the New York Central Railroad's West Shore Railroad from Weehawken, New Jersey (opposite Midtown Manhattan) north to Newburgh, Kingston and Albany until 1958. A shortened commuter service continued to West Haverstraw until 1959.

=== St Paul's Church ===
Catholics in Congers initially attended St. Peter's Church in Haverstraw. Rev. Thomas McGare of St. Peter's built St Paul's Church, Clarkstown's first Catholic church, on Lake Road in the early 1890s. In 1901 Rev. John A. Nageleisen built mission stations in Rockland Lake, Bardonia, and New City.

== Education ==
Congers has one public elementary school, Lakewood Elementary. Congers Elementary School was shut down in 2013 due to unsafe cracks in the structure. Today the building remains as a day care facility. Public school students from Congers attend Felix Festa Middle School in West Nyack and Clarkstown North High School in New City. Congers is also the home of Rockland Country Day School, which accepts students in grades PreK-12 and was founded in 1959.

== Sports ==
The New York Raiders are a semi-professional rugby league football team that currently plays in the American National Rugby League (AMNRL) competition. They play their home games at Rockland Lake State Park, and are a team partner of the Canberra Raiders of Australia's National Rugby League (NRL).

== Tourism ==
=== Historical markers ===
- Congers Lake Dam – Gilchrest Road
- Congers School – 9 Lake Road
- Congers Station – Lake Road & Burnside Avenue
- Dr. Davies Farm – Dr. Davies Road off Route 9W
- Kings Highway – Kings Highway & Congers Road
- Kings Highway & the Long Clove – Old Haverstraw Road
- Paul Farmhouse – Gilchrest Road
- Snedeker Farm – 74 Endicott Street
- Snedeker Landing – Route 9W & Long Clove Roads
- St. Paul's Church – Lake Road at the church

=== Landmarks and places of interest ===
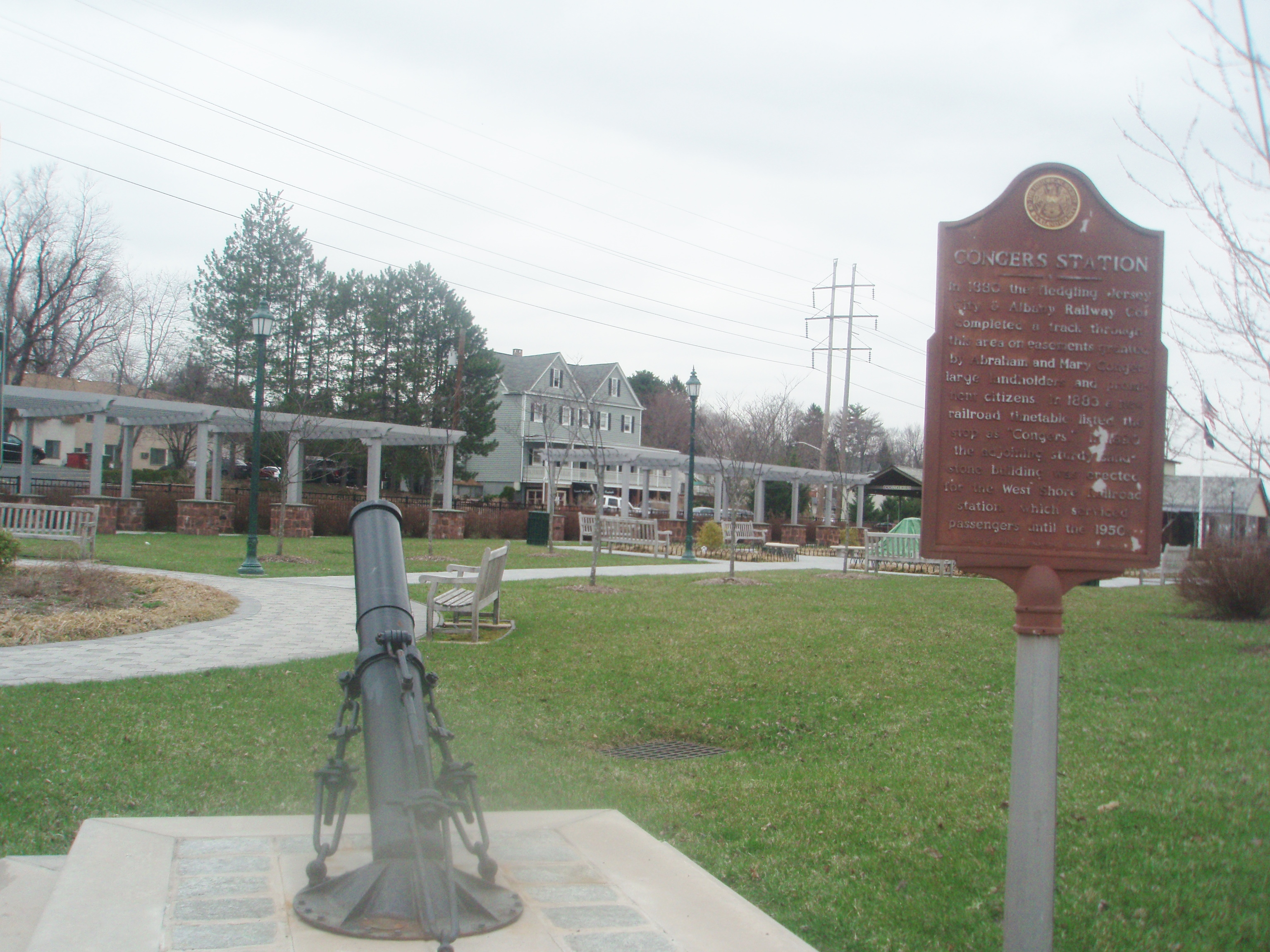
Historic Congers Railroad Station of the West Shore Railroad and Park

- Congers Historical Museum – Second floor of the century-old Congers Railroad Station Park building – Lake Road and Burnside Avenue
- Congers United Methodist Church – On April 3, 1831, Easter Sunday, the first service was held. The congregation consisted of Presbyterians and former members of the Dutch Reformed Church. Originally, the Congers Church was named the Waldberg Dutch Reformed Church. In 1968, the Evangelical United Brethren Church merged with the Methodist Church and became known as the United Methodist Church. The church's 175th anniversary was celebrated in 2006.

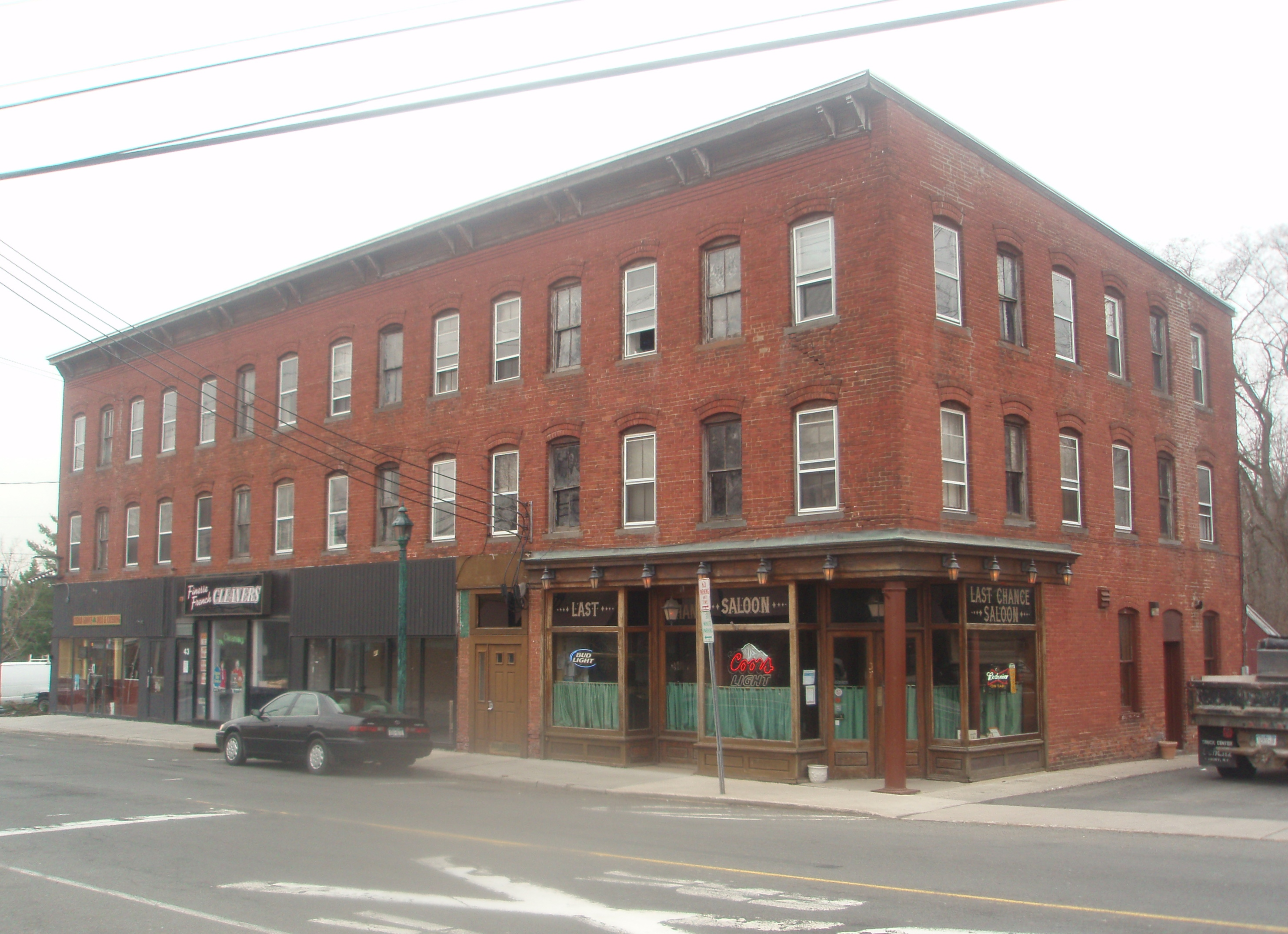
Historic building in central Congers

- Dr. Davies Farm – The farmhouse, part of a 450-acre (1.8 km^{2}) farm that ran from Rockland Lake to the Hudson River, was built in 1836 and is of the early frontier Federalist style. In 1891 Arthur B. Davies and Dr. Lucy Meriwether married and purchased what is now the Davies home farm for $6500.00. Lucy Virginia Meriweather Davies, M.D., was a relative of Meriwether Lewis (of the Lewis and Clark Expedition) and a general practitioner who, in her time, delivered a significant part of Rockland's population: 7,000 babies. She also farmed the land which her descendants operate today. In 2007 the present Davies owners gave 6 to 8 acres (2.4 to 3.2 ha) of its property to the Rockland Center for the Arts (RoCA) of West Nyack, New York.
- Rockland Lake Museum – Rockland Lake State Park – Open all year, but call the office in advance to make sure someone can unlock the room in which the exhibit is contained. Free. There are exhibits relating to the local ice industry and community life in Rockland Lake Village, including ice harvesting tools.
- Self-Transcendence Marathon – Held the last week of August at Rockland Lake State Park
- Congers Lake Trailway – Opened 2011
- Congers Lake West Trailway and Boardwalk – Opened October 2013. Combined trailway is approximately 2.6 miles around Congers Lake.

== Notable people ==
- Will Cunnane, Former Major League Baseball player
- Brian Fechino, musician and music producer
- Mark Fergus, screenwriter and director, known for the movie Iron Man
- Edward R. Gleason Jr, Chief of Palisades Interstate Park Police; died in the line of duty
- Adam Gussow, writer, professor, and blues harmonica player, and former member of the duo Satan and Adam
- Leonidas Hubbard, Jr and Mina Benson Hubbard, writers and explorers of Canada; lived for about two years on Friend Street
- Amy Leventer, marine biologist, micropaleontologist, Antarctic researcher
- James Maritato, professional wrestler
- Chris O'Grady, former relief pitcher for the Miami Marlins
- Hayden Panettiere, actress, singer, model; attended Congers Elementary School
- Dan Pasqua, Major League Baseball player, drafted by the New York Yankees in 1982
- Sebastian Stan, Romanian-American actor; attended Rockland Country Day School
- Tracy Wolfson, sportscaster for CBS Sports
- Abbey Levy (born 2000), professional ice hockey goaltender for the New York Sirens
- Sheridan Rúitín, celtic folk music group, founded in Congers
