= Harlem Blues =

Harlem Blues is a song written by W. C. Handy

It may also refer to:

- Harlem Blues (Donald Byrd album), a 1988 album featuring the above composition
- Harlem Blues (Phineas Newborn Jr. album), an album by pianist Phineas Newborn Jr. recorded in 1969 and released in 1975
- Harlem Blues (Satan and Adam album), an album by Satan and Adam, released in 1991
