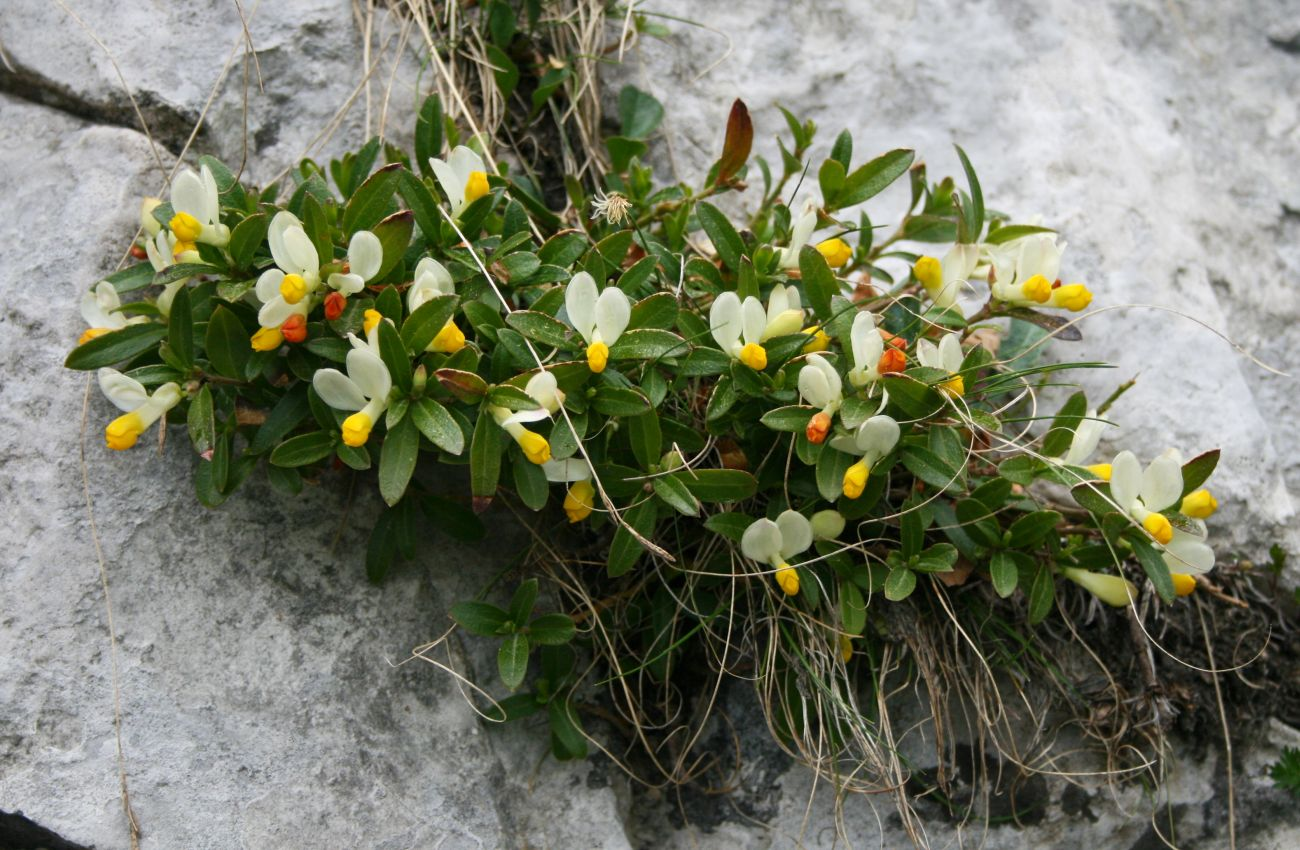

Scientific classification
- Kingdom: Plantae
- Clade: Tracheophytes
- Clade: Angiosperms
- Clade: Eudicots
- Clade: Rosids
- Order: Fabales
- Family: Polygalaceae
- Genus: Chamaebuxus
- Species: C. alpestris

Binomial name
- Chamaebuxus alpestris Spach

Synonyms
- Chamaebuxus coriacea Opiz, nom. superfl.; Chamaebuxus polygaleoides Schur, nom. superfl.; Chamaebuxus vulgaris Schur; Chamaebuxus unguiculata (Poir.) J.F.B.Pastore; Polygala buxifolia St.-Lag.; Polygala chamaebuxus L.; Polygala unguiculata Poir. (the correct specific epithet to be updated); Polygaloides chamaebuxus (L.) O.Schwarz; Chamaebuxus polygaloides Schur; Tertria chamaebuxus (L.) Schrank

= Chamaebuxus alpestris =

Species of shrub

Chamaebuxus alpestris, synonyms including Polygaloides chamaebuxus, Polygala chamaebuxus, the shrubby milkwort, is an ornamental plant in the family Polygalaceae.

== Description ==
Its flowers are solitary or in pairs in the leaf axils. The inner two sepals, the wings, are upright and white to yellow, sometimes pinkish or purple. The keel petals are bright yellow, aging to brownish-red or purple.

== Taxonomy ==
The species was first described by Carl Linnaeus in 1753 as Polygala chamaebuxus. In 2011, John Richard Abbott divided up part of the genus Polygala into more sharply defined genera. He placed P. chamaebuxus in Polygaloides as Polygaloides chamaebuxus, a species name first published in 1949. In 2024, it was shown that the genus name Polygaloides was superfluous (nom. superfl.), the correct genus name when segregated from Polygala being Chamaebuxus. As the combination of an identical genus name and specific epithet is not allowed by the International Code of Nomenclature for algae, fungi, and plants, an older name, Chamaebuxus alpestris, published by Édouard Spach in 1838 was used.

In 2025, it was argued that there was an older specific epithet than Spach's alpestris, namely unguiculata in the name Polygala unguiculata published by Poiret in 1804, so the correct name for the species should be Chamaebuxus unguiculata (Poir.) J.F.B.Pastore. As of November 2025, the name appears in the International Plant Names Index but was not updated yet in Plants of the World Online.

== Distribution ==
It is native to the Alps and the mountains of west-central and southern Europe.

== Cultivation ==
It was known to be grown in cultivation in about 1658 and was illustrated by Carolus Clusius. It has been given the Royal Horticultural Society's Award of Garden Merit. Several cultivars are also cultivated for garden use, including 'Grandiflora', whose flowers are purple-red and yellow.

The plants are hardy, forming low-lying clumps up to 6 inches (15 cm) high and 20 inches (51 cm) in diameter. They may be propagated from softwood cuttings taken in early in the growing season. Some varieties grow best in ericaceous conditions.

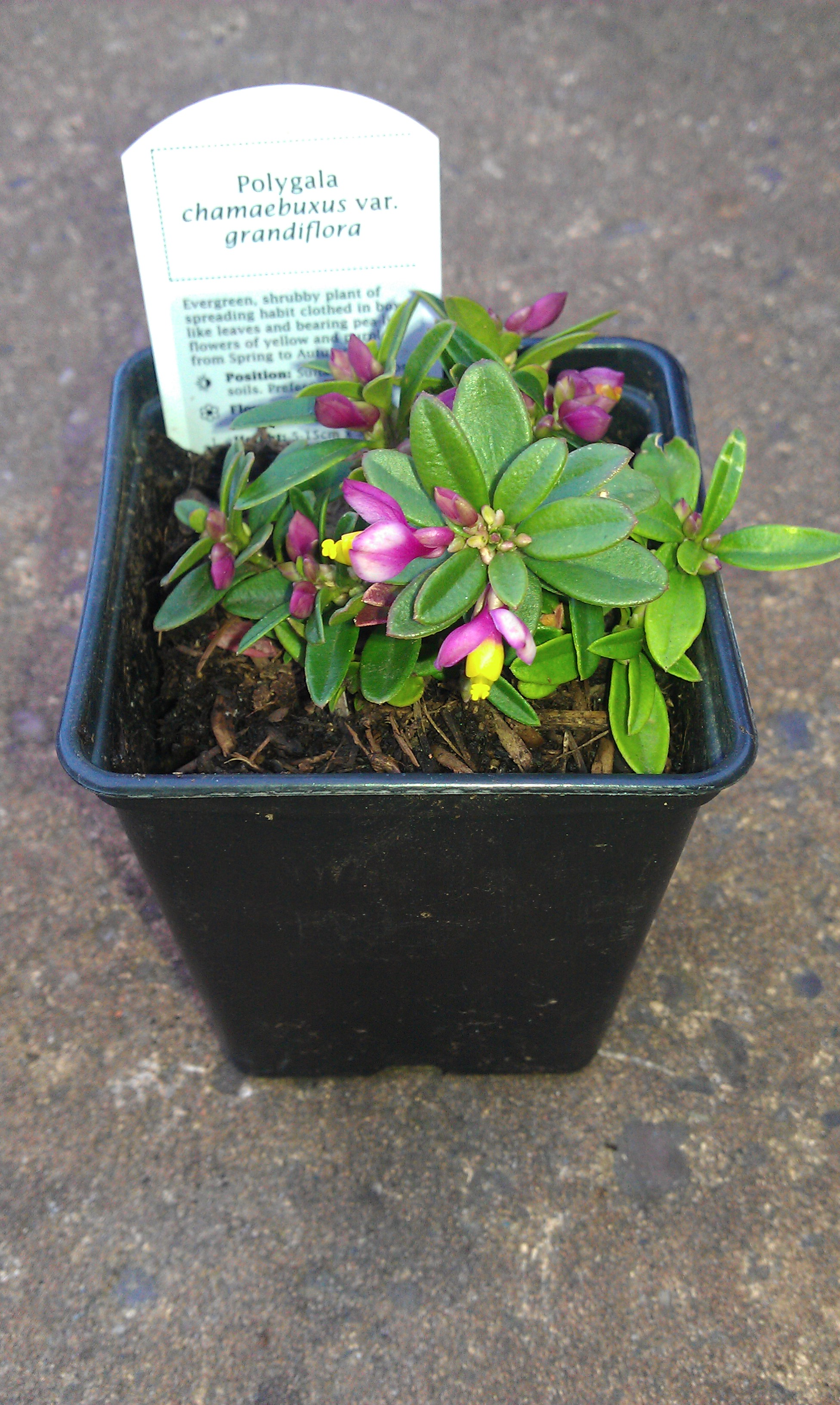
A pot of the commercially sold cultivar 'Grandiflora'
