= Bergen-Byron Swamp =

Swamp in New York, United States

- Interactive map of Bergen-Byron Swamp
- Location: Byron / Bergen, New York, United States
- Nearest city: Batavia, New York
- Coordinates: 43.102222°N 78.016111°W
- Area: 2,000 acres (8.1 km^{2})
- Established: 1935
- Governing body: Bergen Swamp Preservation Society

U.S. National Natural Landmark
- Designated: March 1964

The Bergen-Byron Swamp is a protected 2,000-acre (810 ha) swamp and nature preserve located in the towns of Byron and Bergen, New York. It is over 10,000 years old. The Bergen Swamp Preservation Society was formed in 1935 to protect and preserve this delicate ecological environment.

It was designated a National Natural Landmark in 1964, the first such site to be designated.

== Flora and fauna ==
A list of all some of the most common organisms in the swamp are as follows:

- Beech tree
- Black rat snake
- Black huckleberry
- Cardinal flower
- Cinnamon fern
- Coal skink lizard
- Death angel
- Dog-tooth violets
- Eastern massasauga rattlesnake
- Emerald swallowtail
- Gay wings
- Green snake
- Hine's emerald dragonfly
- Honeysuckle
- Jack-in-the-pulpit
- Marsh marigold
- Milkweeds
- Purple pitcher plant
- Queen snake
- Red salamander
- Ribbon snake
- Spotted turtle
- White ash tree
- White-tailed deer
- Wolf spider
- Woodcock

== Visiting ==
Individuals may visit, but groups need to ask permission first.

== See also ==
- List of National Natural Landmarks in New York
