= Nat Riddles =

American musician

Nathan Riddles (February 4, 1952 – August 11, 1991) was an American blues harmonica player based in New York City.

== Biography ==
Riddles played as an accompanist with Larry Johnson, Screamin' Jay Hawkins, and Bill Dicey. He appears on several albums with Johnson, and released a solo album on Spivey Records entitled The Artistry of Nat Riddles. Riddles also gave lessons to fellow New York harmonica player Adam Gussow of Satan and Adam.

Riddles died on August 11, 1991 in Richmond, Virginia, aged 39.

In 2007, the Modern Blues Harmonica label issued a compilation album of Riddles, entitled El Cafe Street Live!

== Bibliography ==
- Gussow, Adam - Mister Satan's Apprentice: A Blues Memoir (Pantheon Books, 1998). ISBN 9780679450221
