= Moss Island =

Island in Little Falls, New York

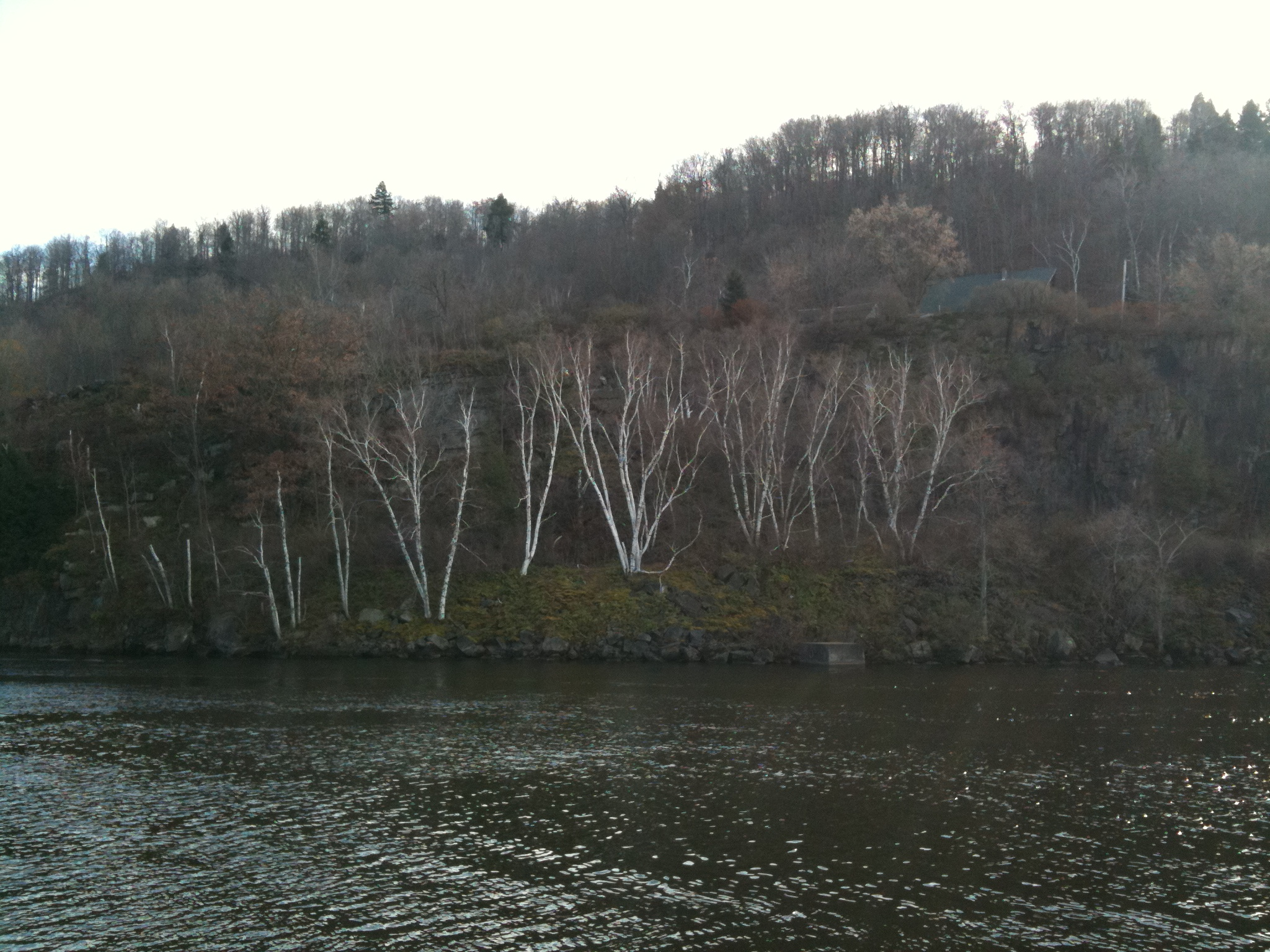
- Moss Island in 2010

- Location within New York

Geography
- Location: Mohawk River, New York State Barge Canal
- Coordinates: 43°02′23″N 74°50′53″W
- Area: 14 acres (5.7 ha)
- Length: 1,500 ft (460 m)
- Width: 625 ft (190.5 m)

Administration
- United States
- State: New York
- County: Herkimer County
- City: Little Falls, New York

U.S. National Natural Landmark
- Designated: 1976

Moss Island is an island in Little Falls, New York, located between the Mohawk River and the New York State Barge Canal. It is composed of an igneous intrusion of syenite, and became an island when canal locks were built so boats could avoid the 40-foot (12 m) falls. It is known for its large 40–50-foot (12–15 m) deep potholes as well as being popular with local rock climbers. It was declared a National Natural Landmark in 1976. Efforts by the local community to turn Moss Island into a New York State Park were begun in 2008.

== Description ==
Moss Island is 1,500 feet (460 m) long and 625 feet (191 m) wide. It is bordered by the Mohawk River on the north and the New York State Barge Canal to the south. It is covered in dwarf oak trees. Glacial striations are visible in some places. The southern cliff at its highest point is 45 feet (14 m) tall. The cliff has an adjacent road and spans about three-quarters of the island.

== Geology ==
The cliffs of Moss Island are composed of metasyenite. Syenite is an igneous rock, similar to granite, composed of alkali feldspar (a continuous mixture from KAlSi3O8 to NaAlSi3O8), and plagioclase feldspar (a mixture from CaAl2Si2O8 to NaAlSi3O8), with small quantities of muscovite (common, white or potash mica), biotitic (black mica, an iron rich version of muscovite), and hornblende (a black to dark green crystal mixture of calcium-iron-magnesium silicate, aluminum-iron-magnesium silicate and iron-magnesium silicate) and little to no quartz (SiO2). The prefix "meta-" indicates that metasyenite is a metamorphic rock. After forming as an igneous rock, the syenite was subject to massive heat and pressure, which caused the minerals to rearrange, but not melt.

== History ==
The first locks around the waterfall were created in 1793. A dry 19th century Erie Canal lock (Enlarged Erie Canal Lock #36) is located next to the southeastern service road. The current Lock 17 is one of the tallest locks of its type in the world and the largest in the New York State Barge Canal system. The lock uses a guillotine gate on its eastern side.

In 1974, the New York State Thruway was planning to build a bridge over Moss Island, but after negative publicity, it was rerouted around the island.

== Recreation ==
Moss Island is known for its rock climbing. It also provides access to disabled fishermen. The island connects to Lock 17, and its operation can be viewed from the island. A walkway next to the guillotine gate is available to cross the canal. Admission to parking, the lock and Moss Island is free. The island is known for its circular rock formations, and the opposing side of the island is a popular rock climbing cliff.

=== Rock climbing ===
Moss Island is frequently referred to as an outdoor gym. With a huge range of very easy to very hard climbs, and a very short approach, Moss Island is a convenient place to climb. From the base, it's no more than a 5 minute walk to set up an anchor. The cliffs are clean and offer protection, with over 100 established routes ranging from 5.1 to 5.13. Many more popular routes are bolted for top rope. Goat Crack (5.2), a 45-foot (14 m) slab, is a classic Little Falls route where many trad climbers do their first leads. The island has had several famous climbers climb here, including Lynn Hill. Across from the island is an unmaintained cliff with a visible crossing crack Crucifix (5.8). Further downstream, a former cement factory has the dihedrals, a 0.25-mile (0.40 km) 100-foot (30 m) face. This cliff is privately owned and not open to the public.

== See also ==
- List of National Natural Landmarks in New York
