= Dexter Marsh =

American Natural Landmark

- Location within New York
- Location: Dexter, New York
- Coordinates: 43.98454°N 76.068478°W
- Area: 1,350 acres (5.5 km^{2})

U.S. National Natural Landmark
- Designated: 1973

Dexter Marsh is a 1,350-acre (5.5 km^{2}) marsh located at the eastern end of Lake Ontario in Dexter, New York. It was declared a National Natural Landmark in May 1973.

The marsh is managed by the New York State Department of Environmental Conservation as the Dexter Marsh Wildlife Management Area. The marsh is a popular fishing and trapping area as well as a migratory bird layover. Lacking barrier beaches, it is directly exposed to Lake Ontario's winds and waves. It is a relatively undeveloped bay-head area on the Great Lakes.

== See also ==
- List of National Natural Landmarks in New York
- List of New York state wildlife management areas
