= Rockland Lake State Park =

State park in New York, United States

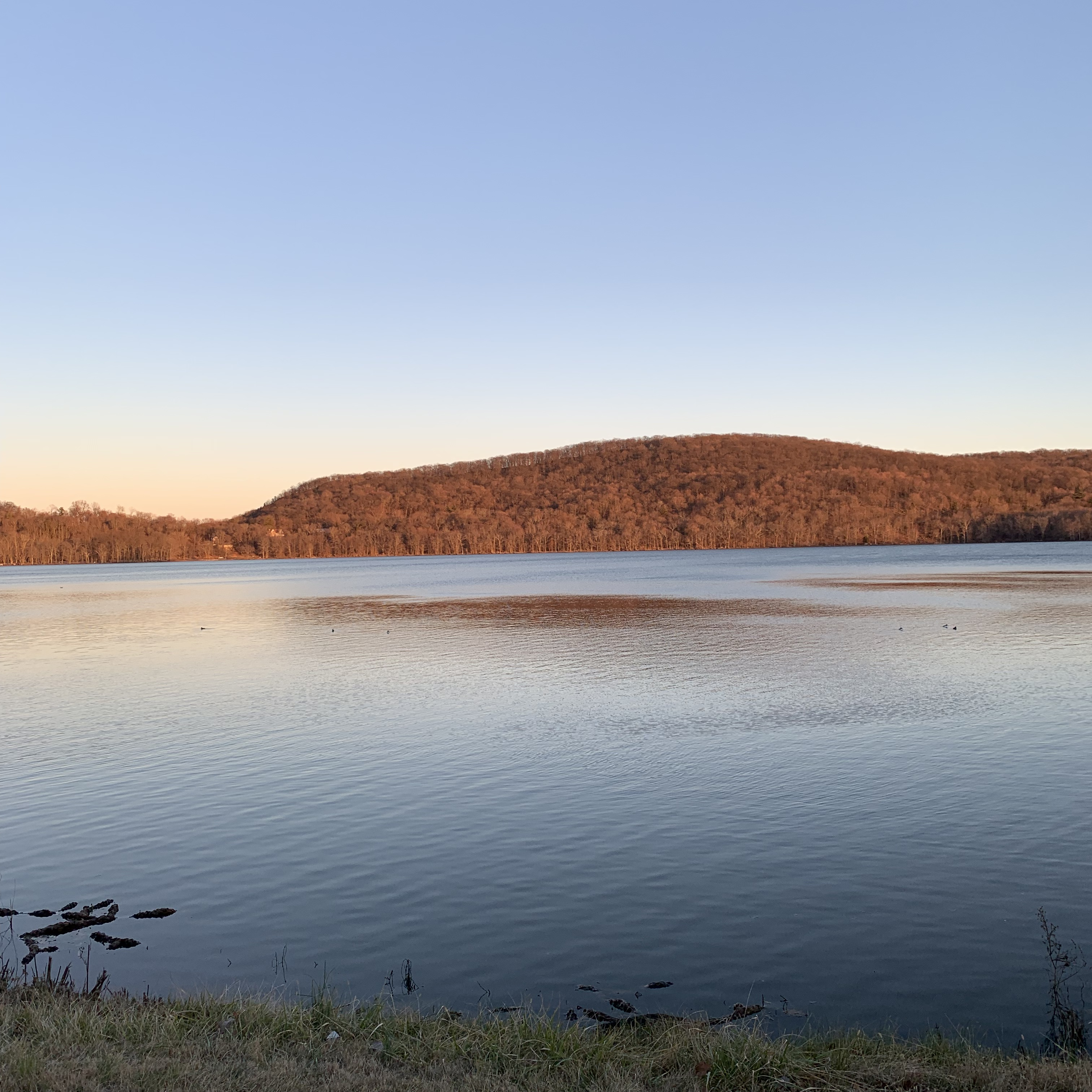

- Location within New York
- Type: State park
- Location: 299 Rockland Lake Road; Valley Cottage, New York
- Coordinates: 41°08′06″N 73°55′23″W
- Area: 1,133 acres (4.59 km^{2})
- Created: 1958
- Operator: Palisades Interstate Park Commission; New York State Office of Parks, Recreation and Historic Preservation
- Visitors: 629,173 (in 2014)
- Website: Rockland Lake State Park

Rockland Lake State Park is a 1,133-acre (4.59 km^{2}) state park located in the hamlets of Congers and Valley Cottage in the eastern part of the Town of Clarkstown in Rockland County, New York, United States. The park is located on a ridge of Hook Mountain above the west bank of the Hudson River. Included within the park is the 256-acre (1.04 km^{2}) Rockland Lake.

Development of the park as part of the Palisades Interstate Park system began in 1958. Rockland Lake State Park is functionally part of a continuous complex of parks that also includes Hook Mountain State Park, Nyack Beach State Park, and Haverstraw Beach State Park.

== History ==
Rockland Lake was known as "Quashpeake Pond" to the region's Native American population, prior to the lake being given its current name, which refers to the county in which it is situated. The adjacent hamlet of Rockland Lake was originally known as "Slaughter's Landing" before its name was changed to match the lake.

=== Ice production ===
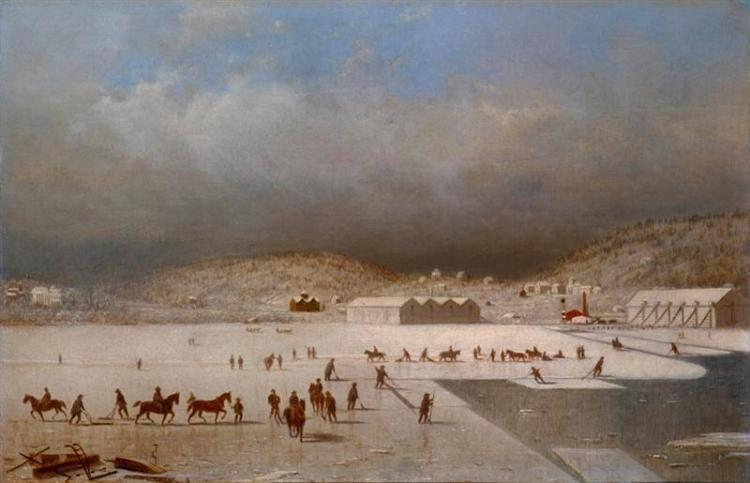
Cutting Ice, Rockland Lake, New York, Andrew F. Bunner, circa 1890

Prior to the establishment of the park, Rockland Lake served as an important supplier of ice to New York City after the Knickerbocker Ice Company was established on the lake's northeastern bank in 1831. Rockland Lake eventually became known as the "Icehouse of New York City", with a reputation for having the cleanest and purest ice in the area.

During the 1850s, the Knickerbocker Ice Company operated a dozen steamboats, 75 ice barges, and employed 3,000 people. Ice harvests typically began in January, and blocks of ice were stored in large icehouses before being shipped to customers during warmer weather. The icehouses, insulated with sawdust, could store up to 50,000 tons of ice.

The nearby Knickerbocker Fire House was established 1862.

The Knickerbocker Ice Company closed in 1924. In 1926, workers who were demolishing one of the ice houses accidentally set fire to the structure's sawdust insulation. The fire spread extremely quickly and destroyed much of the village of Rockland Lake. The fire did not burn the village down, read the newspaper stories of the day. The PIPC purchased much of the town and demolished it in the 1960's. The old foundation of the ice company remains today, marked by a historical plaque and bench.

=== The Church of the St. Michael the Archangel ===
The Church of the St. Michael the Archangel is a former Roman Catholic parish church under the authority of the Roman Catholic Archdiocese of New York, located in Rockland Lake, Rockland County, New York.

=== Recreational history ===
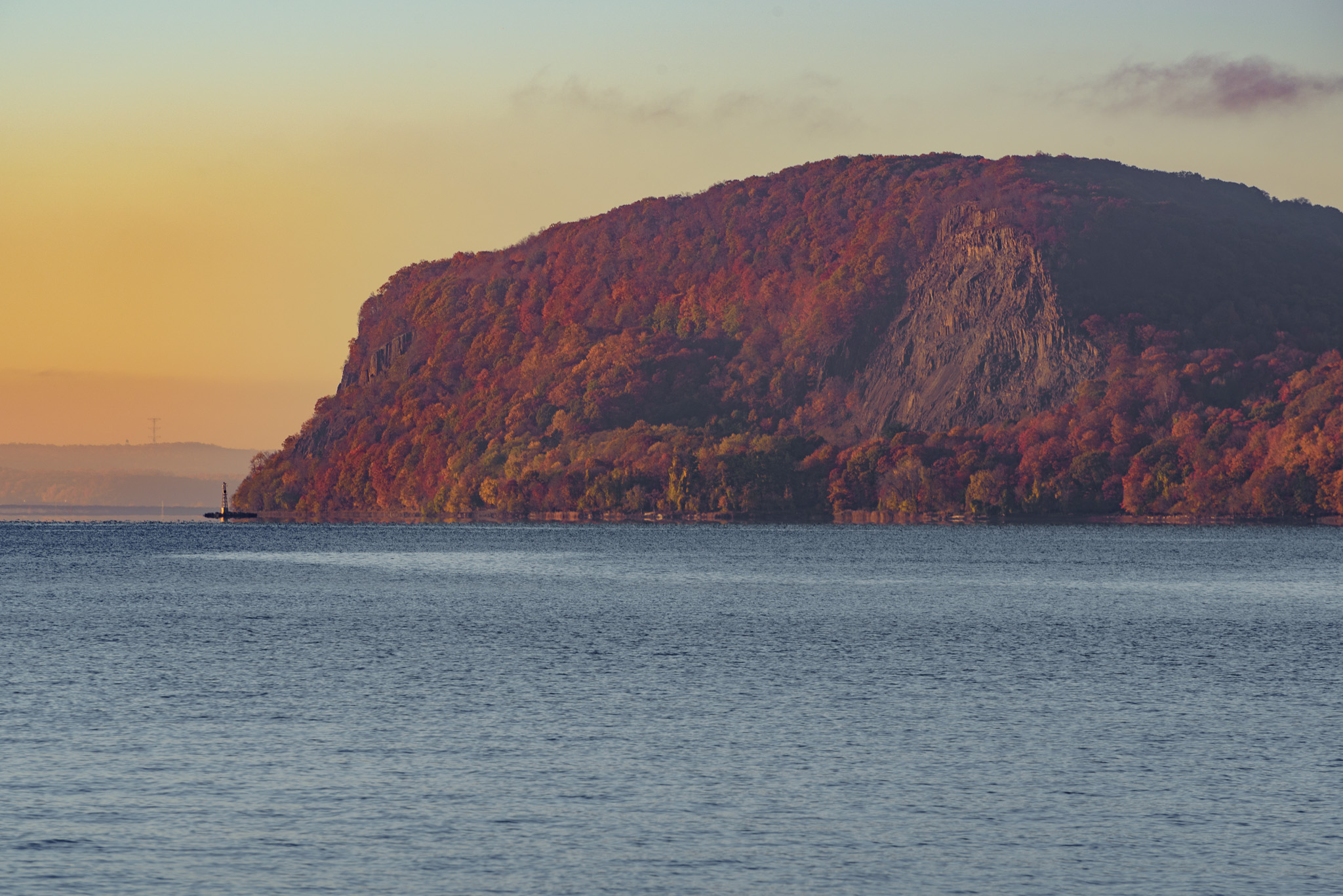
Hook Mountain, as viewed from the Hudson River

Rockland Lake has been formally used for recreation since 1873, when a picnic area known as "The Grove" was established near the north end of the lake. This was followed by the installation of a second recreation area near the south end of the lake known as the "Quaspeck Park Beach Club and Casino". At the turn of the 20th century, special trains delivered visitors to the lake's recreation areas.

The Palisades Interstate Park Commission purchased its first parcel of what was to become Rockland Lake State Park in 1958, which consisted of the lake and 225 acres (0.91 km^{2}) of land. By 1964, a total of 1,035 acres (4.19 km^{2}) had been purchased to form the park. During the intervening years, additional land acquisitions increased the park's size to its current total of 1,133 acres (4.59 km^{2}).

== Park description ==
Rockland Lake State Park features a 24,140-square-foot (2,243 m^{2}) swimming pool, in addition to a smaller pool for children. The park also has scattered picnic tables and grills, a car-top boat launch and boat rentals, hiking trails with views of the Hudson Valley, and six tennis courts. Anglers on Rockland Lake may catch bass, perch and panfish, while walkers, bikers and joggers may use the 3.2-mile (5.1 km) paved trail that circles the lake.

Rockland Lake also has its own fire department, Knickerbocker Engine Company 1, located at the rear of the park. It is the second-oldest fire department in Rockland County and is still in operation today.

=== Golf courses ===
Rockland Lake features two 18-hole golf courses, the Championship and Executive courses. The Championship course is a regulation golf course measuring 6,864 yards from the back tees, with a par of 72. It also features a driving range and clubhouse with snack bar. The Executive course is par 3 and measures 2,780 yards.

== See also ==
- List of New York state parks
