= Hook Mountain State Park =

State park in Rockland County, New York

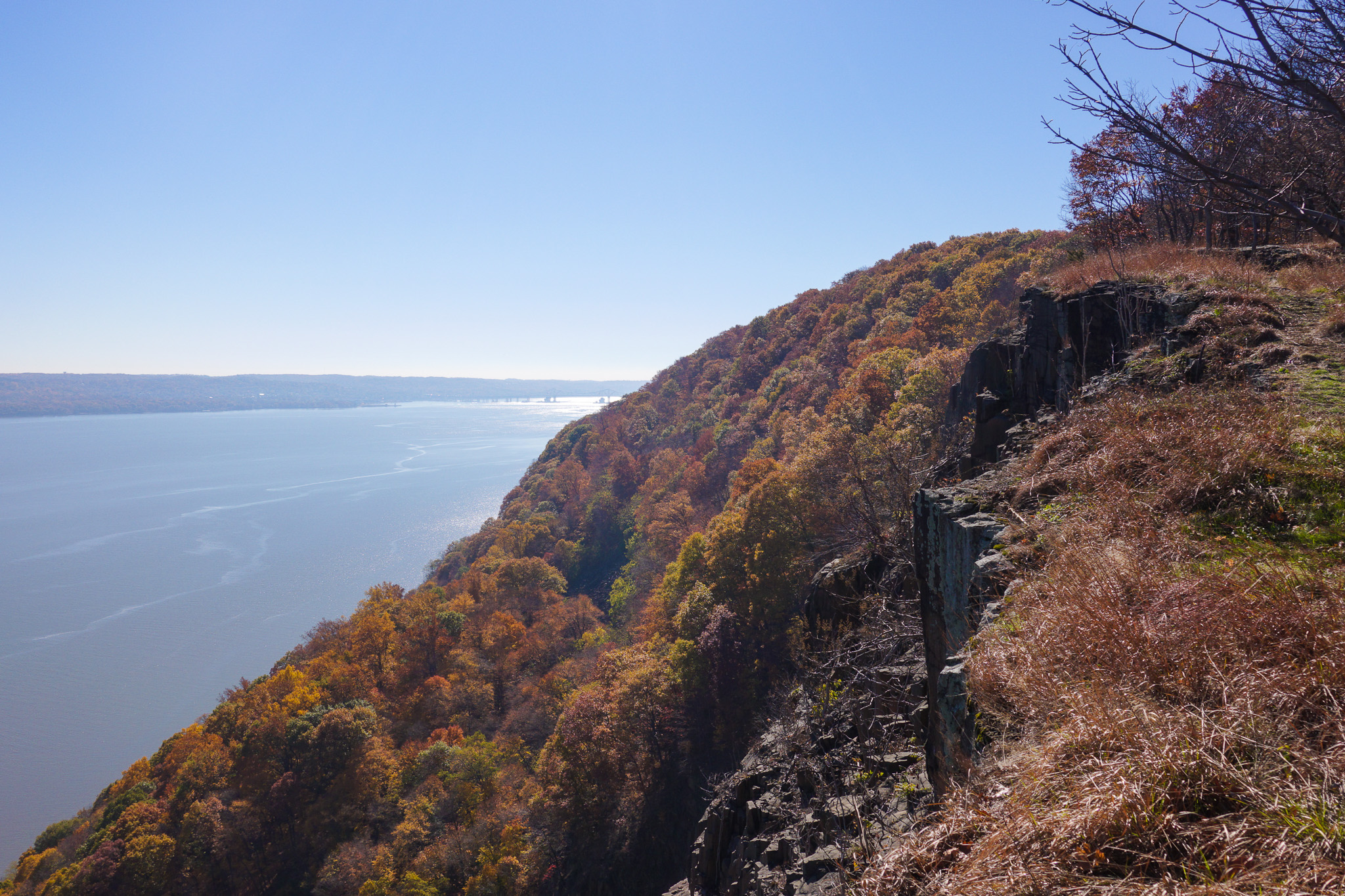
- View of the Hudson River from Hook Mountain State Park in November 2015.

- Location within New York
- Type: State park (undeveloped)
- Location: Rockland County, New York
- Nearest city: Upper Nyack, New York
- Coordinates: 41°07′22″N 73°55′09″W
- Area: 676 acres (2.74 km^{2})
- Created: 1911
- Operator: Palisades Interstate Park Commission; New York State Office of Parks, Recreation and Historic Preservation
- Visitors: 36,806 (in 2014)
- Open: All year

U.S. National Natural Landmark
- Designated: 1980

Hook Mountain State Park is a 676-acre (2.74 km^{2}) undeveloped state park located in Rockland County, New York. The park includes a portion of the Hudson River Palisades on the western shore of the Hudson River, and is part of the Palisades Interstate Park system. Hook Mountain State Park is functionally part of a continuous complex of parks that also includes Rockland Lake State Park, Nyack Beach State Park, and Haverstraw Beach State Park. The golf course, the summit and the entirety of trail system leading to the summit are completely inside Rockland Lake State Park. Hook Mountain State Park, despite its name, does not contain the summit of Hook Mountain.

== History ==
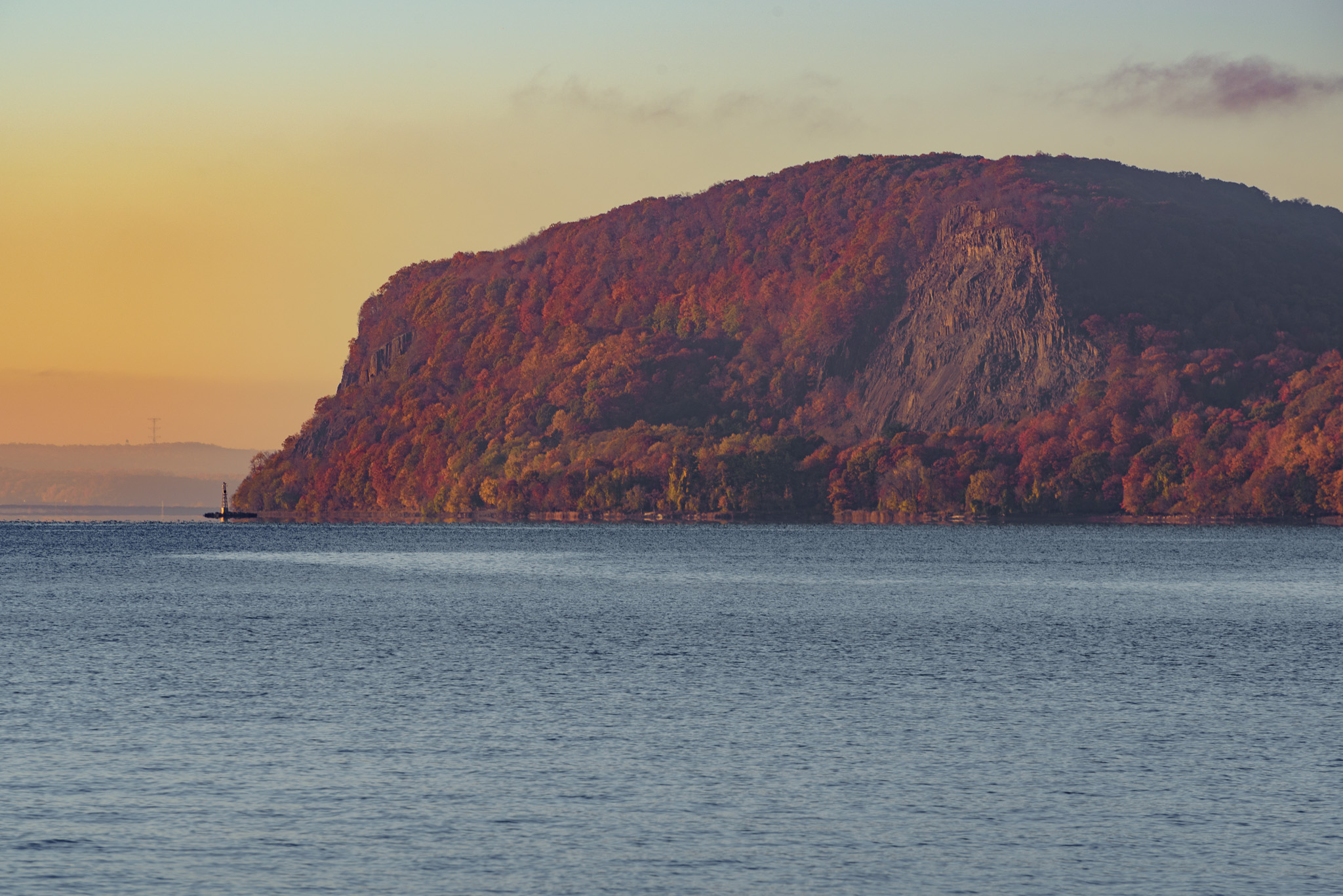
View of Hook Mountain from a northern point on the Hudson River in November 2015

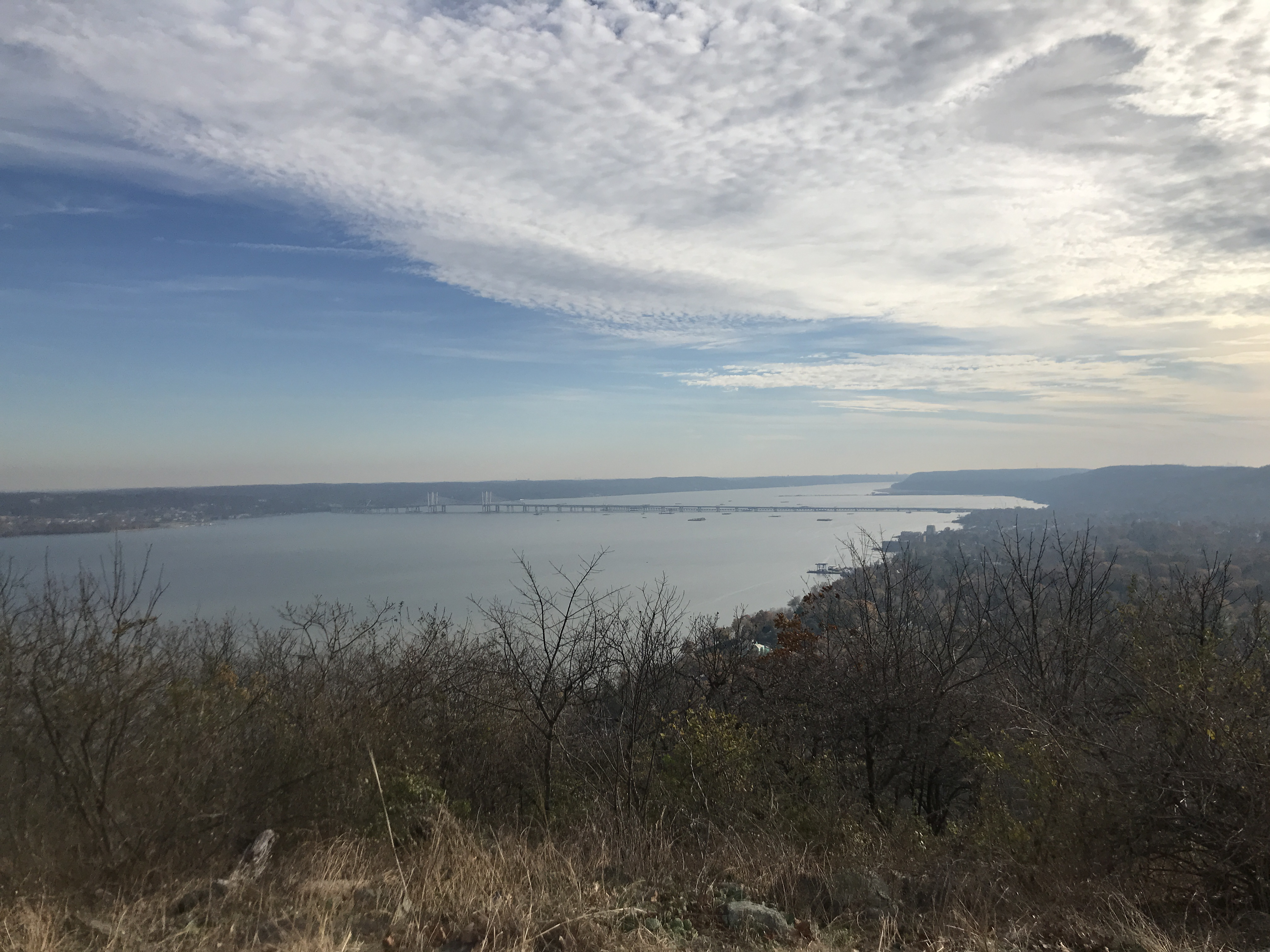
View from the summit of Hook Mountain in November 2017

Hook Mountain was known to Dutch settlers of the region as Verdrietige Hook, meaning "Tedious Point", which may have been a reference to how long the mountain remained in view while sailing past it along the Hudson River, or for the troublesome winds that sailors encountered near the point. Hook Mountain has also been known in the past as Diedrick Hook.

Like other areas of the Hudson River Palisades, the landscape now included in Hook Mountain State Park was threatened by quarrying in the late 19th and early 20th centuries. To ensure the land's protection, the property was acquired to be a part of the Palisades Interstate Park in 1911.

Portions of Hook Mountain State Park and nearby Nyack Beach State Park were designated as a National Natural Landmark in 1980 for their portion of the Palisades Sill.

Hook Mountain was designated by the New York Audubon Society as an Important Bird Area in 1997, due to its importance as a feeding area for migratory songbirds and hawks. It has been utilized annually as a hawk monitoring station since 1971. The park is currently designated as a "Bird Conservation Area" by the New York State Office of Parks, Recreation and Historic Preservation.

In May 2015, the Sisters of Our Lady of Christian Doctrine announced that they were considering allowing their 38-acre (0.15 km^{2}) property to become a part of Hook Mountain State Park. The order's property, which is adjacent to the southern portion of the park, could be sold to The Trust for Public Land, who would then transfer the property to New York State.

== Park description ==
Hook Mountain State Park is undeveloped, and primarily offers space for passive recreation such as hiking and bird-watching. The Long Path makes its way through the park and passes over Hook Mountain's summit.

Although the park is undeveloped, it is functionally part of a larger complex of parks that share continuous borders, including Rockland Lake State Park, Nyack Beach State Park, and Haverstraw Beach State Park, which contain dedicated recreational facilities.

== See also ==
- List of New York state parks
- List of National Natural Landmarks in New York
