= St. Michael's Church (Rockland Lake, New York) =

Church in Rockland County, NY

The Church of the St. Michael
- Interactive map of the The Church of the St. Michael area

General information
- Location: Rockland Lake, Rockland County, New York, United States of America
- Coordinates: 41°8′36″N 73°54′46″W
- Client: Roman Catholic Archdiocese of New York

The Church of the St. Michael the Archangel was a Roman Catholic parish church under the authority of the Roman Catholic Archdiocese of New York, located in Rockland Lake, Rockland County, New York.

== History ==
St. Michael's was originally established as an out-mission of Spring Valley, later becoming an annex of St. Peter's, Haverstraw. With the establishment of St. Paul's, Fr. John Nageleisen was instructed by Archbishop Michael A. Corrigan to oversee the building of the first church and school of St. Michael in Rockland Lake in 1901.

In 1901, an empty church in Nyack was donated, dismantled, and re-assembled in Rockland Lake as a mission station of Congers. The parish was established in 1909 with Father Kozimir Zakrasser (Zakrajsek) O.F.M. as pastor. The church burned down in 1914, but was rebuilt in brick. The new church was completed in 1917.

Following the decline of the quarry and ice industries in the 1920s, the parish was suppressed in 1927 and reverted to a mission of St. Paul's Church in Congers from 1927 to 1963.

Development of Rockland Lake State Park as part of the Palisades Interstate Park system began in 1958. As residents sold their homes and moved away the congregation dwindled. The mission was closed in 1963. The building was sold to the Palisades Interstate Commission which later demolished it in the course of establishing the state park.
