= List of National Natural Landmarks in New York =

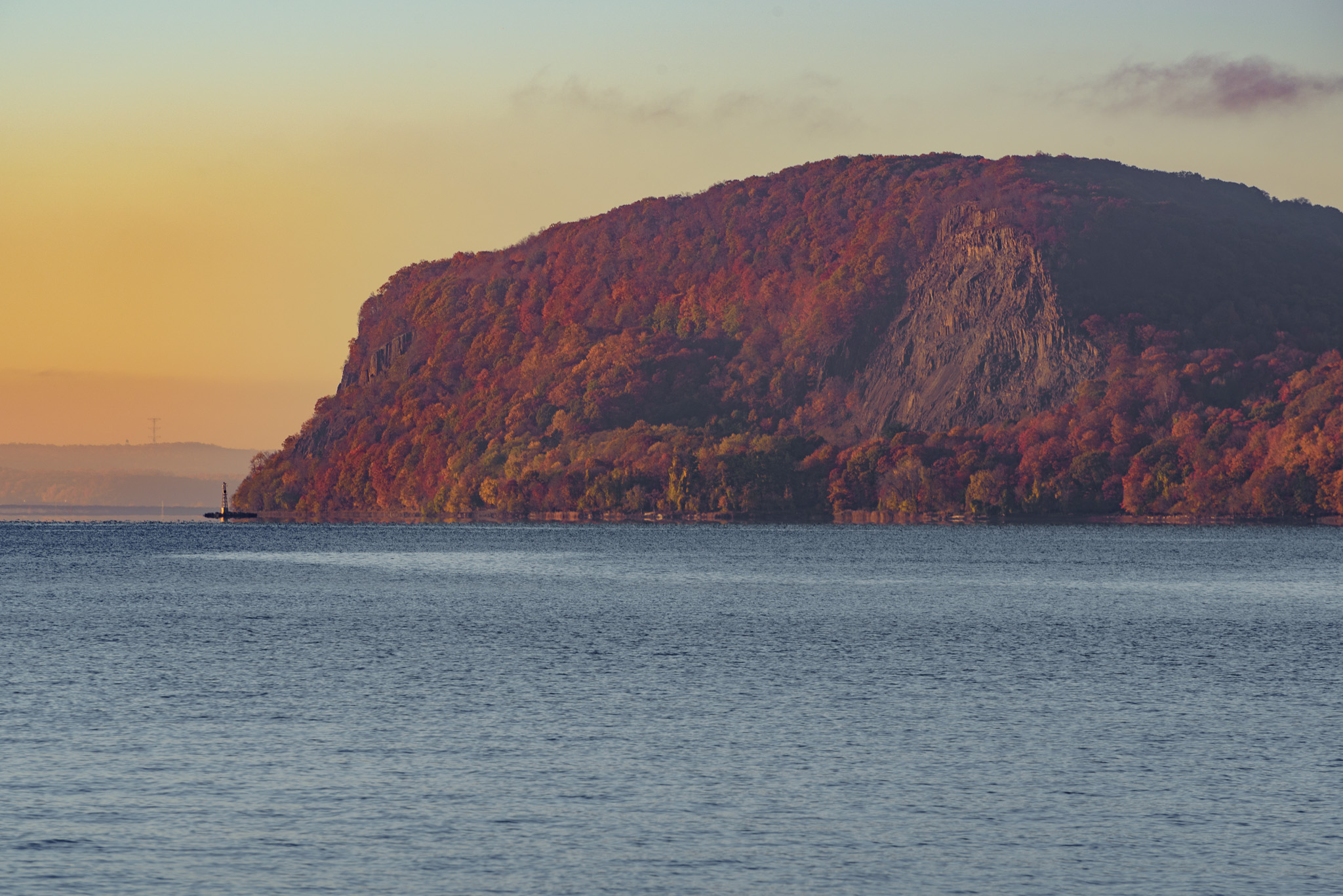
Hook Mountain, part of the "Hook Mountain and Nyack Beach State Park National Natural Landmark", designated in 1980 for its portion of the Palisades Sill.

The National Natural Landmarks in New York include 29 of the more than 600 National Natural Landmarks (NNLs) in the United States. Twenty-seven landmarks are contained entirely within New York; the two exceptions are the Palisades of the Hudson which extends along the Hudson River into New Jersey, and the Chazy Fossil Reef which spans several Lake Champlain islands belonging to both New York and Vermont.

New York's NNLs cover unique landforms carved by glacial meltwater, a rare meromictic lake, several exposed fossil sites, and the largest open fault system in the United States. The state's first NNLs, Bergen-Byron Swamp and Mianus River Gorge, were designated in 1964 and are the oldest NNLs in the nation; New York's newest NNL is the Albany Pine Bush, designated in 2014. Owners include private individuals, non-governmental conservation organizations, and several municipal, state and federal agencies. Designation as a NNL does not guarantee that a property is open to the public, and some are located on private property with restricted access.

The National Natural Landmarks Program is administered by the National Park Service, a branch of the Department of the Interior. NNLs are intended to showcase important biological and/or geological features, and represent illustrative or well-preserved examples of such sites within a given biological or physiographic province. Properties considered for NNL status are nominated by the National Park Service, and are accepted or rejected by the Secretary of the Interior after a review process.

The designation provides indirect, partial protection of the historic and biological integrity of the properties via tax incentives, grants, monitoring of threats, and other means. However, designation do never directly prohibit destruction or alteration of the property, and the designation may be revoked at any time by the National Park Service if the NNL is considered to have been significantly altered or damaged. Properties may also be de-designated by request of the property owner.

== National Natural Landmarks ==
New York National Natural Landmarks (clickable map)

Name	Image	Date	Location	County	Ownership	Description
Albany Pine Bush		July 2014		Albany	Mixed – state, county, municipal	Protects a pine scrub forest that occupies an area of periglacial dunes.
Bear Swamp Preserve		May 1973	Westerlo 42°28′27″N 74°03′34″W	Albany	Private	A 310-acre (1.3 km^{2}) Nature Conservancy preserve including a pond and surrounding swamp and woodland. It is recognized for its great laurel tree population.
Bergen-Byron Swamp		March 1964	Bergen 43°05′29″N 78°01′36″W	Genesee	Private	A 2,000-acre (8.1 km^{2}) swamp that was the first National Natural Landmark to be designated. It is managed by the Bergen Swamp Preservation Society.
Big Reed Pond		May 1973	Montauk 41°04′40″N 71°54′38″W	Suffolk	County	An undeveloped fresh water lake where the Montaukett tribe lived until the mid-19th century. It is connected to Montauk County Park.
Chazy Fossil Reef		May 2009		Clinton (New York), Grand Isle (Vermont)	Mixed – Federal, state, private	The oldest known fossil reef on earth, with numerous Ordovician fossils demonstrating faunal succession.
Deer Lick Nature Sanctuary		November 1967	Gowanda 42°25′16″N 78°54′20″W	Cattaraugus	Private	A 398-acre (1.61 km^{2}) Nature Conservancy preserve, containing 80 acres (0.32 km^{2}) of old growth forest. It is known for its wildlife and its gorges which highlight the Onondaga Escarpment.
Dexter Marsh		May 1973	Dexter 43°59′04″N 76°04′07″W	Jefferson	State	A 1,350-acre (5.5 km^{2}) wetland marsh located at the Eastern end of Lake Ontario. It is a popular fishing and trapping area as well as a migratory bird layover.
Ellenville Fault-Ice Caves		November 1967	Ellenville 41°40′19″N 74°20′51″W	Ulster	State	The largest open fault system in the United States results in ice caves which keeps ice year round and creates a cooler microclimate for more northern plants. Now part of Sam's Point Preserve.
Fall Brook Gorge		January 1970	Geneseo 42°46′32″N 77°49′43″W	Livingston	Private	An excellent example of Upper and Middle Devonian rock formations.
Fossil Coral Reef		November 1967	Le Roy	Genesee	Private	An abandoned limestone quarry, it contains a well preserved Middle Devonian coral reef along with rare tabulate and rugose corals, crinoids, gastropods, and trilobites.
Hart's Woods		June 1972	Perinton 43°05′52″N 77°24′43″W	Monroe	Municipal	Contains a pristine stand of beech-maple forest, a climax forest dominated by the American beech and sugar maple which covered most of the Northeastern United States when it was settled.
Hook Mountain and Nyack Beach State Park		April 1980	Upper Nyack 41°07′26″N 73°54′43″W	Rockland	State	A portion of the Palisades Sill in proximity to the Hudson River within two adjacent state parks.
Iona Island Marsh		May 1974	Stony Point 41°18′14″N 73°58′38″W	Rockland	State	An island and marsh in the Hudson River which is a bird sanctuary and part of Bear Mountain State Park.
Ironsides Island		April 1967	Alexandria Bay 44°23′46″N 75°51′02″W	Jefferson & St. Lawrence	Private	A rocky island in the Saint Lawrence River managed by The Nature Conservancy. Serves as a rookery for great blue herons.
John Boyd Thacher State Park		December 2023	42°39′21″N 74°01′09″W	Albany	State	
Lakeview Marsh and Barrier Beach		May 1973	Ellisburg 43°46′08″N 76°12′14″W	Jefferson	State	Adjacent to Southwick Beach State Park, this 3,461-acre (14.01 km^{2}) marsh is protected by a barrier beach from Lake Ontario, unlike nearby Dexter Marsh.
Long Beach, Orient State Park		April 1980	Southold 41°07′46″N 72°15′59″W	Suffolk	State	A 2.5-mile (4.0 km) sand spit beach within a state park at the end of Long Island, demonstrating plant succession from salt marsh to maritime red cedar forest.
McLean Bogs		May 1983	Dryden	Tompkins	Private	A small acidic kettle bog managed by Cornell Plantations which is part of Cornell University. It is used for scientific research on the lichens and their methane gas production.
Mendon Ponds Park		November 1967	Mendon 43°02′00″N 77°34′00″W	Monroe	County	A 2,500-acre (10 km^{2}) county park known for its birdwatching and its unusual glacial geology, including kettle holes, eskers, kames, and a floating sphagnum moss peat bog known as the Devils Bathtub.
Mianus River Gorge		March 1964	Bedford 41°11′09″N 73°37′17″W	Westchester	Private	A preserve known for its old growth climax hemlock forest and the Mianus River. The core area was the first land purchase deal by The Nature Conservancy.
Montezuma Marshes		May 1973	Seneca Falls 42°58′N 76°44′W	Seneca	Federal	A 7,000-acre (28 km^{2}) National Wildlife Refuge containing one of the best examples of undisturbed swamp woodlands in New York or New England. It is a major stop for migratory birds.
Moss Island		May 1976	Little Falls 43°02′23″N 74°50′54″W	Herkimer	State	An igneous intrusion in the Erie Canal with the Little Falls at one end. It became an island when locks were built so boats could avoid the 40 ft (12 m) falls. It is known for its extremely large 40–50 feet (12–15 m) glacial potholes created by retreating glaciers as well as being popular with local rock climbers.
Moss Lake Bogs		May 1973	Houghton 42°23′55″N 78°11′05″W	Allegany	Private	An 83-acre (340,000 m^{2}) glacial kettle lake which filled with melt water and rain. Over time, sphagnum moss has grown over the open water, turning it into an acidic bog. It is managed by The Nature Conservancy.
Oak Orchard Creek Marsh		May 1973	Medina 43°08′06″N 78°22′15″W	Genesee & Orleans	Mixed – Federal, state	The marsh contains a state reserve, Oak Orchard Wildlife Management Area, and a national reserve, the Iroquois National Wildlife Refuge, both of which are known as major stopover points for migratory birds. It was created by a partial blockage of the Oak Orchard River by glacial drift and an outcrop of limestone and dolomite known as the Lockport formation which forms the Niagara Escarpment.
Palisades of the Hudson		November 1984	Hudson River 40°57′52″N 73°54′31″W	Rockland	State	A line of dramatic 350-foot (110 m) cliffs of the Palisades Sill along the west side of the lower Hudson River.
Petrified Gardens		April 1967	Saratoga Springs 43°04′59″N 73°50′40″W	Saratoga	Private	This private park preserves an area of ancient stromatolites in a fossilized ancient Cambrian reef. Stromatolites "were first recognized, discovered, and interpreted in North America" here in 1922. The park, which is now closed, was a childhood inspiration for Stephen Jay Gould.
Round Lake		May 1973	Fayetteville 43°02′56″N 75°58′23″W	Onondaga	State	Part of Green Lakes State Park, this lake is a rare meromictic lake is surrounded by a well preserved mesophytic forest
Thompson Pond		May 1973	Pine Plains 41°57′40″N 73°40′43″W	Dutchess	Private	A 75-acre (300,000 m^{2}) glacial kettle pond and surrounding 507-acre (2.05 km^{2}) nature preserve managed by The Nature Conservancy. It is the source of Wappinger Creek, a tributary of the Hudson River that drains much of Dutchess County. It is known for its calcareous bogs, distinct from the acidic bogs found elsewhere in the Northeast.
Zurich Bog		May 1973	Arcadia 43°08′41″N 77°03′02″W	Wayne	Private	A sphagnum bog managed by the Bergen Swamp Preservation Society.

== Former National Natural Landmark ==
According to a notice in the Federal Register in July 2006, Gardiner's Island in Suffolk County was removed by the Department of the Interior from National Natural Landmark status in response to owner requests. It was originally designated in April 1967. Its description formerly read: "The island is a breeding ground for osprey and is an important habitat of other fauna, particularly waterfowl and shore birds."

== See also ==
- List of National Natural Landmarks
- List of National Historic Landmarks in New York
