= Fall Brook Gorge =

- Location within New York
- Location: Geneseo, Livingston County, New York
- Coordinates: 42°46′32″N 77°49′43″W
- Designated: 1970

Fall Brook Gorge is located in the Town of Geneseo in Livingston County, New York, outside the Village of Geneseo. It is an excellent example of Upper and Middle Devonian rock formations.

It was designated a National Natural Landmark in January 1970. It is on private land.

== See also ==
- List of National Natural Landmarks in New York
