= Haverstraw Beach State Park =

State park in Rockland County, New York

- Location within New York
- Type: State park
- Location: Rockland County, New York
- Nearest city: Haverstraw, New York
- Coordinates: 41°10′40″N 73°56′41″W
- Area: 73 acres (0.30 km^{2})
- Created: 1911
- Operator: Palisades Interstate Park Commission; New York State Office of Parks, Recreation and Historic Preservation
- Visitors: 30,152 (in 2014)
- Open: All year

Haverstraw Beach State Park is a 73-acre (0.30 km^{2}) state park located in the Haverstraw, New York. The park is included within the Palisades Interstate Park system and is functionally part of a continuous complex of parks that also includes Rockland Lake State Park, Hook Mountain State Park, and Nyack Beach State Park.

== History ==
The park's location was formerly known as Snedeker's Landing or Waldberg Landing, and was the place where British Major John André met with American General Benedict Arnold on September 21, 1780, to plot the surrender of West Point during the American Revolutionary War.

Snedeker's Landing was also the former home of Rockland County's first shipyard, established in 1845 to build and maintain barges used to haul bricks from Haverstraw's brickyards to New York City.

The Palisades Interstate Park Commission purchased what was to become the park in 1911 to protect the land from the effects of quarrying that were impacting the Hudson River Palisades during the late 19th and early 20th centuries.

== Park description ==
Haverstraw Beach State Park is minimally developed, and primarily offers trails for biking, hiking and dog-walking. Views of Haverstraw Bay, the widest point of the Hudson River, can be seen from within the park.

== See also ==
- List of New York state parks
