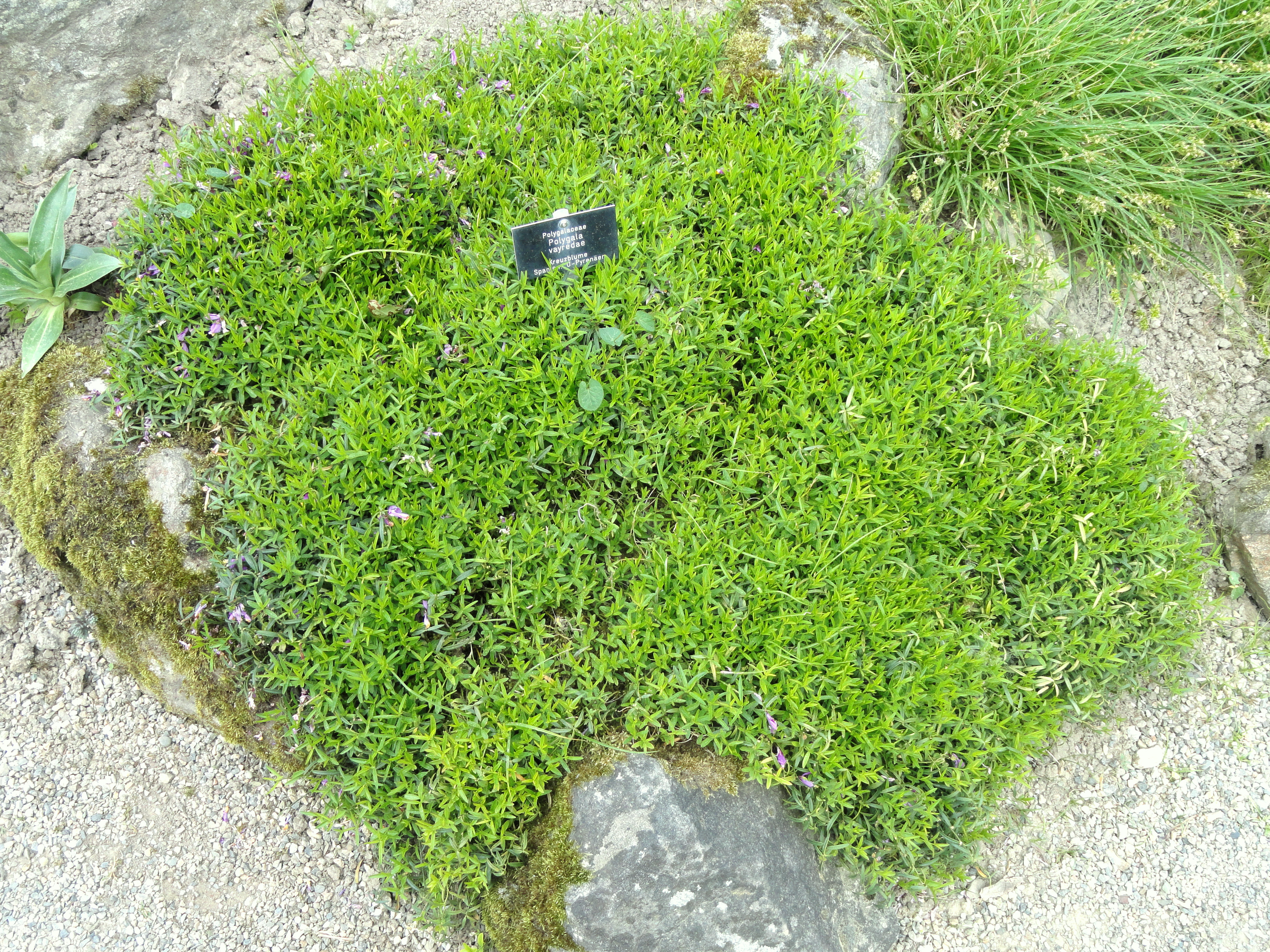

Scientific classification
- Kingdom: Plantae
- Clade: Embryophytes
- Clade: Tracheophytes
- Clade: Angiosperms
- Clade: Eudicots
- Clade: Rosids
- Order: Fabales
- Family: Polygalaceae
- Genus: Chamaebuxus
- Species: C. vayredae

Binomial name
- Chamaebuxus vayredae (Costa) Willk.

= Chamaebuxus vayredae =

Species of flowering plant

Chamaebuxus vayredae is a species of flowering plant in the milkwort family (Polygalaceae). It is endemic to the Pyrenees in Spain.
