= Fossil Coral Reef =

National Natural Landmark in Le Roy, New York

- Interactive map of Fossil Coral Reef
- Location: Le Roy, Genesee County, New York
- Coordinates: 42.997°N 77.930°W
- Area: 100 acres (0.40 km^{2})

U.S. National Natural Landmark
- Designated: 1967

Fossil Coral Reef, also known locally as Bradbury Quarry, is a 100-acre (0.40 km^{2}) abandoned limestone quarry in Le Roy, New York. It contains a well-preserved Middle Devonian coral reef along with rare tabulate and rugose corals, crinoids, gastropods, and trilobites.

The site was declared a National Natural Landmark in November 1967. It is often used by local paleontology classes.

== See also ==
- List of National Natural Landmarks in New York
