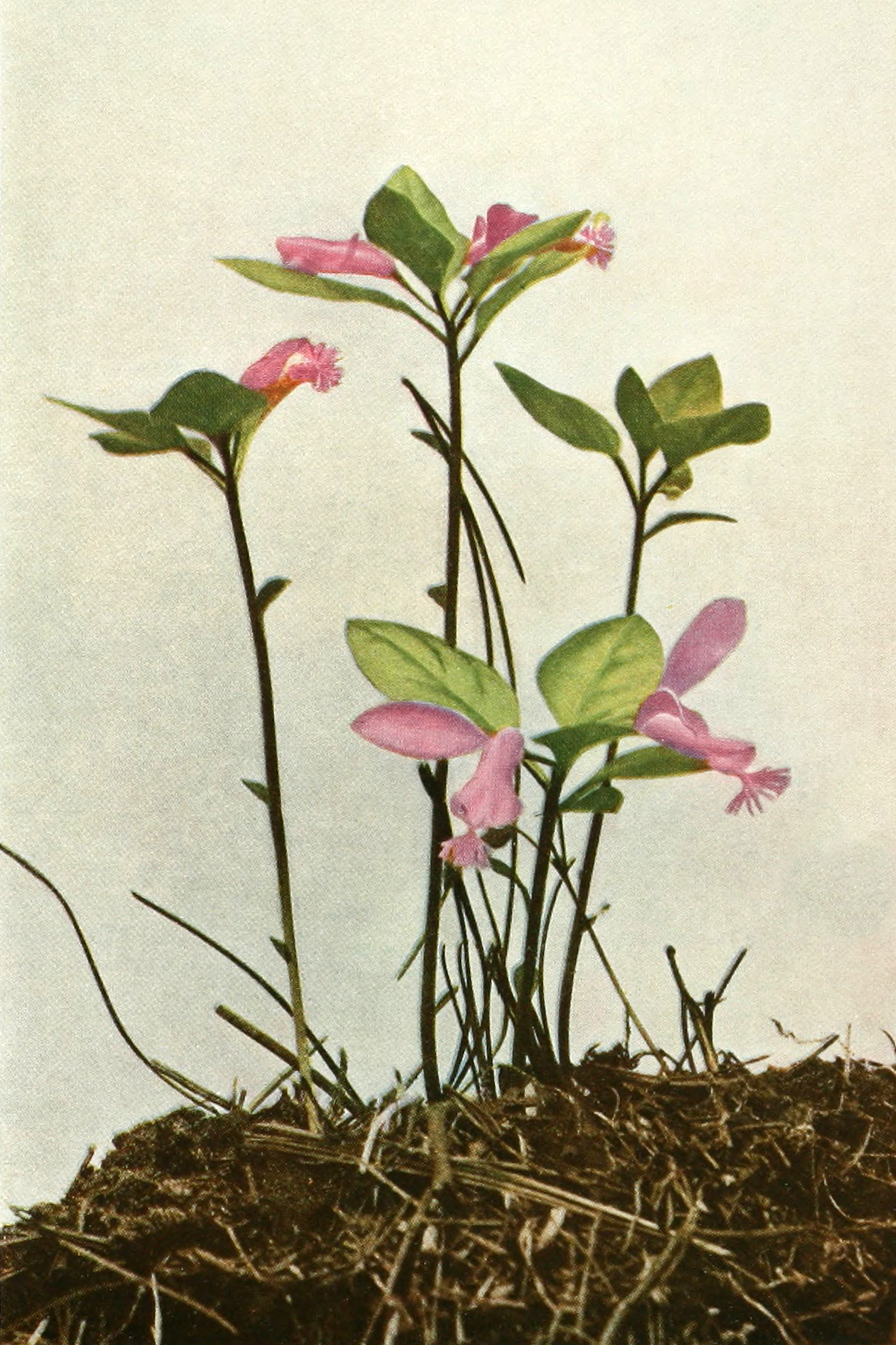
- Chamaebuxus paucifolia

Scientific classification
- Kingdom: Plantae
- Clade: Tracheophytes
- Clade: Angiosperms
- Clade: Eudicots
- Clade: Rosids
- Order: Fabales
- Family: Polygalaceae
- Genus: Chamaebuxus; Tourn.

Type species
- Chamaebuxus alpestris Spach

Species
- 6; see text

Synonyms
- Iridisperma Raf., nom. superfl.; Polygaloides Haller, nom. superfl.; Tertria Schrank, nom. superfl.; Triclisperma Raf.; Zoroxus Raf., nom. superfl.

= Chamaebuxus =

Genus of flowering plants

Chamaebuxus is a genus of flowering plants belonging to the family Polygalaceae. It includes six species, five from the Mediterranean region and central Europe and one from eastern North America.

== Taxonomy ==
The taxonomy of the genus has varied. When a broad circumscription of the genus Polygala is used, it includes Chamaebuxus. When a narrower circumscription is used, there has been uncertainty as to the name which has priority for this genus. Some sources used Polygaloides Haller, others, particularly early sources, Chamaebuxus Tourn. When Polygala was divided into multiple genera in 2011, the author considered Polygaloides to have priority, Tournefort's earlier Chamaebuxus being a pre-Linnaean name and therefore unacceptable. In 2024, Martinez and Pastore showed that Tournefort's name was validly published in 1753, so that Polygaloides was a superfluous name (nom. superfl.) and therefore illegitimate. This view was accepted by Plants of the World Online as of November 2025.

=== Species ===
As of November 2025, Plants of the World Online accepted the following species:

- Chamaebuxus alpestris Spach (synonym Polygaloides chamaebuxus (L.) O.Schwarz)
- Chamaebuxus balansae (Coss.) Stapf
- Chamaebuxus munbyana (Boiss. & Reut.) Stapf
- Chamaebuxus paucifolia (Willd.) J.F.B.Pastore & Agust.Martinez (synonym Polygaloides paucifolia (Willd.) J.R.Abbott)
- Chamaebuxus vayredae (Costa) Willk.
- Chamaebuxus webbiana (Coss.) Stapf
