= Ironsides Island =

Island in New York, United States

- Location within New York

Geography
- Location: St. Lawrence River
- Coordinates: 44°23′46″N 75°51′2″W
- Area: 30 acres (12 ha)
- Highest elevation: 272 ft (82.9 m)

Administration
- United States
- State: New York
- Counties: Jefferson; St. Lawrence
- Towns: Alexandria; Hammond
- Owner: The Nature Conservancy

U.S. National Natural Landmark
- Designated: 1967

Ironsides Island is an uninhabited rocky island in the Saint Lawrence River, and part of the Thousand Islands region near Alexandria Bay, New York. It is in both Jefferson and St. Lawrence counties. Most of the island lies in the town of Alexandria, in Jefferson County, while its northeasternmost corner lies in the town of Hammond, in St. Lawrence County. The island is located near Kring Point State Park.

The 30-acre (12 ha) island has 30-to-40-foot (9 to 12 m) cliffs along its waterfront, and its vegetation is dominated by white pine trees. It was donated by former Reader's Digest ad executive William Browning to The Nature Conservancy in the late 1960s to ensure protection of the island's great blue heron rookery. Over a thousand herons return to breed every April. It was declared a National Natural Landmark in 1967.

Prior permission from The Nature Conservancy is required to land on the island, but it can easily be viewed from the water.

== See also ==
- List of National Natural Landmarks in New York
