= Nyack Beach State Park =

State park in Rockland County, New York

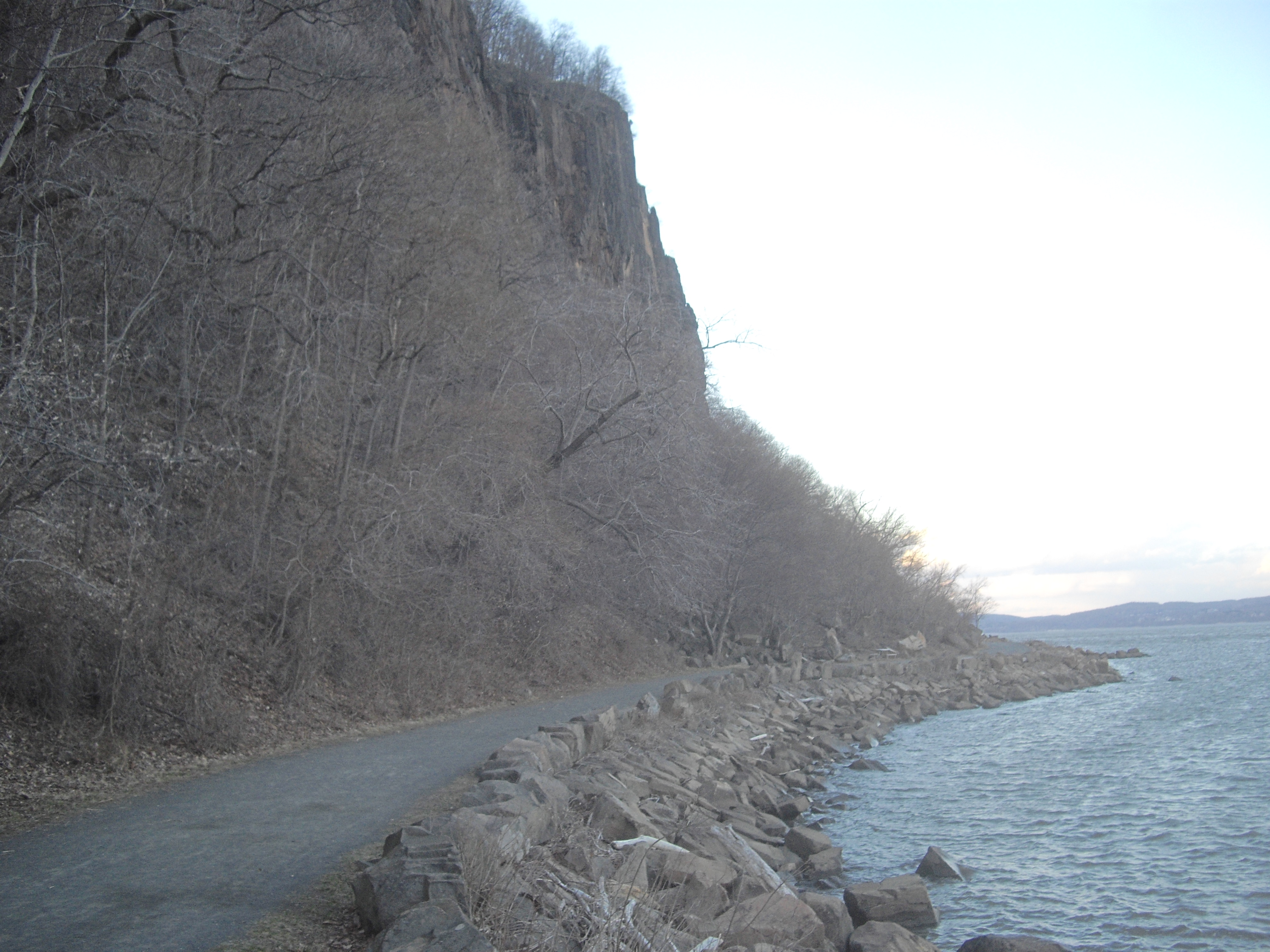
- A path between the Palisades Sill and the Hudson River at Nyack Beach State Park

- Location within New York
- Type: State park
- Location: Upper Nyack; Rockland County, New York
- Coordinates: 41°07′15″N 73°54′40″W
- Area: 61 acres (0.25 km^{2})
- Created: 1911
- Operator: Palisades Interstate Park Commission; New York State Office of Parks, Recreation and Historic Preservation
- Visitors: 169,661 (in 2014)
- Website: Nyack Beach State Park

U.S. National Natural Landmark
- Designated: 1980

Nyack Beach State Park is a 61-acre (0.25 km^{2}) state park in Upper Nyack, Rockland County, New York. It consists of a small parking lot and a riverfront pathway, the southernmost section of the Hudson River Valley Greenway. It is known for its physical proximity to the Hudson River on one side of the pathway and the looming cliffs of the Palisades rising 700 feet (210 m) above on the other side.

The park is included within the Palisades Interstate Park system and is functionally part of a continuous complex of parks that also includes Rockland Lake State Park, Hook Mountain State Park, and Haverstraw Beach State Park.

== History ==
The Palisades Interstate Park Commission purchased what was to become Nyack Beach State Park in 1911 to provide space for recreation, and to protect the land from the effects of quarrying that were impacting the Hudson River Palisades during the late 19th and early 20th centuries.

Along with a portion of adjacent Hook Mountain State Park, Nyack Beach was declared a National Natural Landmark in April 1980 for its portion of the Palisades Sill.

== Park description ==
The park offers picnicking, hiking, bicycling, fishing, and cross-country skiing along the pathway.. The path is flat and handicapped accessible. The pathway runs for two miles (3.2 km) along the river towards Rockland Lake State Park.

As the name implies, the park originally included a swimming beach which has been closed for many years due to pollution in the Hudson River. In 2005, it was suggested that the beach could be reopened for swimming due to the improved condition of the river.

=== Wildlife ===
Hawks and raptors nest in the cliff and are easily viewed from the pathway. In 1994 there was a harbor seal at the park, and in 1995 a harbor seal spent much of August in the vicinity of the park. Whitetail deer are spotted often, and on rarer occasions, predators such as eastern coyotes, American black bears, and red foxes are spotted. Fossils and dinosaur footprints have been found in the rocks along the pathway.

== See also ==
- List of New York state parks
- List of National Natural Landmarks in New York
