= Hart's Woods =

Forest in New York, United States

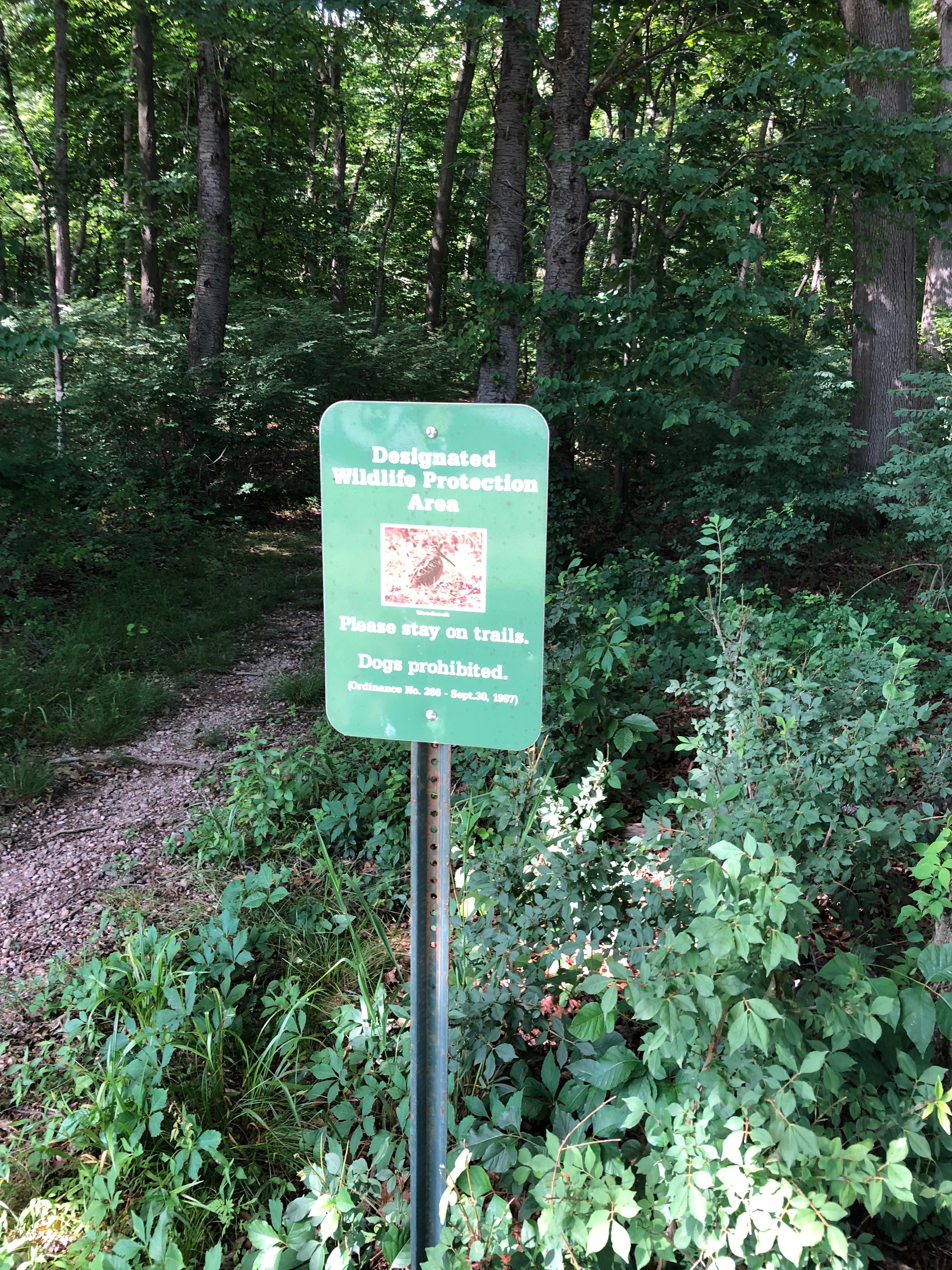
- trail entrance signage

- Location within New York
- Location: Perinton, New York
- Coordinates: 43°05′52″N 77°24′43″W
- Area: 14 acres (5.7 ha)
- Governing body: Town of Perinton

U.S. National Natural Landmark
- Designated: 1972

Hart's Woods is a small forest located in Perinton, New York. It contains a pristine stand of beech-maple forest, which covered 47% of Perinton prior to settlement. This type of forest with two dominant tree species thrives in areas of glacial till. The 14-acre (5.7 ha) site was declared a National Natural Landmark in June 1972.

Hart's Woods is open to the public for hiking on its trail system. It is operated by the Town of Perinton Recreation and Parks Department.

== See also ==
- List of National Natural Landmarks in New York
