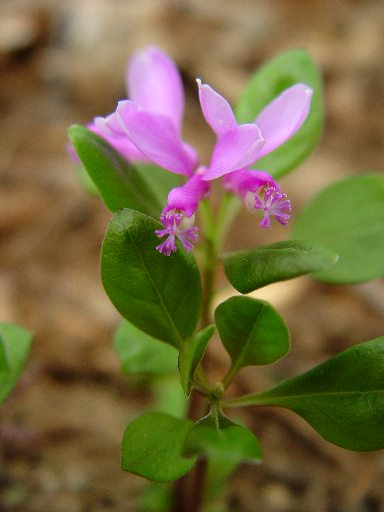
- At the Botanical Gardens at Asheville

Scientific classification
- Kingdom: Plantae
- Clade: Embryophytes
- Clade: Tracheophytes
- Clade: Spermatophytes
- Clade: Angiosperms
- Clade: Eudicots
- Clade: Rosids
- Order: Fabales
- Family: Polygalaceae
- Genus: Chamaebuxus
- Species: C. paucifolia

Binomial name
- Chamaebuxus paucifolia (Willd.) J.F.B.Pastore & Agust.Martinez

Synonyms
- Polygala commutata Sweet; Polygala paucifolia Willd.; Polygala purpurea W.T.Aiton; Polygala uniflora Michx.; Polygaloides paucifolia (Willd.) J.R.Abbott; Trichlisperma grandiflorum Raf.; Trichlisperma paucifolium (Willd.) Nieuwl.; Triclisperma grandiflora Raf.; Triclisperma paucifolia (Willd.) Nieuwl.

= Chamaebuxus paucifolia =

Gaywings

Species of flowering plant

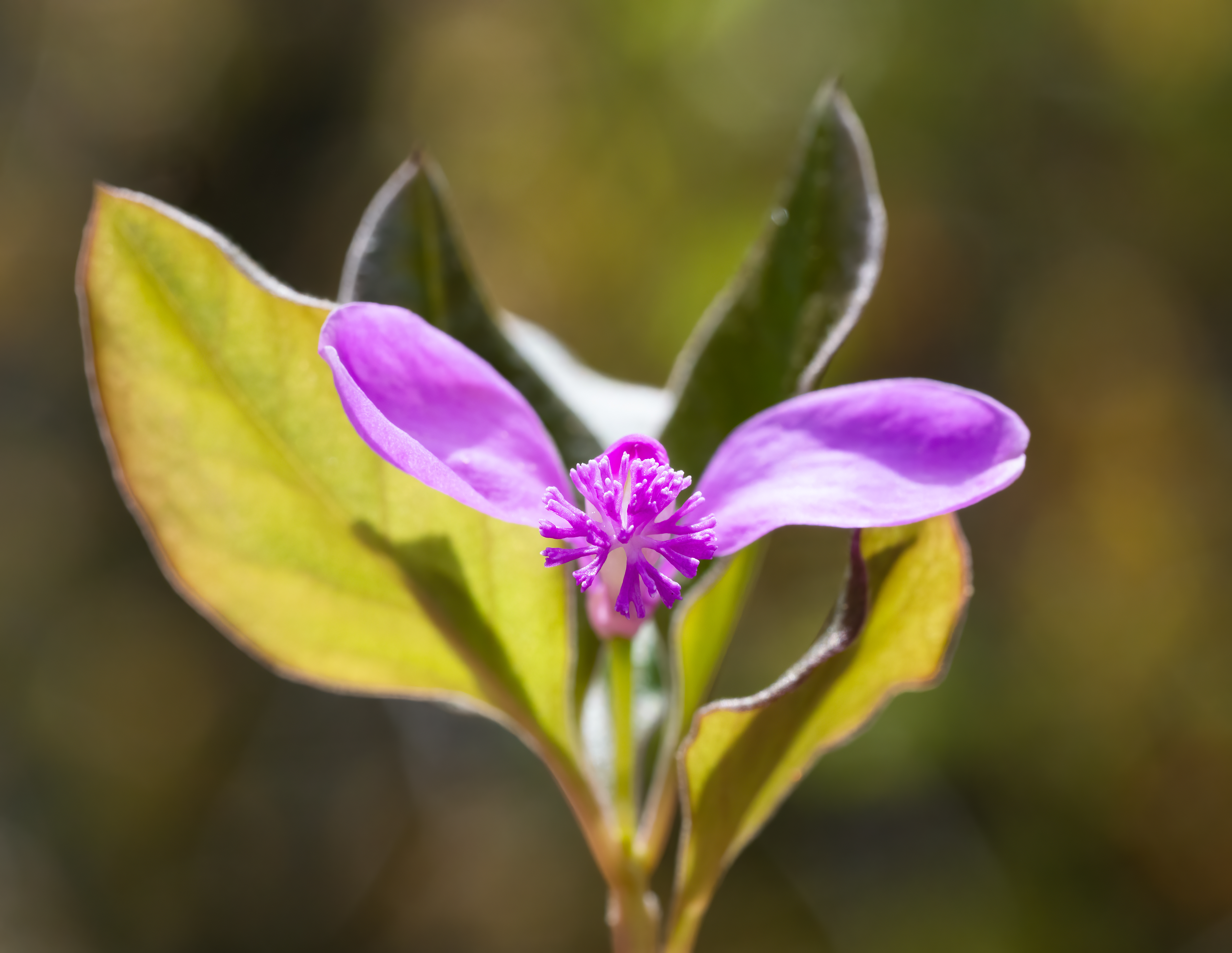
Fringed milkwort flower in New York

Chamaebuxus paucifolia, synonyms including Polygaloides paucifolia and Polygala paucifolia, known as gaywings or fringed polygala, is a perennial plant of the family Polygalaceae.

== Description ==
Often mistaken for an orchid, mature plants are perennials that are 3 to 6 inches tall. Stems are smooth, slender and green. Leaves are clustered at the top, appearing to be whorled, but they are not. Leaflets are oblong to lanceolate—narrow at the base with a pointed tip. Leaves have an entire margin and are thin.

Flowers are pink and white, blooming in April and May. It grows in rich, moist woods, and field edges. Chamaebuxus paucifolia is native to more temperate regions of North America. It is famed for its fringed, small flowers that are said to look like "birds in flight".

The plant has underground stems that it emerges from.

The species has 1-4 deeply pink and some parts white chasmogous flowers, as seen in the images from Michigan and New York on the side. The plant normally has two sepals emerging from both sides, that appear in the shape and characteristics of petals, that flare out like wings, hence the nickname mentioned previously. These sepals create tube-like structures that conceal the reproductive structures for the plant. The tube structure is created through the fusing of two of the sepals. The plant also has three smaller sepals, that are less large in their appearance in comparison to the previous.

Leaves are whorled nearing the tip of the stem of the plant and they are alternate in arrangement. The edges are without hair, but with small "teeth" on the surface.

The fruits of this plant are ¼ to 1/3 inch capsule-like structures that are obovoid.

The plant has six stamens.

== Taxonomy ==
The species was first described, as Polygala paucifolia, by Carl Ludwig Willdenow in 1802. In 2011, John Richard Abbott divided up part of the genus Polygala into more sharply defined genera. He placed P. paucifolia in Polygaloides as Polygaloides paucifolia. As of May 2026, Plants of the World Online regarded Polygaloides as a synonym of Chamaebuxus, so treated the species as Chamaebuxus paucifolia.

Chamaebuxus paucifolia is known most commonly as the "gaywings" or "fringed polygala". More names include the fringed milkwort, Trichlisperma grandiflorum, Trichlisperma paucifolium, Polygala purpurea, and Polygala uniflora, all of which are used to describe differing varieties in color, flower amount, and other factors.

== Habitat and ecology ==
This plant is native to North America and grows in fields, meadows, forests, woodlands, and field edges.

In terms of the plants ecological interactions, eating this plant is said to increase lactation in most mammals and potentially humans. They rely on ants to move their seeds for the most part and the ants gain a nutrient rich attachment to the seed that causes them to pull it into their nests, moving the seed around and underground. This strategy is referred to as myrmecochory, a method of seed disperal in which ants are the primary seed carrier for an organism. Therefore, it is advantageous for the ants to move the seeds as they gain the nutrient rich attachment, which works well for seed dispersal for this plant. However, if the seed is left for too long, the plant itself is heavily concentrated in lipids, proteins, and starches, but their seeds are especially so, and are often victim of ants if left for too long before germinating.

== Cultivation and propagation ==
This plant grows in 60 percent humidity, indirect bright sunlight (about six hours a day), with loamy and wet soil. For agricultural uses, soil content is significant, and a nutrient composition of 5:10:5 is favored for the plants optimum success. The temperature should be at an average of 18 degrees Celsius.

Propagation in the spring is ideal, although the flowers are potentially toxic if consumed by most animals, including dogs. It is recommended for this plant, as well as the broader milkwort family, to plant from seed in the ground, opposed to transplanting the seedlings early on. The plant grows laterally through very thin rhibozomes, best propagated in wet, and organic farming practices, and it does not respond well to commercial farming practices like the uses of pesticides and other chemicals.

In terms of seed storage, some say that they can be stored up to four months in dry and cold conditions, but more precautionary efforts state a maximum viability of three months when properly stored.

== Traditional medical uses ==
Historically, the plant was used in medicinal practices for skin irritation and respiratory illnesses like coughing and phlegm. In terms of respiratory illness, it is specifically recommended for use with asthma patients, as well as proving to be helpful with patients with cases of pneumonia. Native Americans used the plant for both respiratory illnesses as well as linking the medicinal use of the plant to cardiovascular health. The Native American Ethnobotany database cites the following uses for the plant as published by the Iroquois by James William Herrick in a medical ethnobotany book in 1977.

- Dermatological Aid: "Decoction of plant used as a wash for boils and syphilitic sores."
- Dermatological Aid: "Infusion of plant taken and poultice of leaves applied to abscesses on limbs."
- Orthopedic Aid: "Compound poultice of plants applied to sore legs."
- Pediatric Aid: "Decoction of plant used as a wash for babies with syphilitic sores."
- Venereal Aid: "Decoction of plant used as a wash for babies with syphilitic sores."

While used for traditional medicinal practices, this plant, when consumed or used in high dosages can lead to excessive diarrhea and vomiting. With this in mind, this plant should not be used as a terminal solution due to its affects when used in high dosages. Due to the excessive affects on the stomach, this plant historically was viewed as an abortion remedy, back when birth control and abortion medicine were not legal or modernized. This plant was seen as a "home remedy" to prevent conception, however, since this point there have been no scientific studies or support for this theory. Despite this never being proved, the plant is just recommended to avoid being in contact with while pregnant.

== Historical and cultural implications ==
This plant is known by some Native American tribes as "tcika-tape", meaning "bad sick", in reference to its historical medicinal uses.

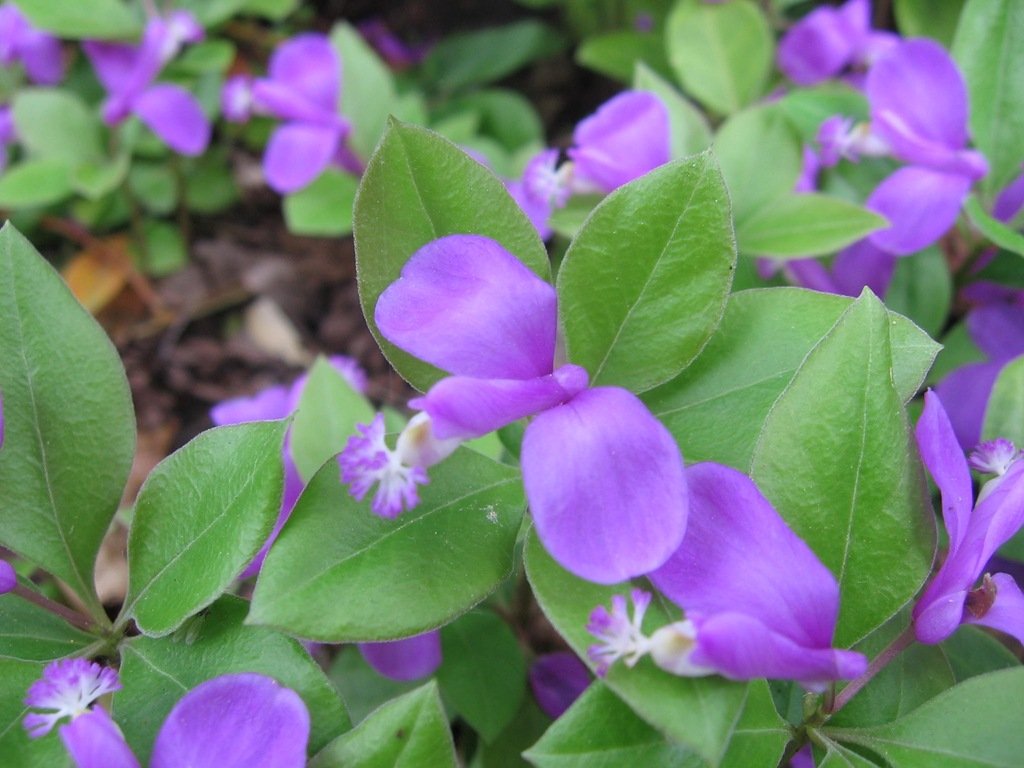
On Mackinac Island, Michigan
