= Harlem Blues (Satan and Adam album) =

Studio album by Satan and Adam
- Released: 1991
- Studio: Giant Sound
- Genre: Blues
- Label: Flying Fish
- Producer: Rachel Faro

Satan and Adam chronology
Harlem Blues (1991)	Mother Mojo (1993)

Harlem Blues is the debut album by the American musical duo Satan and Adam (Sterling Magee and Adam Gussow), released in 1991. The liner notes penned by Adam relay the history of the pair. The duo supported the album with a European tour. Harlem Blues was nominated for a W. C. Handy Award for "Traditional Blues Album of the Year".

== Production ==
The album was produced by Rachel Faro. Satan was reluctant to enter a studio, and had to be goaded by his wife. Most of the duo's original songs came together during live street performances, with Satan writing the majority of the lyrics. In addition to guitar, he played a drum kit that he assembled from various percussive instruments. "Don't Get Around Much Anymore" is a version of the Duke Ellington song. "Sweet Home Chicago" is a cover of the Roosevelt Sykes song.

== Critical reception ==
Professional ratings
Review scores
Source	Rating
AllMusic	4.5/5 stars
Los Angeles Times	3/4 stars
MusicHound Blues: The Essential Album Guide	4/5 stars
The Penguin Guide to Blues Recordings	2.5/4 stars
The Philadelphia Inquirer	3.5/4 stars

The Washington Post called Harlem Blues "one of the true sleepers (and keepers) of the year," writing that the duo "make intensely visceral, highly idiosyncratic music—a clangorous, juke-joint jumble of blues, funk, soul and jazz." The Los Angeles Times concluded that "the songs aren't much, but wild performances setting Adam's wailing harmonica against Satan's slashing guitar, runaway drums and searing vocals reminiscent of Captain Beefheart in his blues shouter mold sure are." The Chicago Tribune labeled the album "an out-of-left-field charmer."

The Philadelphia Inquirer praised the "grinning inventiveness ... that is fierce, funny and hard to find." The Winston-Salem Journal considered the album to be "one of the most vital and unpretentious blues albums in recent memory," writing that such "gloriously raw performances ... have not been heard since the early works of Howlin' Wolf." The Philadelphia Daily News listed Harlem Blues as the ninth best album of 1991.

AllMusic wrote that "Satan and Adam stick to a basic acoustic blues duo, but their rhythms and techniques occasionally stray into funkier, jazzier territory."

== Track listing ==
No.	Title	Length
1.	"I Want You"
2.	"Groovy People"
3.	"Read My Lips"
4.	"Don't Get Around Much Anymore"
5.	"Ride the Wind"
6.	"Down Home Blues"
7.	"Sweet Home Chicago"
8.	"I Create the Music"
9.	"C.C. Rider"
10.	"Sunshine in the Shade"
