= Satan and Adam =

American blues duo

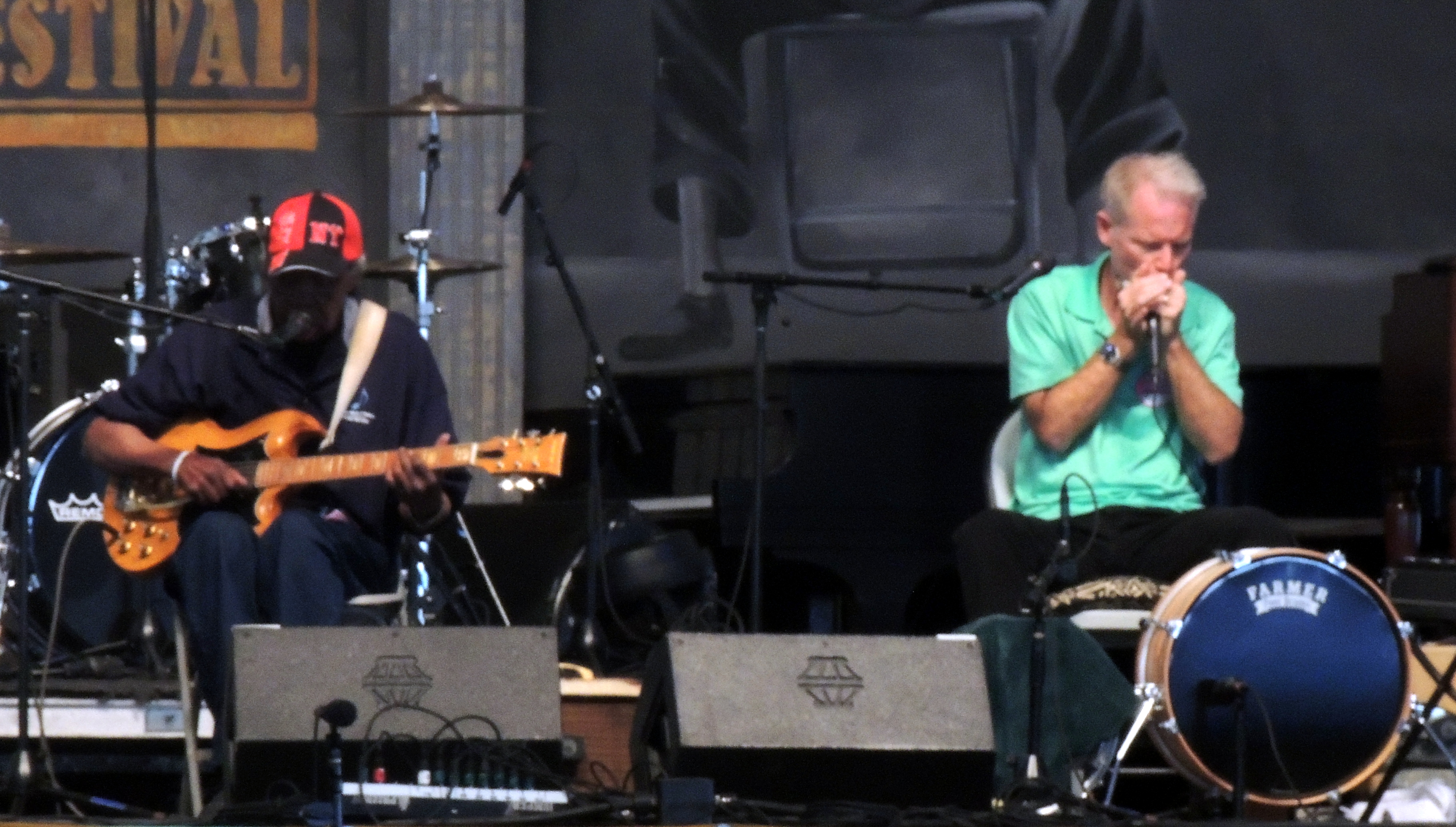
- Satan (left) & Adam (right) performing at Jazzfest in 2012

Background information
- Origin: New York City, New York, United States
- Genres: Blues
- Years active: 1980s–1998; 2005-2006; 2011; 2013
- Members: Sterling Magee; Adam Gussow
- Website: www.modernbluesharmonica.com/satan_and_adam.html

Satan and Adam was an American blues duo consisting of Sterling Magee, known by his stage name "Mister Satan" (May 20, 1936 – 6 September 2020, in Gulfport, Florida), and Adam Gussow (born April 3, 1958 in New York City, New York), who were a fixture on Harlem's sidewalks in the late 1980s and early 1990s.

Magee sang in a style that fuses blues with elements of soul and rap, playing electric guitar, and used both feet to stomp out polyrhythms on a homemade percussion setup that included hi-hat cymbals topped with tambourines and maracas. Gussow played amplified harmonica. Together, Satan and Adam have, as journalist Richard Skelley noted, "redefined and shaped the sound of modern blues so much that 'I Want You' from their Harlem Blues debut was included on a Rhino Records release, Modern Blues of the 1990s.

== History ==
Magee was raised in St. Petersburg, Florida. A sometime-songwriter for Jesse Stone, Magee recorded several near-hits on Ray Charles's Tangerine label in the early 1960s, including "Get in My Arms Little Girl." His proficiency on guitar earned him gigs with a number of rhythm-and-blues performers, including James Brown, King Curtis, Big Maybelle, Joey Dee and the Starliters, and a transvestite duo known as The Illusions That Create Confusion. In the mid 1970s, he played sessions with Paul Winley and the Harlem Underground, a loose-knit unit that included George Benson.

In the late 1970s, Magee gave up guitar, refused to be identified by his birth-name and demanded that his associates call him 'Satan'. His longtime friend and business manager, Bobby Robinson rented him an apartment and put a guitar in his hands. Soon Magee was strolling the streets, playing for what he later referred to as his "wino buddies." By 1983, he had added a hi-hat cymbal to his mix and begun to perform as a one-man band on 125th Street in front of the New York Telephone Company office, sometimes accompanied by drummer Pancho Morales and other musicians.

Around this time Gussow, a Princeton graduate and English M.A. student at Columbia University, first saw Magee and his trio performing on the corner of 114th Street and Broadway. Gussow, a guitarist and harmonica player whose performing experience had previously been limited to a handful of high school and college bands, was galvanized by the encounter. After dropping out of grad school, Gussow spent several years as a part-time street performer in New York and Europe. Gussow's transformation from an academic to a blues player was facilitated by lessons he took from his mentor, New York harmonica virtuoso Nat Riddles, who had performed and recorded with Larry Johnson, Odetta, and others, and by his acculturation into the jam session life at Dan Lynch, a storied East Village juke joint.

In October 1986, Gussow encountered Magee again, purely by chance, this time at Magee's regular stretch of sidewalk near the Apollo Theater. Gussow, a semi-seasoned street performer by this point, sat in.

What began as a streetside encounter ended up blossoming into a twelve-year success story. The duo's initial notoriety accrued in the summer of 1987, when the members of U2 wandered by Magee and Gussow with a film crew in tow, capturing the Harlem duo at work. Thirty-nine seconds of Magee's original composition, "Freedom for My People" were ultimately included in the Rattle and Hum documentary and album.

Gussow left New York several times over the next year to play harmonica with a touring production of Big River, but always returned to Harlem. As Magee refined and developed his one-man band sound with the addition of a second hi-hat cymbal and wooden sounding board, Gussow was forced to evolve an equally innovative sound, one in which traditional amplified Chicago harp was cross-fertilized with funk-guitar licks and jazz sax phrasings. Magee and Gussow exclusively engaged in street performance until 1990, when they recorded a demo at Giant Sound in New York, opened for Buddy Guy at a Summerstage concert in Central Park, and began to play club gigs at a restaurant called Chelsea Commons (24th St. and 10th Ave). That summer they traveled to Halifax, Nova Scotia and participated in the International Busker Fest. After three and a half years of relative anonymity, they finally had a calling card, and a name: Magee and Gussow were now "Satan and Adam."

In 1991, after being discovered during a steady gig at a woman's bar in Greenwich Village, they signed with major management, went on a tour of the UK with Bo Diddley, and released their first album, Harlem Blues. The album caused a minor sensation. Quint Davis, the founder of the New Orleans Jazz and Heritage Festival, told their manager, "I don't know where you found them, but I'm going to make them stars."

Between 1991 and 1998, Satan and Adam toured widely, including Italy, Switzerland, Finland, and Australia and countless club gigs in the eastern half of the U.S. They recorded two more albums: Mother Mojo (1993) and Living on the River (1996). They performed at blues, jazz, and folk festivals in Philadelphia, Chicago, Newport, Saratoga Springs, Kansas City, Los Angeles, and many other locations.

In 1996 they were the cover story in Living Blues magazine—the first time in that magazine's history that an interracial act had ever been featured on the cover.

After a charmed rise, the duo's fortunes took a disastrous downward turn in 1998 when Magee, who had recently relocated from Harlem to Brookneal, Virginia, had a nervous breakdown and, after briefly resurfacing, dropped completely out of sight. Satan and Adam effectively dissolved as a partnership.

After several years' silence, Magee slowly reemerged. Starting in 2000, he lived at the Boca Ciega Center, an adult care facility in Gulfport, Florida, a small community next to St. Petersburg. His guitar skills, which vanished with his breakdown, partially reconstituted themselves with the help of harpist T. C. Carr and other Tampa-area blues performers who had dedicated themselves to furthering his comeback. In late 2005 and early 2006, Satan and Adam played several comeback gigs in Gulfport and Oxford, Mississippi, where Gussow is currently a professor of English and Southern Studies at the University of Mississippi.

Beginning in the summer of 2007, the duo began to play occasional road dates and added a drummer, Tampa resident David Laycock (a.k.a., "Dave on Drums"). A book by Gussow entitled Journeyman's Road, collecting magazine columns and other of his writings, was published by the University of Tennessee Press in 2007 and further detailed the Satan and Adam story. In 2008, Gussow released a double CD of early work by the duo entitled Word on the Street: Harlem Recordings, 1989, for download on his Modern Blues Harmonica website (see below).

In 2011, the duo released a new album, Back in the Game.

On May 5, 2013, the duo performed at Jazzfest in New Orleans, their first appearance there since their debut in 1991.

A feature-length documentary on the duo entitled Satan & Adam, directed by award-winning filmmaker V. Scott Balcerek and featuring cameos by The Edge, Rev. Al Sharpton, journalist Peter Noel, and others, was as of June 2019 streaming on Netflix.

On September 6, 2020, Magee died in hospice care of complications from COVID-19 in Gulfport, Florida.

== Discography ==
- Harlem Blues (Flying Fish, 1991)
- Mother Mojo (Flying Fish, 1993)
- Living On The River (Rave On Productions, 1996)
- Word On The Street (Modern Blues Harmonica, 2008)
- Back In The Game (Modern Blues Harmonica, 2011)

== Other sources ==
- Mister Satan’s Apprentice: A Blues Memoir Adam Gussow (New York: Pantheon, 1998)
- Gussow, Adam. Mister Satan's Apprentice. Minneapolis: University of Minnesota Press, 2009.
