= Bear Swamp Preserve =

Protected area in Westerlo, New York, US

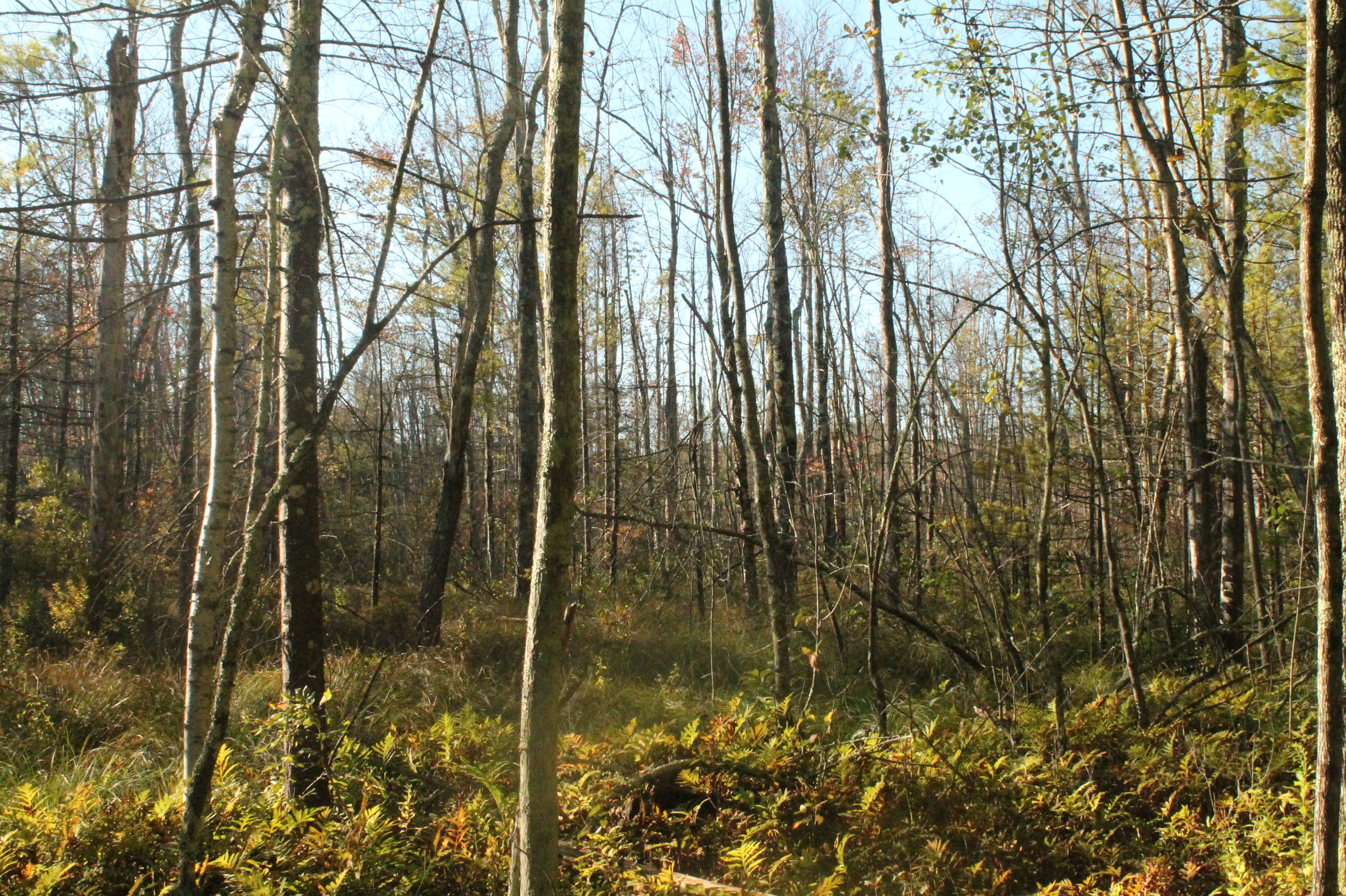
- Bear Swamp Preserve, September 2013

- Location within New York
- Location: Westerlo, New York
- Coordinates: 42.4742°N 74.0594°W
- Area: 310 acres (1.3 km^{2})
- Governing body: The Nature Conservancy

U.S. National Natural Landmark
- Designated: May 1973

Bear Swamp Preserve is a Nature Conservancy preserve and National Natural Landmark in Westerlo, New York. It consists of a pond and surrounding 310 acres (1.3 km^{2}) of swamp and woodland. It is recognized for its great laurel tree population. It has two nature trails totaling about two miles (3.2 km) in length.

== See also ==
- List of National Natural Landmarks in New York
