= Poiret =

Poiret is a French language surname. Notable people with the surname include:

- Jean Poiret, French author
- Jean Louis Georges Poiret, Lieutenant-Governor of Guinea
- Jean Louis Marie Poiret, French clergyman, botanist, and explorer
- Jeanne Poiret Boivin, French jewelry designer
- Paul Poiret, French fashion designer
