= Adam Gussow =

American musical artist

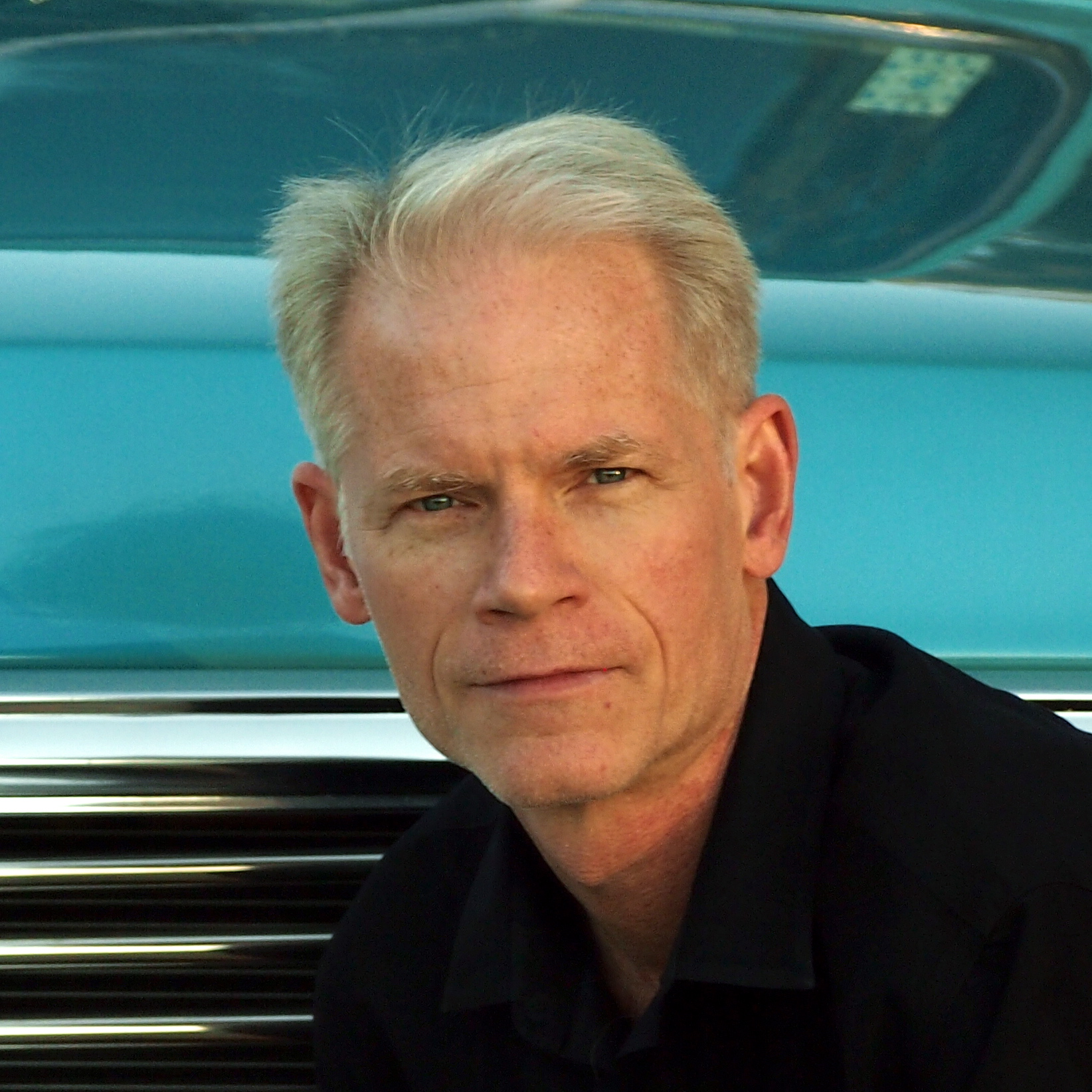

Background information
- Born: April 3, 1958 (age 68); New York City, U.S.
- Genre: Blues
- Occupations: Musician; author
- Instrument: Harmonica
- Years active: 1986–present
- Formerly of: Satan and Adam
- Website: www.modernbluesharmonica.com

Adam Gussow (born April 3, 1958) is an American blues harmonica player and author, best known as a member of Satan and Adam.

== Early life ==
Gussow was born in New York City and grew up in nearby Congers, the son of a Jewish father and Protestant mother. He earned an undergraduate degree in 1979 and a doctorate in 2000, both from Princeton University.

== Career ==
=== Music ===
Between 1986 and 1998, Gussow played harmonica in the blues duo Satan and Adam, alongside guitarist and vocalist Sterling Magee. Beginning as street performers in Harlem, they released five albums from 1991 to 2011, including Harlem Blues (1991), which was nominated for a W. C. Handy Award. A clip of the duo performing on 125th Street appeared in the U2 documentary Rattle and Hum.

Since 2010, Gussow has performed as a one-man band, using foot-operated percussion while playing harmonica. He released the solo album Kick and Stomp in 2010. He also performs with Sir Rod & the Blues Doctors, a trio that includes Sterling Magee's nephew, Roderick "Sir Rod" Patterson.

=== Academia ===
Gussow is a professor of English and southern studies at the University of Mississippi. His scholarship focuses on the blues as a response to social violence and the cultural mythology of the music. His book Seems Like Murder Here: Southern Violence and the Blues Tradition (2002) was awarded the Holman Award from the Society for the Study of Southern Literature.

In 2017, he published Beyond the Crossroads: The Devil and the Blues Tradition, an investigation into the "blues devil" motif, which won the Living Blues Readers' Poll for Best Blues Book.

== Bibliography ==
- Seems Like Murder Here: Southern Violence and the Blues Tradition. Chicago: University of Chicago Press, 2002.
- Mister Satan's Apprentice. Minneapolis: University of Minnesota Press, 2009.
- Journeyman's Road: Modern Blues Lives from Faulkner's Mississippi to Post-9/11 New York. Knoxville: University of Tennessee Press, 2007.
- Busker's Holiday. Modern Blues Harmonica: 2015
- Beyond the Crossroads: The Devil and the Blues Tradition. Chapel Hill: University of North Carolina Press, 2017.
- Whose Blues? Facing Up to Race and the Future of the Music. Chapel Hill: University of North Carolina Press, 2020.
