= Pisano (surname) =

Pisano is a surname. Notable people with the surname include:

- Albert P. Pisano (born 1954), American engineer
- Andrea Pisano (1290–1348), Italian sculptor and architect
- Andrea Pisano (water polo) (born 1961), Italian water polo player
- Bernardo Pisano (1490–1548), Italian composer of the early 16th century
- Berto Pisano (1928–2002), Italian composer, conductor, arranger and musician
- Bonanno Pisano (fl. 1179–1186) Italian sculptor, sometimes credited with being the architect of the Leaning Tower of Pisa
- Edmundo Pisano (1919–1997), Chilean botanist and geographer
- Eros Pisano, (born 1987), Italian footballer
- Etta D. Pisano, American radiologist
- Francesco Pisano (born 1986), Italian footballer
- Franco Pisano (1922–1977), Italian composer, conductor, arranger, and musician
- Gary Pisano, American economist
- Giorgio Pisanò (1924–1997), Italian journalist and politician
- Giovanni Pisano (c. 1250–c. 1315), Italian sculptor
- Giunta Pisano (fl. 1202-1236), Italian painter
- Giuseppe Pisano (born 1988), Italian-born German footballer
- Isabel Pisano (1944–2025), Uruguayan actress and journalist
- Joel A. Pisano (1949–2021), American judge
- John Pisano (1931–2024), American jazz musician
- Judith Belushi-Pisano (1951–2024), American radio and television producer
- Leonardo Pisano (c. 1170–c. 1250), Italian mathematician also known as Fibonacci
- Manuel Pisano (born 2006) Italian footballer
- Marco Pisano (born 1981) Italian footballer
- Margarita Pisano (1932–2015), Chilean architect and feminist
- Matías Pisano (born 1991), Argentine footballer
- Nicola Pisano (c. 1220/1225–c. 1284), Italian sculptor
- Nicolás Pisano (born 1982), Argentine footballer
- Nino Pisano (fl. 1349-1368), Italian sculptor
- Octavio Pisano, Mexican-born American actor
- Oscar Pisano (born 1956), Argentine footballer
- Paola Pisano (born 1977), Italian academic and politician
- Rosita Pisano (1919–1975), Italian actress

== See also ==
- Pisano (disambiguation)
- Pisani
