= Pisana =

Pisana, an Italian feminine adjective referring to Pisa, may refer to:

- Pisana (Rome), an administrative subdivision of Rome
- Pisana Cornaro (died 1769), Dogaressa of Venice
- Carta Pisana, a map made at the end of the 13th century found in Pisa, hence its name
- Cetonia aurata pisana, a subspecies of the rose chafer
- Mucca Pisana, a breed of cattle from Tuscany, in central Italy
- Rocca Pisana, a sixteenth-century villa for the Pisani family
- Theba pisana, a snail

== See also ==
- Pisano (disambiguation)
- Pisani (disambiguation)
