= Niccolo Pisano (disambiguation) =

Niccolo Pisano or its variations may refer to:

- Nicola Pisano, 13th century Italian sculptor
- Nicolás Pisano, Argentine footballer
- Niccolò Pisani, 14th century Venetian admiral
- Niccolò Pisano, Italian painter of the late 15th and early 16th century
