= Pisani (surname) =

Pisani is an Italian surname which is also common in Malta. Notable people with the surname include:

- Alfred Pisani (born 1939), Maltese hotelier
- Alvise Pisani (1664–1741), Doge of Venice
- André du Pisani (born 1949), Namibian political scientist
- Andrea Pisani (1662–1718), Venetian admiral
- Andrea Pisani (born 1987), Italian footballer
- Angelo Pisani (died 1475), Italian Roman Catholic prelate, Bishop of Bagnoregio
- Bob Pisani (born 1956), news correspondent for the financial news network CNBC
- Carmelo Borg Pisani (1915–1942), Maltese nationalist and Fascist
- Edgard Pisani (1918–2016), French statesman, philosopher, and writer
- Elizabeth Pisani (born 1964), American HIV Epidemiologist
- Eugenio Pisani (born 1991), Italian auto racing driver
- Federico Pisani (1974–1997), Italian professional footballer
- Félix Pisani (1831–1920), French chemist and mineralogist
- Fernando Pisani (born 1976), Canadian professional ice hockey winger
- Francesco Pisani (1494–1570), Italian Cardinal
- Gastón Pisani (born 1983), Argentine football midfielder with Italian citizenship
- Giovanni Battista Pisani (17th century), Italian mathematician
- John Pisani (born 1947), American soccer midfielder
- Joseph Pisani (born 1976), American Swiss artist, abstract painter, and photographer
- Joseph R. Pisani (1929–2016), New York politician
- Jurgen Pisani (born 1992), Maltese footballer
- Luigi Pisani (1522–1570), Italian Roman Catholic bishop and cardinal
- Maria Adeodata Pisani (1806–1855), Maltese saint
- Niccolò Pisani (fl.1350–1354), Venetian admiral
- Paul Pisani (1852–1933), Franciscan friar and historian from France
- Pietro Pisani (1871–1960), Catholic archbishop and diplomat of the Holy See
- Sandra Pisani (1959–2022), Australian Olympic field hockey player
- Tiffany Pisani (born 1992), British-Maltese model
- Vettor Pisani (died 1380), Venetian admiral

== See also ==
- Pisani (disambiguation)
- Pisano (surname)
