= Crucifix =

Christian cross featuring image of Jesus

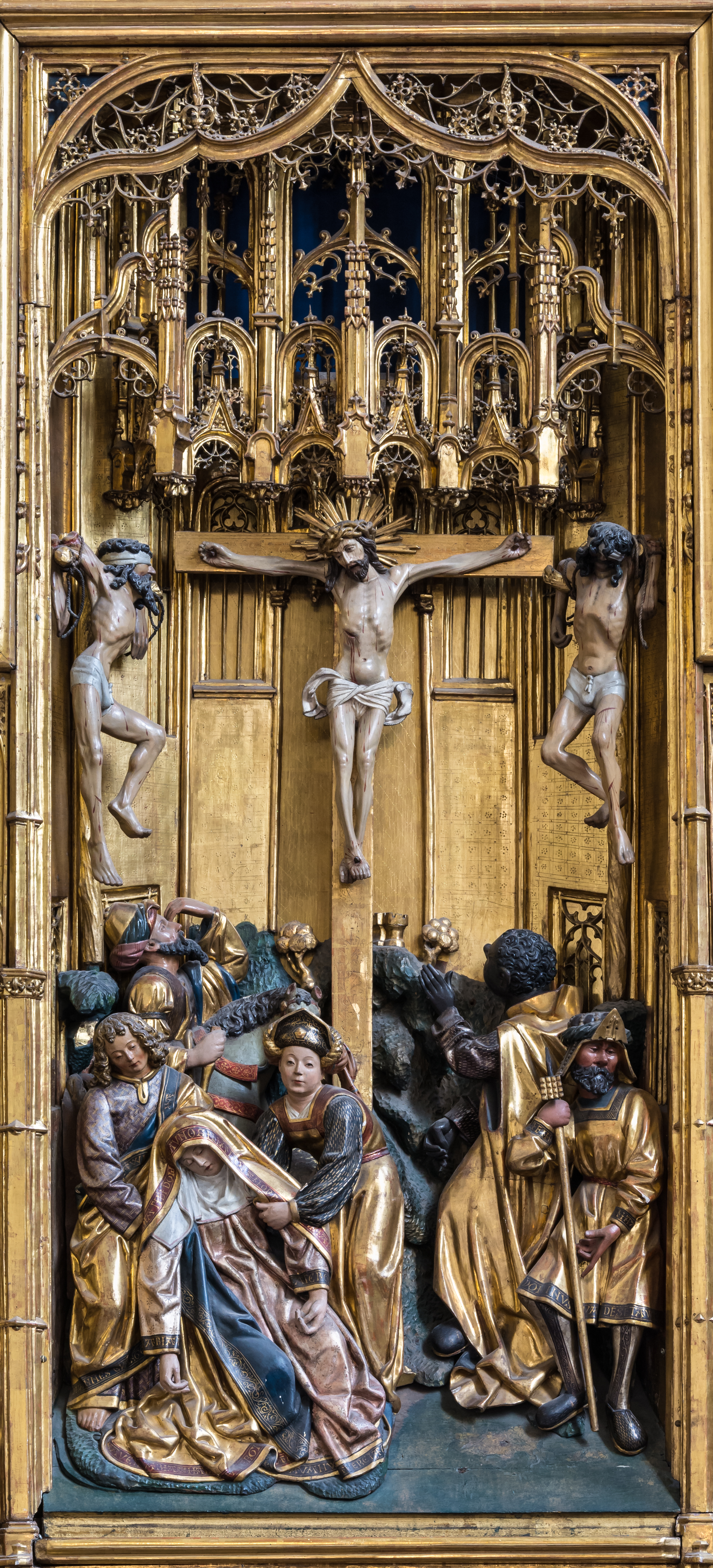
Crucifixion of Jesus at the winged triptych at the Church of the Teutonic Order in Vienna, Austria. Woodcarvings by an anonymous master; polychromy by Jan van Wavere, Mechelen, signed 1520. This altarpiece was originally made for St. Mary's Church, Gdańsk, and came to Vienna in 1864.

A crucifix (from the Latin cruci fixus meaning '(one) fixed to a cross') is a cross with an image of Jesus on it, as distinct from a bare cross. The representation of Jesus himself on the cross is referred to in English as the corpus (Latin for 'body'). The crucifix emphasizes Jesus' sacrifice, including his death by crucifixion, which Christians believe brought about the redemption of mankind. Most crucifixes portray Jesus on a Latin cross, rather than a Tau cross or a Coptic cross.

The crucifix is a principal symbol for many groups of Christians, and one of the most common forms of the Crucifixion in the arts. It is especially important in the Catholic Church, and is also used in the Lutheran Churches, Anglican Churches, Eastern Orthodox Church, and in most Oriental Orthodox Churches (except the Armenian Church and Syriac Church). The symbol is less common in churches of other Protestant denominations, and in the Assyrian Church of the East and Armenian Apostolic Church, which prefer to use a cross without the figure of Jesus (the corpus).

Western crucifixes usually have a three-dimensional corpus, but in Eastern Orthodoxy Jesus' body is normally painted on the cross, or in low relief. Strictly speaking, to be a crucifix, the cross must be three-dimensional, but this distinction is not always observed. An entire painting of the crucifixion of Jesus including a landscape background and other figures is not a crucifix either.

Large crucifixes high across the central axis of a church are known by the Old English term rood. By the Late Middle Ages these were a near-universal feature of Western churches, but they are now very rare. Modern Roman Catholic churches and many Lutheran churches often have a crucifix above the altar on the wall; for the celebration of Mass, the Roman Rite of the Catholic Church requires that "on or close to the altar there is to be a cross with a figure of Christ crucified".

== Description ==
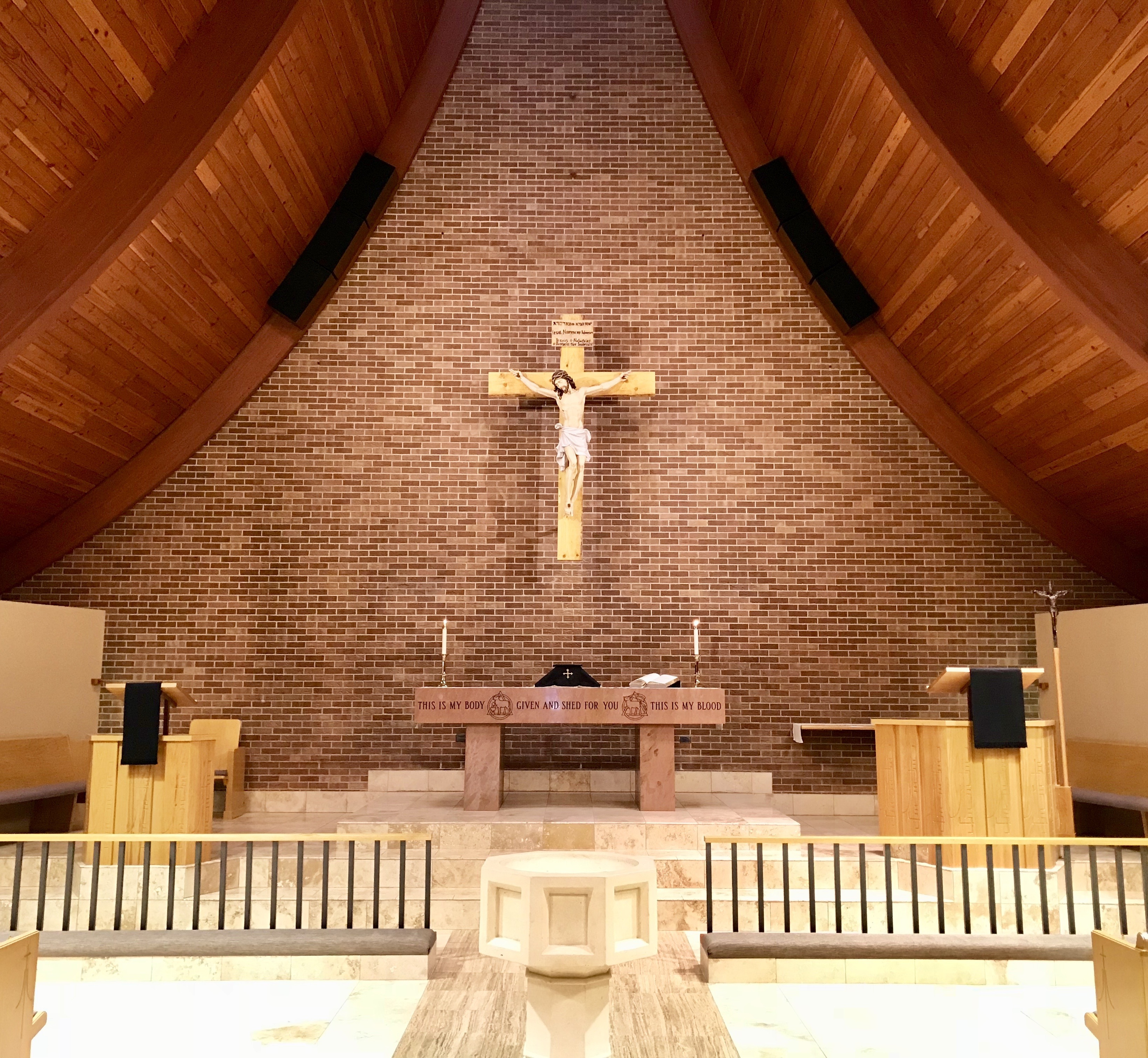
A crucifix in the chancel of a Lutheran church

The standard, four-pointed Latin crucifix (used in the Catholic and Lutheran traditions) consists of an upright post or stipes and a single crosspiece to which the sufferer's arms were nailed. There may also be a short projecting nameplate, showing the letters INRI (Greek: INBI). The Russian Orthodox crucifix usually has an additional third crossbar, to which the feet are nailed, and which is angled upward toward the penitent thief Saint Dismas (to the viewer's left) and downward toward the impenitent thief Gestas (to the viewer's right). The corpus of Eastern crucifixes is normally a two-dimensional or low relief icon that shows Jesus as already dead, his face peaceful and somber. They are rarely three-dimensional figures as in the Western tradition, although these may be found where Western influences are strong, but are more typically icons painted on a piece of wood shaped to include the double-barred cross and perhaps the edge of Christ's hips and halo, and no background. More sculptural small crucifixes in metal relief are also used in Orthodoxy (see gallery examples), including as pectoral crosses and blessing crosses.

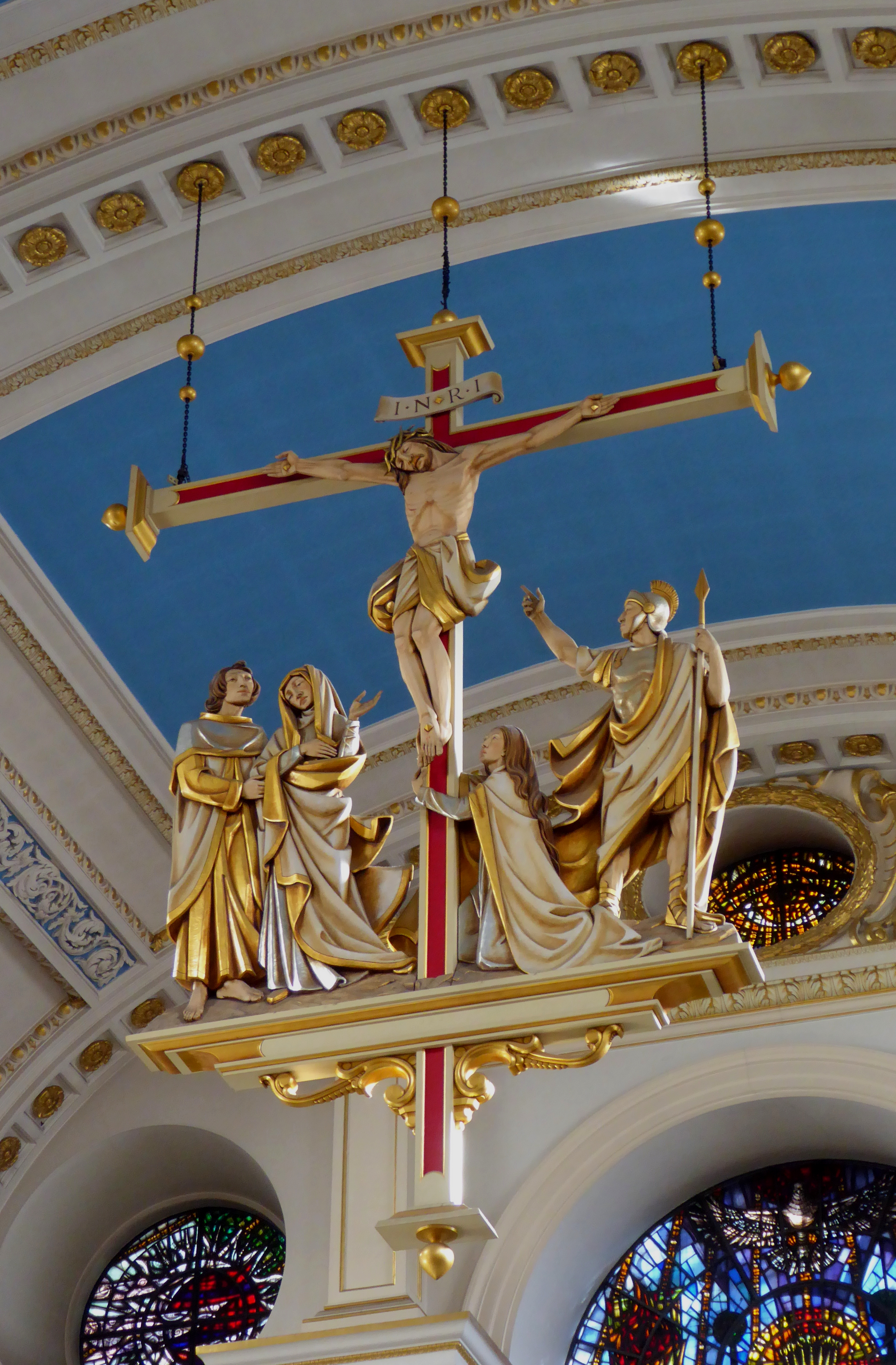
The Anglican Communion also uses the crucifix; this one is in the church of St Mary-le-Bow in London

Western crucifixes may show Christ dead or alive, the presence of the spear wound in his ribs traditionally indicating that he is dead. In either case his face very often shows his suffering. In the Eastern Orthodox tradition he has normally been shown as dead since around the end of the period of Byzantine Iconoclasm. Eastern crucifixes have Jesus' two feet nailed side by side, rather than crossed one above the other, as Western crucifixes have shown them since around the 13th century. The crown of thorns is also generally absent in Eastern crucifixes, since the emphasis is not on Christ's suffering, but on his triumph over sin and death. The S-shaped position of Jesus' body on the cross is a Byzantine innovation of the late 10th century, though also found in the German Gero Cross of the same date. Probably more from Byzantine influence, it spread elsewhere in the West, especially to Italy, by the Romanesque period, though it was more usual in painting than sculpted crucifixes. It was in Italy that the emphasis was put on Jesus' suffering and realistic details, during a process of general humanization of Christ favored by the Franciscan order. During the 13th century the suffering Italian model (Christus patiens) triumphed over the traditional Byzantine one (Christus gloriosus) anywhere in Europe also due to the works of artists such as Giunta Pisano and Cimabue. Since the Renaissance the "S"-shape is generally much less pronounced. Eastern Christian blessing crosses will often have the Crucifixion depicted on one side, and the Resurrection on the other, illustrating Eastern Orthodox theology's understanding of the Crucifixion and Resurrection as two intimately related aspects of the same act of salvation.

Another, symbolic, depiction shows a triumphant Christ (Latin: Christus triumphans), clothed in robes, rather than stripped as for his execution, with arms raised, appearing to rise up from the cross, sometimes accompanied by "rays of light", or an aureole encircling his body. He may be robed as a prophet, crowned as a king, and vested in a stole as Great High Priest.

On some crucifixes a skull and crossbones are shown below the corpus, referring to Golgotha (Calvary), the site at which Jesus was crucified, which the Gospels say means in Hebrew "the place of the skull." (Note: In fact this is clearly Aramaic rather than Hebrew. Gûlgaltâ is the Aramaic for 'skull'. The name appears in all of the gospels except Luke, which calls the place simply Kranion, 'the Skull', with no Aramaic. See Aramaic of Jesus) Medieval tradition held that it was the burial-place of Adam and Eve, and that the cross of Christ was raised directly over Adam's skull, so many crucifixes manufactured in Catholic countries still show the skull and crossbones below the corpus.

Very large crucifixes have been built, the largest being the Cross in the Woods in Michigan, with a 31 feet (9.4 m) high statue.

== Usage ==
In the early Church, many Christians hung a cross on the eastern wall of their house in order to indicate the eastward direction of prayer. Prayer in front of a crucifix, which is seen as a sacramental, is often part of devotion for Christians, especially those worshipping in a church, also privately. The person may sit, stand, or kneel in front of the crucifix, sometimes looking at it in contemplation, or merely in front of it with head bowed or eyes closed. During the Middle Ages small crucifixes, generally hung on a wall, became normal in the personal cells or living quarters first of monks, then all clergy, followed by the homes of the laity, spreading down from the top of society as these became cheap enough for the average person to afford. Most towns had a large crucifix erected as a monument, or some other shrine at the crossroads of the town. Building on the ancient custom, many Catholics, Lutherans and Anglicans hang a crucifix inside their homes and also use the crucifix as a focal point of a home altar. The wealthy erected proprietary chapels as they could afford to do this.

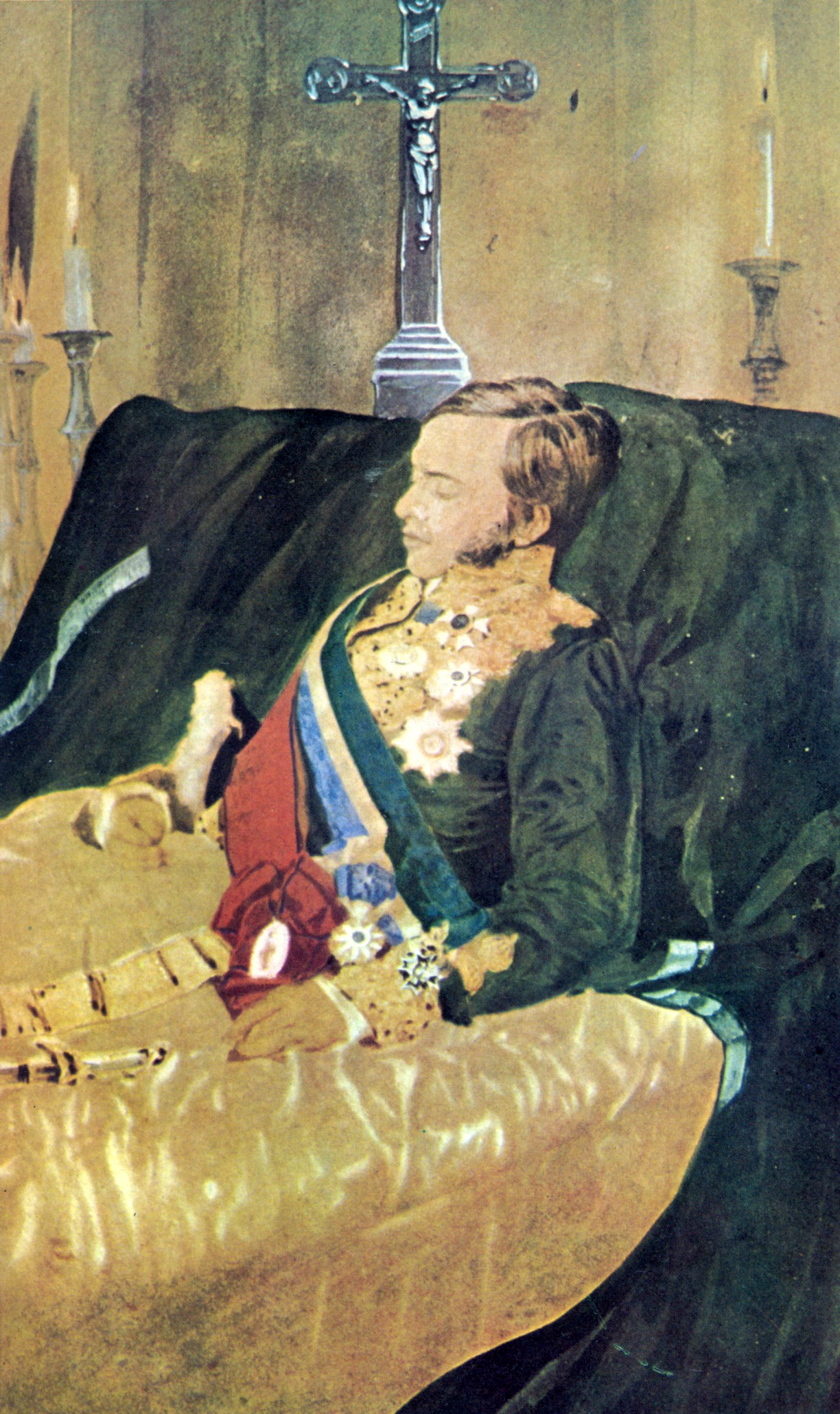
The Marquis of Paraná, Prime Minister of Brazil, is shown lying in state in 1856. In the background are candles and a metal crucifix.

Catholic (both Eastern and Western), Eastern Orthodox, Oriental Orthodox, Lutheran, and Anglican Christians generally use the crucifix in public religious services. They believe use of the crucifix is in keeping with the statement by Paul the Apostle in 1 Corinthians: "we preach Christ crucified, a stumbling block to Jews and folly to Gentiles, but to those who are called, both Jews and Greeks, Christ the power of God and the wisdom of God".

In the West, altar crosses and processional crosses began to be crucifixes in the 11th century, which became general around the 14th century, as they became cheaper. The Roman Rite requires that "either on the altar or near it, there is to be a cross, with the figure of Christ crucified upon it, a cross clearly visible to the assembled people. It is desirable that such a cross should remain near the altar even outside of liturgical celebrations, so as to call to mind for the faithful the saving Passion of the Lord." The requirement of the altar cross was also mentioned in pre-1970 editions of the Roman Missal, though not in the original 1570 Roman Missal of Pope Pius V. The Rite of Funerals says that the Gospel Book, the Bible, or a cross (which will generally be in crucifix form) may be placed on the coffin for a Requiem Mass, but a second standing cross is not to be placed near the coffin if the altar cross can be easily seen from the body of the church.

Eastern Christian liturgical processions called crucessions include a cross or crucifix at their head. In the Eastern Orthodox Church, the crucifix is often placed above the iconostasis in the church. In the Russian Orthodox Church a large crucifix ("Golgotha") is placed behind the Holy Table (altar). During Matins of Good Friday, a large crucifix is taken in procession to the center of the church, where it is venerated by the faithful. Sometimes the soma (corpus) is removable and is taken off the crucifix at Vespers that evening during the Gospel lesson describing the Descent from the Cross. The empty cross may then remain in the centre of the church until the Paschal vigil (local practices vary). The blessing cross which the priest uses to bless the faithful at the dismissal will often have the crucifix on one side and an icon of the Resurrection of Jesus on the other, the side with the Resurrection being used on Sundays and during Paschaltide, and the crucifix on other days.

Modern anti-Christians have used an inverted (upside-down) crucifix when showing disdain for Jesus Christ or the Catholic Church which believes in his divinity. According to Christian tradition, Saint Peter was martyred by being crucified upside-down.

== Controversies ==
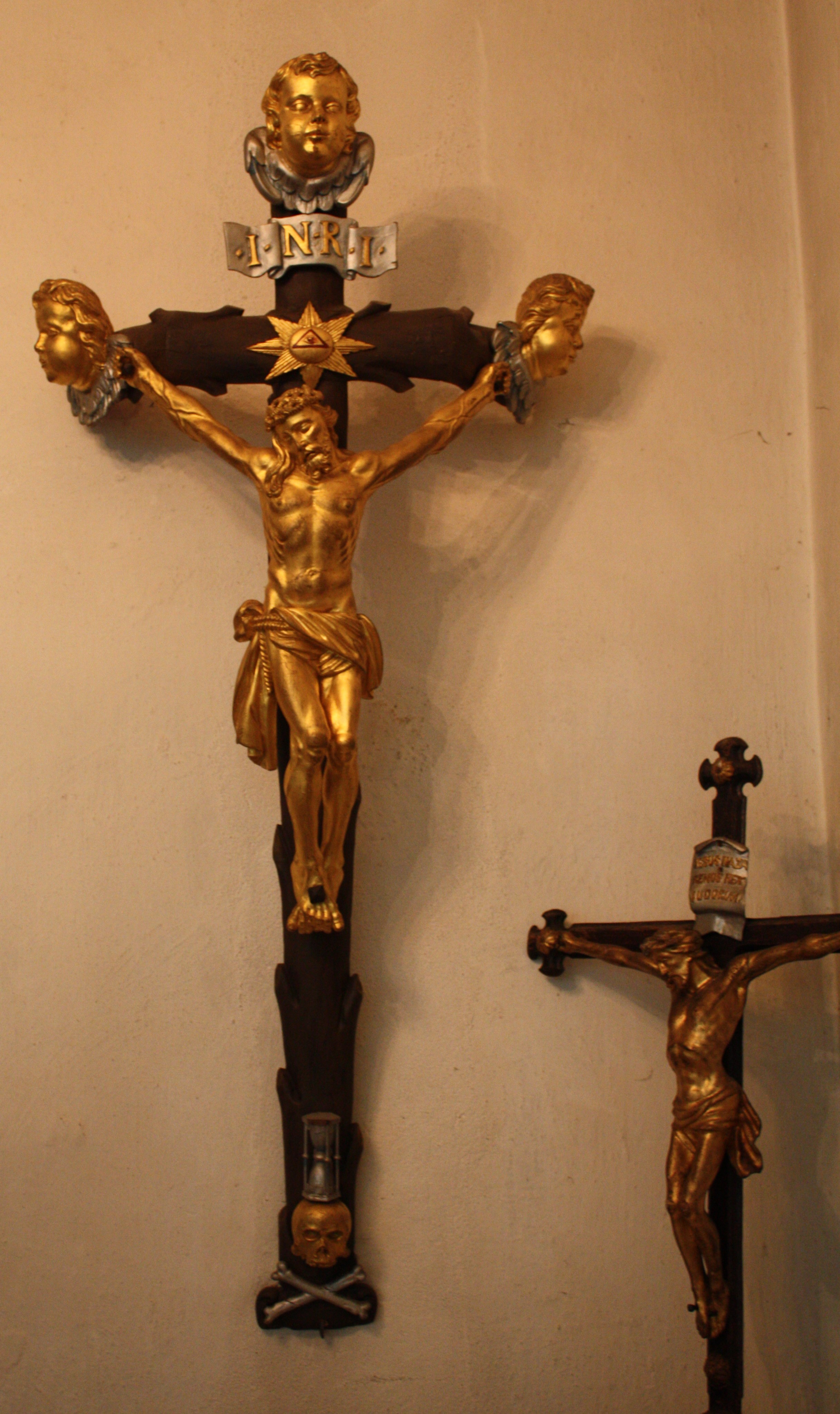
Lutherans retained the use of the crucifix; depicted is Martin Luther Church in Oberwiesenthal, Germany.

=== Protestant Reformation ===
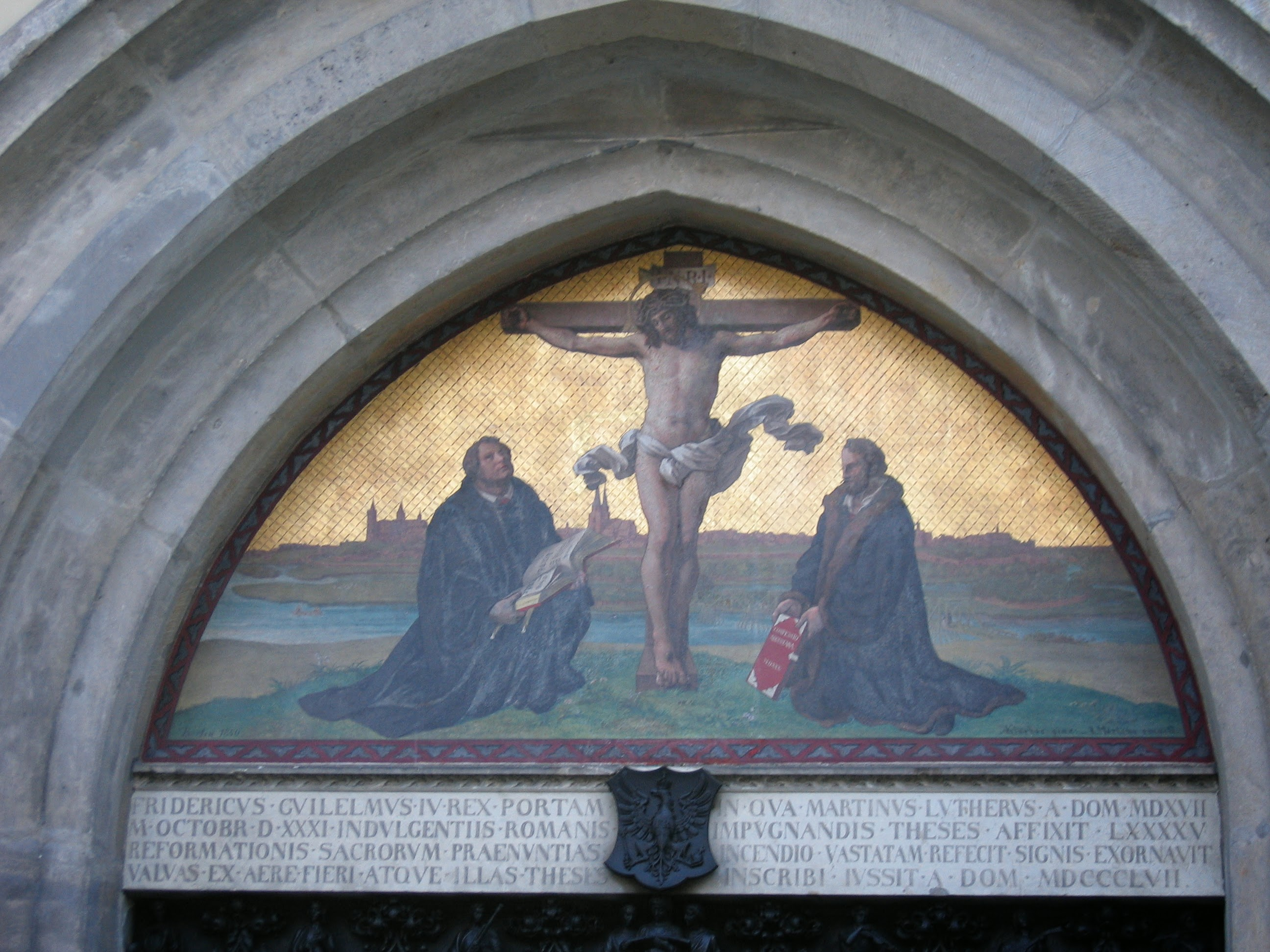
The tympanum of Thesis Door at the Castle Church in Wittenberg depicts Martin Luther and Philip Melanchthon kneeling in prayer, facing the crucified Christ.

In the Moravian Church, Nicolaus Zinzendorf had an experience in which he believed he encountered Jesus. Seeing a painting of a crucifix, Zinzendorf fell on his knees vowing to glorify Jesus after contemplating on the wounds of Christ and an inscription that stated "This is what I have done for you, what will you do for me?".

The Lutheran Churches retained the use of the crucifix, "justifying their continued use of medieval crucifixes with the same arguments employed since the Middle Ages, as is evident from the example of the altar of the Holy Cross in the Cistercian church of Doberan." Martin Luther did not object to them, and this was among his differences with Andreas Karlstadt as early as 1525. At the time of the Reformation, Luther retained the crucifix in the Lutheran Church and they remain the center of worship in Lutheran parishes across Europe. In the United States, however, Lutheranism came under the influence of Calvinism, and the plain cross came to be used in some churches, though many Lutheran churches continue to use the crucifix.

In contrast to the practice of the Catholic Church, Moravian Church and Lutheran Churches, the early Reformed Churches rejected the use of the crucifix, and indeed the unadorned cross, along with other traditional religious imagery, as idolatrous. Calvin, considered to be the father of the Reformed Church, was strongly opposed to both cross and crucifix. In England (where Anglican Christianity is the dominant faith), the Royal Chapels of Elizabeth I were most unusual among local churches in retaining crucifixes, following the Queen's conservative tastes. These disappeared under her successor, James I, and their brief re-appearance in the early 1620s when James' heir was seeking a Spanish marriage was the subject of rumour and close observation by both Catholics and Protestants; when the match fell through they disappeared.

=== Modern ===
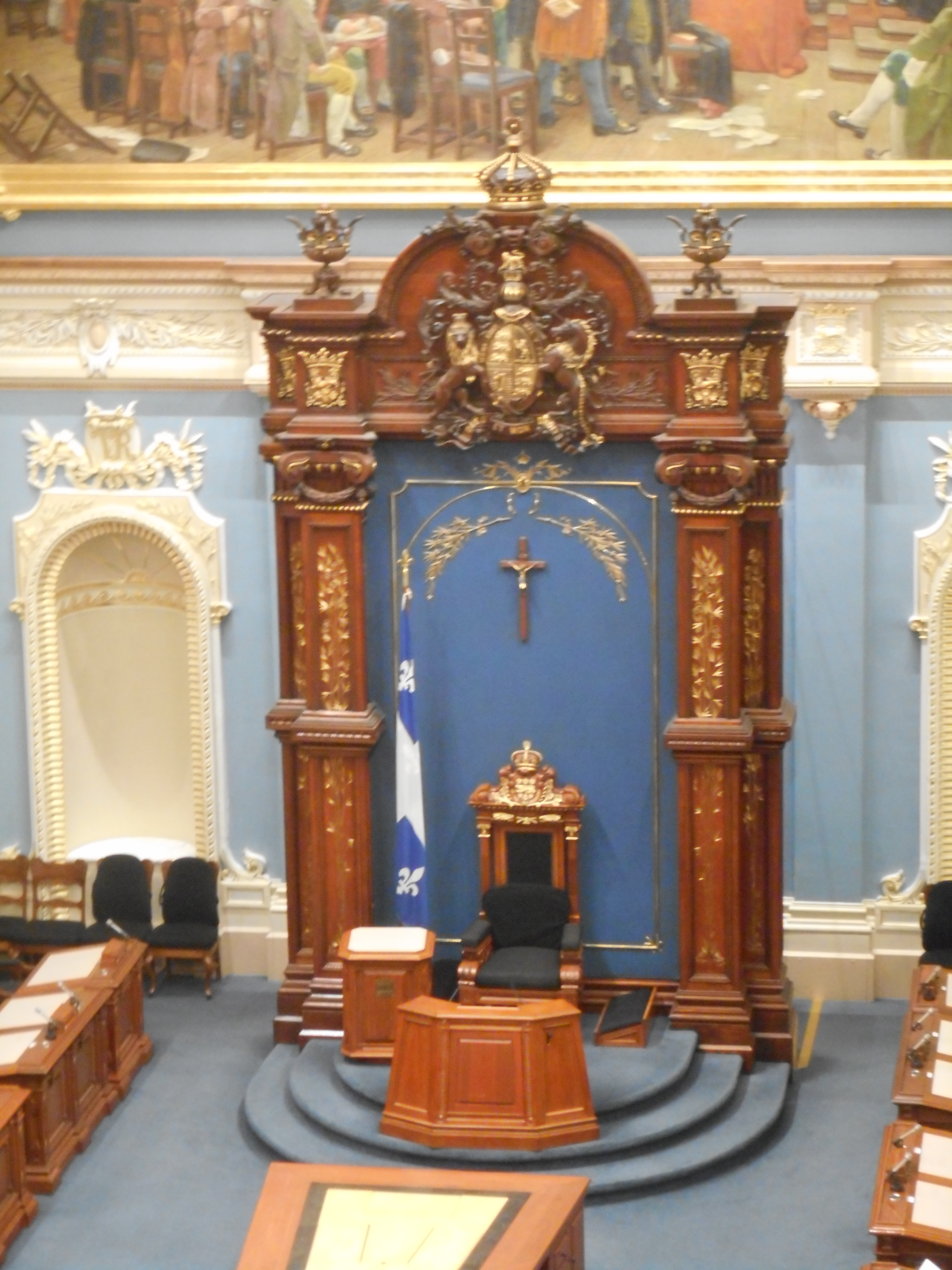
A crucifix hung above the seat of the National Assembly of Quebec from 1936 to 9 July 2019.

In 2005, a mother accused her daughter's school in Derby, England, of discriminating against Christians after the teenager was suspended for refusing to take off a crucifix necklace.

In 2008, a chapel in a prison in England replaced its crucifix and static altar with a cross and portable altar when it was renovated as a multi-faith chapel. Right-wing media reported that the crucifix had been removed "in case it offends Muslims".

In 2008 in Spain, a local judge ordered crucifixes removed from public schools to settle a decades-old dispute over whether crucifixes should be displayed in public buildings in a non-confessional state.

On 18 March 2011, the European Court of Human Rights ruled in the Lautsi v. Italy case, that the requirement in Italian law that crucifixes be displayed in classrooms of state schools does not violate the European Convention on Human Rights. Crucifixes are common in most other Italian official buildings, including courts of law.

On 24 March 2011, the Constitutional Court of Peru ruled that the presence of crucifixes in courts of law does not violate the secular nature of the state.

== Gallery ==
Evangelical-Lutheran crucifix at Vadstena Abbey Church in Vättern, Sweden

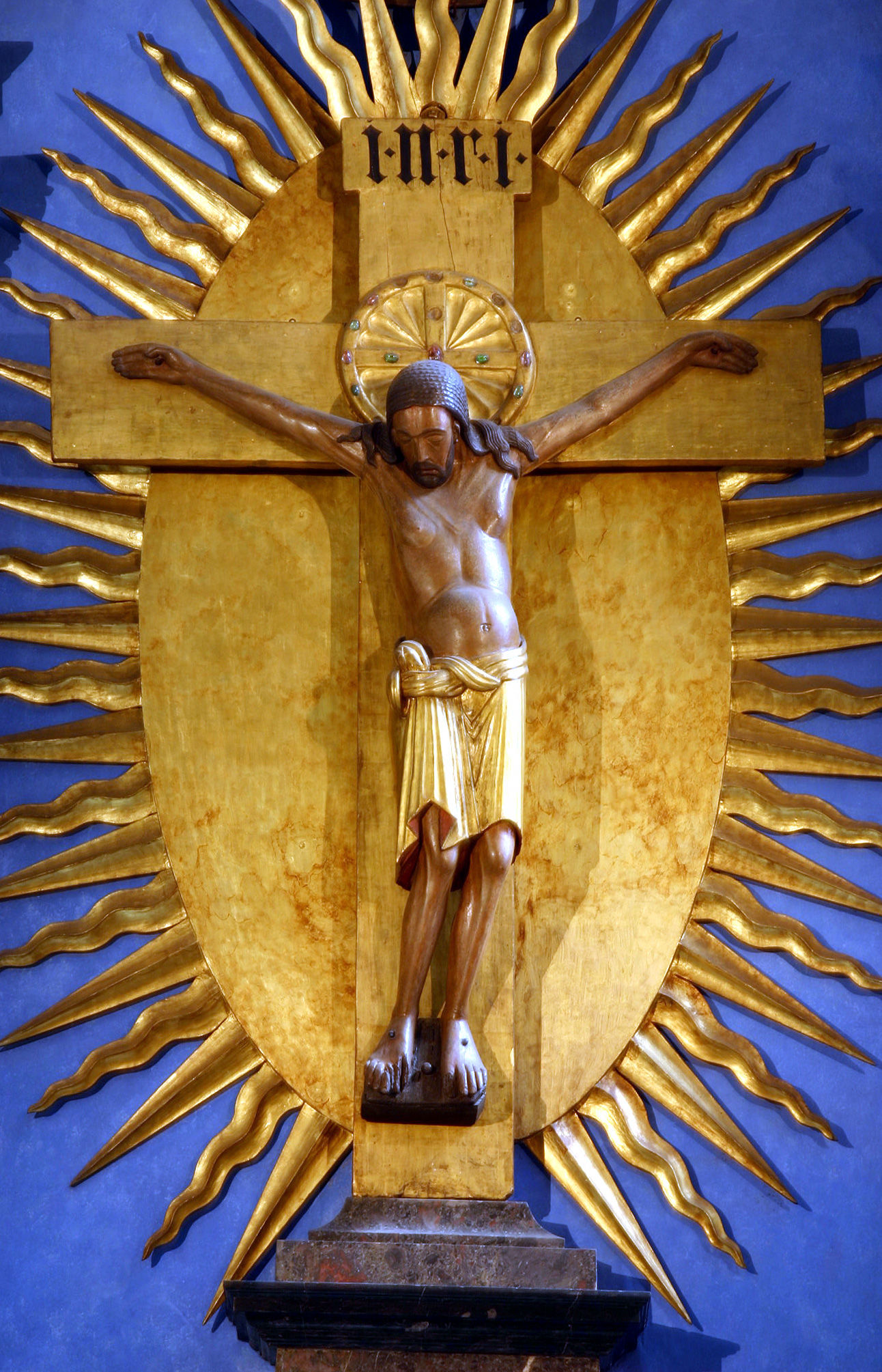
The Gero Cross.

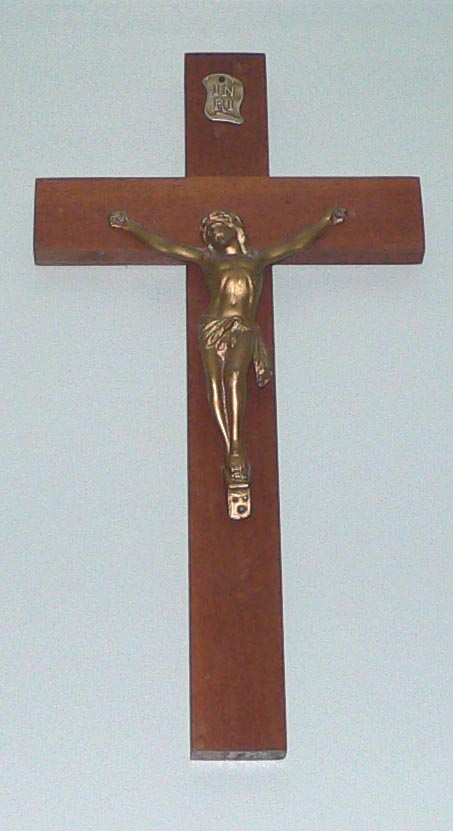
A handheld crucifix

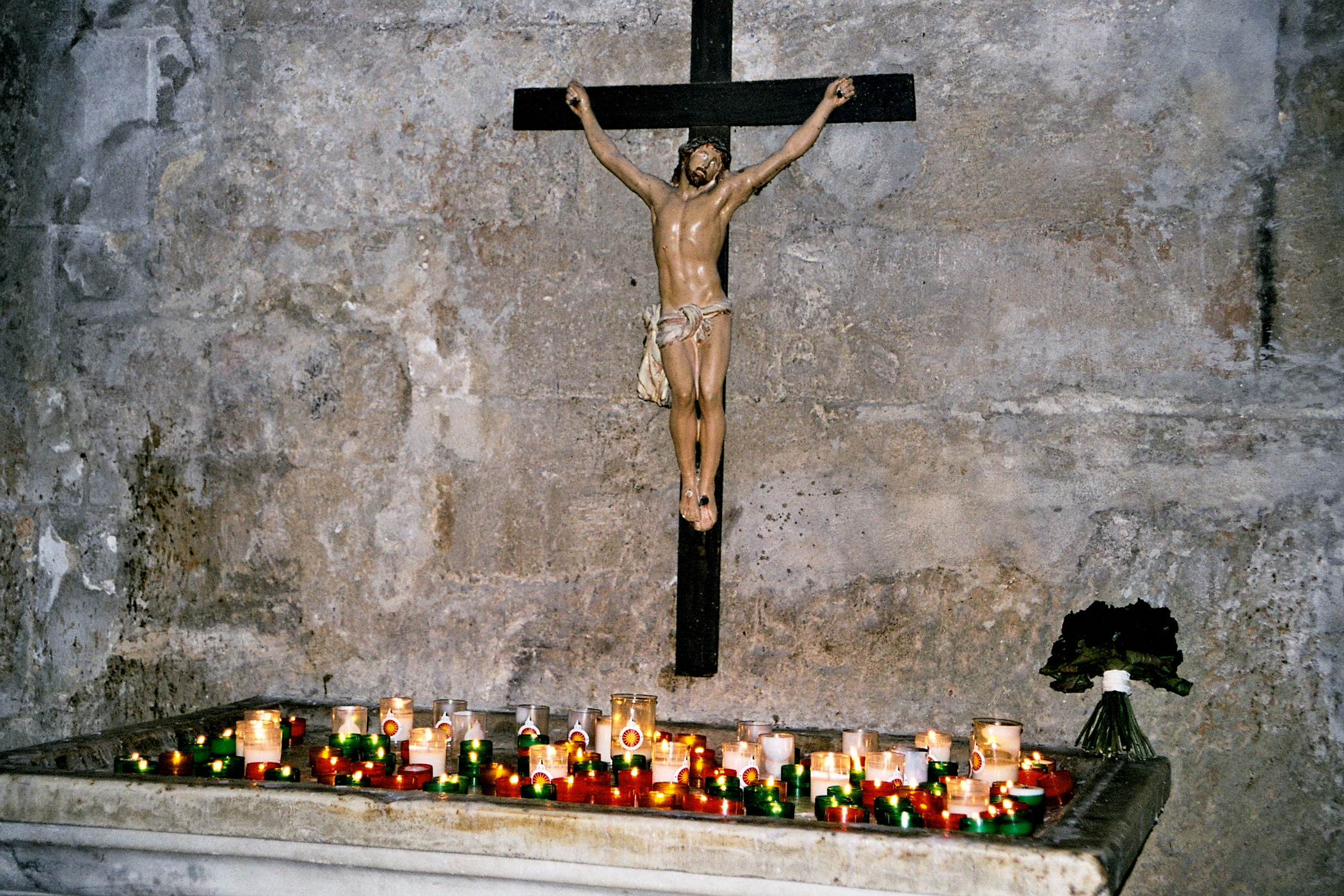
A crucifix in a church, with votive candles.

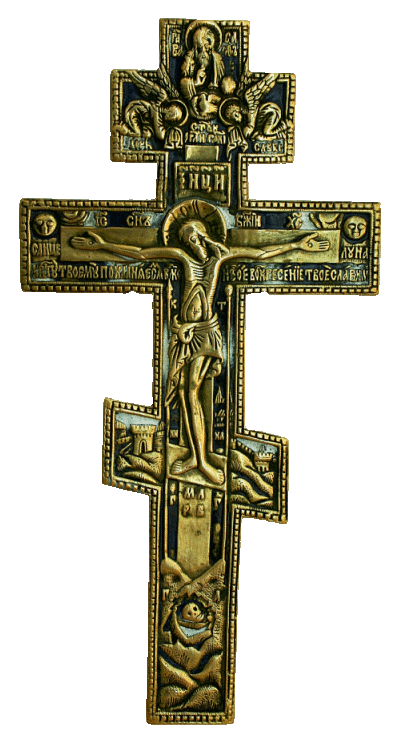
Russian Orthodox crucifix, brass

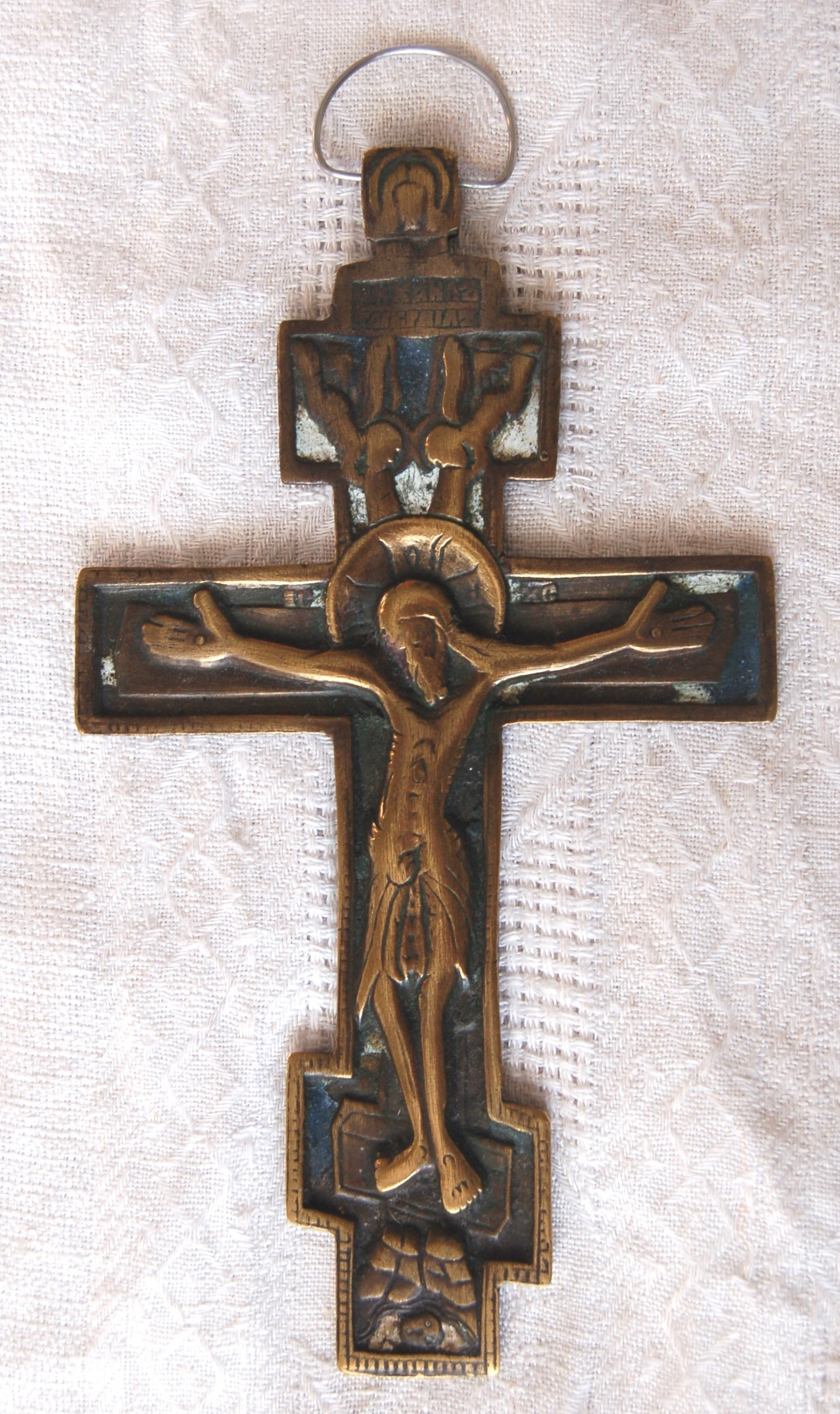
Russian Orthodox crucifix, 19th - early 20th century

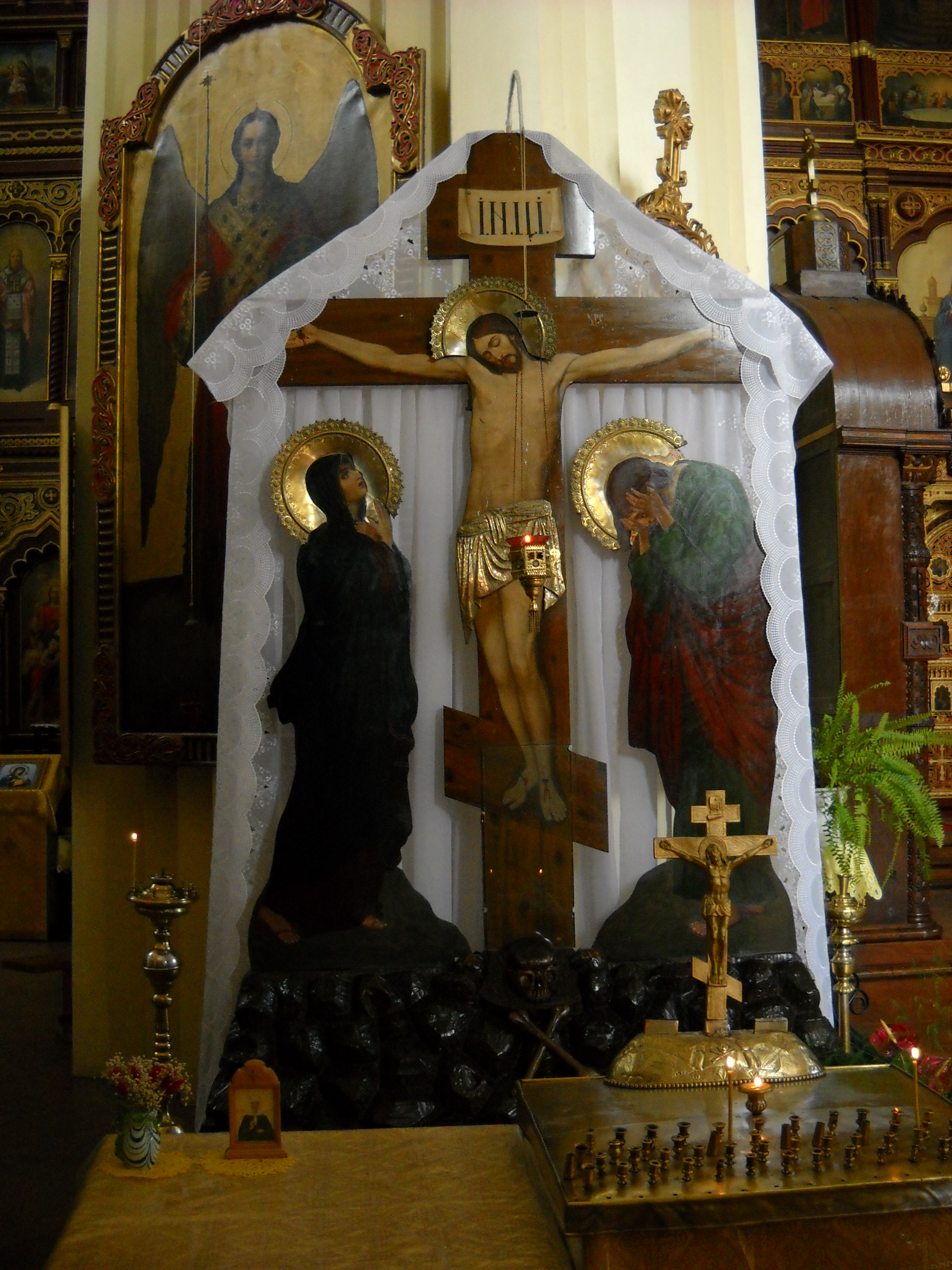
Orthodox crucifix with the Virgin Mary on the left and the Apostle John on the right in Vilnius, Lithuania

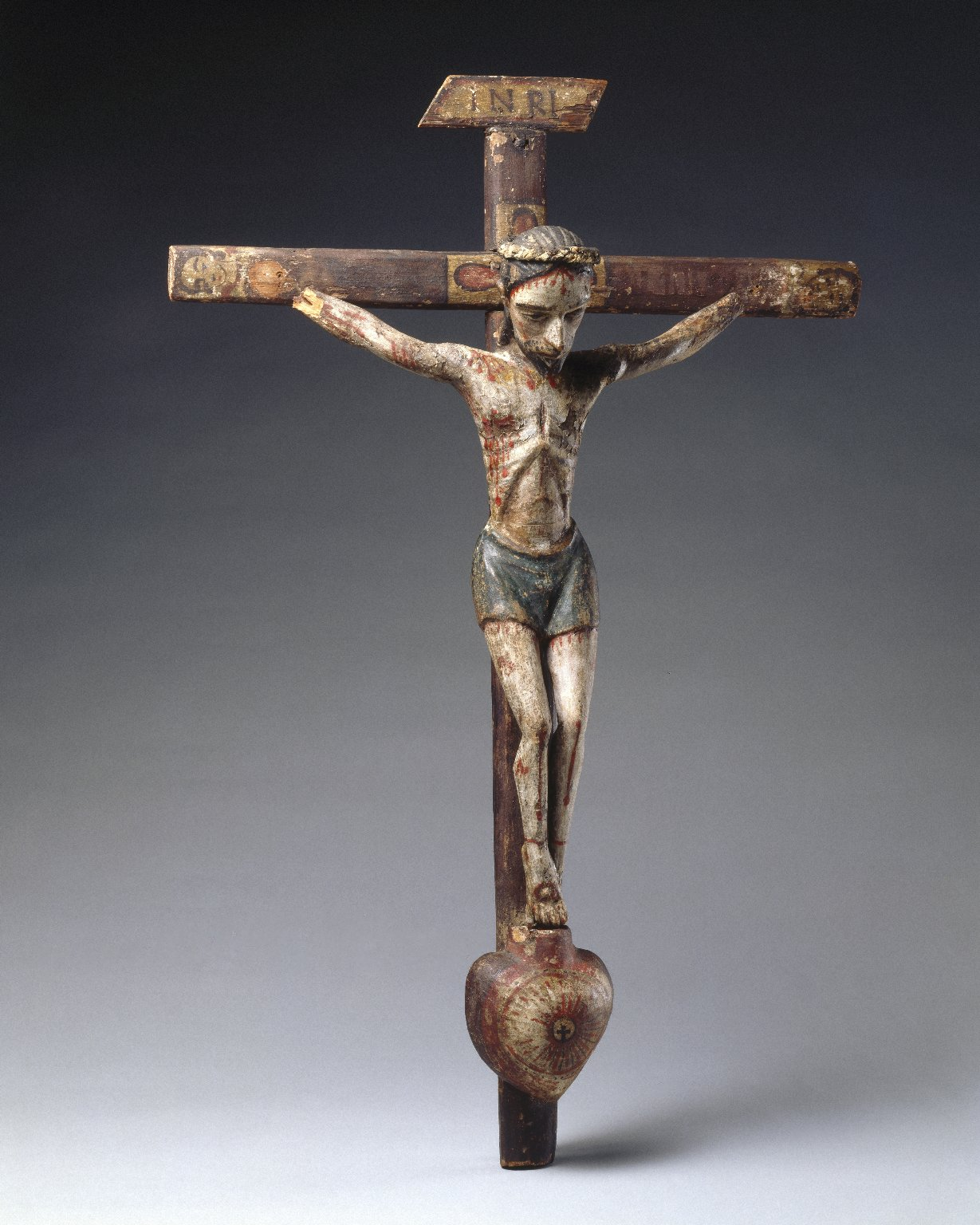
Crucifix, c. 1795–1862, Brooklyn Museum

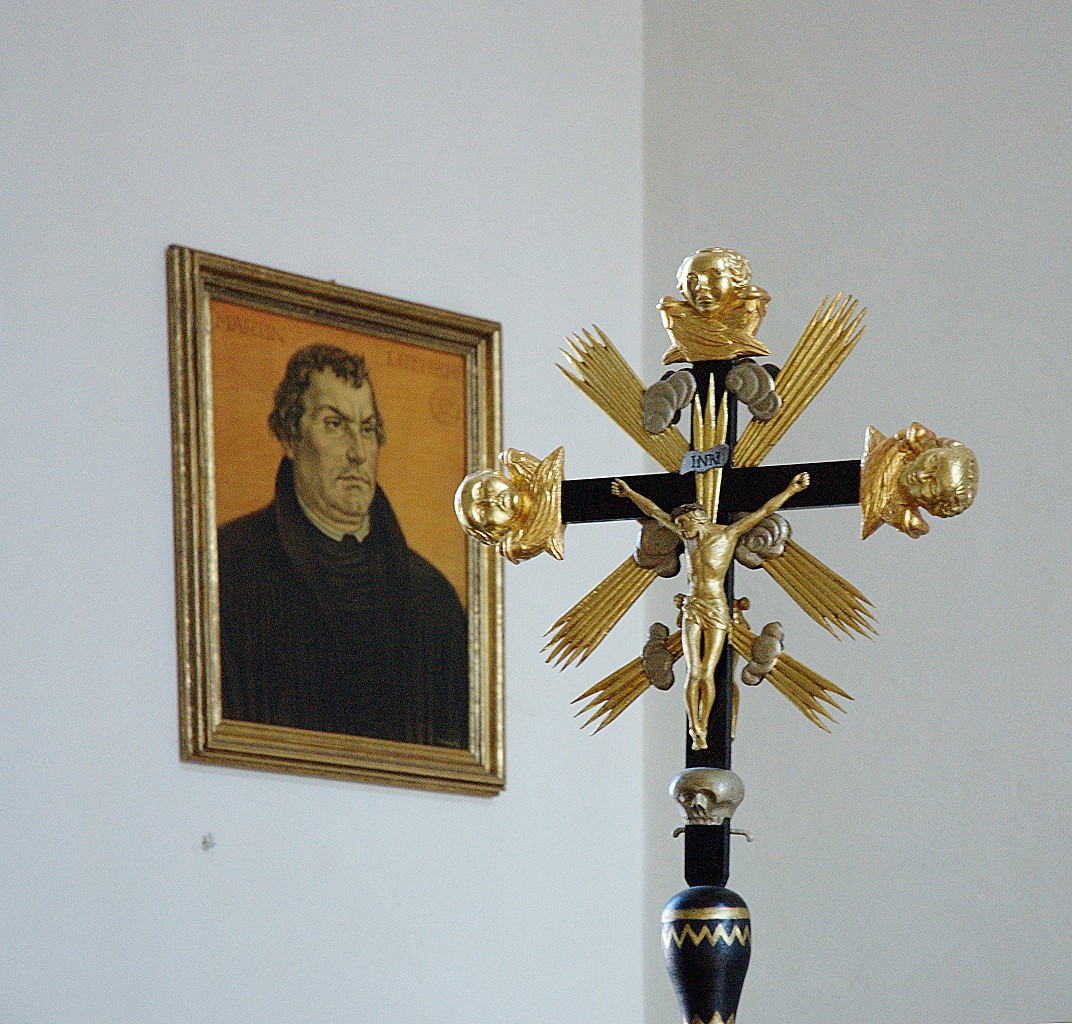
Processional crucifix with the portrait of Martin Luther at Saint George's Lutheran church in Immeldorf, Lichtenau

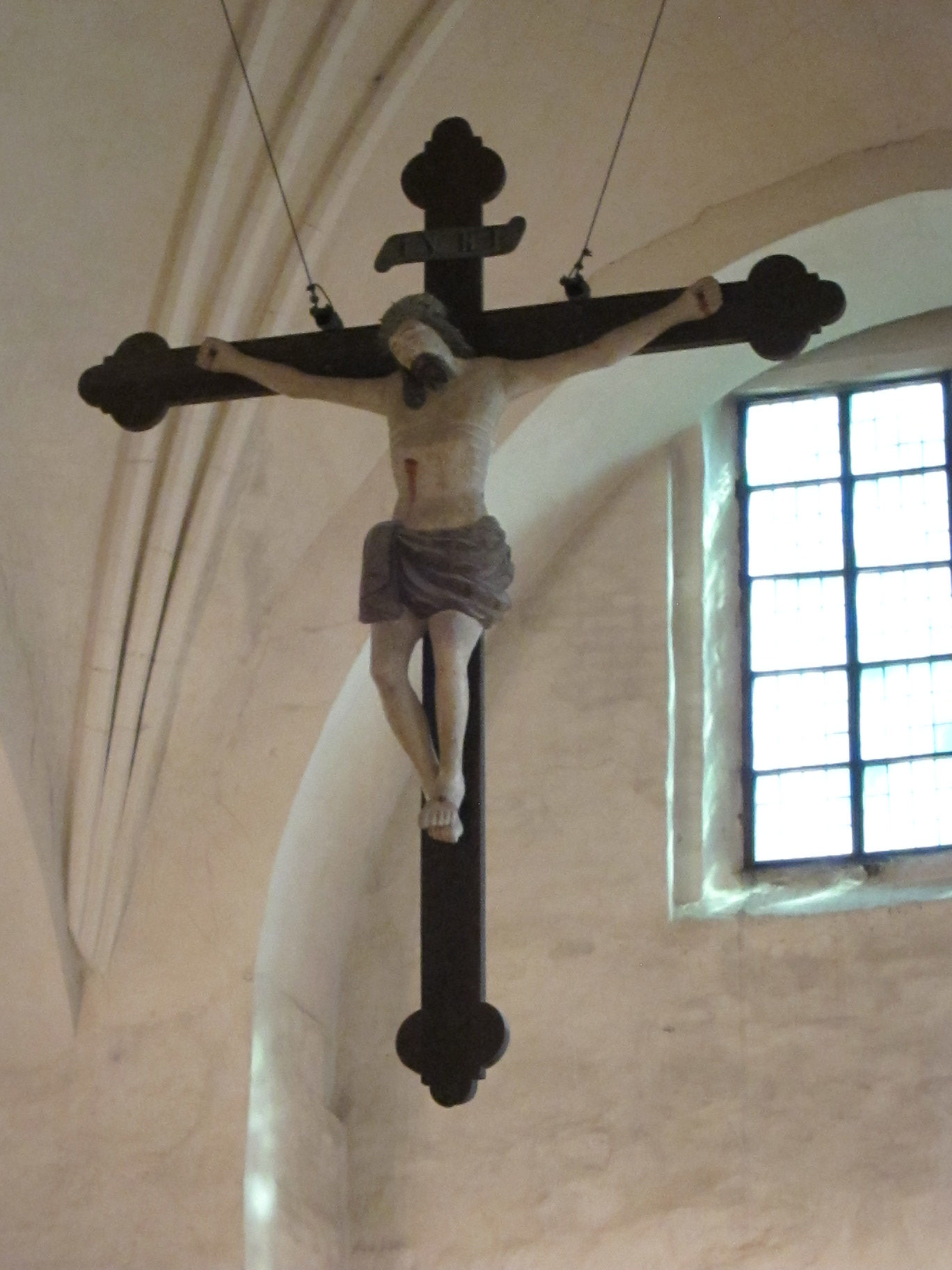
A triumph crucifix at Naantali Church in Naantali, Finland

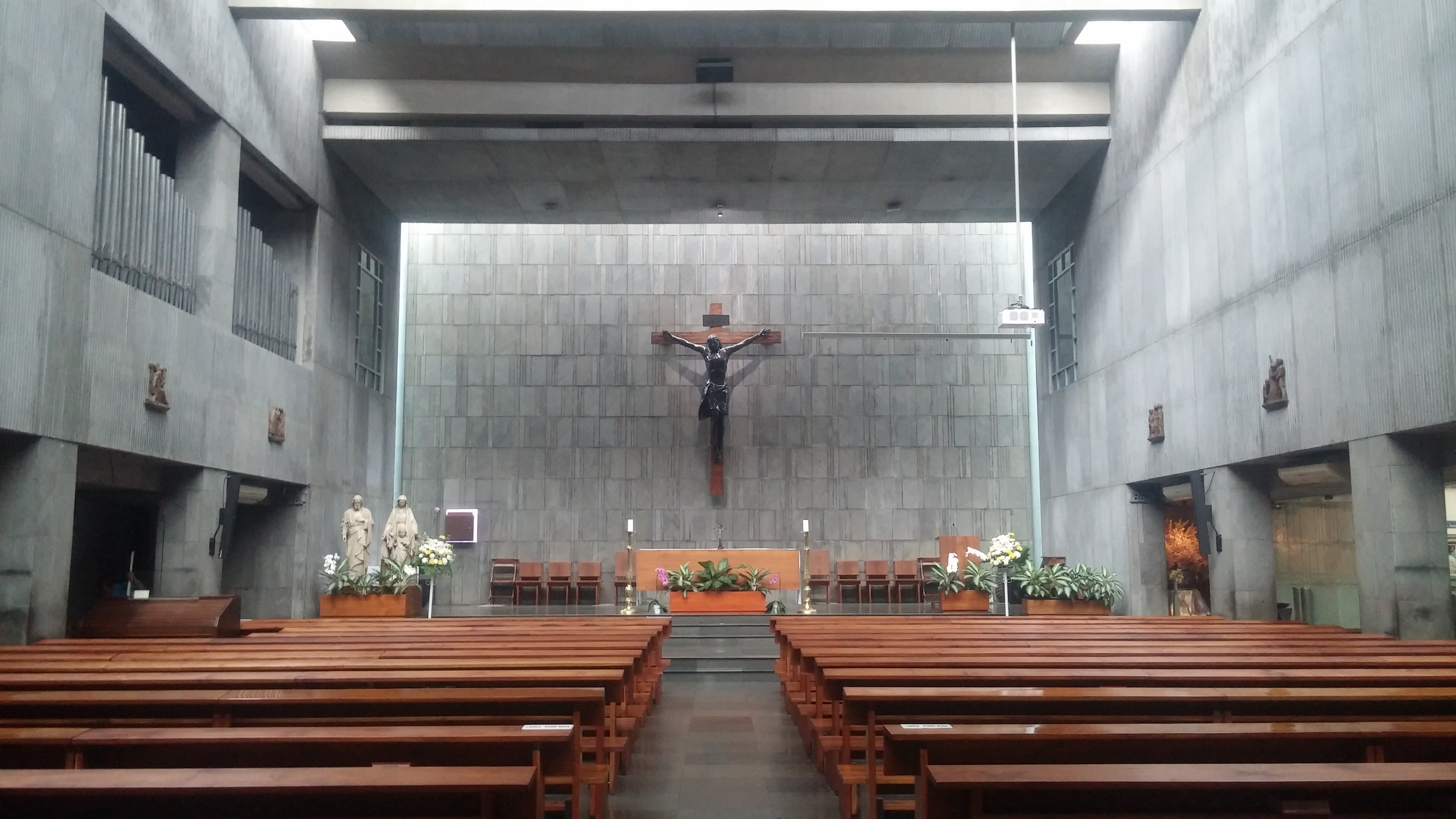
A large crucifix at Gereja Santa, Jakarta, Indonesia

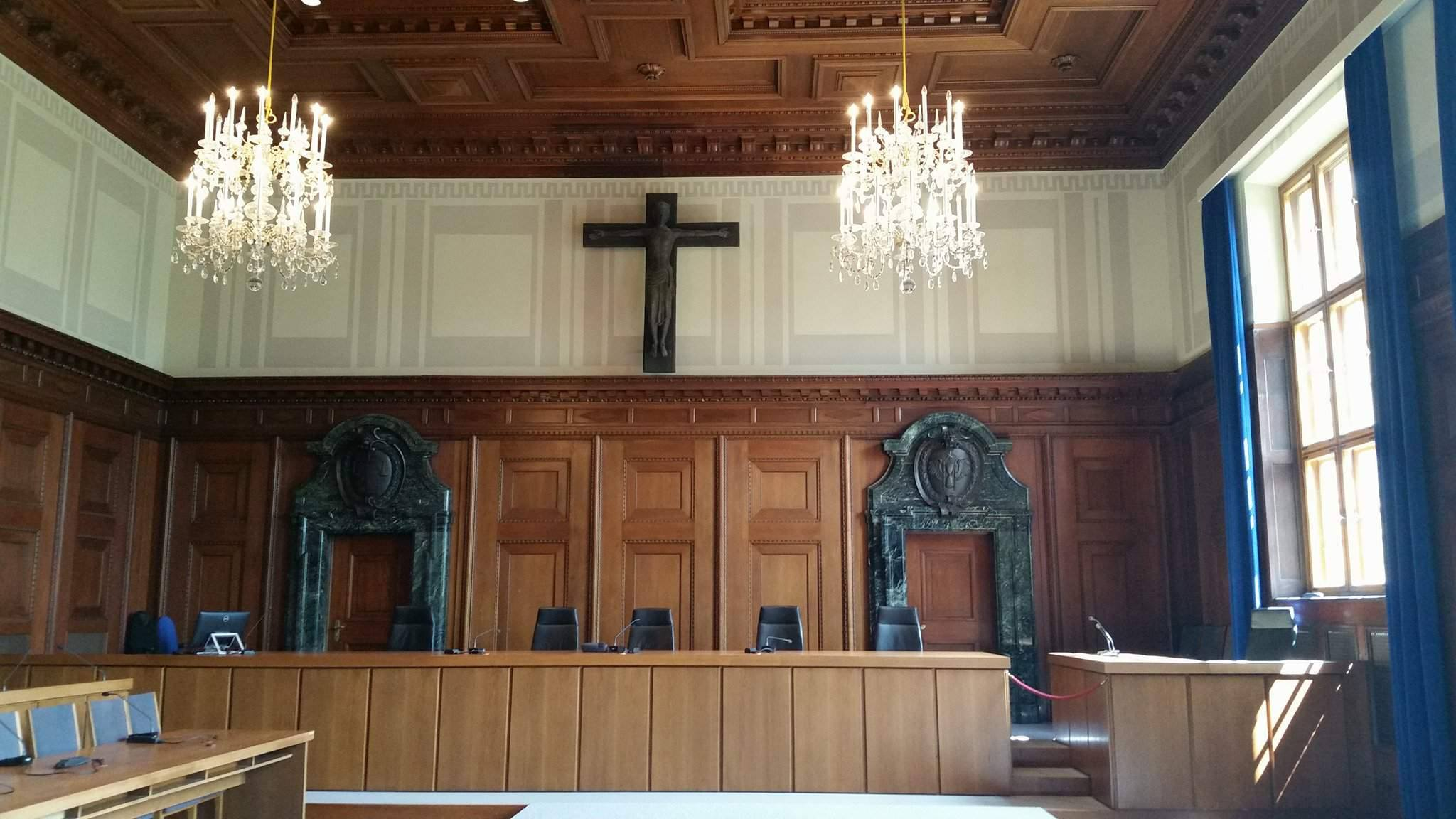
A post–World War II crucifix in a courtroom in Nuremberg, Germany

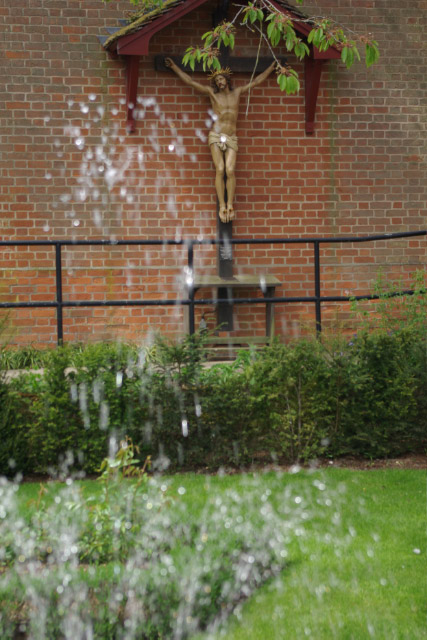
A crucifix overlooks a fountain at the Anglican Shrine of Our Lady of Walsingham

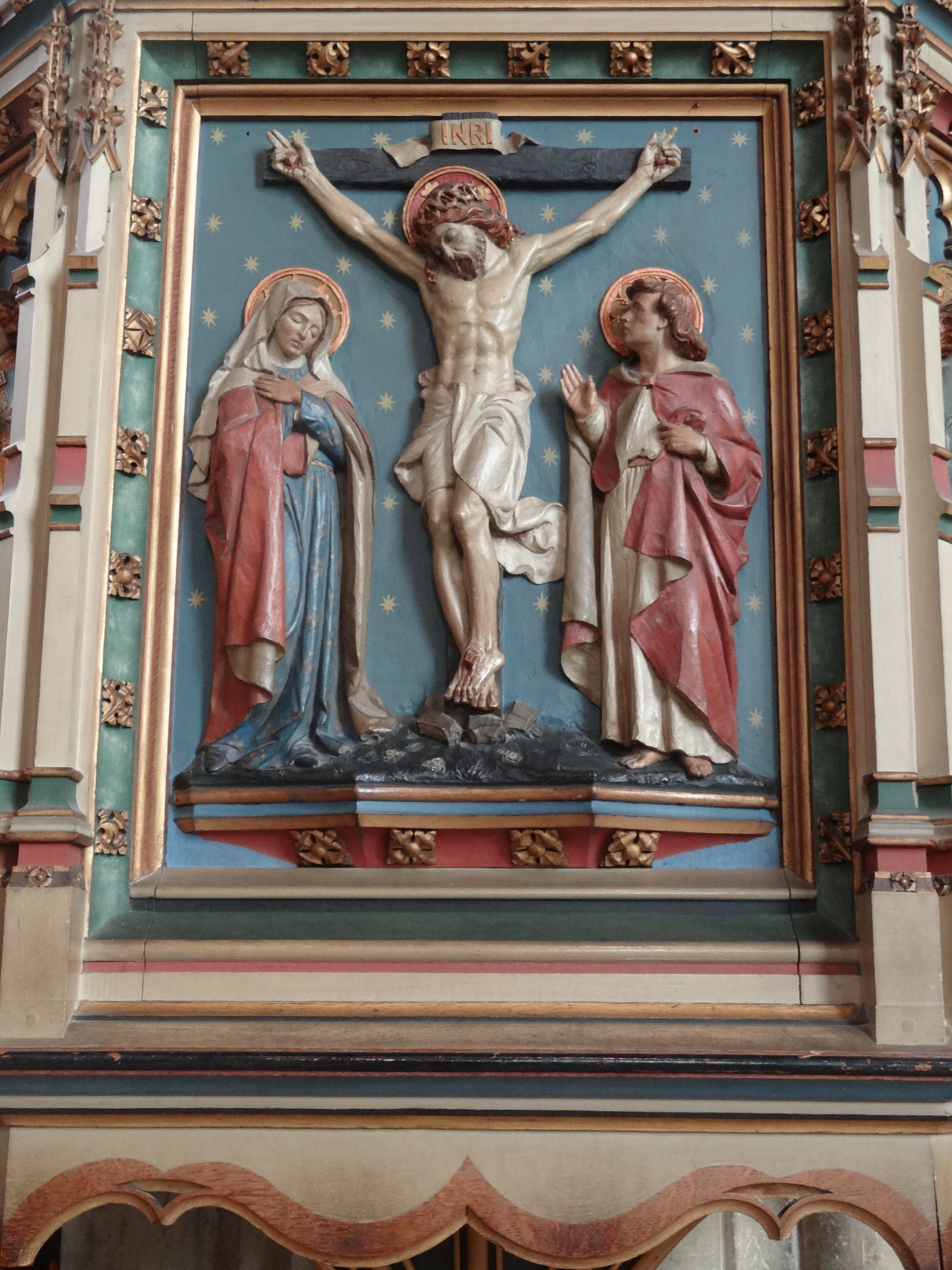
Pulpit crucifix at Canterbury Cathedral

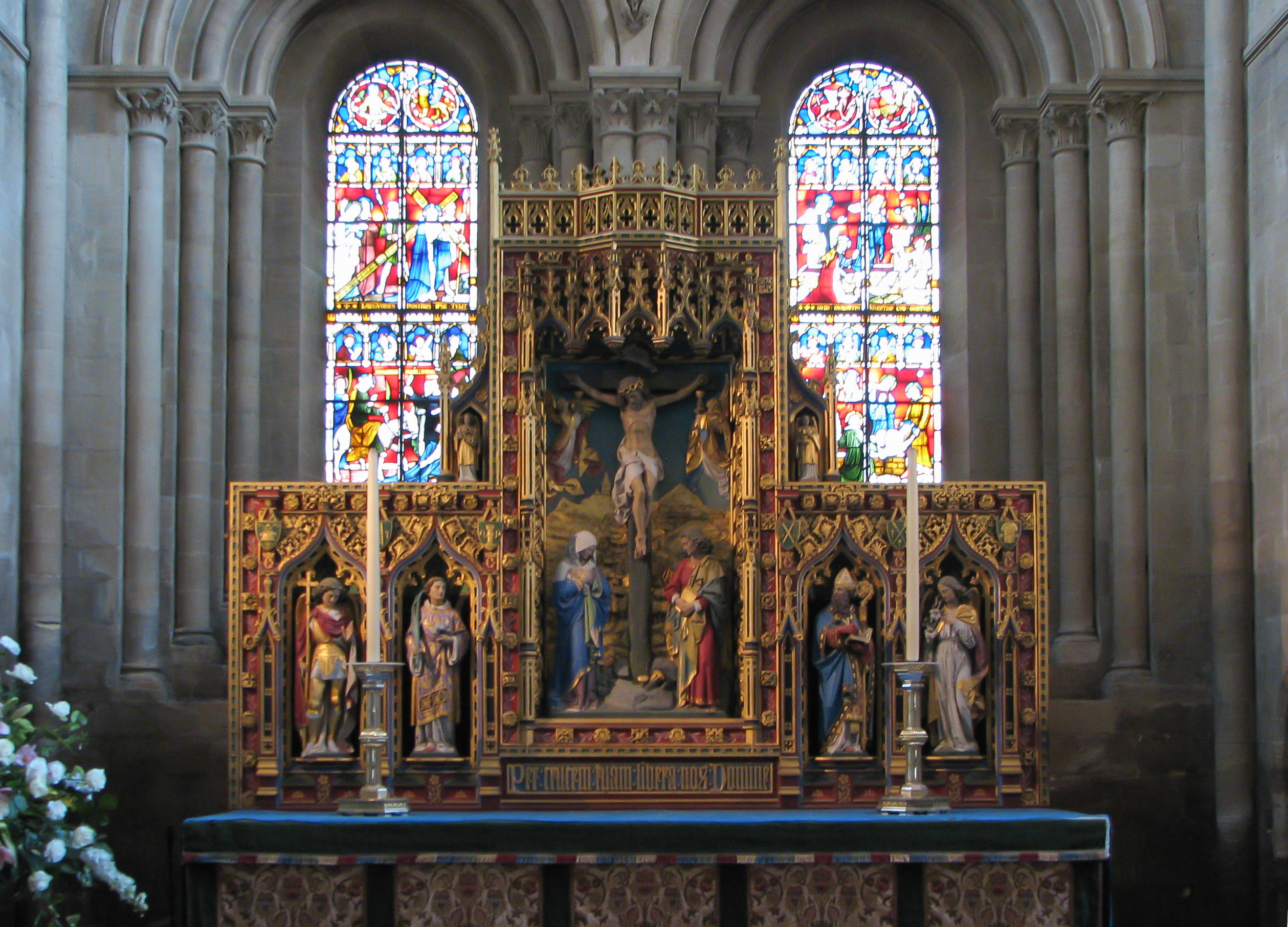
Altar of Christ Church Cathedral, Oxford

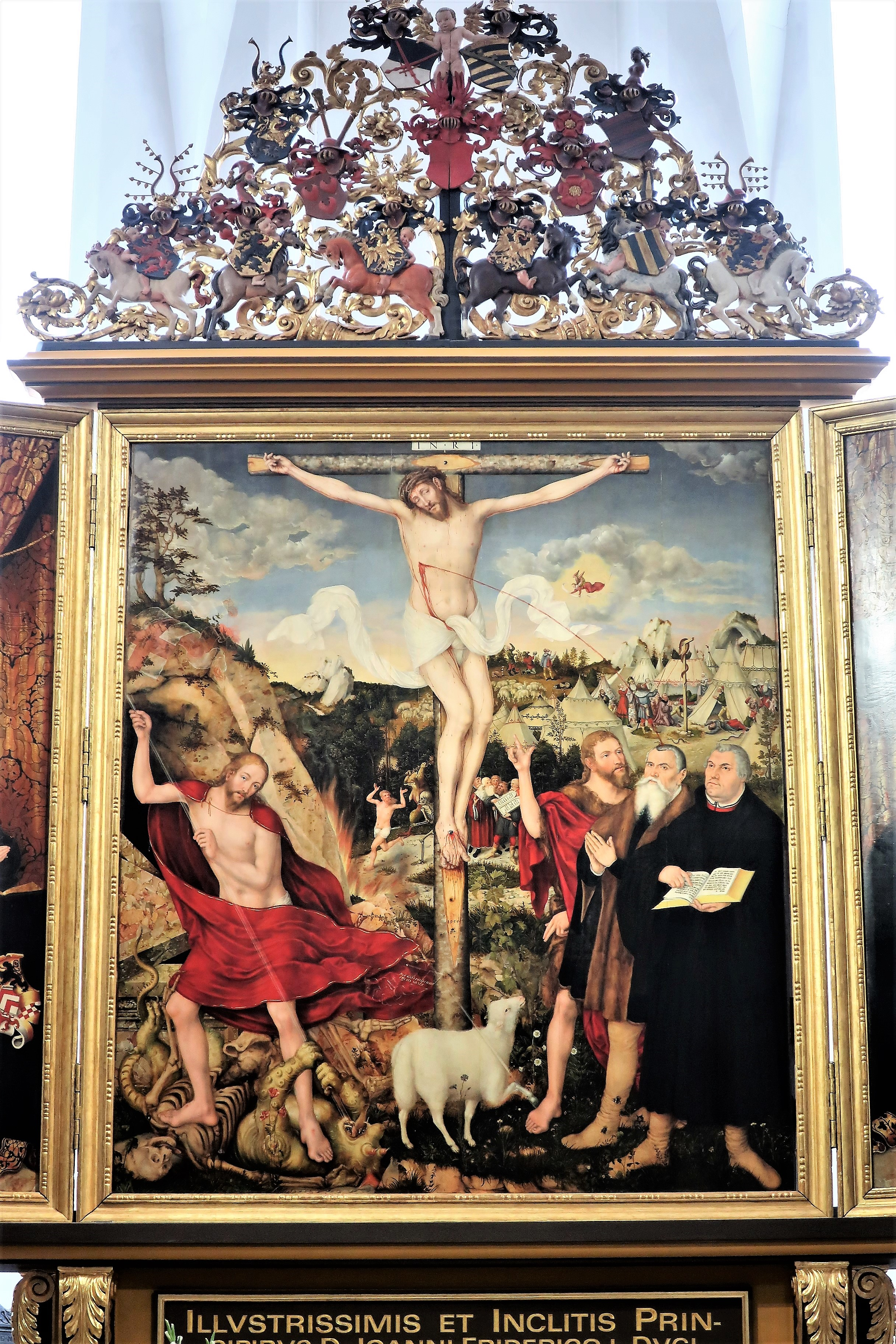
Altar panel of the Church of St. Peter and Paul in Weimar depicts the Crucifixion of Jesus with Lucas Cranach the Elder and Martin Luther standing on the right

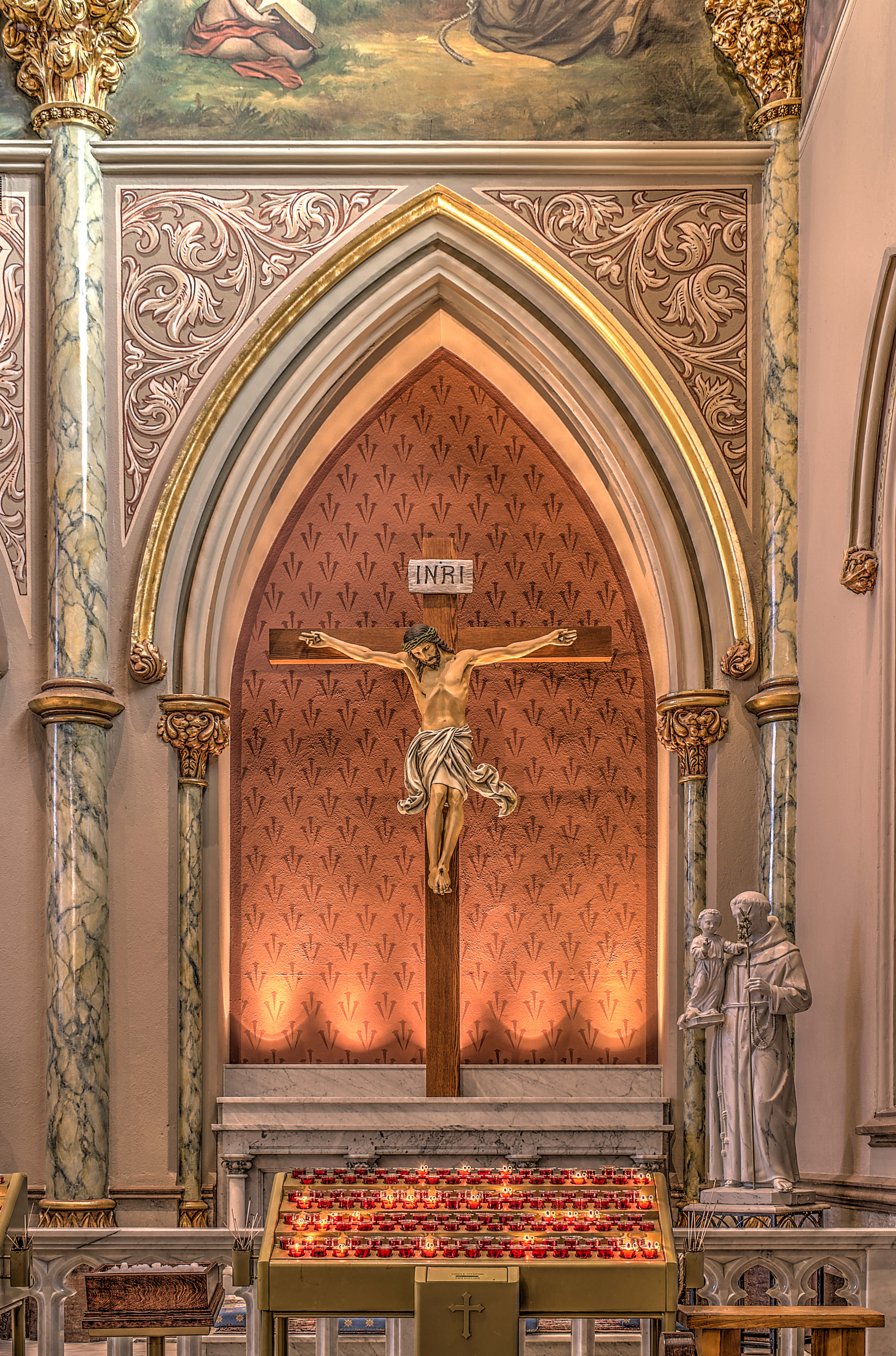
Crucifix at the Cathedral of St. John the Baptist

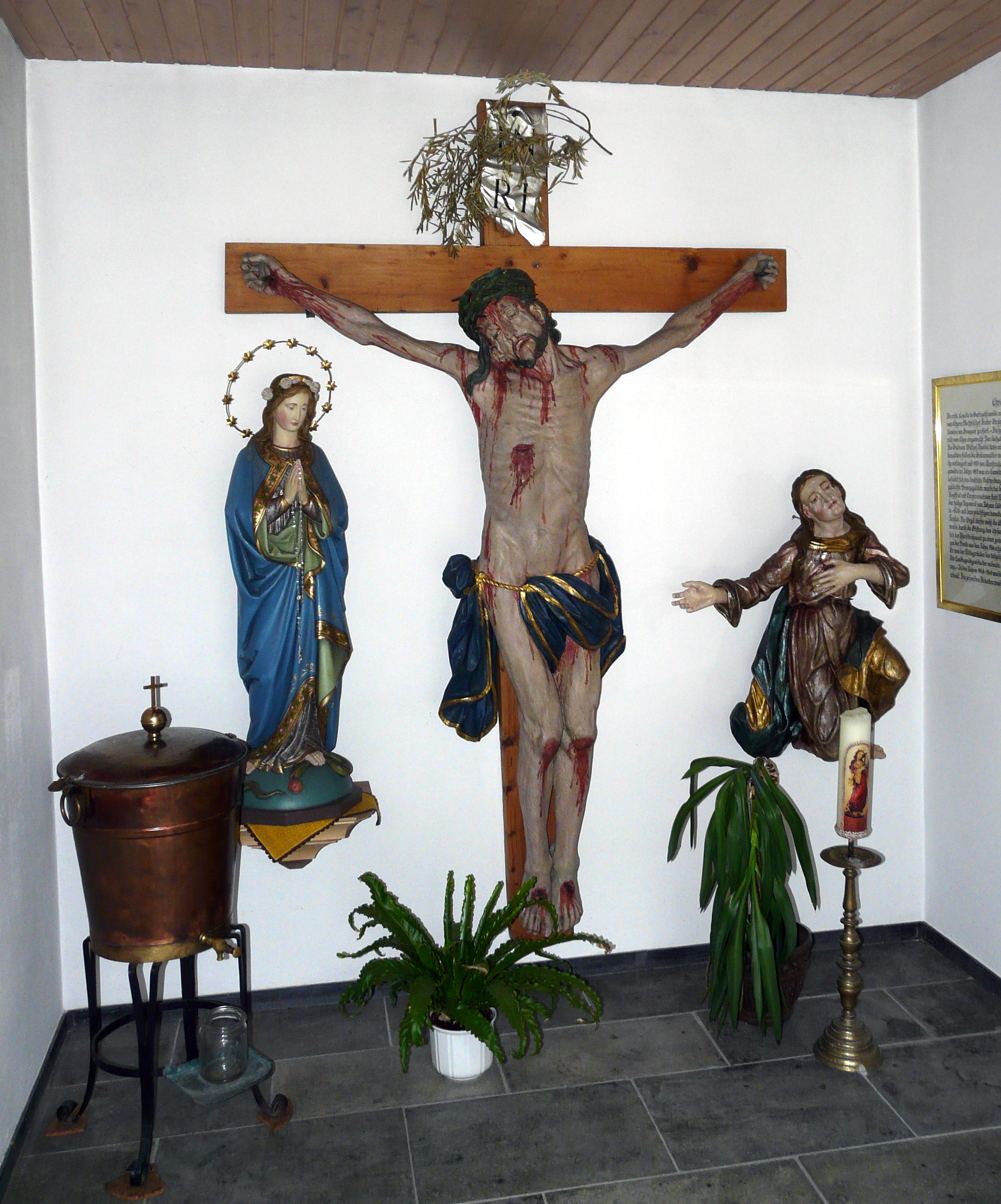
Crucifixion group at Catholic parish church of St. Nikolaus in Montafon, Austria

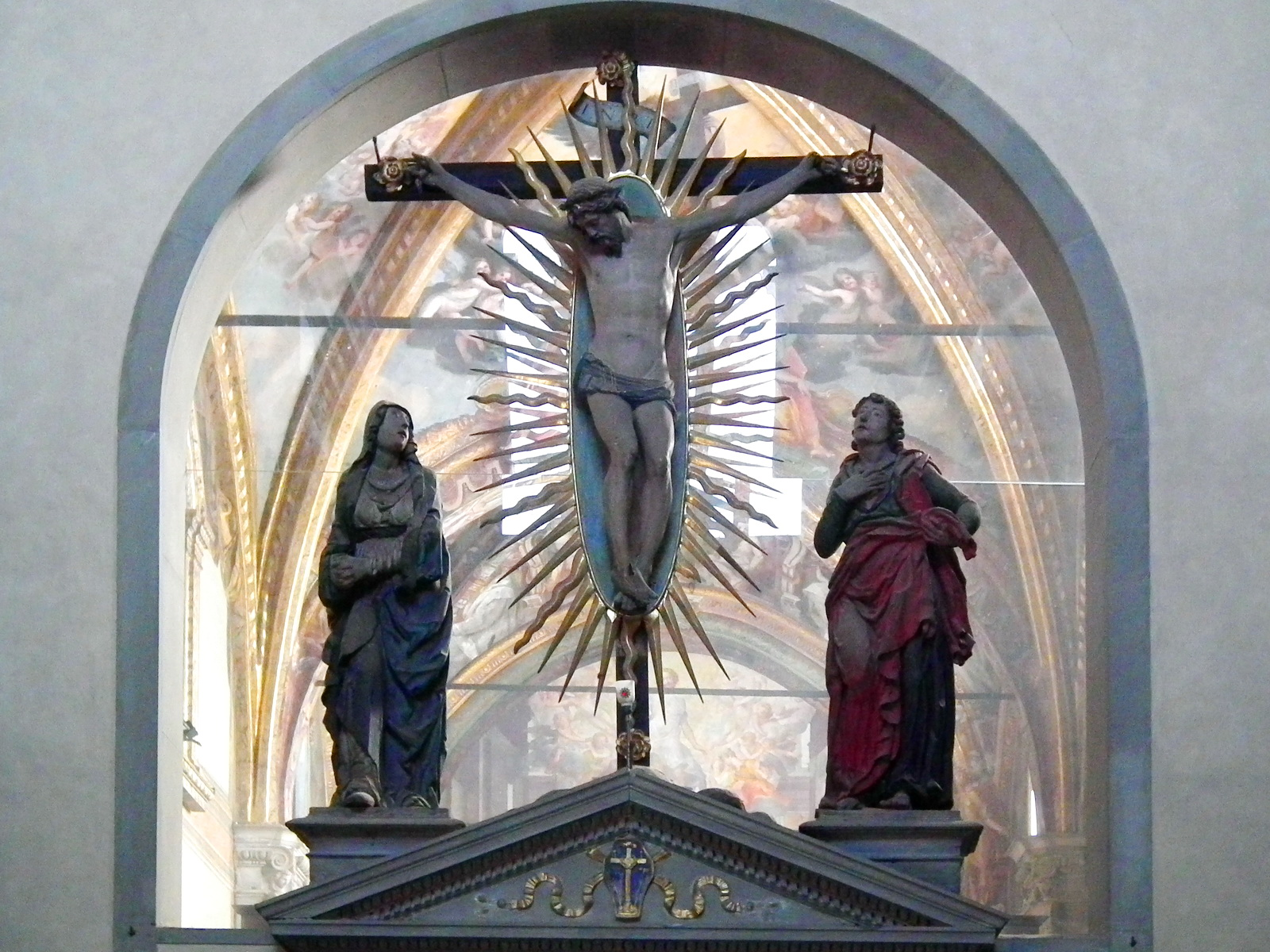
Crucifix at the Carthusian monastery in Galluzzo, Italy

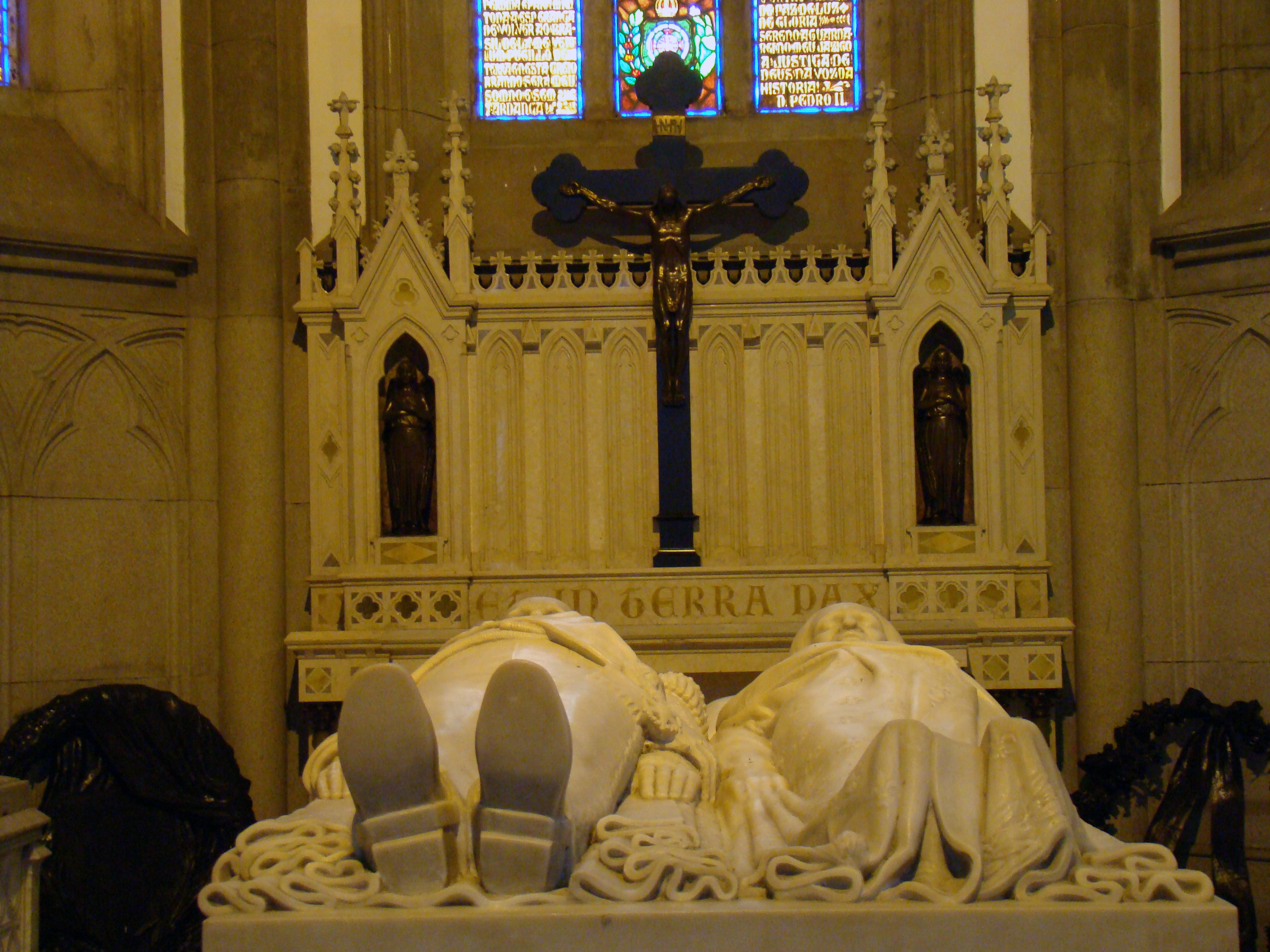
Altar crucifix featuring a cross made of black granite from the Tijuca Forest, situated behind the tomb of Emperor Pedro II of Brazil and Empress Teresa Cristina in the Cathedral of Petrópolis

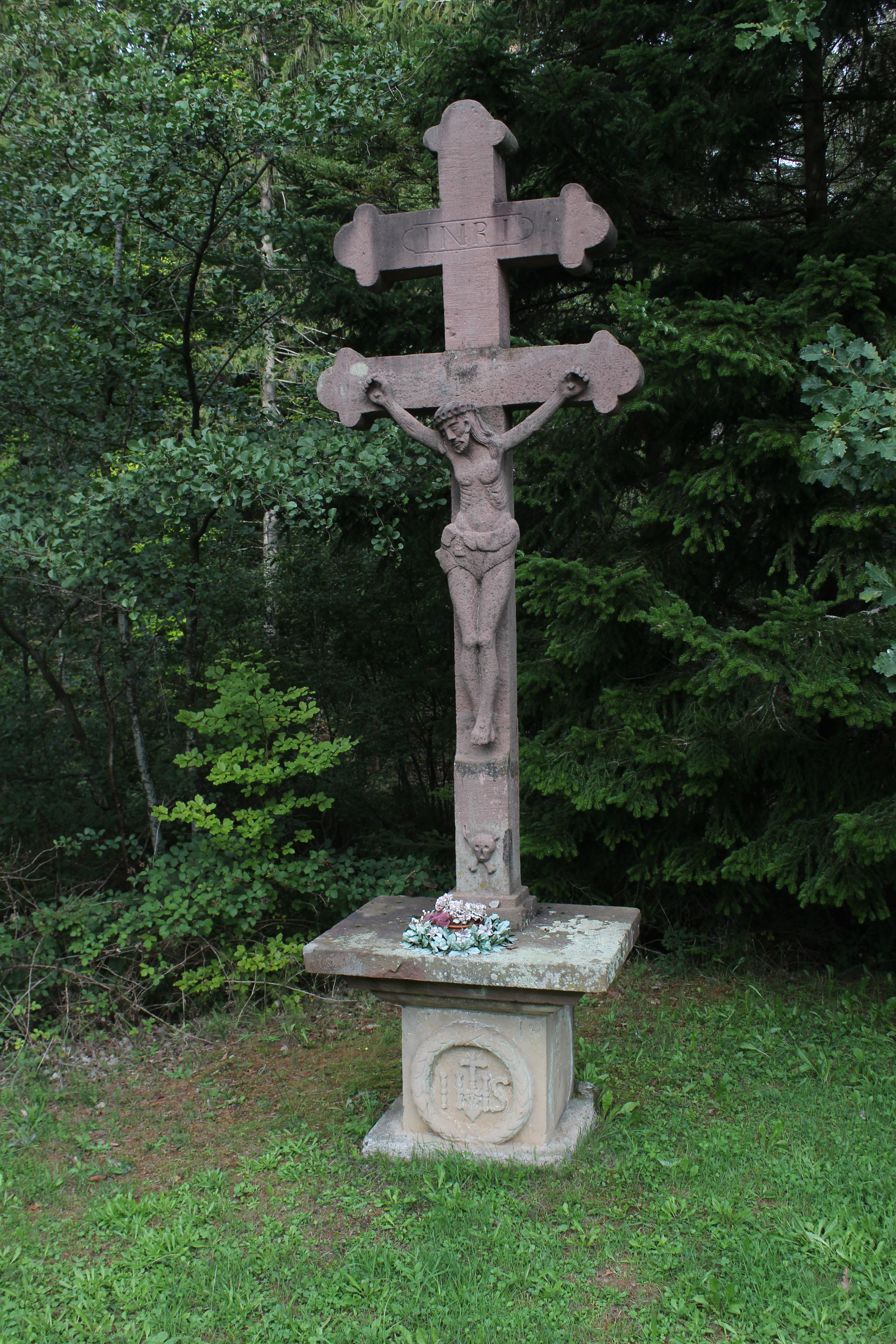
two-barred crucifix as wayside cross in Germany

== See also ==
- Cloisters Cross
- Christian cross variants
- Christian symbolism
- Cross necklace
- Crucifer
- Crucifix Decrees
- Crucifixion in the arts
- Feast of the Cross
- Holy Face of Lucca
- Jesus, King of the Jews
- Master of the Blue Crucifixes
- Papal ferula
- Rood
- Rosary
- Tripalium
