= Pisani =

Pisani may refer to:

- Pisani (surname), Italian surname
- Pisani family, a Venetian patrician family active in the Venetian Republic from the 12th to the 18th Centuries
- Rocca Pisana
- Palazzo Contarini Pisani
- Palazzo Soranzo Pisani
- Italian submarine Vettor Pisani, an Italian Pisani-class submarine serving the Regia Marina during World War II
- Joseph Pisani, American-Swiss contemporary artist

== See also ==
- Pisano (disambiguation)
- Villa Pisani (disambiguation)
