= Master of the Blue Crucifixes =

Italian painter

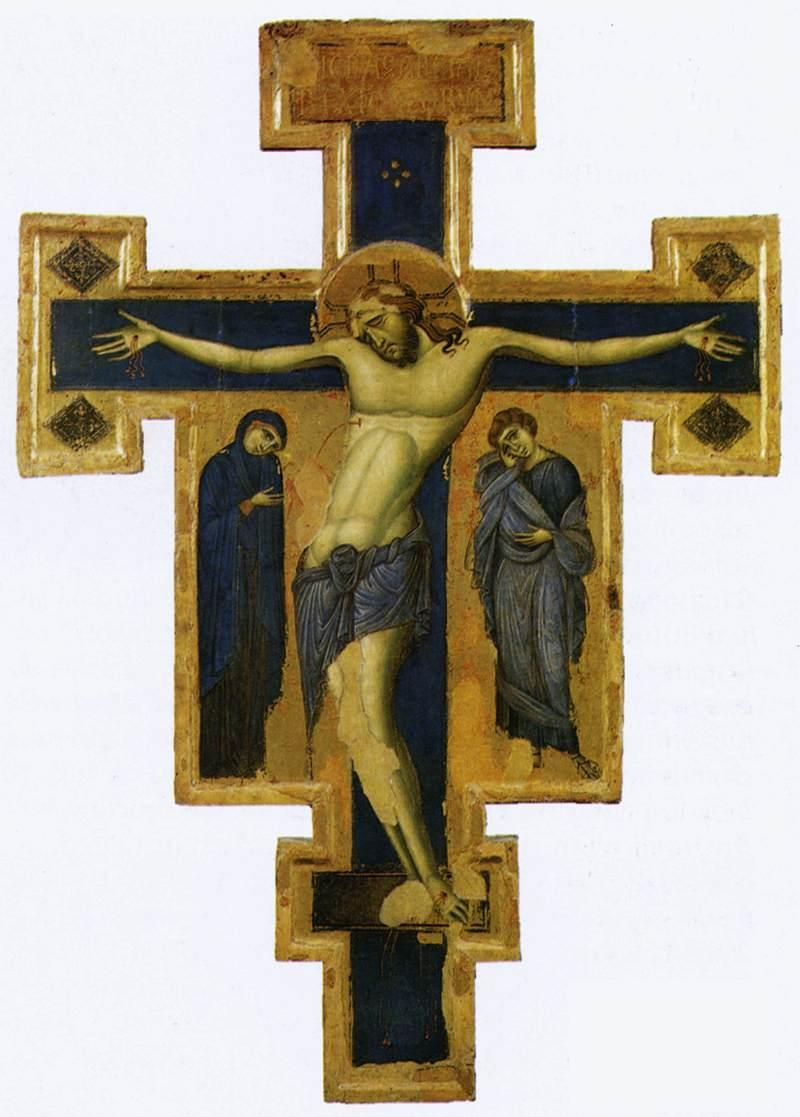
Double-sided Crucifix (13th century), tempera on panel, 109.5 x 77 cm.

The Master of the Blue Crucifixes was an Italian artist active either in the region of Umbria or Emilia during the middle of the thirteenth century. He is associated with the Basilica of San Francesco d'Assisi, and may have been an assistant of Giunta Pisano, whose work his paintings resemble. A number of his works survive, mainly processional crucifixes from which, along with his favoring of blue paint as a background, his name is derived.
