= Pisanu =

Pisanu is an Italian surname. Notable people with the surname include:

- Andrea Pisanu (born 1982), Italian footballer and coach
- Giuseppe Pisanu (born 1937), Italian politician

== See also ==
- Pisano (disambiguation)
