= Master of the Treasury =

Italian painter

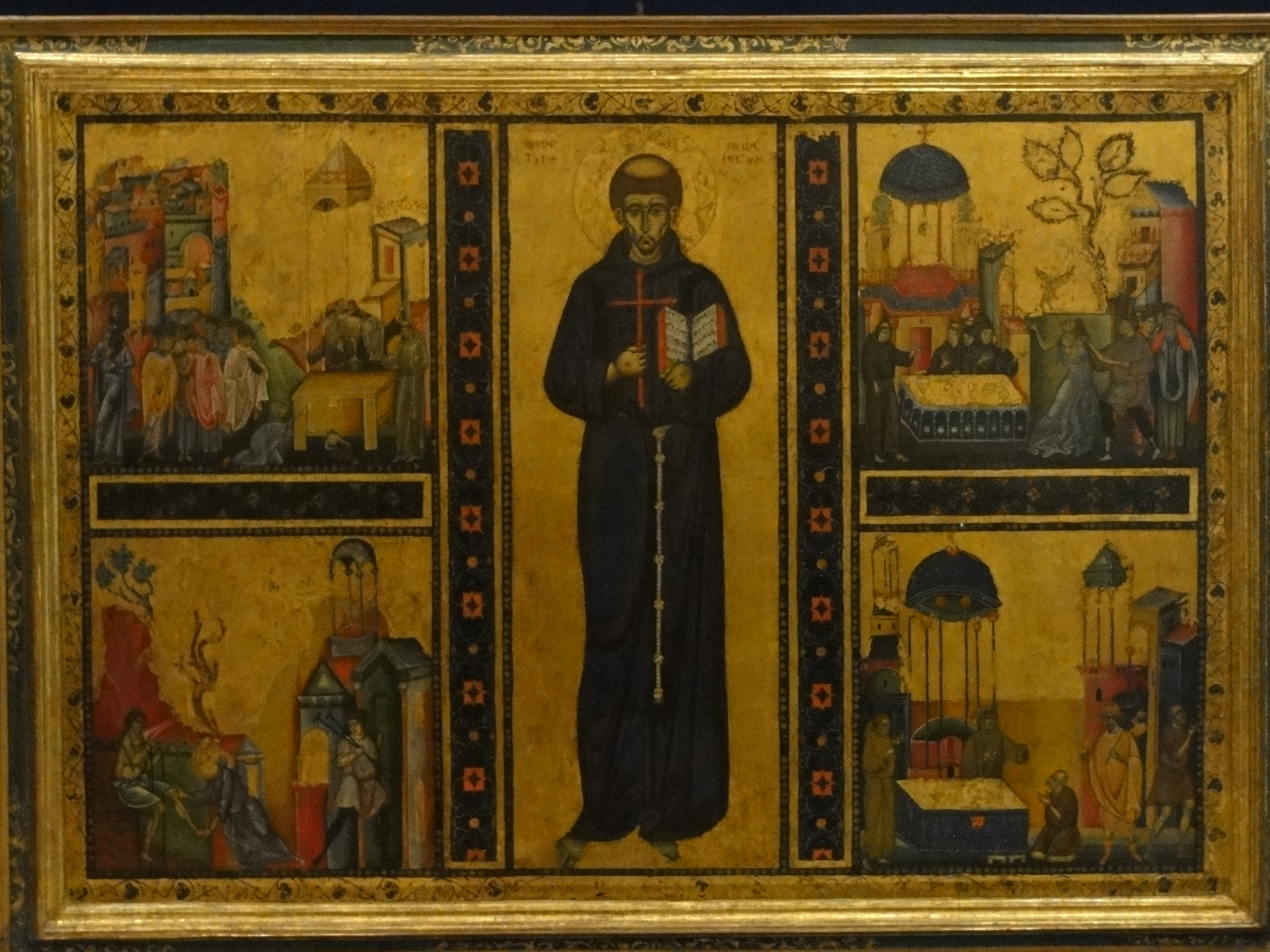
St Francis and four of his miracles (second third of the 13th century) Treasure Museum of the Basilica of St Francis

The Master of the Treasury was an Italian painter working in the Italo-Byzantine style during the middle of the thirteenth century. A follower of Giunta Pisano, he is known from a painting in the treasury of the Basilica of San Francesco d'Assisi representing the titular saint and four of his posthumous miracles.
