= Villa Pisani =

Villa Pisani may refer to:

- Villa Pisani, Bagnolo, Andrea Palladio's patrician villa in Bagnolo, Veneto, Italy
- Villa Pisani, Montagnana, Andrea Palladio's patrician villa in Montagnana, Veneto, Italy
- Villa Pisani, Stra, monumental, late-Baroque rural palace along the Brenta Canal in Stra, Veneto, Italy
- Villa Pisani, patrician villa in Lonigo, Veneto, Italy

== See also ==
- Pisani (disambiguation)
