= Pisano =

Pisano may refer to:

- Pisano, a native or inhabitant of Pisa, Italy
- Pisano (surname), a list of people
- Pisano, Piedmont, commune in the province of Novara, in northern Italy
- Pisano period, in number theory
- Pisanello (1380–1456), Italian artist sometimes erroneously called Vittore Pisano

== See also ==
- Pisa (disambiguation)
- Pisana (disambiguation)
- Pisani (disambiguation)
- Pisanu, a surname
