= Tripalium =

Latin term believed to name a torture instrument consisting of "three stakes"

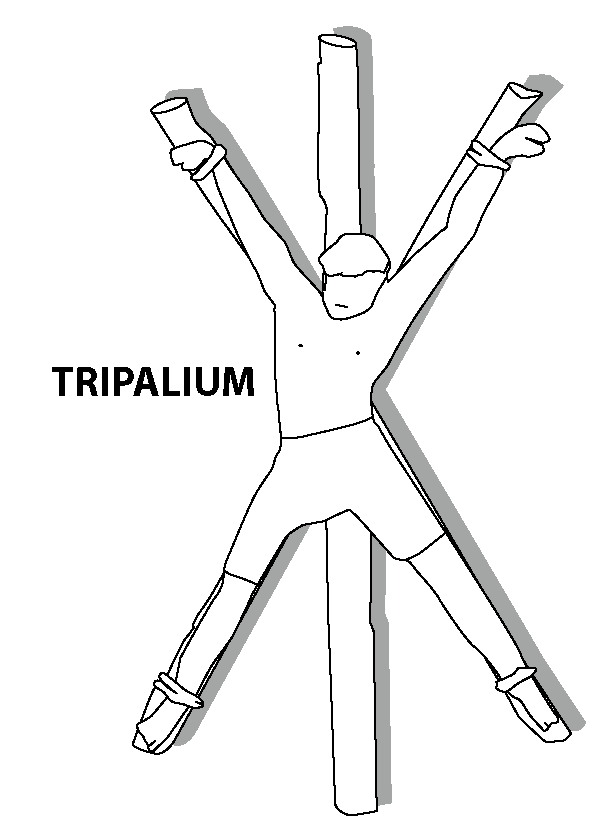
Possible appearance of a Tripalium

Tripalium or trepalium (derived from the Latin roots, "tri- / tres" and "pālus" – literally, "three stakes") is a Latin term believed to name a torture instrument consisting of "three stakes" (based on its literal meaning), and commonly thought to be the source for several common modern words.

== Historical background ==
The original usage of tripalium is still unclear. Its meaning is mainly inferred from interpretations of "three stakes". The earliest references from the ancient Roman era use the term to describe a wooden structure designed to securely immobilize a large "fiery animal" (horse, oxen, cow) during examination or care. In addition to livestock animals, violent men and women who were thought to behave like a fiery bull had their arms and legs tied down to a tripalium. In a 582 CE text, the Council of Auxerre, tripalium is used in the context of forbidding clerics to assist torture sessions, and is described as an instrument involving three stakes used to punish only slaves. The subject would be tied to the tripalium and tortured (e.g., burnt).

Historical records concerning the torture in the ancient Roman empire give many famous cases where it was applied and discussions of its legality, but they rarely indicate the means of torture and do not make references to impalement.

The transition from tripalium to the French technical word travail occurred in the 13th century. Travail is still used in France to describe a wooden structure used by farriers for horse care. With the evolution of the French language, Tripalium could have potentially diverged into the following variants: "traveil"; "traval"; or "traveaul". Furthermore, in the Middle Ages, tripalium described either a structure consisting of a framework of wooden beams called Trabicula, or an individual beam in the structure. These trabeculae are the direct source of architecture unique to the city of Lyon, called the Traboules – transverse structures for accessing apartments.

== Modern words derived from tripalium ==
A table of words closely related to triapalium
Word	Language(s)
travail	French and English.
trabajo	Spanish
travaglio	Italian
trabalho	Portuguese
trabalh	Occitan
tribalh	Gascon
traballo	Galician
treball	Catalan
trivalliu	Logudorese Sardinian
travagghiu	Sicilian
traballu	Campidanese Sardinian
travel	English

With the exception of the English word and the Italian word, all of the words in the table above mean "work". A majority of scholars believe these words to be reflexes of Latin "tripalium". However, this theory has been contested by a small minority, who argue that an irregularity in the development of the first syllable, which is consistent across all reflexes, points to a different etymological origin.

== See also ==
- Forked cross
- Crucifix
