= Giovanni Battista Pisani =

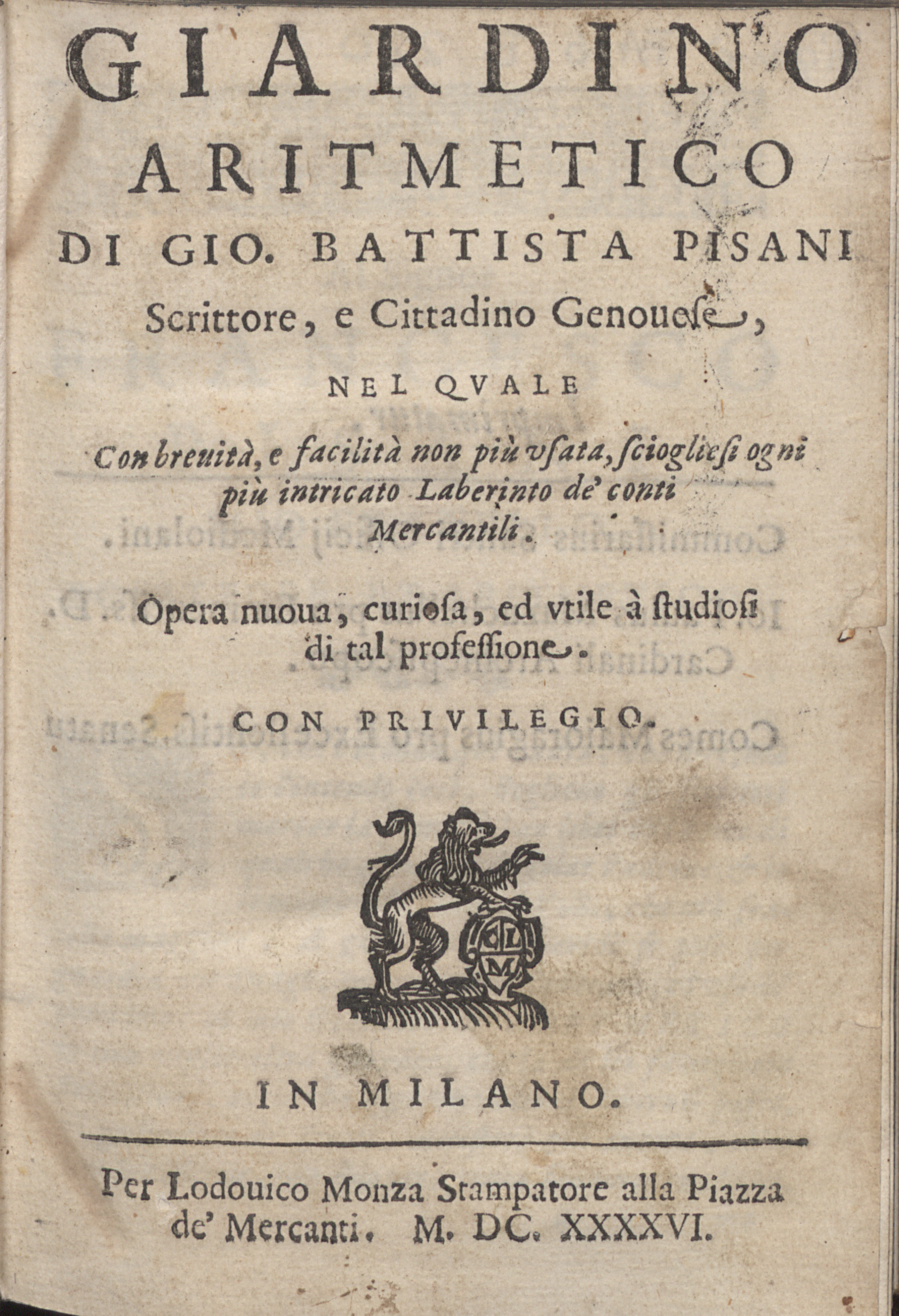
Giardino aritmetico, title page

Giovanni Battista Pisani, also known as Gio. Battista Pisani, was a 17th-century Genoese mathematician.

== Biography ==
He wrote The First Book of Modern Cursive Letters (Il primo libro di lettere corsive moderne, 1641) about calligraphy, followed by other educational works, Arithmetic Memorial (Memoriale aritmetico, 1644) and Arithmetic Garden (Giardino aritmetico, 1646), intended to solve arithmetic problems that were especially related to merchant activity.

== Works ==
- Il primo libro di lettere corsive moderne (in Italian). Genoa: Stampato appresso l'autore. 1641.
- Giardino aritmetico: nel quale con brevità, e facilità non più usata, sciogliesi ogni più intricato laberinto de' conti mercantili (in Italian). Milan: Lodovico Monza. 1646.
- Memoriale aritmetico: per indirizzo et aiuto di chi desidera con ogni facilità e sicurezza apprendere la prattica del conteggiare (in Italian). Venice: Stefano Curti. 1686 [1644].
