= Rocca Pisana =

Coordinates: 45°23′40″N 11°24′12″E

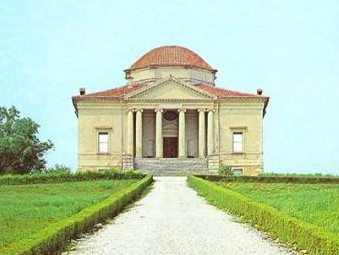
La Rocca Pisana

Rocca Pisana is a 16-century patrician villa in the comune of Lonigo, province of Vicenza, northern Italy, designed by the architect Vincenzo Scamozzi for the Pisani family. In Italy there are several villas called Villa Pisani, which take their name from this powerful Venetian family. This villa is also known as "La Rocca" or "La Rocca Pisana". Lonigo is also the home of Palladio's Villa Pisani (Bagnolo).

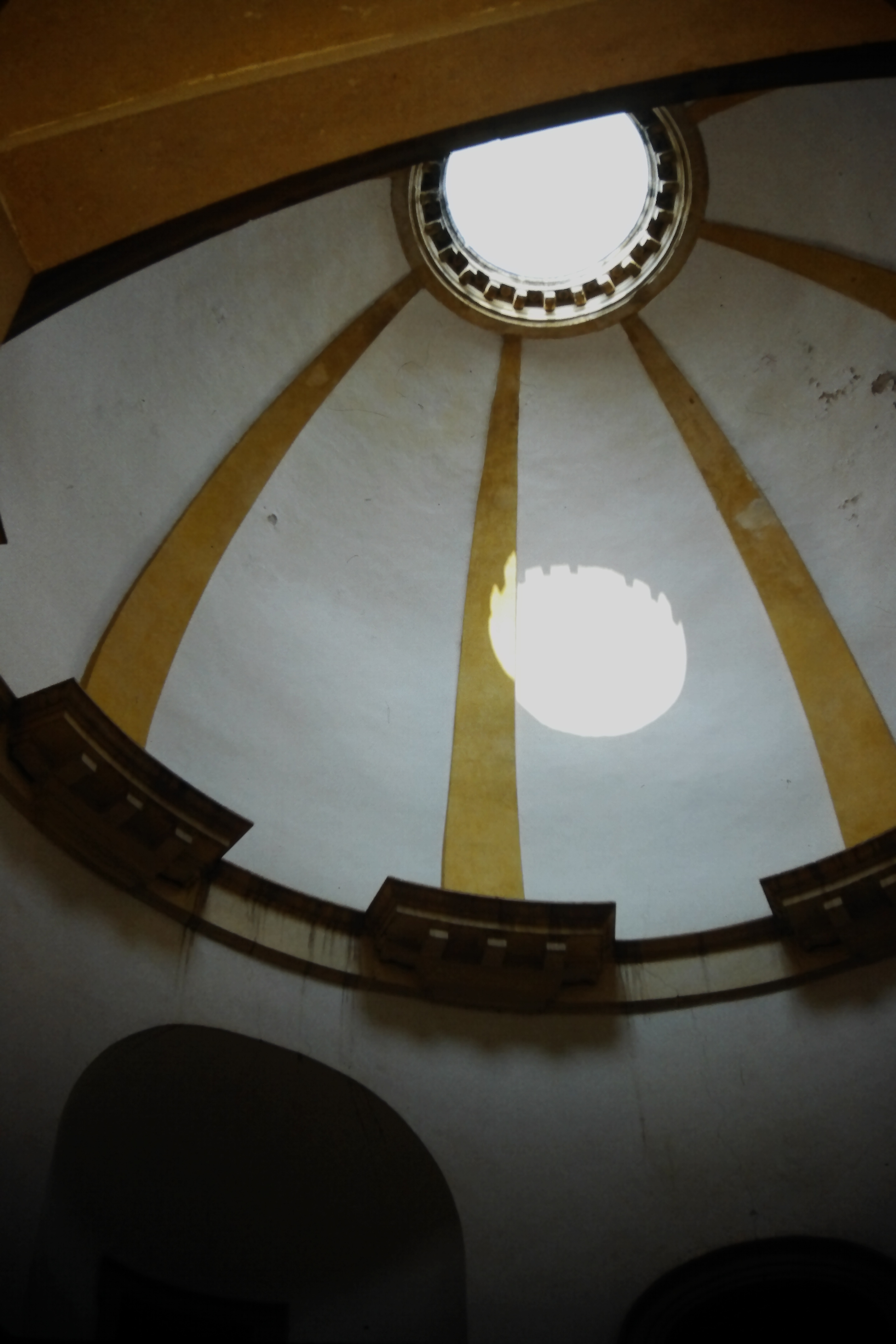
Interior of Dome

Dominating a hill-top site, the exterior of Rocca Pisana shows the influence of Palladio's Villa Capra "La Rotonda", but has differences, for example, the recessed portico. The internal layout is different from Villa Rotonda.

Rocca Pisana itself has been imitated, e.g. at Nuthall Temple, and possibly, for the octagonal dome at Chiswick House.
