= Nicolás Pisano =

Argentine footballer

Personal information
- Full name: Nicolás Osvaldo Pisano Casco
- Date of birth: 17 September 1982 (age 44)
- Place of birth: Buenos Aires, Argentina
- Height: 1.82 m (6 ft 0 in)
- Position: Centre-back

Youth career
- Argentinos Juniors

Senior career*
| Years | Team | Apps | (Gls) |
| 2001–2004 | Argentinos Juniors | 8 | (0) |
| 2004–2006 | Defensores de Belgrano | 29 | (0) |
| 2007 | Cienciano | 29 | (0) |
| 2008 | Atlético Minero | 22 | (1) |
| 2008–2009 | Sambenedettese | 3 | (0) |
| 2010–2011 | Gimnasia de Jujuy | 0 | (0) |
| 2011–2012 | Cobresal | 29 | (0) |
| 2012 | Douglas Haig | 1 | (0) |
| Total | | 121 | (1) |
- * Club domestic league appearances and goals

Nicolás Osvaldo Pisano Casco (born 17 September 1982) is an Argentine former footballer who played as a centre-back.

== Career ==
A product of Argentinos Juniors, Pisano made his debut in 2002.

In 2011–12, he played for Chilean club Cobresal.

He ended his career with Douglas Haig in 2012.
