= Giunta Pisano =

Italian painter

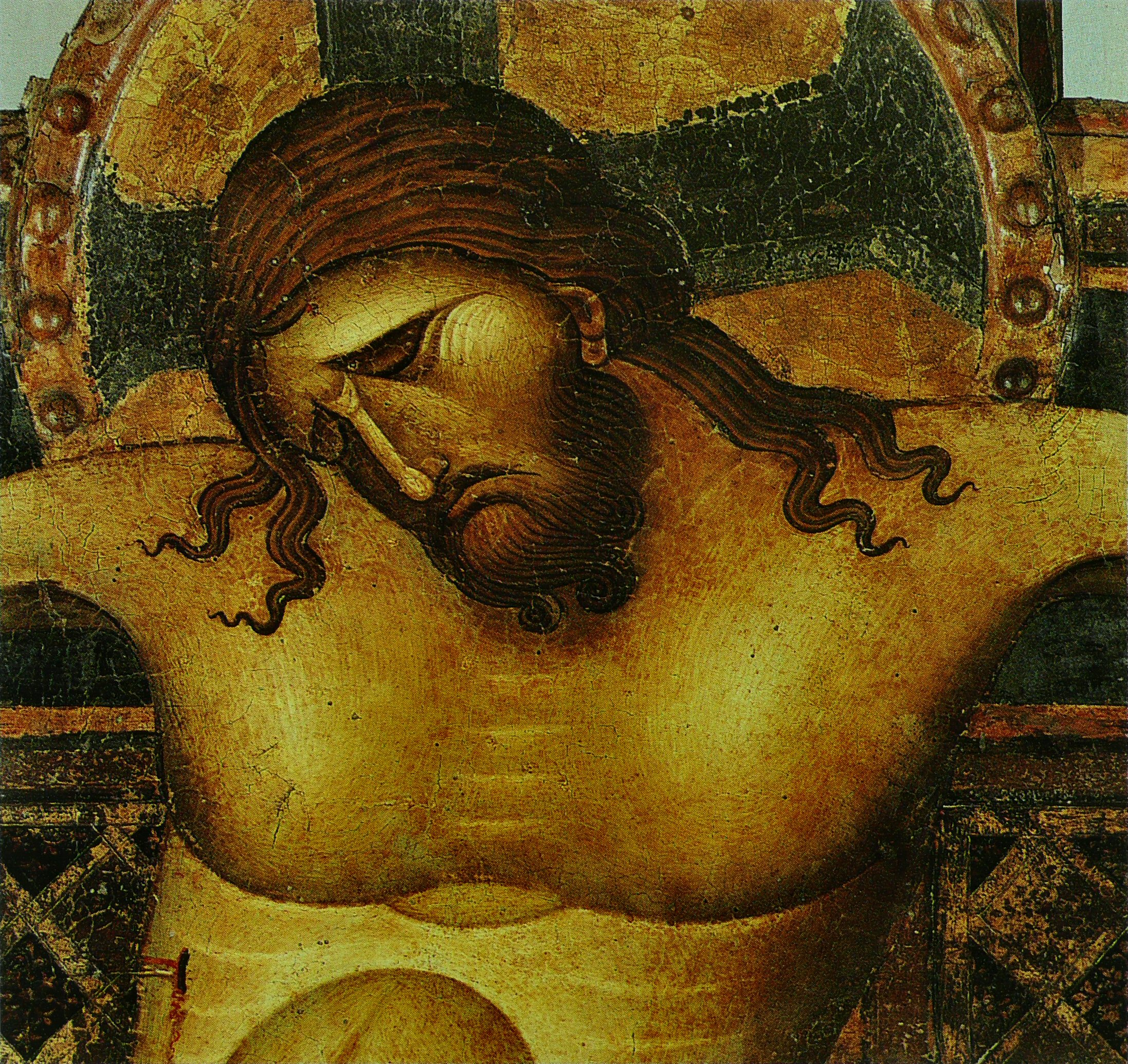
Detail of Crocifisso di San Domenico, Bologna

Giunta Pisano (12/13th-centuries) (also named Giunta da Pisa or Giunta Capitini) was an Italian painter. He is the earliest Italian painter whose name is found inscribed on an extant work. He is best known for his crucifixes.

== Works ==
He is said to have exercised his art from 1202 to 1236. He may perhaps have been born towards 1180 in Pisa, and died in or soon after 1250, but other accounts give 1202 as the date of his birth, and the more probable date of 1258 or thereabouts for his death. There is some ground for thinking that his family name was Capiteno or Capitino.

Giunta Pisano usually painted upon cloth stretched on wood and prepared with plaster.

The inscribed work, referred to above, is also one of his earliest. It is the Crocefisso di San Raniero, a crucifix, that hung for a long time in the kitchen of the convent of St Anne in Pisa. Other Pisan works of about the same date (as the one in National Museum of San Matteo, Pisa) are very barbarous, and, some of them may be also from the hand of Giunta Pisano before he had achieved his virtuosity (such as S. Benedetto Crucifixion).

A painting of a crucifixion (1236) for the High Altar of the upper church of Assisi no longer exists, but there exists an 18th-century engraving based on a copy of this portrait In the sacristy is a portrait of St Francis, also ascribed to Giunta; but it more probably belongs to the close of the 13th century.

His masterpiece is the imposing Crucifix (1250) in the left transept of Basilica of Saint Dominic in Bologna, with the writing in Latin "Cuius docta manus me pixit Junta Pisanus" (painted by the learned or skilled hand of Giunta Pisano). It is still much influenced by the Byzantine style and represents one of the best examples of 13th-century Italian painting.

== Influence ==
These crucifixes show that he initiated a new way of representing Christ, eventually substituting once and for all the traditional Byzantine image of Jesus serene though crucified (Christus gloriosus) with a Christ dying in agony (Christus patiens). This representation of Christ, and especially the crucifix in Basilica of St Dominic in Bologna, has much influenced Cimabue, who would continue on this style and develop his own more emotional style (as seen in his Crucifix in Basilica di Santa Croce, Florence). Another thoroughly Giuntesque Crucifixion is the right wing of a diptych from the Veneto, found at the Chicago Art Institute.

A number of unknown Italian artists have been identified as members of Giunta's circle; among them are the Master of the Blue Crucifixes, the Master of the Treasury, and Vicino da Pistoia. He appears to have influenced Rainaldetto di Ranuccio of Spoleto.

== Gallery ==
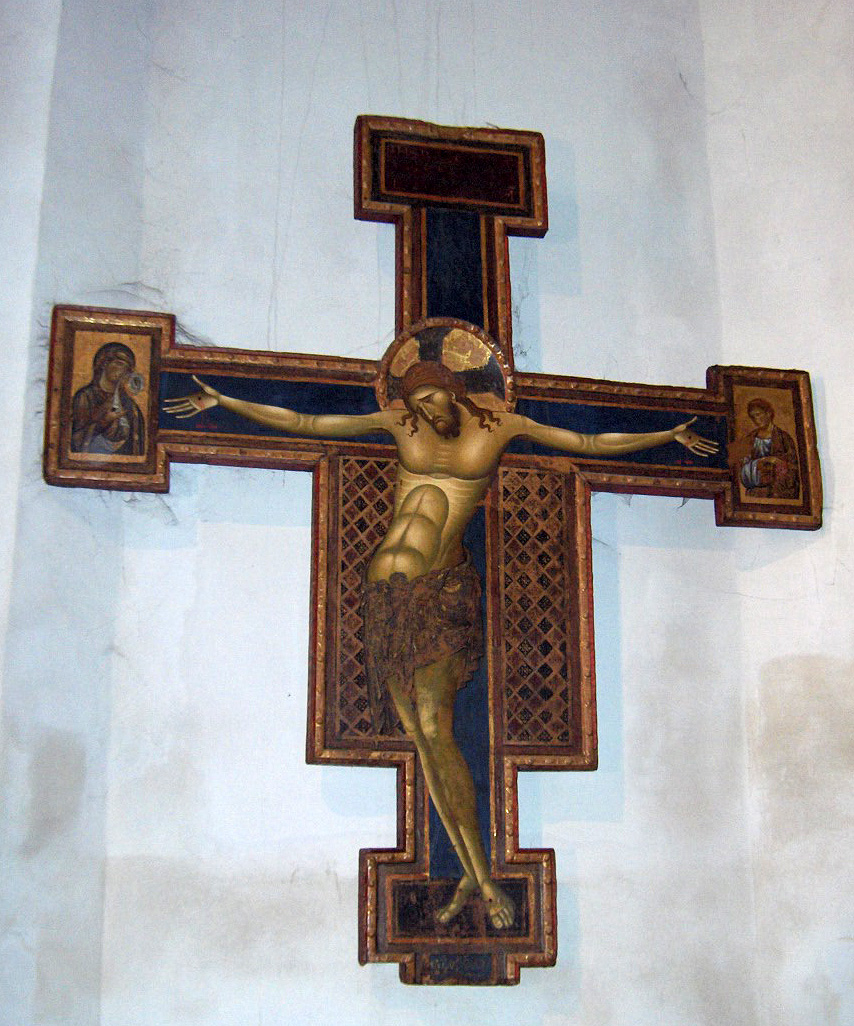
Giunta Pisano, Crucifix in the Basilica of Saint Dominic, Bologna

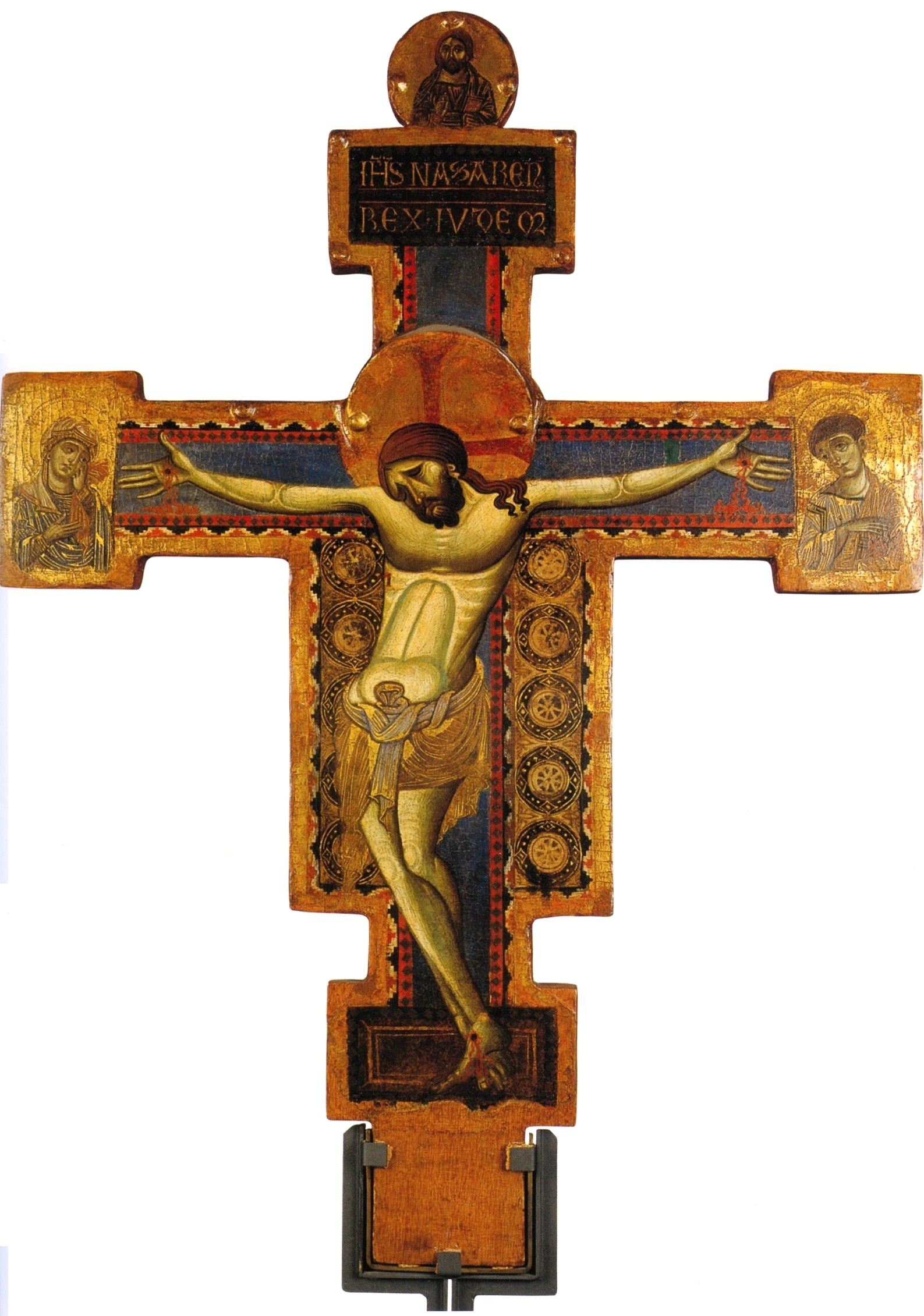
Crucifix in National Museum of San Matteo, Pisa

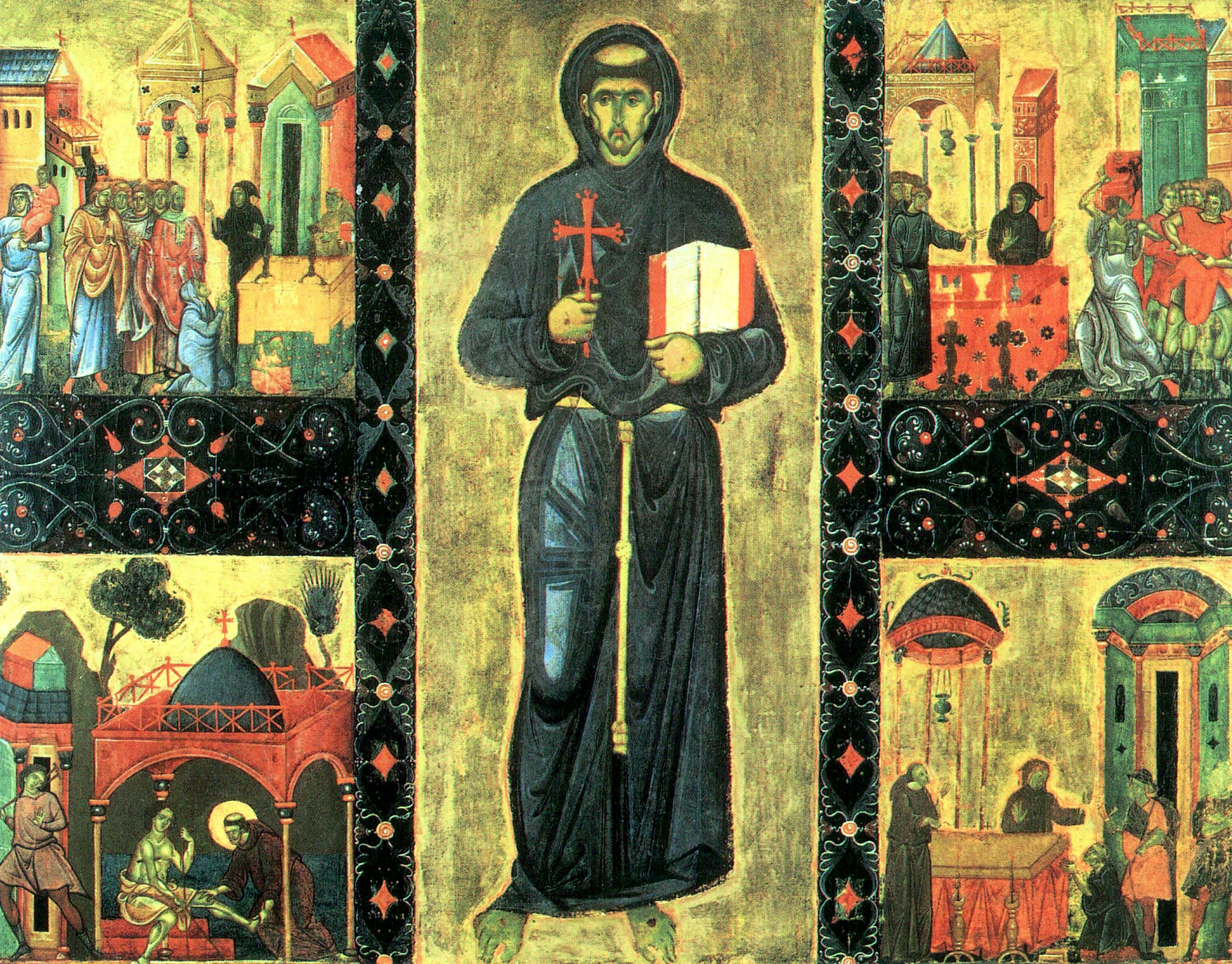
Giunta Pisano, St. Francis, Vatican Museums

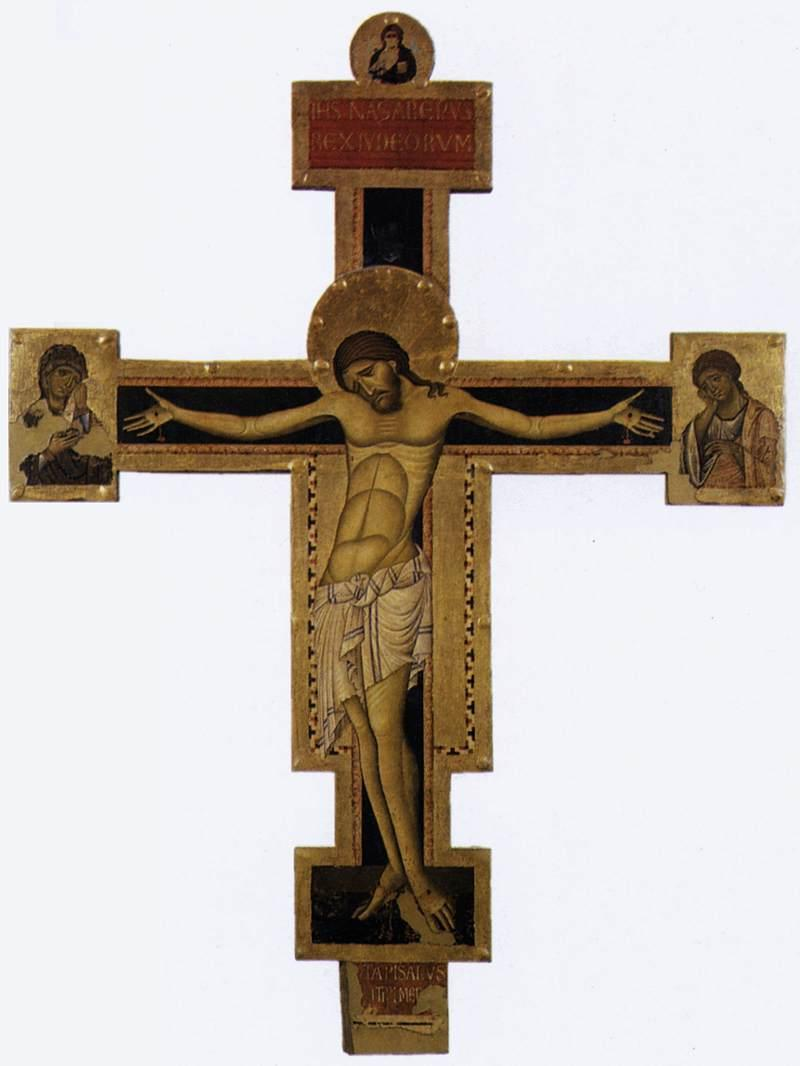
Crocifisso di Santa Maria degli Angeli, Assisi
