= Clarkstown Central School District =

School district in New York, United States

Location
- 62 Old Middletown Road, New City, NY 10956 United States

District information
- Type: Public
- Motto: "Continuing a Legacy of Education"
- Grades: K-12
- Established: 1949
- Superintendent: Dr. Marc Baiocco
- Schools: 15

Students and staff
- Students: 9,196
- Student–teacher ratio: 14:1

Other information
- Website: www.ccsd.edu

The Clarkstown Central School District is a K-12 public school district headquartered at the Chestnut Grove Administration Building in New City, in the town of Clarkstown, New York. The district operates fifteen schools serving students in much of the Town of Clarkstown, including the hamlets and villages of New City, Bardonia, Congers, and West Nyack, as well as portions of Nanuet and Valley Cottage. It is the largest school district in Rockland County by population, with a total of 9,196 students.

== Schools ==
=== Elementary Schools (K-5) ===
- Bardonia Elementary School (Bardonia, New York)
- Lakewood Elementary School (Congers, New York)
- Laurel Plains Elementary School (New City, New York)
- Link Elementary School (New City, New York
- Little Tor Elementary School (New City, New York)
- New City Elementary School (New City, New York)
- Strawtown Elementary School (West Nyack, New York)
- West Nyack Elementary School (West Nyack, New York)
- Woodglen Elementary School (New City, New York)

(Note: Congers Elementary School (Congers, New York), is no longer an active school but has since transitioned into the Clarkstown Learning Center).

=== Middle Schools (6-8) ===
The Felix Festa Middle School Campus is a very large middle school serving the entire district, located in New City, New York. Administratively, the campus operates as three separate schools:

- Felix Festa Achievement Middle School (West Nyack, New York
- Felix Festa Character Middle School (West Nyack, New York)
- Felix Festa Determination Middle School (West Nyack, New York)

=== High Schools (9-12) ===
- Clarkstown High School North (New City, New York)
- Clarkstown High School South (West Nyack, New York)

=== K-12 Schools ===
- Birchwood School (West Nyack, New York)

=== Former & Suspended Schools ===
- Congers Elementary School in Congers has been closed since the 2013-14 school year due to emergency repairs. The Clarkstown community successfully passed a bond vote to repair the building, but the Board voted in February 2015 to keep the building closed and to repurpose it.
- Chestnut Grove School in New City has been converted into district offices.
- Street School in New City has been converted into a community center.
- Rockland Lake School (Congers closed in 1959.
