= Bardonia station (Erie Railroad) =

Railroad station in New York, USA

Bardonia
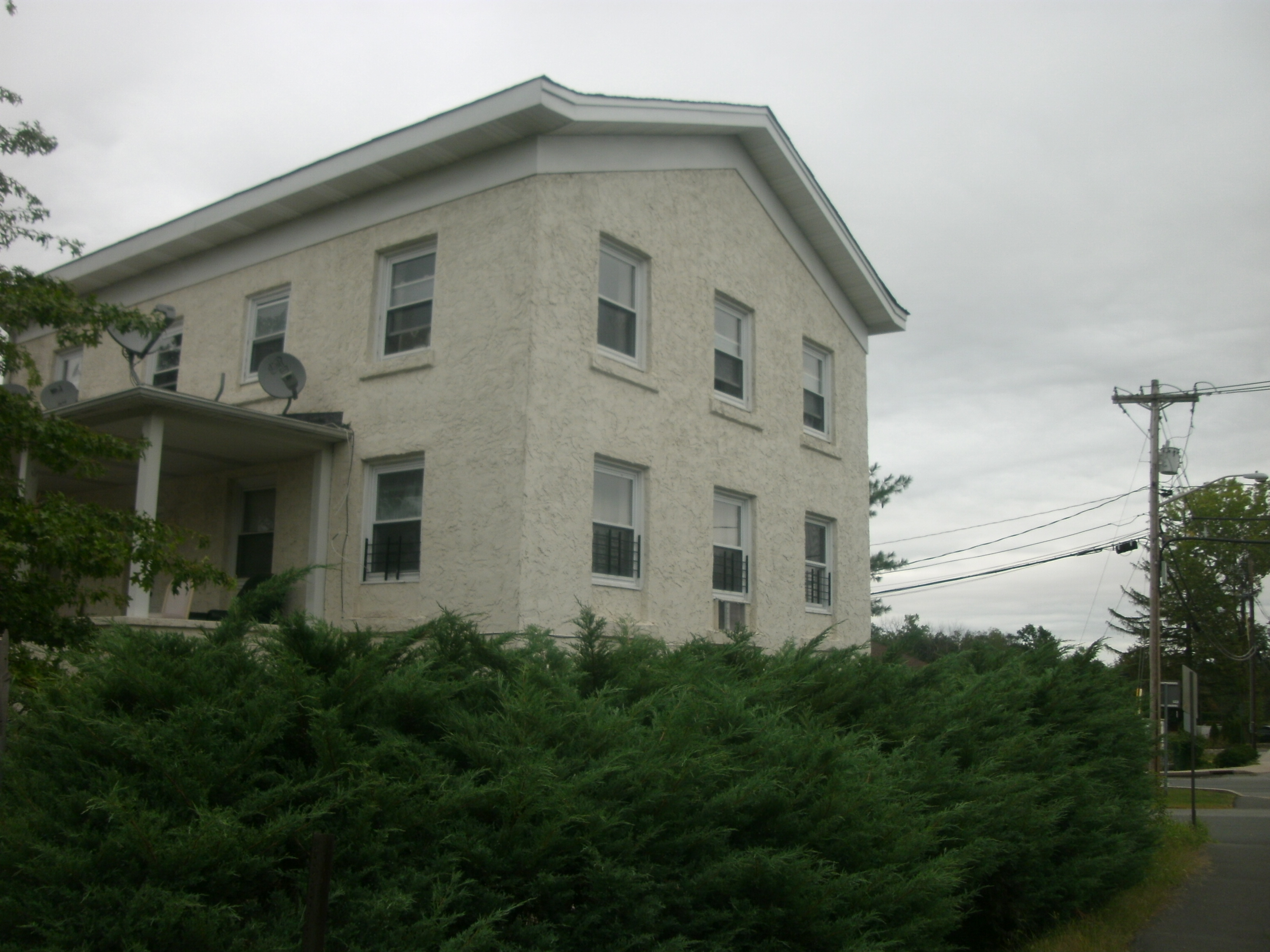
- The former Bardonia station depot in September 2011.

General information
- Location: 22 Bardonia Road, Bardonia, Clarkstown, New York 10954
- Coordinates: 41.109436°N 73.995271°W
- Line: New City Branch
- Platforms: 1 side platform
- Tracks: 1

Other information
- Station code: 807

History
- Opened: May 3, 1875
- Closed: July 5, 1939

Former services
Preceding station	Erie Railroad	Following station
Germonds toward New City	New City Branch	Nanuet Terminus
Location

Bardonia was a station on the Erie Railroad in Bardonia, New York. It was originally built along the New Jersey and New York Railroad's New City Branch, which was later incorporated into the Erie Railroad system. Rather than construct a station at Bardonia, the railroad rented a local entrepreneur's three-story general store for $50–$60 (1916 USD).

Both pedestrian and freight service ended on the New City Branch in 1939, and the tracks were removed soon thereafter. The old station house remained intact near the corner of Bardonia Road and NY 304 until 2014, when it was demolished and replaced by a CVS Pharmacy.

== History ==
The idea of a railroad between Nanuet and the hamlet of New City, began on May 23, 1871 when the Nanuet and New City Railroad Company filed articles of association. This railroad, a 4.32-mile (6.95 km) branch of the New Jersey and New York Railroad, began construction between 1872 and 1874. The railroad, an intended extension to Stony Point, came into existence when the New Jersey and New York took a different route via Spring Valley.

During construction of the railroad, the right-of-way proceeded near the property of John Bardon, a local brewer from Bavaria. Bardon, finding out that the railroad would be passing through, built a new store along the railroad. In doing so, he also offered the railroad a waiting room for a new railroad stop. Bardon's son, Henry, took part in his father's business and when the railroad opened in May 1875, became station agent. At the time, the station was known as Bardon's Station. Despite construction completing on March 11, 1874, the first official train between Nanuet and New City began on May 3, 1875.

== Bibliography ==
- Green, Frank Bertangue (1886). The History of Rockland County. New York, New York: A.S. Barnes and Co. ISBN 9781976589508.
- Poor, Henry Varnum (1882). Poor's Manual of Railroads: Volume 15. New York, New York: H.V. & H.W. Poor.
