= Clarkstown, New York =

Town in New York, United States

- Town
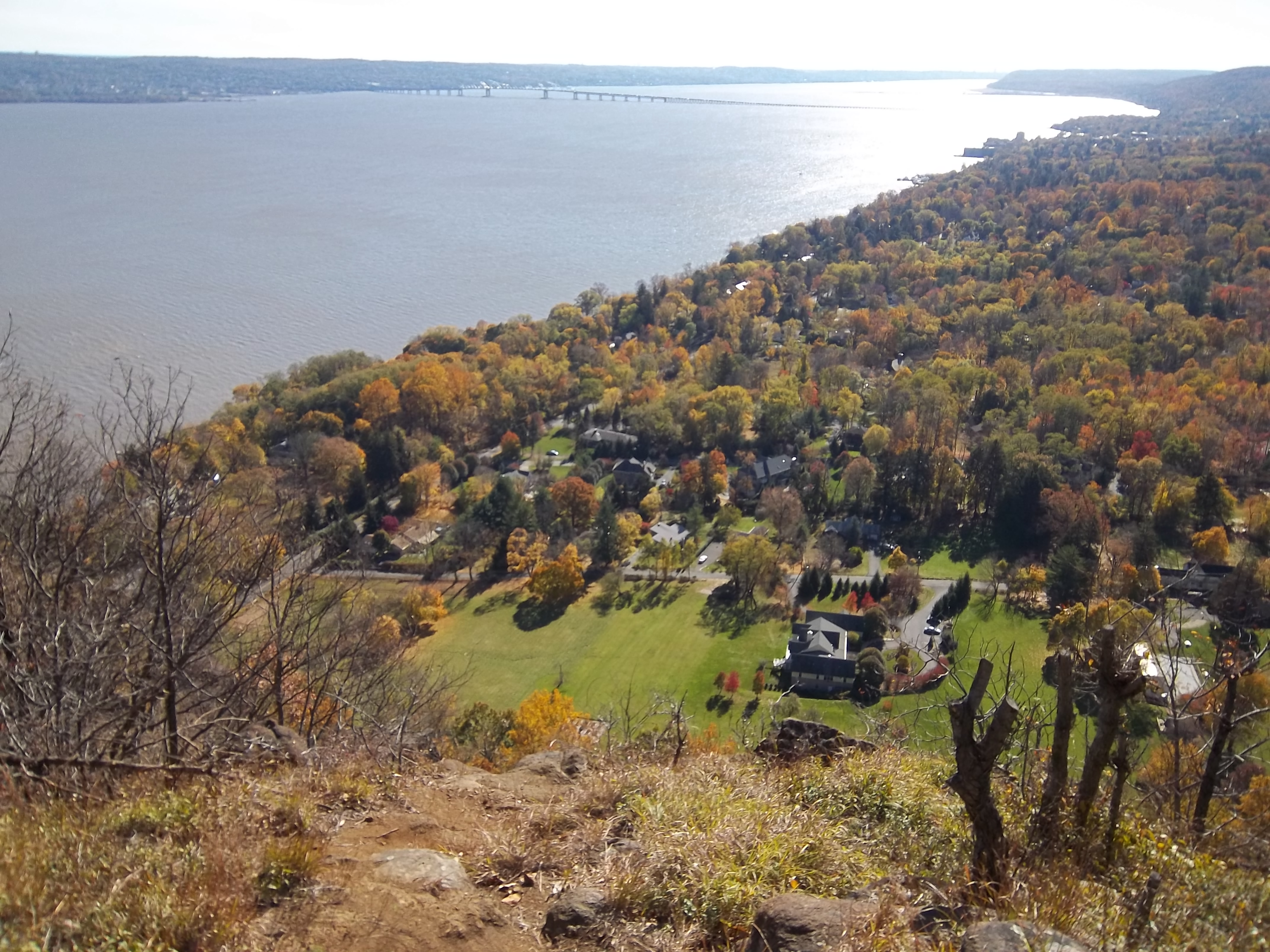
- Hook Mountain in Autumn

- Seal

- Location in Rockland County and the state of New York.

- Location within the state of New York
- Coordinates: 41°7′34″N 73°58′49″W
- Country: United States
- State: New York
- County: Rockland
- Established: March 18, 1791

Government
  - Supervisor: George Hoehmann (R)

Area
  - Total: 47.07 sq mi (121.91 km^{2})
  - Land: 38.47 sq mi (99.63 km^{2})
  - Water: 8.60 sq mi (22.28 km^{2})
- Elevation: 105 ft (32 m)

Population (2020)
  - Total: 86,855
  - Estimate (2025): 89,659 ▲
  - Density: 2,330/sq mi (900/km^{2})
- Time zone: UTC-5 (Eastern (EST))
  - Summer (DST): UTC-4 (EDT)
- ZIP code: 10956 (New City), 10920 (Congers), 10954 (Nanuet), 10960 (Nyack), 10989 (Valley Cottage), 10994 (West Nyack)
- Area code: 845
- FIPS code: 36-15968
- GNIS feature ID: 0978832
- Website: clarkstown.gov

Clarkstown is a town in Rockland County, New York, United States. The town is on the eastern border of the county, located north of the town of Orangetown, east of the town of Ramapo, south of the town of Haverstraw, and west of the Hudson River. As of the 2020 census, the town had a total population of 86,855. The hamlet of New City, the county seat of Rockland County, is also the seat of town government and of the Clarkstown Police Department, the county sheriff's office, and the county correctional facility. New City makes up about 41.47% of the town's population.

== History ==
The town of Clarkstown was created in 1791 from the town of Haverstraw in Orange County, before Rockland County was formed.

In 1994, Clarkstown was involved in litigation that challenged a town ordinance, that required all waste picked up in the town to be sorted for recyclables at a specific privately operated facility. The case made it to the United States Supreme Court in C&A Carbone, Inc. v. Town of Clarkstown, in which the ordinance was held unconstitutional.

== Geography ==
The Hudson River defines the eastern border of the town, which is opposite the town of Mount Pleasant in Westchester County.

According to the United States Census Bureau, the town has a total area of 46.9 square miles (121 km^{2}), of which 38.5 square miles (100 km^{2}) is land and 8.4 square miles (22 km^{2}) (17.87%) is water.

The New York State Thruway (Interstate 87/Interstate 287) intersects the Palisades Interstate Parkway in the town.

=== Communities and locations ===
- Bardonia – A hamlet southeast of New City.
- Brownsell Corners – A hamlet in the north part of the town, now considered a part of New City.
- Centenary – A hamlet near the north town line, now the north-easternmost side of New City.
- Central Nyack – A hamlet on the south town line.
- Congers – A hamlet in the eastern part of the town.
- Lake DeForest – A long lake with a north–south orientation.
- High Tor State Park – A state park along the northern town line.
- Germonds – A location south of New City.
- Hook Mountain State Park – A state park in the eastern part of the town.
- Lake Lucille – A location in the northern part of the town.
- Mount Ivy – A hamlet on the northern town line.
- Nanuet – A hamlet.
- New City – A hamlet that is the county seat.
  - New City Condominiums– A neighborhood near the center of New City.
  - New City Park – A community in South New City.
- Nyack Beach State Park – A state park near the Hudson River.
- Oakbrook – A hamlet east of Spring Valley
- Rockland Lake – A hamlet located west of a lake of the same name.
- Rockland Lake State Park – A state park in the eastern part of the town.
- Spring Valley – A village, the eastern portion of which is within the town.
- Upper Nyack – A village north of Nyack.
- Valley Cottage – A hamlet in the eastern part of the town.
- West Nyack – A hamlet west of Nyack village.

=== Climate ===
Clarkstown has a humid continental climate (Köppen: Dfa).

Climate data for Clarkstown
Month	Jan	Feb	Mar	Apr	May	Jun	Jul	Aug	Sep	Oct	Nov	Dec	Year
Mean daily maximum °F (°C)	36.1 (2.3)	39.2 (4.0)	47.7 (8.7)	59.4 (15.2)	69.1 (20.6)	77.7 (25.4)	82.9 (28.3)	81.1 (27.3)	74.3 (23.5)	62.8 (17.1)	51.6 (10.9)	41.0 (5.0)	60.2 (15.7)
Daily mean °F (°C)	29.5 (−1.4)	31.8 (−0.1)	39.6 (4.2)	50.4 (10.2)	60.3 (15.7)	69.1 (20.6)	74.5 (23.6)	72.7 (22.6)	65.7 (18.7)	54.7 (12.6)	44.1 (6.7)	34.9 (1.6)	52.3 (11.3)
Mean daily minimum °F (°C)	22.8 (−5.1)	24.4 (−4.2)	31.6 (−0.2)	41.9 (5.5)	51.6 (10.9)	60.8 (16.0)	66.7 (19.3)	65.5 (18.6)	57.9 (14.4)	47.1 (8.4)	36.7 (2.6)	28.8 (−1.8)	44.7 (7.0)
Average precipitation inches (mm)	2.44 (62)	2.30 (58)	2.84 (72)	2.20 (56)	2.60 (66)	2.77 (70)	3.43 (87)	3.43 (87)	2.90 (74)	2.70 (69)	2.04 (52)	2.92 (74)	32.57 (827)
Source: Weather.Directory

== Demographics ==
Historical population
Census	Pop.	Note	%±
1820	1,808		—
1830	2,298		27.1%
1840	2,533		10.2%
1850	3,111		22.8%
1860	3,874		24.5%
1870	4,137		6.8%
1880	4,378		5.8%
1890	5,216		19.1%
1900	6,305		20.9%
1910	7,980		26.6%
1920	7,317		−8.3%
1930	10,188		39.2%
1940	12,251		20.2%
1950	15,674		27.9%
1960	33,196		111.8%
1970	61,653		85.7%
1980	77,091		25.0%
1990	79,346		2.9%
2000	82,082		3.4%
2010	84,187		2.6%
2020	86,855		3.2%
2025 (est.)	89,659		3.2%
U.S. Decennial Census 2020

As of the 2010 Census, there were 84,187 people, 29,234 households, and 22,186 families residing in the Town of Clarkstown. The population density was 1,800 per square mile. There were 30,314 housing units at an average density of 646.35 per square mile. There were 29,234 households, out of which 27.9% had children under the age of 18 living with them, 62.1% were married couples living together, 10.4% had a female householder with no husband present, and 24.1% were non-families. 36.2% of all households were made up of individuals, and 31.8% had someone living alone who was 65 years of age of older. The average household size was 2.84 and the average family size was 3.28. The median age was 42.8 years.

As of the census of 2000, there were 82,082 people, 27,697 households, and 21,991 families residing in the town. The population density was 2,129.7 inhabitants per square mile (822.3/km^{2}). There were 28,220 housing units at an average density of 732.2 per square mile (282.7/km^{2}). The racial makeup of the town was 79.97% White, 7.87% African American, 0.13% Native American, 7.90% Asian, 0.10% Pacific Islander, 1.99% from other races, and 2.03% from two or more races. Hispanic or Latino of any race were 6.92% of the population.

There were 27,697 households, out of which 36.9% had children under the age of 18 living with them, 67.4% were married couples living together, 9.1% had a female householder with no husband present, and 20.6% were non-families. 16.9% of all households were made up of individuals, and 6.5% had someone living alone who was 65 years of age or older. The average household size was 2.90 and the average family size was 3.27.

In the town, the population was spread out, with 24.7% under the age of 18, 6.6% from 18 to 24, 28.3% from 25 to 44, 28.1% from 45 to 64, and 12.3% who were 65 years of age or older. The median age was 39 years. For every 100 females, there were 94.3 males. For every 100 females age 18 and over, there were 90.3 males.

According to a 2007 estimate, the median income for a household in the town was $92,121, and the median income for a family was $104,909. Males had a median income of $57,773 versus $40,805 for females. The per capita income for the town was $34,430. About 2.5% of families and 3.8% of the population were below the poverty line, including 4.5% of those under age 18 and 3.4% of those age 65 or over.

As of the 2020 Census, there were 86,855 people residing in the Town of Clarkstown.

Clarkstown is the most densely populated town in Rockland County and is home to New City, which is the county seat. Clarkstown has more business districts in it than any other town in Rockland County, including the Palisades Center, which is among the largest malls in the world.

== Government ==
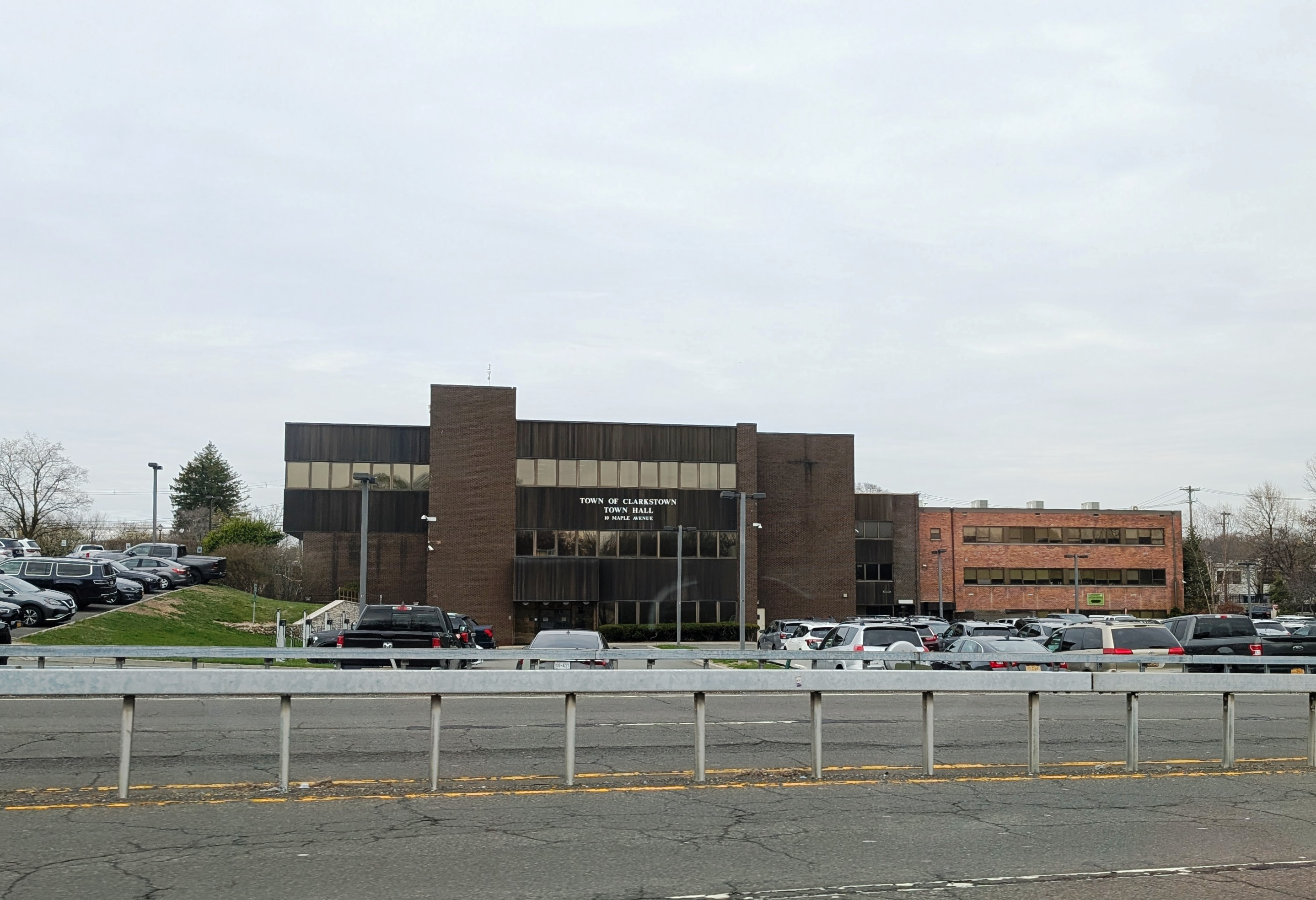
Clarkstown Town Hall in New City

The Town of Clarkstown has as its chief executive a Town Supervisor. The current Town Supervisor is George Hoehmann. Clarkstown is represented in the United States House of Representatives by Congressman Michael Lawler. It is represented in New York State government by Senator Bill Weber and Assemblyman Kenneth Zebrowski Jr.

Clarkstown is divided into four wards (87 Election Districts).

== Education ==
The town of Clarkstown is served by several school districts. The majority of the town is served by the Clarkstown Central School District, which educates students in New City, Bardonia, Congers, and West Nyack. The village of Upper Nyack as well as the hamlets of Valley Cottage and Central Nyack are served by the Nyack Public Schools, while the Hamlet of Nanuet is served by the Nanuet Union Free School District. A small portion on the western town border is served by the East Ramapo Central School District.

High schools located in the town include Clarkstown South High School in West Nyack, Clarkstown North High School in New City, Nyack Senior High School in Upper Nyack, and Nanuet Senior High School in Nanuet.

== Infrastructure ==
Clarkstown Mini-Trans is the provider of local mass transportation in Clarkstown. It has five bus routes.

Transport of Rockland provides local mass transportation.

Commuter transportation is provided by New Jersey Transit's Pascack Valley Line at Nanuet.

Rockland Coaches provides express service to the Port Authority Bus Terminal in New York City.
