= Bardonia, New York =

- Hamlet & CDP
- Location in Rockland County and the state of New York.

- Location within the state of New York
- Coordinates: 41°6′51″N 73°58′59″W
- Country: United States
- State: New York
- County: Rockland
- Town: Clarkstown

Area
  - Total: 2.76 sq mi (7.14 km^{2})
  - Land: 2.56 sq mi (6.64 km^{2})
  - Water: 0.19 sq mi (0.50 km^{2})
- Elevation: 300 ft (90 m)

Population (2020)
  - Total: 4,249
  - Density: 1,658.3/sq mi (640.27/km^{2})
- Time zone: UTC-5 (Eastern (EST))
  - Summer (DST): UTC-4 (EDT)
- ZIP code: 10954
- Area code: 845
- FIPS code: 36-04396
- GNIS feature ID: 0942996

Bardonia is a hamlet and census-designated place in the town of Clarkstown, Rockland County, New York, United States. It is located northeast of Nanuet, northwest of West Nyack, south of New City, and west of Valley Cottage. As of the 2020 census, Bardonia had a population of 4,249.

Bardonia is north of the New York State Thruway.

Bardonia is named for the Bardon brothers - John and the twins Phillip and Conrad - who came from Bavaria in 1849 and opened several businesses. The Bardonia railroad station, which no longer exists, was opened there in 1875.

== Geography ==
Bardonia is located at 41°6′51″N 73°58′59″W (41.114128, -73.983042).

According to the United States Census Bureau, the CDP has a total area of 2.9 square miles (7.5 km^{2}), of which 2.6 square miles (6.7 km^{2}) is land and 0.3 square miles (0.8 km^{2}) (11.42%) is water.

== Demographics ==
Historical population
Census	Pop.	Note	%±
1990	4,487		—
2000	4,367		−2.7%
2010	4,108		−5.9%
2020	4,249		3.4%

=== 2020 census ===
As of the 2020 census, Bardonia had a population of 4,249. The median age was 47.0 years. 19.2% of residents were under the age of 18 and 24.6% of residents were 65 years of age or older. For every 100 females there were 95.8 males, and for every 100 females age 18 and over there were 93.7 males age 18 and over.

100.0% of residents lived in urban areas, while 0.0% lived in rural areas.

There were 1,468 households in Bardonia, of which 30.4% had children under the age of 18 living in them. Of all households, 63.8% were married-couple households, 10.4% were households with a male householder and no spouse or partner present, and 21.6% were households with a female householder and no spouse or partner present. About 18.5% of all households were made up of individuals and 12.7% had someone living alone who was 65 years of age or older.

There were 1,494 housing units, of which 1.7% were vacant. The homeowner vacancy rate was 0.7% and the rental vacancy rate was 0.4%.

Racial composition as of the 2020 census
Race	Number	Percent
White	3,089	72.7%
Black or African American	143	3.4%
American Indian and Alaska Native	5	0.1%
Asian	564	13.3%
Native Hawaiian and Other Pacific Islander	0	0.0%
Some other race	148	3.5%
Two or more races	300	7.1%
Hispanic or Latino (of any race)	447	10.5%

=== 2000 census ===
As of the census of 2000, there were 4,367 people, 1,450 households and 1,189 families residing in the CDP. The population density was 1,704.6 inhabitants per square mile (658.1/km^{2}). There were 1,468 housing units at an average density of 573.0 per square mile (221.2/km^{2}). The racial makeup of the CDP was 87.54% white, 1.53% African American, .23% Native American, 7.88% Asian, 1.4% from other races, and 1.42% from two or more races. Hispanic or Latino of any race were 5.15% of the population.

There were 1,450 households, of which 38.1% had children under the age of 18 living with them, 72.7% were married couples living together, 7.0% had a female householder with no husband present, and 18.0% were non-families. 15.9% of all households were made up of individuals, and 9.6% had someone living alone who was 65 years of age or older. The average household size was 3.01 and the average family size was 3.37.

Age distribution was 25.2% under the age of 18, 7.1% from 18 to 24, 23.8% from 25 to 44, 31.0% from 45 to 64, and 12.9% who were 65 years of age or older. The median age was 41 years. For every 100 females, there were 94 males. For every 100 females age 18 and over, there were 90.8 males.

The median household income was $96,068, and the median family income was $104,415. Males had a median income of $70,060 versus $43,700 for females. The per capita income for the CDP was $37,677. About .8% of families and 1.4% of the population were below the poverty line, including 2.3% of those under age 18 and 1.4% of those age 65 or over.

Bardonia (within Clarkstown) was the 2nd safest town in the U.S in a recent study.

== Education ==
Bardonia is located within the Clarkstown Central School District's boundaries. The district's 'Bardonia Elementary School serves the hamlet. Secondary students from Bardonia attend Felix Festa Middle School and Clarkstown South High School in nearby West Nyack. The private Catholic Albertus Magnus High School is also located in Bardonia.

== Transportation ==
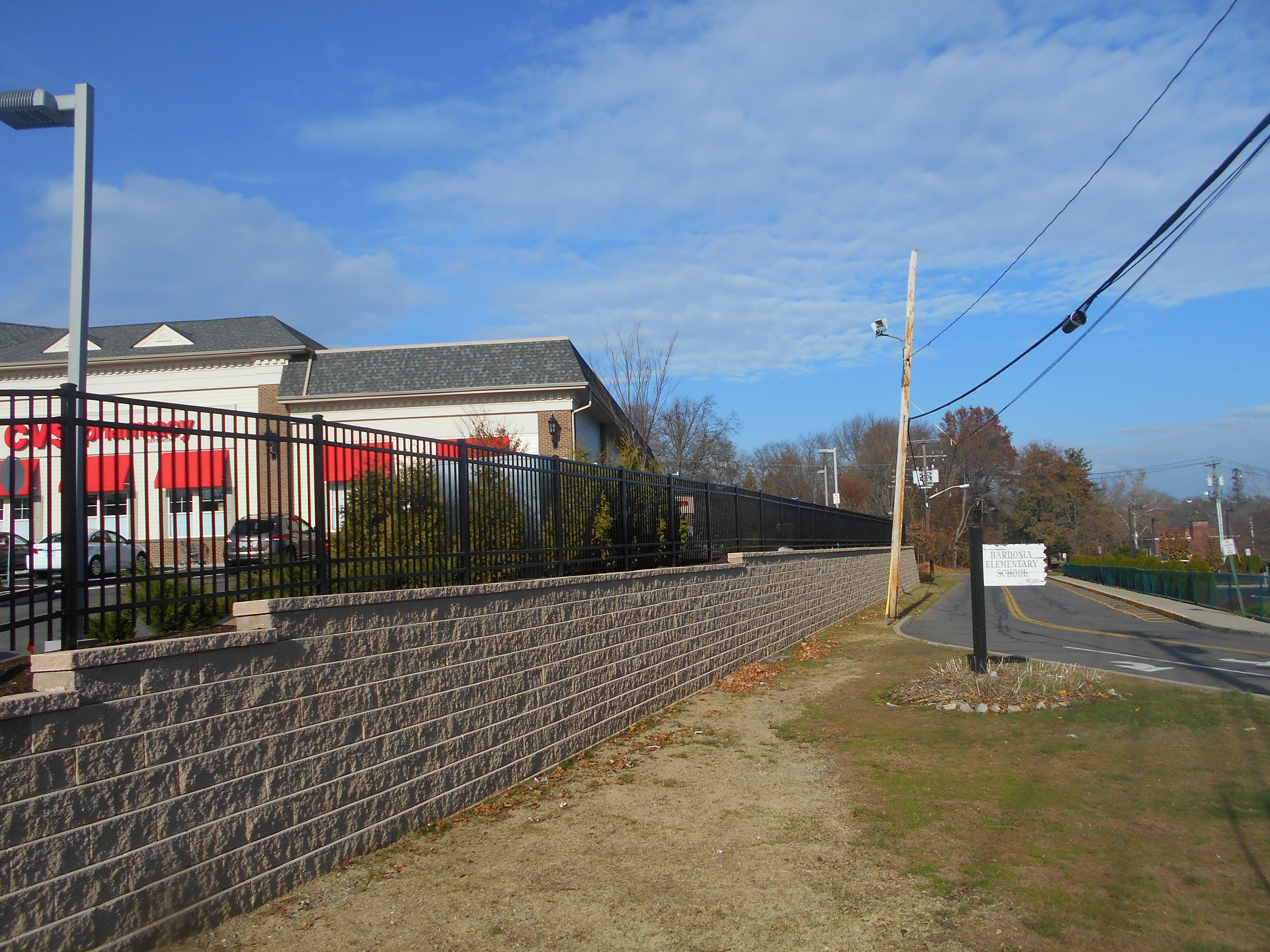
Location of the former Bardonia Railway Station

Bardonia was previously served by the New Jersey and New York Railroad's New City Branch, which was later incorporated into the Erie Railroad system. Service along the New City Branch ended in 1939, and the tracks were quickly removed thereafter. The old Bardonia railway station house existed in its place near the corner of Bardonia Road and New York State Route 304 until 2014, when it was demolished to make way for a CVS.

Today, Bardonia does not have rail service; its nearest railway station is 2.5 miles to the south at Nanuet. Bardonia is provided by Rockland Coaches Bus Routes 47, 49, and 49J, with service to New York City's Port Authority Bus Terminal and to various locations throughout Midtown Manhattan.

== Notable person ==
- Steven Mercurio (b. 1956), composer conductor
