= Clarkstown High School North =

Location
- 151 Congers Road; New City, New York 10956; United States; 41.1501°N 73.9709°W

Information
- School type: Public
- Established: 1953
- Status: Open
- School district: Clarkstown Central School District
- Superintendent: Marc P. Baiocco
- CEEB code: 333325
- Faculty: 117.43 (on FTE basis)
- Grades: 9 to 12
- Enrollment: 1,209 (2024-2025)
- Student to teacher ratio: 10.30
- Language: English
- Hours in school day: 6.5
- Campus type: Suburban
- Colors: Purple and gold
- Athletics: American football, association football (soccer), baseball, basketball, bowling, cheerleading, crew, cross country, dance, fencing, field hockey, flag football, golf, gymnastics, ice hockey, lacrosse, skiing, softball, swimming, tennis, track and field, volleyball, wrestling Section 1 (NYSPHSAA)
- Mascot: Ram
- Team name: Rams
- Publication: Chaos (science journal), Epiphany (literary magazine)
- Newspaper: Ram's Horn
- Yearbook: SAGA
- Website: https://north.ccsd.edu/

Clarkstown High School North is a high school located in New City, New York, United States, educating students in grades 9 through 12. It is one of two high schools in the Clarkstown Central School District (CCSD). Since 2006, North has offered the International Baccalaureate Diploma Programme to juniors and seniors.

In 2015 U.S. News & World Report ranked Clarkstown North Senior High School with a silver award as the 135 Best High School in New York State and 1,329 nationally.

The town of Clarkstown recognizes January 25 as Clarkstown Rams Football Day, as of 1994.

== Buildings ==
Clarkstown North consists of three buildings: the Main building, the Annex, and the X-wing or New building.

=== Main ===
The original building of Clarkstown High School North is the Main, which is built off an early 1900s mansion. Before the construction of Clarkstown High School South, this was the only high school in the Clarkstown Central School District. The Main has the language department, the English department, some of the science rooms, the filmmaking studio, a two-room writer's lab, a two-story library, a large gym with boys and girls locker rooms, a smaller gym that serves as the wrestling room, an auditorium and theater department, an orchestra room, a courtyard, a large lunchroom, a special education program, and a bomb shelter. It is the largest building in the school.

=== Annex ===
The second building is commonly referred to as the "Annex" and was completed by the 1960–61 school year. Before Felix Festa Middle School was constructed, the Annex was the school district's junior high school. However, the two buildings were not connected, so for a long time students had to walk outside to get from class to class. The Annex is built on a hill and has three floors. The top floor is referred to as the fifth floor, the one right below it in the middle of the hill is the fourth floor, and the bottom floor is the third. The third floor has science rooms, the fourth has math rooms, and the fifth has more math rooms, health rooms, study halls, a small gym with locker rooms, two small cafeterias, and the guidance office.

During the 1980s, classrooms were built in trailers called "The Mobiles." The Mobiles had been put up in 1985 during the construction of the new library in the Main. These were demolished before the start of the 2009–10 school year.

=== X-Wing ===
The new building extension was built during the 2004–2005 school year. This expansion, called officially the "X-Wing" and more colloquially, the "New," connected the "Main" and "Annex" buildings, and also added many classrooms. The building stands on two floors consisting of specialty classrooms, including a new band room on the top floor, and art rooms on the bottom floor, as well as many social studies classrooms. The bottom floor is referred to as the sixth floor, and the top is referred to as the seventh. The building was intended to have air conditioning, but the budget was apparently not met.

== Vermin problem and Halloween 2007 walkout ==
On October 31, 2007, Clarkstown High School North students, ranging from 9th to 12th grade, held a walk-out to protest the sanitary conditions of the school. The protest started in front of the annex building and students walked to the far ball field. They chanted and held signs from approximately 12:20pm to 1:00pm while a news helicopter hovered above.

This was the largest walkout in district history. The other previous walkout was in 1975 and happened because students were against the new rules regarding study halls.

Originally, Clarkstown North Students were planning to walk to Town Hall, in the heart of New City, New York. The plan was quickly scrapped as Clarkstown Police Department threatened to arrest anyone who left school grounds on account that it was unlawful assembly and the students could quickly turn into a riot.

At an emergency school board meeting the next evening, students and parents spoke about the conditions at Clarkstown North. The meeting ran from 7:30pm to 11:30pm. It was revealed that there were over 700 recorded absent students during the walkout, far more than the estimated 200–300. The following day, there was a meeting immediately after school for all students to discuss ways to improve Clarkstown North.

== Field renovation ==
In June of the 2007–2008 school year, construction began on the football field and track. The track and playing field were replaced by a new rubber track and artificial-turf football field. The renovations were scheduled to be finished by the start of the 2008–2009 school year, but were completed on October 25, 2008.

The turf undertook its most recent renovations in the spring of 2020. The turf was removed and replaced with new, alternating tones of green and purple end zones.

== Athletics ==
The school offers a variety of varsity and junior varsity sports, and competes as part of Section One of the New York State Public High School Athletic Association. Clarkstown North's rival schools include Clarkstown South, the other senior high school in the Clarkstown Central School District. The winner of the annual football game between the two schools is awarded the Supervisor's Cup. Despite the inherent rivalry, Clarkstown North and Clarkstown South compete together as one "Clarkstown" team in several varsity sports such as ice hockey, skiing, fencing, and swimming/diving.

The varsity girls soccer team won section and region titles in 2021.

In 2025, the Clarkstown Fencing team won 1st place for Boys and Girls Foil and Girls Épée at Section One. The Boys Épée team won 2nd place at the same competition.

== Ram's Cave ==
In the spring of the 2010–2011 school year, the Ram's Cave was created at North. This is a small school store in the Main that sells snacks, beverages, and school spirit wear to all students in the afternoons. Members of the PTA volunteer to manage the store. In the fall of the 2012–2013 school year, the Ram's Cave was relocated and expanded into the library of the School.

== Notable alumni ==
- Bruce Altman (class of 1973), film and television actor
- Skylar Astin (class of 2005), actor, "Georg" in Tony Award-winning musical Spring Awakening, and "Jesse" in movie Pitch Perfect
- Keith Bulluck (class of 1995), former NFL linebacker
- Will Cunnane (class of 1992), Major League Baseball pitcher
- Jeremy Garelick (class of 1994), film director and writer
- Brittny Gastineau (class of 2000), model and television actress
- Mark Katz (class of 1982), speechwriter for President Bill Clinton
- Alan Kirschenbaum (class of 1979), television producer and writer
- Dana Marlowe, social entrepreneur, philanthropist, women rights activist and disability advocate
- Chris O'Grady, left-handed pitcher for the Miami Marlins
- Adam Rodríguez (class of 1993), film and television actor, known for role as Eric Delko on CSI: Miami
- Philip Rosenthal (class of 1977), writer and executive producer of sitcom Everybody Loves Raymond
- Ed Rubbert (class of 1982), former NFL and AFL quarterback
- Randi Weingarten (class of 1976), president of American Federation of Teachers (AFT), AFL–CIO, and former president of United Federation of Teachers
- Tracy Wolfson (class of 1993), sportscaster for CBS Sports
- Prince Emili (class of 2016), former football defensive tackle for the New Orleans Saints of the National Football League (NFL)
- Julie Buxbaum (class of 1995), author
