= Stephen Greene (artist) =

American painter

- Born: September 19, 1917
- Died: November 18, 1999 (aged 82)

Stephen Greene (September 19, 1917 – November 18, 1999) was an American artist known for his abstract paintings and in the 1940s his social realist figure paintings.

== Biography ==
Stephen Greene was born in New York City. He attended the National Academy School of Art and then the Art Students League, and earned a BFA and a MA at the University of Iowa in Iowa City. He studied with Philip Guston, and they remained friends until Guston's death in 1980.

Greene taught at Princeton University for many years where he was teacher to many well-known figures in the art world including Frank Stella and art critic and historian Michael Fried. Mr. Greene also taught for many years at the Tyler School of Art of Temple University. Greene had more than two dozen solo exhibitions of his work in leading art galleries in New York City. He also taught at the Art Students League of New York for several decades. After the mid-1950s and until his death Greene's mature work was related to abstract expressionism, color field painting and surrealism. His work is represented in numerous public collections, including the Museum of Modern Art, the Metropolitan Museum of Art, the Whitney Museum of American Art, the San Francisco Museum of Modern Art, the Brooklyn Museum, the Houston Museum of Fine Arts, the Solomon R. Guggenheim Museum, the Carnegie Museum of Art, and the Tate Gallery in London.

He died aged 82 in November 1999 at his home in Valley Cottage, New York, where he had lived for more than 40 years with his wife the novelist Sigrid de Lima (1921–1999), who died two months earlier. Their daughter, Alison de Lima Greene, is a curator at the Houston Museum of Fine Arts and has published a number of works on modern art.

== Work ==
“I have always wanted to achieve a profoundly moving image, to make of paint and canvas a visual fact worth dealing with on many levels. Art does set up a particular world and the one that suits my vision of what I see, know, deals with the dark side of experience as well as its enchantment and pleasures. In art, our hopes and desires shape our visions of fulfillment for more than the actual experiences that we may have. My use of color and light that is mysterious is of an interior perception. My formal stance is very much involved with an underlying structure that is insistent to the life of the work. I remain subject ridden and how a vertical divides the space from top to bottom, from my earliest works to the present, is as much subject matter as overt reference to the known world. I prefer to make paintings that are sufficiently individual to be granted their own place.”

— Stephen Greene, Valley Cottage, New York, 1999.

Stephen Greene, Vigil, 1962, Oil on canvas, 68 x 80 inches.

Stephen Greene, The Shadow, 1950, Oil on linen, 54 1/8 x 34 1/16 inches, at the Whitney Museum of American Art.

Stephen Greene, The Light of Memory No. 9, 1993, Oil on canvas.

== Selected solo exhibitions ==
- 2016: "Stephen Greene: 1960s Abstractions,” Jason McCoy Gallery, New York (March 3–April 30)
- 1999: "Stephen Greene: Recent Paintings,” University of Massachusetts, Lowell (October 1–November 3)
- 1997: "Stephen Greene: Images of Suffering & Salvation,” St. Louis Art Museum, St. Louis
- 1978: “Stephen Greene: A Decade of Painting,” Akron Art Institute, Akron (May 7–June 18); exhibition traveled to The Columbus Gallery of Fine Arts, Columbus; North Carolina Museum of Art, Raleigh; The Currier Gallery of Art, Manchester, New Hampshire.
- 1977: “Stephen Greene: Fermata,” Galeria Ponce, Mexico City, Mexico (August–September)
- 1975: “Stephen Greene,” Galleria Dell’Obelisco Rome, Italy
- 1974: "Stephen Greene, A Retrospective Exhibition of Works Produced from 1963 to 1973", Tyler School of Art, Temple University, Philadelphia (October 18-November 17)
- 1963: “Stephen Greene: A Retrospective Exhibition of Paintings and Drawings.” Corcoran Gallery of Art, Washington, D.C. (March); exhibition traveled to University of Minnesota, Kalamazoo Institute of Arts, Tennessee Fine Arts Center, Des Moines Art Center.

== Selected group exhibitions ==
2014: “Art in the Making: A New Adaptation,” Luther W. Brady Art Gallery, The George Washington University, Washington, DC (May 6–July 17); Reading Public Museum, Reading, PA (August 15–December 18).
2011: “Surface Truths: Abstract Painting of the ‘Sixties,” Norton Simon Museum of Art, Pasadena, CA (March 25–August 15)
2010: “Collecting Biennials,” The Whitney Museum of American Art, New York (January 16 – November 28)
2009: “The Lens and the Mirror: Modern Self-Portraits from the Collection,” The Metropolitan Museum of Art, New York (April–July 12, 2009)
“Abstraction from the Collection,” Pennsylvania Academy of the Fine Arts, Philadelphia (October 2–December 13, 2009)
2007: “The Abstract Impulse: Fifty Years of Abstraction at the National Academy, 1956-2006,” National Academy Museum and School of Fine Arts, New York (August 1, 2007 – January 6, 2008)
1997: “View From Abroad: American Realities,” Whitney Museum of American Art.
1995: “47th Annual American Academy Purchase Exhibition,” The American Academy of Arts and Letters, New York
1992: “Painting, Self-Evident Abstraction,” Spoleto, USA and The William Halsey Gallery, Simmons Center for the Arts, College of Charleston, Charleston, SC
1991: “American Life and American Art,” Whitney Museum of American Art, New York
“American Abstraction,” Addison Gallery of American Art, Phillips Academy, Andover, MA
1988: “Recent Acquisitions,” Neuberger Museum, Purchase, NY
1982: “Thirty-fourth Annual Hassam & Speicher Fund Purchase Exhibit,” American Academy of Arts and Letters, New York
“Distinct Visions: Expressionist Sensibilities, Elaine deKooning, Stephen Greene, Grace Hartigan,” Milton and Sally Avery Art Center, Bard College Annandale-on Hudson, NY
“Realism & Realities: The Other Side of American Painting,” Rutgers University Gallery, New Brunswick, NJ
1981: “Decade of Transition: 1940-50,” Whitney Museum of American Art, New York
“156th Annual Exhibition,” National Academy of Design, New York, NY
1979: “The Figurative Tradition,” The Whitney Museum of American Art, New York
1977: “American Postwar Painting,” Solomon R. Guggenheim Museum, New York
1975: “An American Dream World,” Whitney Museum of American Art, New York
1973: “Twenty Years of American Painting,” Solomon R. Guggenheim Museum, New York
“Biennial of Contemporary American Painting and Sculpture,” Whitney Museum of American Art, New York
1972: “Annual Exhibition,” Whitney Museum of American Art, New York
1970: “L’art vivant aux Etats Unis,” Fondation Maeght, Saint-Paul-de-Vence, France
1969: “American Paintings, Watercolors and Drawings from the Museum Collection,” Metropolitan Museum of Art, New York
“Seven Decades of American Painting,” Whitney Museum of American Art, New York
1967: “Annual Exhibition,” Whitney Museum of American Art, New York
1963: “Annual Exhibition,” Whitney Museum of American Art, New York
1962: "65th Annual American Exhibition,” Art Institute of Chicago, (January 5 – February 18, 1962)
“Abstract Drawings and Watercolors,” Museu de Arte Moderna, Rio de Janeiro, Brazil
1961: “Annual Exhibition,” Whitney Museum of American Art, New York
“Abstract Expressionists and Imagists,” Solomon R. Guggenheim Museum, New York
“VI São Paulo Bienal,” São Paulo, Brazil
1959: “Annual Exhibition,” Whitney Museum of American Art, New York
“Museum Director’s Choice,” Baltimore Museum of Art
1958: “Biennial of Religious Art,” Salzburger Museum, Carolino Augusteum
1957: “Annual Exhibition,” Whitney Museum of American Art, New York
“Annual Exhibition,” Los Angeles County Museum, Los Angeles
1956: “Annual Exhibition,” Whitney Museum of American Art, New York
“Recent Drawings USA,” Museum of Modern Art, New York
1955: “The New Decade: 35 American Painters and Sculptors,” Whitney Museum of American Art, New York
“Italy Rediscovered,” Munson Williams Proctor Institute, Utica
1954: “Annual Exhibition: Sculpture, Watercolor, Drawing,” Whitney Museum of American Art, New York
“Le Dessin Contemporarin au États Unis,” Musée National d’Art Moderne, Paris
“Reality and Fantasy,” Walker Art Center, Minneapolis
1952: “Annual Exhibition: Contemporary American Painting,” Whitney Museum of American Art, New York
“65th American Exhibition, The Art Institute of Chicago, Chicago
“Carnegie International,” Carnegie Institute, Pittsburgh
1951: “Annual Exhibition: Sculpture, Watercolor, Drawing,” Whitney Museum of American Art, New York
1950: “American Painting Today,” The Metropolitan Museum of Art, New York
“Annual Exhibition: Contemporary American Painting,” Whitney Museum of American Art, New York

== Monographic catalogues and exhibition brochures ==
- Ashton, Dore, Stephen Greene: A Retrospective Exhibition of Paintings and Drawings. Washington, D.C., Corcoran Gallery of Art, 1963
- Stephen Greene: A Decade of Painting, Akron: Akron Art Institute, 1978
- Ashton, Dore, et al., Stephen Greene: Recent Paintings, Lowell, MA: University Gallery at UMASS Lowell, 1999.
- Fyfe, Joseph and Stephanie Buhmann. Stephen Greene: Pleasure Dome. New York, NY: Jason McCoy, Inc., 2006.
- Pease, David et al. Stephen Greene, A Retrospective Exhibition of Works Produced from 1963 to 1973, Philadelphia: Tyler School of Art, Temple University, 1974
- Ponce, Juan García. Stephen Greene: Fermata. Mexico, DF, Galeria Ponce, 1977.
- Rose, Barbara. Stephen Greene: 25 Years of Drawing, New York: William Zierler, Inc., 1972
- Robert Storr, “The Light That Did Not Fail – A Source that Never Ran Dry,” and Marshall N. Price, “Between Narrative and Mystery,” Stephen Greene 1917-1999. New York: Jason McCoy Inc., 2008
- Wilkin, Karen. Stephen Greene, Edmonton, Alberta: Edmonton Art Gallery, 1972
- Stephen Greene: Painter and Mentor, Andover, MA: Addison Gallery of American Art, 2003
