= Nyack Public Schools =

School district in the U.S. state of New York

Address
- 13A Dickinson Avenue Nyack, New York, 10960; United States

District information
- Type: Public
- Grades: K–12
- NCES District ID: 3621480

Students and staff
- Students: 2,793
- Teachers: 266.05 (FTE)
- Staff: 208.0 (FTE)
- Student–teacher ratio: 10.5

Other information
- Website: www.nyackschools.org

Nyack Public Schools is a school district headquartered in the Town of Orangetown, New York, United States. It serves several areas in Orangetown and Clarkstown including the villages of Nyack, South Nyack, and Upper Nyack, Upper Grand View, and the hamlet of Valley Cottage. As of December 2004 the district had 2,881 students in all five schools.

== History ==
A February 1999 report released by a chapter of the National Association for the Advancement of Colored People and the Nyack Partners in Education stated that honors classes had nine times as many Euro-Americans as African Americans, while the district that Nyack is a part of had two Euro-Americans for one African Americans as a whole. This caused racial tension in the district.

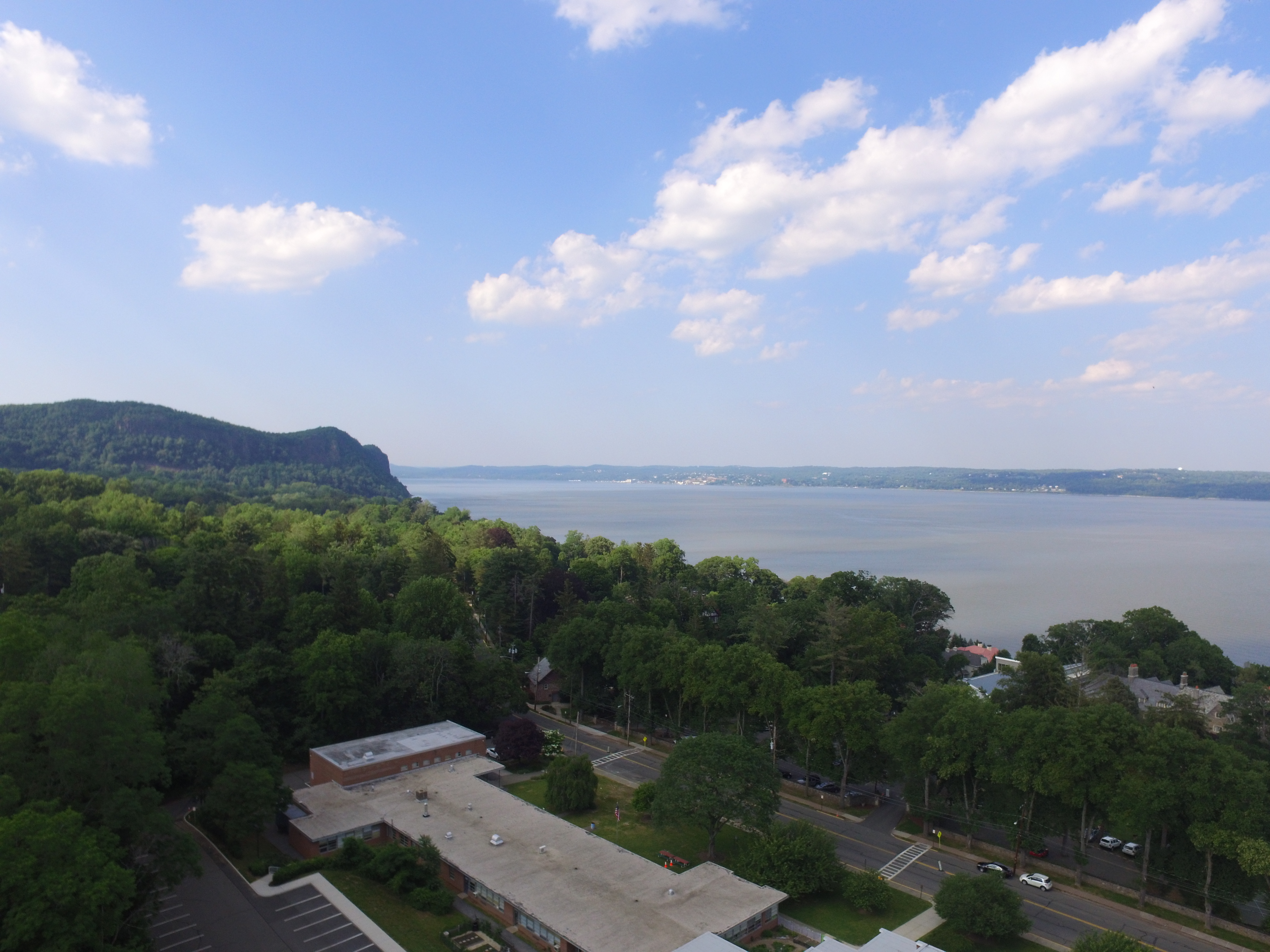
Aerial View of Upper Nyack Elementary School with Hudson River, March 2017

In 2001, Upper Nyack Elementary School, one of the three primary schools in the district, was the subject of "Kindergarten" an HBO documentary that explored the lives of 23 kindergarten students at the school in the 2001–2002 school year. The 13 part series was produced by Emmy winning producers Karen Goodman and Kirk Simon. Goodman said at the time she chose Upper Nyack Elementary School because she, "wanted a school that really could feel like it was anywhere."

== Schools ==
=== Secondary schools ===
- Nyack High School (Upper Nyack)
- Nyack Middle School (South Nyack)

=== Primary schools ===
Three elementary schools funnel into the middle school in Upper Nyack:

- Liberty Elementary School (previously known as Lake Road School) (Valley Cottage)
- Upper Nyack Elementary School (Upper Nyack),
- Valley Cottage Elementary School (Valley Cottage)

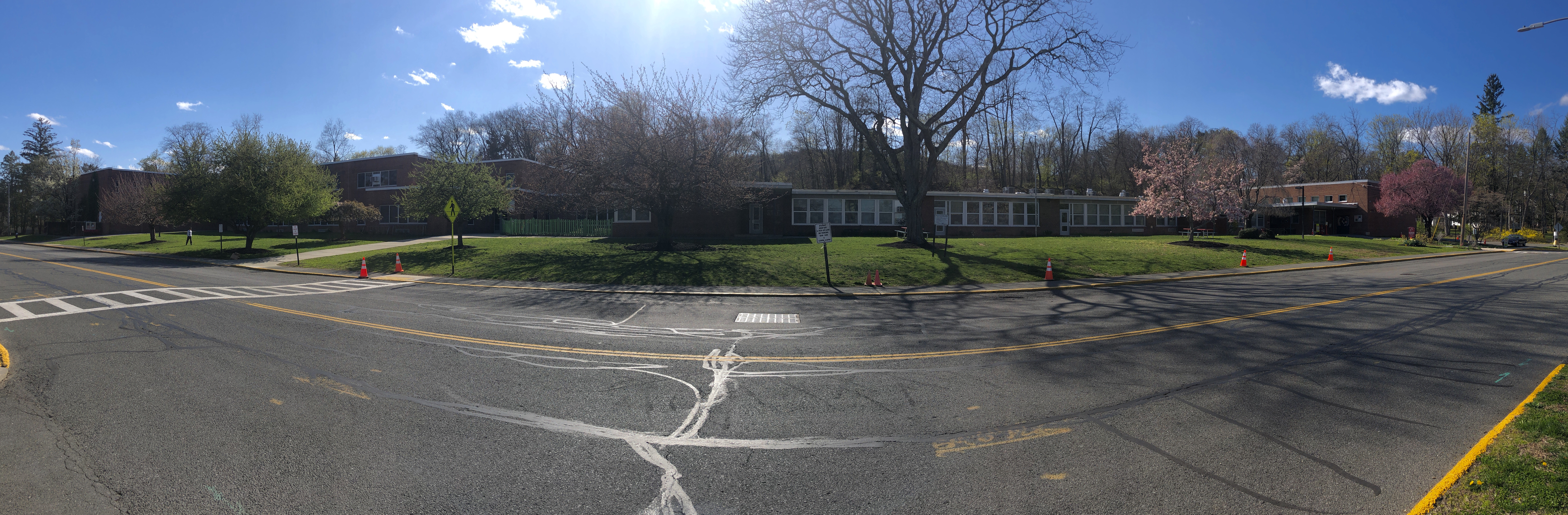
Upper Nyack Elementary School panorama, April 2020
