= Nyack High School =

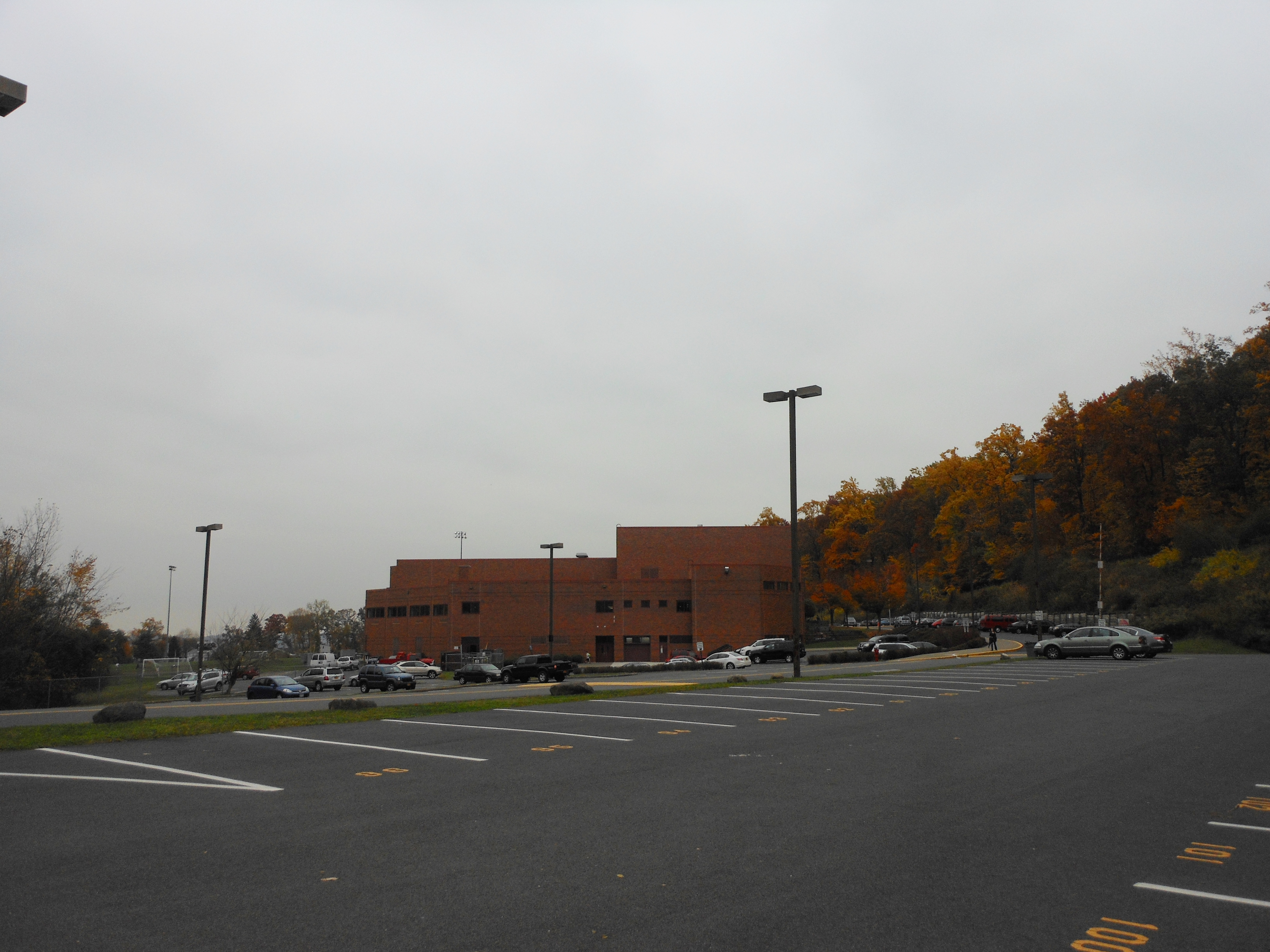
- Nyack High School building
- 360 Christian Herald Rd; Nyack, New York 10960; United States

Information
- Type: Public high school
- School district: Nyack Public Schools
- Principal: Nicole Saieva
- Teaching staff: 95.00 (FTE)
- Grades: 9–12
- Enrollment: 945 (2024-2025)
- Student to teacher ratio: 9.95
- Colors: Maroon; White
- Athletics conference: Section 1 (NYSPHSAA)
- Team name: Redhawks
- USNWR ranking: 2,243
- Newspaper: Nyack Spectrum
- Website: hs.nyackschools.org

Nyack High School is a secondary school in Nyack, New York, which serves parts of Orangetown and Clarkstown, New York. The original Nyack High School building is now part of BOCES. Since 1990, Nyack High School has been located less than a mile north of the old facility, at the corner of Christian Herald Road and Highland Avenue-(U.S. Route 9W).

Nyack High School is the sole high school in the Nyack Union Free School District in New York. Students come to the high school from Nyack Middle School, which gathers students from Upper Nyack, Liberty, Hilltop (now closed) and Valley Cottage elementary schools.

The high school is known for its academic performance with 94 percent of seniors taking the SAT in 2004, its football team, its theatrical productions and its music program.

In 1972, one of its school buses was involved in an accident getting struck by a Penn Central freight train, which killed five students and injured 46.

== Notable alumni ==
- Larry Abney, NBA player
- George Beim, former professional soccer player
- Roger Brown, NFL player
- Gloria Callen, backstroke swimmer
- Welles Crowther, worked in finance on the 104th floor of the South World Trade Center. Died on September 11 while saving at least eighteen lives. Also known as The Man in the Red Bandana
- Adam Deitch, drummer and producer
- Tyson Dupont, professional wrestler
- Firth Haring Fabend, novelist and historian
- Terrence Fede, former defensive end for the Miami Dolphins
- Rupert Holmes, composer, singer-songwriter, musician and author
- Edward Hopper, painter, 1899
- George Jakowenko, NFL player
- Elijah Reichlin-Melnick, former member of the New York State Senate
- Jimmy Ridlon, former NFL player; sports painter and sculptor
- Claudio Sanchez, lead singer of Coheed and Cambria
