= Valley Cottage, New York =

- Census-designated place
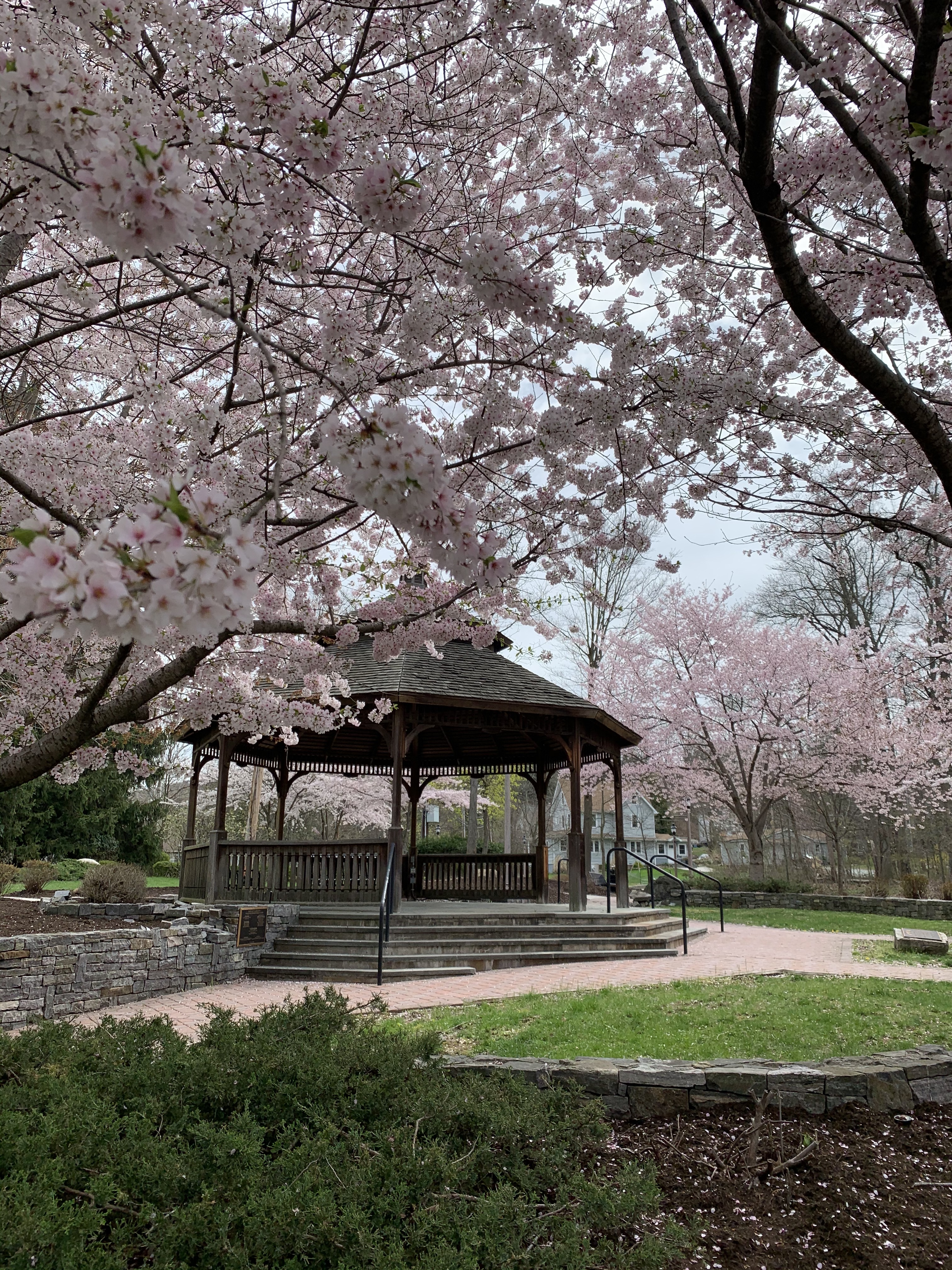
- Nickname: "Storms Corner"
- Location in Rockland County and the state of New York.

- Location within the state of New York
- Coordinates: 41°7′4″N 73°56′33″W
- Country: United States
- State: New York
- County: Rockland
- Town: Clarkstown

Area
  - Total: 4.57 sq mi (11.84 km^{2})
  - Land: 4.39 sq mi (11.37 km^{2})
  - Water: 0.18 sq mi (0.47 km^{2})
- Elevation: 177 ft (54 m)

Population (2020)
  - Total: 9,038
  - Density: 2,058.1/sq mi (794.64/km^{2})
- Time zone: UTC-5 (Eastern (EST))
  - Summer (DST): UTC-4 (EDT)
- ZIP code: 10989
- Area code: 845
- FIPS code: 36-76661
- GNIS feature ID: 0968357

Valley Cottage is a hamlet and census-designated place within Clarkstown, located in Rockland County, New York, United States. It is located northeast of West Nyack, northwest of Central Nyack, east of Bardonia, south of Congers, northwest of Nyack, and west of Upper Nyack. As of the 2020 census, Valley Cottage had a population of 9,038.

== Geography ==
Valley Cottage is located at 41°7′4″N 73°56′33″W (41.117862, −73.942531).

According to the United States Census Bureau, the CDP has a total area of 4.4 square miles (11 km^{2}), all land.

== Demographics ==
Historical population
Census	Pop.	Note	%±
2020	9,038		—
U.S. Decennial Census

At the census of 2000, there were 9,269 people, 3,347 households, and 2,379 families residing in the CDP. The population density was 2,168.7 inhabitants per square mile (837.3/km^{2}). There were 3,410 housing units at an average density of 797.9 per square mile (308.1/km^{2}). The racial makeup of the CDP was 82.16% white, 3.59% African American, 0.09% Native American, 9.81% Asian, 0.13% Pacific Islander, 1.89% from other races, and 2.34% from two or more races. Hispanic or Latino of any race were 6.71% of the population.

There were 3,347 households, out of which 30.4% had children under the age of 18 living with them, 60.3% were married couples living together, 8.0% had a female householder with no husband present, and 28.9% were non-families. Of all households, 23.8% were made up of individuals, and 6.6% had someone living alone who was 65 years of age or older. The average household size was 2.66 and the average family size was 3.2.

In the CDP, the age distribution of the population shows 20.9% under the age of 18, 6.5% from 18 to 24, 29.0% from 25 to 44, 28.8% from 45 to 64, and 14.7% who were 65 years of age or older. The median age was 41 years. For every 100 females, there were 91.7 males. For every 100 females age 18 and over, there were 87.5 males.

The median income for a household in the CDP was $75,828, and the median income for a family was $87,123. Males had a median income of $51,718 versus $41,653 for females. The per capita income for the CDP was $33,181. About 1.4% of families and 2.7% of the population were below the poverty line, including 2.5% of those under age 18 and 1.7% of those age 65 or over.

== History ==
The first known resident of Valley Cottage was John Ryder, who owned a large farm which comprised all or most of the area's school district.

The post office was first opened at the Valley Cottage Station in 1892.

According to George H. Burke's book Rockland County during the American Revolution, 1776–1781, Valley Cottage was once known as "Storm's Corner". In 1876, just before the opening of the West Shore Railroad station, the residents assembled at the school room agreed on the name "Valley Cottage", referring to the house nearest the station "that cottage in the valley". Another version has it that the name of the hamlet came about because of a famous trotting horse named "Cottage Maid", owned by Ed Green who owned the land where the station, the Marcus store and other buildings stood.

== Education ==
Blue Ribbon

Valley Cottage is a part of Nyack Union Free School District

- Valley Cottage Elementary School
- Liberty Elementary School is a Blue Ribbon Award winner (2000–2001) and semi-finalists (2004)
  - New York State winner of International Reading Award and ING Unsung Heroes Award (2004) for Karne Andreasen's "Turn on to Reading" program.
- Nyack Middle School
- Nyack High School

== Community ==
Valley Cottage has many schools, libraries, restaurants, and recreational opportunities. Valley Cottage also full of nature and is very accessible with many sidewalks.

=== Libraries ===
There are many libraries in and surrounding Valley Cottage. A few of them are: Valley Cottage Library, Nyack Library, and West Nyack Library.

=== Parks and recreation ===
- Twin Ponds Park – Massachusetts Avenue, 54 Sedge Rd
- Rockland Lake State Park – 299 Rockland Lake Rd
- Valley Cottage Hamlet Green – New Lake Rd
- Kings Park – 54, 34 Kings Hwy
- Wholeness Center – 7 New Lake Rd

== Transportation ==
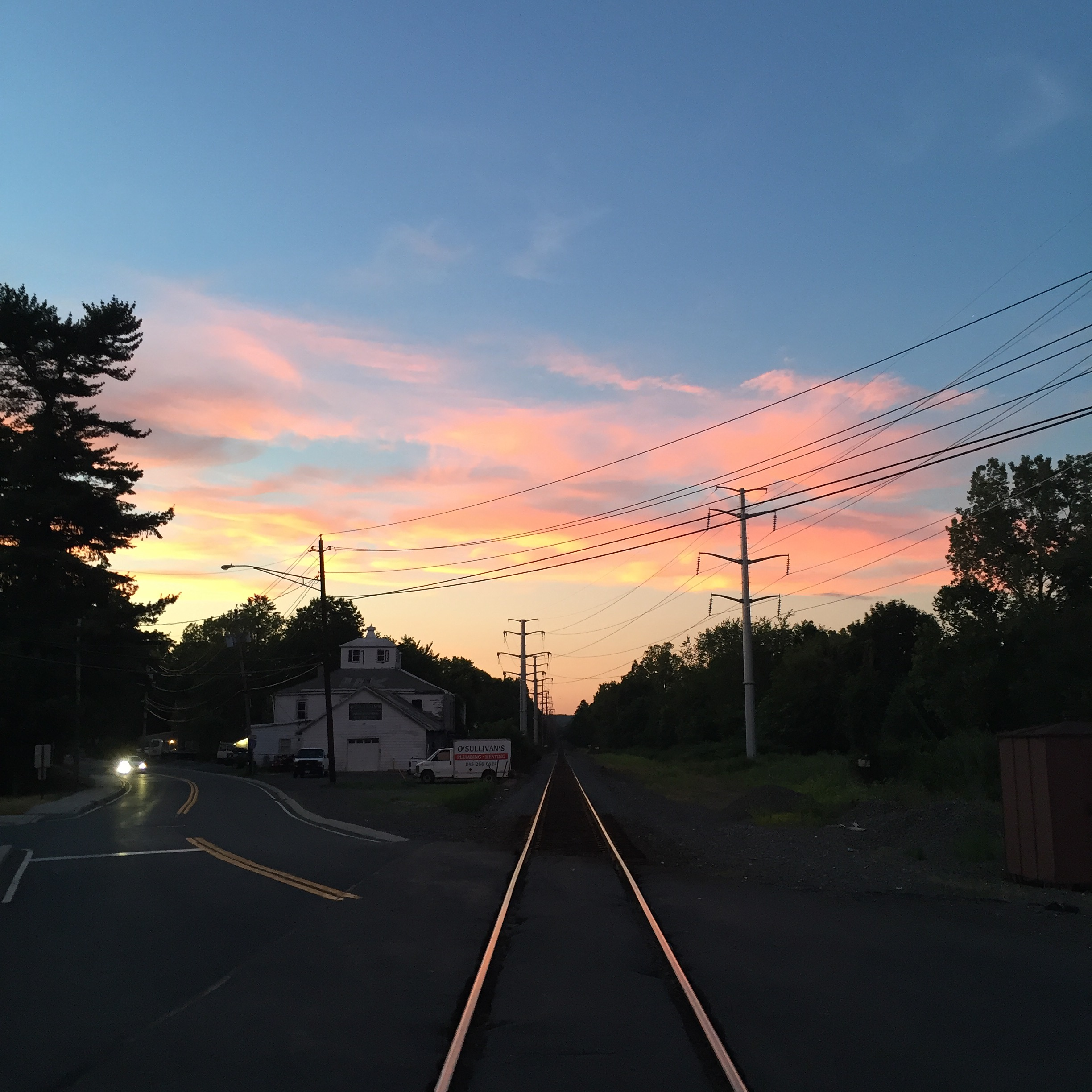
CSX River Line Tracks in Valley Cottage, crossing King's Highway/County Route 13

Valley Cottage's major thoroughfares are New York State Route 303, U.S. Route 9W, and Kings Highway.

Valley Cottage is located along CSX Transportation's River Line, with between 20 and 55 freight trains passing through the hamlet daily. Passenger service on the line ended in 1959. The nearest railroad stations to Valley Cottage with current passenger service are Nanuet 5.2 miles away and Tarrytown 10 miles away.

Commuter transportation to New York City is provided by Rockland Coaches Route 9A to the George Washington Bridge Bus Terminal and Route 9T to the Port Authority Bus Terminal from the bus shelters at the intersection of Lake Road and New York State Route 303. The shelters are a 0.4 mile walk from the hamlet's Park and Ride facility. Local bus transportation is operated by Transport of Rockland's Route 91 & 97 and Clarkstown Mini-Trans Route A.

== Tourism ==
=== Historical markers ===
Markers at Rockland Lake and Hook Mountain were unveiled on October 4, 2008.

=== Landmarks and places of interest ===
- The Josephine Hudson House belonged to the first woman to work in the Knickerbocker Ice Company.
- The Knickerbocker Ice Company was established in 1831. Rockland Lake was known to have had the cleanest and purest ice in the area. Knickerbocker's Ice House No. 3, located at Rockland Lake, could store more than 40,000 tons of ice harvested from the lake. The wooden storehouse's walls were insulated with sawdust to keep the ice blocks frozen until they were shipped in the summer. By 1834, the company owned a dozen steamboats and 75 ice barges, and employed about 3,000 to ship ice countrywide. The stored ice was placed on inclined railroad cars, transported down the mountainside, placed on barges on the Hudson River and shipped to New York City. So much ice was shipped that Rockland Lake became known as the "Icehouse of New York City". Knickerbocker burned down in 1926. Knickerbocker's Ice House No. 3 is currently a Clarkstown town historic site. Wells Fargo Home Mortgage recently pledged to help preserve the remaining walls. Only those walls and some scattered foundations from other icehouses remain. The Hanchar family who has deep roots in the hamlet, recently donated money for new markers at this site.
- Knickerbocker Fire House - established 1862
- Palisades Center bordering Valley Cottage from West Nyack side.
- Rockland Lake Community was a thriving community made up of the many workers at the Knickerbocker Ice Company.
- Rockland Lake State Park
- Storms Tavern - located on 407 Storms Road is believed to have been built in 1765 restored in 2008 located at the southwest corner of Casper Hill Road and Storms Road - an intersection important in Revolutionary and pre-Revolutionary times. This sandstone and frame house was built with its main entrance immediately abutting Casper Hill Road. Still standing is the large sandstone block on which passengers alighted from the stagecoach, which for many years made this point its first stop on the route north. A legend persists that George Washington was a patron and met with the Continental Army forces once quartered here, backed their horses down Casper Hill to confuse the oncoming British Army and the make their own escape. Half a century later the house had become a way station on the Underground Railroad by which runaway slaves escaped to the north. In October of 2025 Storms Tavern's owner, Tilcon New York Inc, generously donated Storms Tavern to the Clarkstown.
- Snyder Cemetery
  - The Garrabrants were a prominent, historic Dutch family who settled in the Hudson Valley in the late 1700s. In Valley Cottage, they are historically known as early pioneer farmers on "Garrabrant Mountain" and are best celebrated for their deep, five-generation legacy with the local volunteer fire department. The family originally settled in the area in the early 1800s. Early ancestors, like Pieter Gerrebrantse and his wife Margaret White. William Abraham Garrabrant (1867–1937), was born and lived in Valley Cottage. He served as a crucial bridge, maintaining the local land while becoming one of the founding members of the Valley Cottage Volunteer Fire Engine Company No 1. Edward R. Garrabrant (1899–1989): Born in Valley Cottage, Edward R. was the son of William Abraham. He represents the first generation of the family to rise to Fire Chief, serving terms in 1921–1922 and 1936–1937. Edward R.'s descendants and close kin continued this direct line. Edward C. Garrabrant (1930–2002) stepped into the Chief role in 1958, followed decades later by Keith E. Garrabrant in 1989, and eventually Kyle Garrabrant.
  - The Tremper family was a prominent, multi-generational pioneer and land-owning family in the hamlet of Valley Cottage, New York. With roots dating back to early Dutch and German settlers in the Hudson Valley, they shaped the rural, agricultural, and contracting landscape of Rockland County for over a century. Members of the Tremper family, like John Edward Tremper, raised families and participated in the growth of the community. Their historical presence spanned the transition of Valley Cottage from a landlocked farming settlement into a localized suburban hub, with branches of the family connecting to other notable families in the area, such as the Locke family.
  - The Locke family were a prominent, multi-generational local clan with deep roots in the area dating back to at least the late 19th century. Known for their civic contributions, local businesses, and deep local heritage, the Lockes were an established presence in Rockland County for decades.
- Tolstoy Foundation of Valley Cottage, founded in 1939 by Alexandra Lvovna Tolstoy, youngest daughter of Leo Tolstoy. Some of the Board members throughout the years included Sergei Rachmaninoff - composer & conductor, Igor Sikorsky - aviation pioneer in both helicopters and fixed-wing aircraft, Boris Bakhmeteff - engineer, professor of Civil Engineering at Columbia University and the only ambassador of the Russian Provisional Government to the United States, Boris Sergievsky - one of the most colorful of the early aviators.

== Religious institutions ==
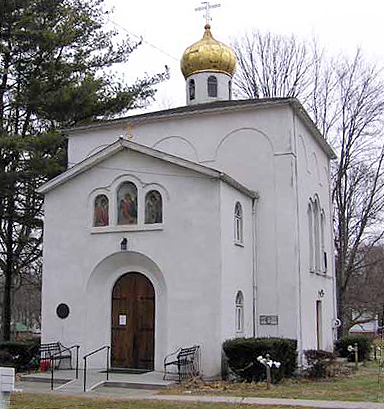
Russian: Temple of St. Sergius of Radonezh on the territory of the Tolstoy Foundation

- All Saints Church
- All Saints Episcopal – consecrated in 1922
- Elim Tabernacle Church
- Lake Avenue Chapel – torn down, abandoned cemetery
- Islamic Center of Rockland
- Methodist Church – which was located in Rockland Lake, torn down
- St. Mary's Indian Orthodox Church.
- St. Michael's Church – consecrated in 1901 and closed down in 1965 and torn down, however the Gethsemane Cemetery is still used
- St. Therese's Chapel – consecrated in 1927 and was located on Church Lane, closed down in 1965 and torn down
- Saint Paul's School
- Saint Sergius of Radonezh Russian Orthodox Church – consecrated in 1940

== Notable people of Valley Cottage ==
- Isaac Bonewits (1949–2012), American druid who published a number of influential books on neopaganism
- Stephen Greene (1917–1999), painter, who lived along with his wife, Sigrid de Lima (1921–1999), a novelist.
- Maurice Heaton (1900–1990), glass artist
- Rose Thompson Hovick (1890–1954), lived on Ridge Rd. She was the mother of two famous performing daughters: the burlesque artist Gypsy Rose Lee, and the actress June Havoc.
- Jack Klugman (1922–2012), actor, stated in the Rockland County Journal newspaper, that he lived on Kings Highway in Valley Cottage.
- Audrey Landers (born 1956), actress, who grew up on Sherry Drive
- Judy Landers (born 1958) actress, along with her sister grew up on Sherry Drive
- Robert Maclay, president of the Knickerbocker Ice Company, late 1800s - early 1900s.
- Megan Leavey, Marine corporal who served in Iraq as a Military Police K9 handler.
- Mitch Miller (1911–2010), musician, singer, conductor, record producer, record company executive.
- Princess Vera Constantinovna of Russia, the youngest child of Grand Duke Constantine Constantinovich of Russia and his wife Grand Duchess Elizabeth Mavrikievna.
- Vladimir Nikolayevich Petrov, professor at Yale University and an academic, POW.
- Ismael Quintana (1937–2016), Puerto Rican singer and composer of music
- Claudio Sanchez, of the well-known band Coheed & Cambria, uses Valley Cottage for much of his side project, The Prize Fighter Inferno. Sanchez is originally from nearby Nyack.
- Anita Shreve, writer, novelist and editor, lived in the 1980s.
- Olga Spessivtseva (1895–1991), ballerina, one of the outstanding classical ballerinas of the 20th century.
- Kim Stanley, actress, primarily in television and theatre, in later years a teacher.
- William Styron (1925–2006), writer, lived for a year while writing his acclaimed first novel Lie Down in Darkness.
- Harvey Swados, novelist and writer, wrote his first published novel, Out Went the Candle.
- Alexandra Tolstaya, daughter of the Russian author Leo Tolstoy, was a resident of the town in later life, organized the Tolstoy Foundation Center, of which President Herbert Hoover was the First Honorary Chairman during the years 1939–1964. Aleksandr Solzhenitsyn spent many of his first few summer months after emigrating to United States here.
- Kristi Zea (born 1948), production designer, costume designer, producer.
