= George Jakowenko =

American football player (born 1948)

No. 5
- Position: Kicker

Personal information
- Born: June 26, 1948 (age 78); Charleroi, Belgium
- Listed height: 5 ft 9 in (1.75 m)
- Listed weight: 175 lb (79 kg)

Career information
- High school: Nyack (Nyack, New York, U.S.)
- College: Syracuse
- NFL draft: 1971: undrafted

Career history
- St. Louis Cardinals (1971)*; Oakland Raiders (1974); Buffalo Bills (1976)
- * Offseason or practice squad member only
- Stats at Pro Football Reference

George Jakowenko (born June 26, 1948) is a former American football placekicker who played in the National Football League. He was active for two seasons, once for the Oakland Raiders in 1974, and once for the Buffalo Bills in 1976. He was the first Bill to wear the number 5.
