= Maurice Heaton =

Swiss-born American glass artist (1900–1990)

- Born: 1900; Neuchâtel, Switzerland
- Died: April 6, 1990 (aged 89–90); Valley Cottage, New York, U.S.
- Education: Stevens Institute of Technology
- Years active: 1923–1990
- Known for: Glass artist
- Movement: Studio glass movement, Art Deco

Maurice Heaton (1900–1990) was a Swiss-born American glass artist, of English ancestry. His glass work ranged in subject, and included work in window hangings, murals, lighting fixtures, and tableware. For most of his life he lived in the hamlet of Valley Cottage in Rockland County, New York, U.S..

In 1985, Heaton was elected as a fellow of the American Craft Council (ACC).

== Biography ==
Maurice Heaton was born in 1900 in Neuchâtel, Switzerland, to English parents. His father and grandfather were glass artists. In 1914 during World War I, his family moved to New York state, and by 1919 the family settled in Valley Cottage, New York which was a rural area at the time.

Heaton attended the Stevens Institute of Technology in Hoboken, New Jersey, where he studied engineering. After leaving college he worked under his father Clement Heaton, as a stained-glass artist assistant.

He had invented a process in 1947 for creating glassware in the studio furnace, and was later part of the 1960s studio glass movement. His glass studio was in Valley Cottage, New York; it experienced three major fires in 1974, in 1981, and the last fire being in 1988. It took him a year and a half to rebuild his glass studio after the 1988 fire, shortly before his death on April 6, 1990.

Heaton's artwork can be found in museum collections, including at the Brooklyn Museum, the Metropolitan Museum of Art, Museum of Arts and Design, the Corning Museum of Glass, the Art Institute of Chicago, and the Smithsonian American Art Museum.
