= Agnes de Lima =

American journalist and writer on education

- Born: 1887; Hollywood, New Jersey
- Died: 27 October 1974 (aged 86–87); Woodcliff Lake, New Jersey
- Education: Vassar College; Columbia University School of Social Work
- Occupations: Journalist, writer, reformer
- Children: Sigrid de Lima (1921–1999)

Agnes de Lima (1887–1974) was an American journalist and writer on education, and a Progressive Era reformer.

== Life ==
Agnes de Lima was born in Hollywood, New Jersey, in 1887, and she grew up in Larchmont, New York, and New York City. Her family had emigrated from Curaçao and had become successful in banking, and they held conservative values.

In 1904, de Lima entered Vassar College, a liberal arts school, and majored in English. It was here that she became aware of the liberal reformist thinking of the Progressive Era. While in Vassar, she campaigned to raise the wages of maids and drifted away from her family’s conservative beliefs and became active in many reform movements such as education and feminism.

After graduating, she worked as a writer for the Russell Sage Foundation and the Bureau of Municipal Research. She also continued her education and received a master's degree in 1912 from the New York School of Social Work (now part of Columbia University).

In 1918, de Lima became the lead writer on education for The New Republic and Nation journal. She wrote many articles on Progressive education. In 1924 she collected these articles into a book titled Our Enemy the Child. This book described the Progressive classroom and has since been cited by many scholars in educational history.

De Lima continued to collaborate with Progressive schools and their teachers and publish more books. In 1939 she produced A School for the World of Tomorrow, Democracy’s High School in 1941, South of the Rio Grande: An Experiment in International Understanding in 1942, and The Little Red Schoolhouse in 1942 featuring an introduction by Progressive educator John Dewey.

De Lima took the position of director of public relations for the New School for Social Research in New York City from 1940 to 1960 making her the de facto school historian. She retired in 1960 and lived in Greenwich Village, New York.

She died November 27, 1974, at Woodcliff Lake Manor, Woodcliff Lake, New Jersey, at 87 years of age. She was survived by her daughter, Sigrid de Lima, and granddaughter.
