= Mark Katz (speechwriter) =

Mark Katz (born December 28, 1963) is an American humorist, speechwriter, author, and humor consultant to politicians, executives and media personalities.

== Early life and education ==
Mark Katz was born in Brooklyn, New York and raised in Rockland County, New York. Katz attended Clarkstown High School North in New City, New York. The son of an orthodontist, he received a B.A. in Government at Cornell University in 1986. On January 25, 1984, he appeared on the "Stupid Pet Tricks" segment of the Late Show with David Letterman, with Wally, his piano-playing toy poodle.

== Career ==
Katz began his career in journalism, working as a news clerk in the Washington bureau of the New York Times. He then worked in politics, serving as a special assistant to U.S. Senator Daniel Patrick Moynihan, then on the “rapid response team” of the Michael Dukakis presidential campaign of 1988. Katz moved from there to work as an advertising copywriter at Weber Shandwick.

From 1993 to 2000, he was a creative consultant to the Democratic National Committee, assisting then-President Bill Clinton with his annual series of humorous speeches to the Washington Press Corps. These speeches were given at, among other places, the White House Correspondents' Association, the Gridiron Club, and the Alfalfa Club. Katz has also written humorous speeches for then-Vice President Al Gore, James Wolfensohn of the World Bank, Madeleine Albright, Tom Freston, and Barbra Streisand.

Katz’s humorous essays have been published in Time, The New Yorker, The Washington Post, and Washington Monthly; he is also an occasional op-ed contributor to The New York Times. He has published two books, including one on his experience as the in-house humorist of the Clinton White House. He has appeared on NPR’s Fresh Air and the stage of the HBO Aspen Comedy Festival. He is also a frequent storyteller at The Moth, a popular storyteller’s forum based in New York City. He is credited with suggesting the name for the NPR show Wait Wait ... Don't Tell Me! while trying out as a very early panelist.

=== The Soundbite Institute ===
Drawing upon his unusual combination of skills in humor, speechwriting, corporate and strategic communications, Mark Katz started The Soundbite Institute in 1993. The Soundbite Institute is a unique creative consulting boutique that applies comic sensibilities to strategic communications for a roster of corporate and political leaders and other high-profile individuals.

== Bibliography ==
- "I AM NOT A CORPSE!" & Other Quotes Never Actually Said (Dell) 978-0440507123
- 2004 CLINTON & ME: A Real-Life Political Comedy (Miramax Books) 978-0786869497
