= Keith Bulluck =

American football player (born 1977)

No. 53
- Position: Linebacker

Personal information
- Born: April 4, 1977 (age 49); Suffern, New York, U.S.
- Listed height: 6 ft 3 in (1.91 m)
- Listed weight: 235 lb (107 kg)

Career information
- High school: Clarkstown North (New City, New York)
- College: Syracuse
- NFL draft: 2000: 1st round, 30th overall pick

Career history
- Tennessee Titans (2000–2009); New York Giants (2010)

Awards and highlights
- 2× First-team All-Pro (2003, 2007); Second-team All-Pro (2002); Pro Bowl (2003); NFL combined tackles co-leader (2004); Third-team All-American (1999); First-team All-Big East (1999); Second-team All-Big East (1998)

Career NFL statistics
- Total tackles: 1,088
- Sacks: 18
- Forced fumbles: 15
- Fumble recoveries: 13
- Interceptions: 21
- Defensive touchdowns: 6
- Stats at Pro Football Reference

Keith J. Bulluck (born April 4, 1977) is an American former professional football player who was a linebacker for eleven seasons in the National Football League (NFL). After playing college football for the Syracuse Orange, he was selected by the Tennessee Titans in the first round in the 2000 NFL draft. He had a ten-year career with the Titans, which included a Pro Bowl selection in 2003. He played for the New York Giants in 2010.

== Early life ==
At Clarkstown High School North in New City, New York, Bulluck was named first-team All County, first-team All-State, Blue-Chip All-American, and both Prep Football Report and Super Prep All-Northeast. Like many children in the New York metropolitan area in the 1980s and early 1990s, he idolized Giants linebacker Lawrence Taylor while growing up. He was also an All-County in basketball as a junior. On April 27, 2009, Bulluck's high school jersey, #1, was retired in a ceremony held at the high school. He also has a name plaque at Clarkstown High School North hung up on the "Hall of Fame".

== College career ==
Bulluck attended Syracuse University, where he played for the Syracuse Orange football team from 1996 to 1999. He played strong safety, outside linebacker and middle linebacker. As a senior in 1999 he led the Big East in tackles with 138 and received the Bill Horr Award, which is given to Syracuse's most valuable player. He finished his career with 375 tackles, six quarterback sacks, three interceptions, three forced fumbles and six fumble recoveries.

== Professional career ==
Pre-draft measurables
Height	Weight	Arm length	Hand span	40-yard dash	20-yard shuttle	Three-cone drill	Vertical jump	Broad jump
6 ft 3 in (1.91 m)	244 lb (111 kg)	33 1/2 in (0.85 m)	10 3/4 in (0.27 m)	4.47 s	4.13 s	7.33 s	38 in (0.97 m)	9 ft 11 in (3.02 m)
All values from NFL Combine

=== Tennessee Titans ===
The Tennessee Titans selected Bulluck in the first round (30th overall) of the 2000 NFL draft. Bulluck was the fifth linebacker drafted in 2000 and was one of four Pro Bowl linebackers selected in the first round of the 2000 NFL Draft. The first round also included Pro Bowl linebackers LaVar Arrington (2nd overall), Brian Urlacher (9th overall), and Julian Peterson (16th overall).

On July 1, 2000, the Tennessee Titans signed Bulluck to a four-year, $5.56 million contract that includes a signing bonus of $1.92 million.

After spending his first two seasons as a backup and special teamer, he became a starter in 2002. After becoming a starter he made a Pro Bowl in 2003 and has led the Titans in tackles five times. In 2004, he led the NFL in tackles with 152. In 2007, he recorded a Titans-record five interceptions for a linebacker.

=== New York Giants ===
On July 24, 2010, after a private workout with the team, he signed a one-year, $2.5 million contract with the Giants. He became an unrestricted free agent following the season.

=== Retirement ===
Bulluck did not play in the 2011 season after no teams signed him. After having the year off, he announced his retirement on January 25, 2012. On August 3, 2012, Bulluck formally retired from the National Football League with the team who drafted him, the Tennessee Titans. He became the first player in Titans franchise history to formally retire from their organization.

Bulluck joined the Titans broadcast team in Summer 2013. On August 25, 2013, Bulluck was arrested in Nashville, Tennessee, for allegedly robbing a taxi driver, although the claims by the taxi driver are disputed. On September 13, 2013, charges were dropped.

== NFL career statistics ==
Year	Team	GP	Tackles				Fumbles			Interceptions					
Year	Team	GP	Cmb	Solo	Ast	Sck	FF	FR	Yds	Int	Yds	Avg	Lng	TD	PD
2000	TEN	16	18	10	8	0.0	1	0	0	1	8	8	8	1	1
2001	TEN	15	51	30	21	1.0	0	2	0	2	21	10.5	21	0	5
2002	TEN	16	125	99	26	1.0	3	2	0	1	5	5.0	5	0	7
2003	TEN	16	135	104	31	3.0	5	2	0	2	9	4.5	9	0	6
2004	TEN	16	152	100	52	5.0	1	1	0	2	25	12.5	25	0	13
2005	TEN	16	138	102	36	5.0	1	1	0	2	16	8.0	16	0	9
2006	TEN	16	144	100	44	2.5	2	1	0	1	0	0.0	0	0	7
2007	TEN	16	88	68	20	0.0	1	1	0	5	63	12.6	35	0	7
2008	TEN	16	98	75	23	0.5	1	1	0	0	0	0.0	0	0	6
2009	TEN	14	108	81	27	0.0	0	1	0	3	45	15.0	23	0	7
2010	NYG	13	31	21	10	0.0	0	1	10	2	7	3.5	6	0	2
Career		170	1,088	790	298	18.0	15	13	0	21	199	9.5	35	1	70

== Curling ==
Since retirement from professional football, Keith has picked up the sport of curling. In March 2018 Jared Allen formed a team of all retired NFL players, consisting of Bulluck, Marc Bulger and Michael Roos with the goal of representing the United States at the 2022 Winter Olympics. They have since played together in the 2019 USA Men's Challenge Round (qualification event for the United States Men's Curling Championship) and Ed Werenich Golden Wrench Classic (a World Curling Tour event), going winless in both events.

== The Outside Game ==
In 2019 Bulluck partnered with the founders of the then 10-year-old conference series and sports media outlet "Blogs With Balls" to rebrand and relaunch under the umbrella "The Outside Game." Bulluck said in an announcement "The Outside Game was built to provide avenues that amplify conversation among athletes, creators, media, business, and marketers in an unfiltered and unbiased manner, just as BWB has for the past decade. The Outside Game gives athletes and contributors a real opportunity to address issues not exclusive to sport, and with a genuine voice and point of view rather than through the lens of corporate PR avenues." The first event under the rebrand was held September 5, 2019, at SubCulture in New York City and featured conversations with athletes PacMan Jones, Robin Lehner, Joanna Lohman, Alex Cavallini, and Jonathan Casillas, and media figures such as Greg Mescall, Erin Ashley Simon, Jeff Eisenband, Bleacher Report's Ben Osborne, and more.

In addition to the events, Bulluck co-hosts The Outside Game Podcast which is a mix of conversation and interviews with individuals from across sports and culture.

== Just Love Cafe ==
In 2020, Bulluck opened Just Love Coffee Cafe in Franklin, Tennessee. He aims to help under-privileged and poor youth. He has partnered with the Big Brothers Big Sister of Middle Tennessee non-profit organization on multiple occasions, mentoring youth in the art of responsibility, life choices, and of course sports.
