= Prince Emili =

American football player (born 1998)

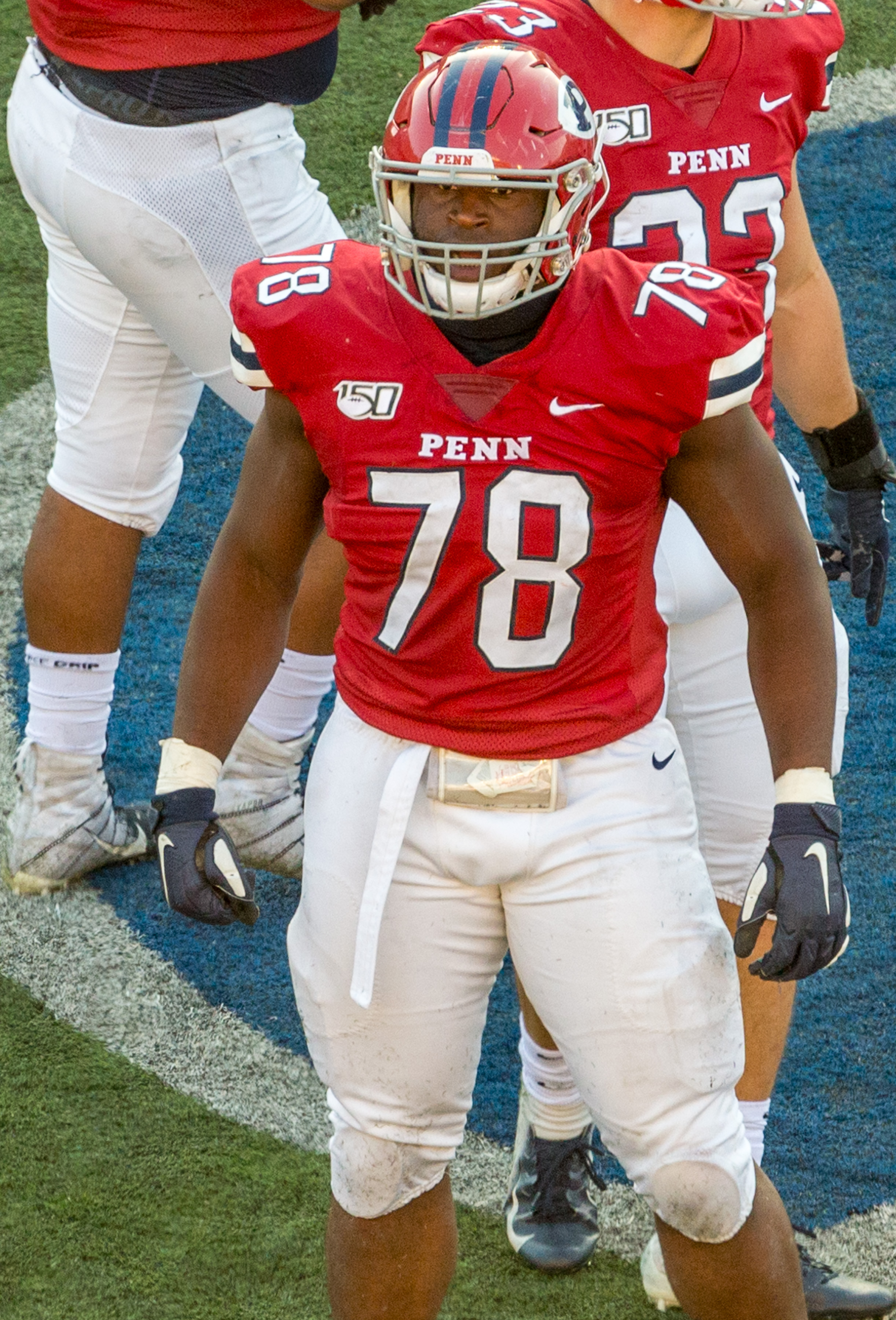
- Emili with the Penn Quakers in 2019

Profile
- Position: Defensive tackle

Personal information
- Born: September 18, 1998 (age 28); New York City, New York, U.S.
- Listed height: 6 ft 1 in (1.85 m)
- Listed weight: 295 lb (134 kg)

Career information
- High school: Clarkstown North (NY)
- College: Penn (2016–2021)
- NFL draft: 2022: undrafted

Career history
- Buffalo Bills (2022); New Orleans Saints (2022–2023)*; San Antonio Brahmas (2024); Atlanta Falcons (2024)*; San Antonio Brahmas (2025)
- * Offseason or practice squad member only

Career NFL statistics
- Total tackles: 3
- Pass deflections: 1
- Stats at Pro Football Reference

Okechukwu Prince Emili (born September 18, 1998) is an American professional football defensive tackle. He played college football at Penn.

== Professional career ==
Pre-draft measurables
| Height | Weight | Arm length | Hand span | 40-yard dash | 10-yard split | 20-yard split | 20-yard shuttle | Three-cone drill | Vertical jump | Broad jump | Bench press |
|---|---|---|---|---|---|---|---|---|---|---|---|
| 6 ft 0 5/8 in (1.84 m) | 295 lb (134 kg) | 32 5/8 in (0.83 m) | 9 1/8 in (0.23 m) | 5.12 s | 1.56 s | 3.00 s | 4.50 s | 7.58 s | 36.5 in (0.93 m) | 9 ft 5 in (2.87 m) | 28 reps |
All values from Pro Day

=== Buffalo Bills ===
Emili was signed by the Buffalo Bills on May 2, 2022, as an undrafted free agent. He was waived on August 30, 2022, and re-signed to the practice squad on September 14. He was promoted to the active roster on September 24, then waived and re-signed back to the practice squad on September 28. He was released on October 4.

=== New Orleans Saints ===
On November 16, 2022, Emili was signed to the New Orleans Saints' practice squad. He signed a reserve/future contract on January 9, 2023. He was waived on August 29, 2023.

=== San Antonio Brahmas ===
On December 20, 2023, Emili signed with the San Antonio Brahmas of the XFL. He had his contract terminated by the team on June 19, 2024 to sign with an NFL team.

=== Atlanta Falcons ===
On June 20, 2024, Emili signed with the Atlanta Falcons. He was released on August 27 as part of final roster cuts.

=== San Antonio Brahmas ===
On January 22, 2025, Emili re-signed with the Brahmas.

=== Columbus Aviators ===
On January 13, 2026, Emili was selected by the Columbus Aviators in the 2026 UFL Draft.
