= Terneur-Hutton House =

Historic house in New York, United States

- U.S. National Register of Historic Places
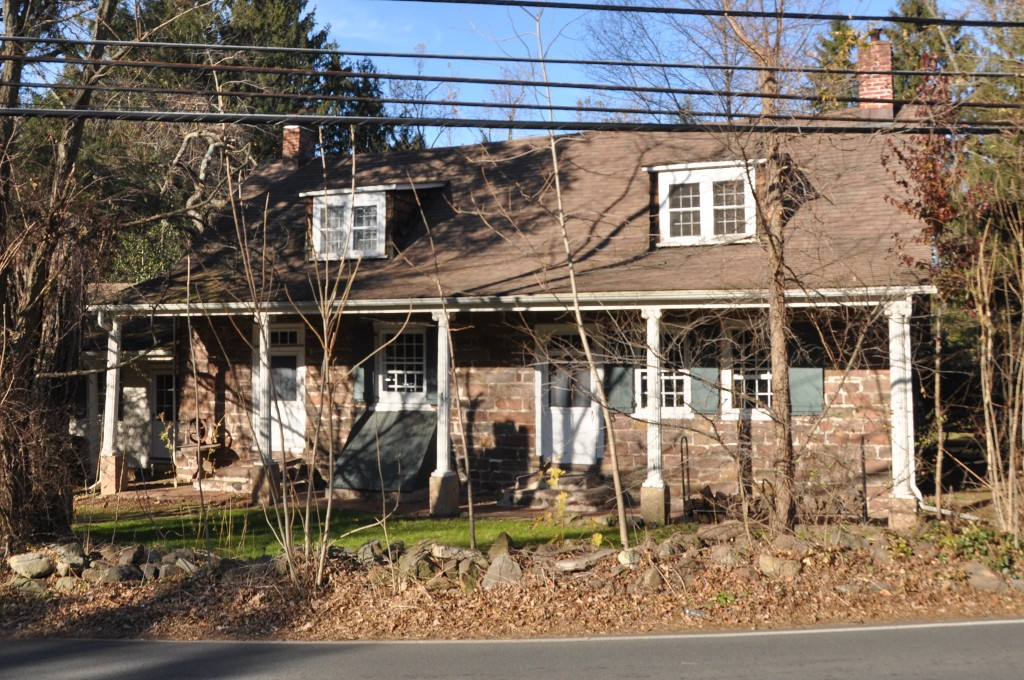

- Location within New York Location within the United States
- Location: 160 Sickelton Rd., West Nyack, New York
- Coordinates: 41°4′58″N 73°58′23″W
- Area: 1.3 acres (0.53 ha)
- Built: c. 1731
- Architect: Terneur, Henry
- Architectural style: Colonial, Dutch Colonial
- NRHP reference No.: 73001263
- Added to NRHP: April 23, 1973

Terneur-Hutton House is a historic home located at West Nyack in Rockland County, New York. It was built about 1731 and is a 1 1/2-story dwelling in the Dutch Colonial style. The first floor is constructed of sandstone, with painted shingles above.

It was listed on the National Register of Historic Places in 1976.
