= West Nyack, New York =

- Census-designated place
- Location in Rockland County and the state of New York.

- Location within the state of New York
- Coordinates: 41°5′28″N 73°58′8″W
- Country: United States
- State: New York
- County: Rockland
- Town: Clarkstown

Area
  - Total: 2.95 sq mi (7.65 km^{2})
  - Land: 2.92 sq mi (7.57 km^{2})
  - Water: 0.031 sq mi (0.08 km^{2})
- Elevation: 79 ft (24 m)

Population (2020)
  - Total: 3,649
  - Density: 1,250/sq mi (482/km^{2})
- Time zone: UTC-5 (Eastern (EST))
  - Summer (DST): UTC-4 (EDT)
- ZIP code: 10994
- Area code: 845
- FIPS code: 36-80599
- GNIS feature ID: 0970831

West Nyack (pronounced /ˈnaɪæk/) is a hamlet and census-designated place in the town of Clarkstown, New York, United States. It is located north of Blauvelt, east of Nanuet, southwest of Valley Cottage, southeast of Bardonia, and west of Central Nyack. It is approximately 18 miles (29 km) north of New York City. As of the 2020 census, West Nyack had a population of 3,649.

== History ==
The hamlet was originally known as Clarksville and subsequently MontMoor. It was subsequently merged with the small village located adjacent to the West Shore Railroad station where the Nyack Water Works were also located and became known as West Nyack in 1891.

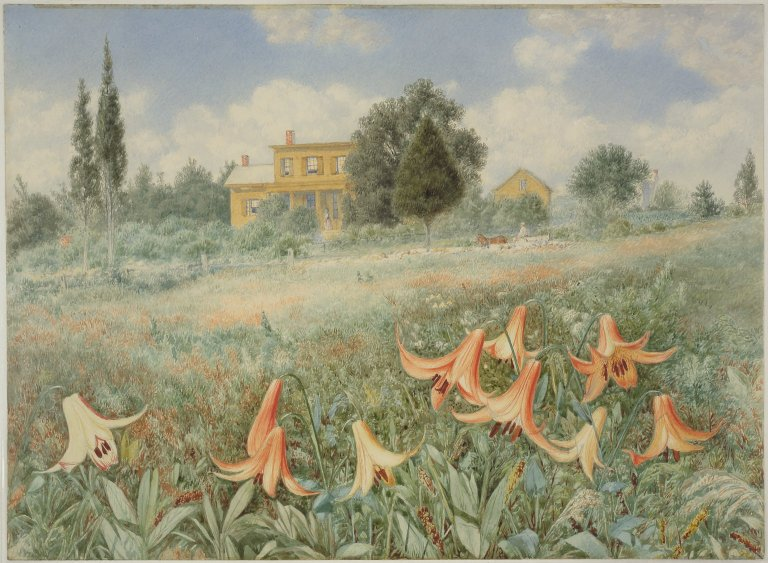
West Nyack - John William Hill (Brooklyn Museum)

== Geography ==
West Nyack is located at 41°5′28″N 73°58′8″W (41.091096, -73.968785).

According to the United States Census Bureau, the CDP has a total area of 2.9 square miles (7.5 km^{2}), all land.

== Demographics ==
Historical population
Census	Pop.	Note	%±
2020	3,649		—
U.S. Decennial Census

=== 2020 census ===
As of the 2020 census, West Nyack had a population of 3,649. The median age was 44.9 years. 21.4% of residents were under the age of 18 and 22.1% of residents were 65 years of age or older. For every 100 females there were 93.4 males, and for every 100 females age 18 and over there were 89.6 males age 18 and over.

100.0% of residents lived in urban areas, while 0.0% lived in rural areas.

There were 1,213 households in West Nyack, of which 35.7% had children under the age of 18 living in them. Of all households, 65.3% were married-couple households, 11.5% were households with a male householder and no spouse or partner present, and 20.4% were households with a female householder and no spouse or partner present. About 19.2% of all households were made up of individuals and 11.7% had someone living alone who was 65 years of age or older.

There were 1,267 housing units, of which 4.3% were vacant. The homeowner vacancy rate was 1.3% and the rental vacancy rate was 2.3%.

Racial composition as of the 2020 census
Race	Number	Percent
White	2,471	67.7%
Black or African American	148	4.1%
American Indian and Alaska Native	7	0.2%
Asian	403	11.0%
Native Hawaiian and Other Pacific Islander	1	0.0%
Some other race	268	7.3%
Two or more races	351	9.6%
Hispanic or Latino (of any race)	581	15.9%

=== 2000 census ===
As of the 2000 census, there were 3,282 people, 1,107 households, and 892 families residing in the CDP. The population density was 1,125.9 inhabitants per square mile (434.7/km^{2}). There were 1,132 housing units at an average density of 388.3 per square mile (149.9/km^{2}). The racial makeup of the CDP was 88.03% White, 1.98% African American, 0.03% Native American, 7.59% Asian, 0.98% from other races, and 1.40% from two or more races. Hispanic or Latino of any race were 5.58% of the population.

There were 1,107 households, out of which 36.7% had children under the age of 18 living with them, 70.8% were married couples living together, 6.9% had a female householder with no husband present, and 19.4% were non-families. 14.2% of all households were made up of individuals, and 6.1% had someone living alone who was 65 years of age or older. The average household size was 2.95 and the average family size was 3.27.

In the CDP, the population was spread out, with 23.8% under the age of 18, 5.7% from 18 to 24, 29.2% from 25 to 44, 27.5% from 45 to 64, and 13.8% who were 65 years of age or older. The median age was 40 years. For every 100 females, there were 93.9 males. For every 100 females age 18 and over, there were 91.9 males.

The median income for a household in the CDP was $98,931, and the median income for a family was $106,576. Males had a median income of $67,326 versus $41,518 for females. The per capita income for the CDP was $40,178. About 1.0% of families and 2.6% of the population were below the poverty line, including 1.3% of those under age 18 and 5.2% of those age 65 or over.

== Education ==
Blue Ribbon

- Strawtown Elementary School became a Blue Ribbon Award winner in 2007. This is the second school in Rockland County to win this award.
- West Nyack Elementary School is located in West Nyack.
- Clarkstown High School South is located in West Nyack.
- Felix Festa Middle School is also located in West Nyack.

== Transportation ==
West Nyack is located along the New York State Thruway, at the Exit 12 interchange. Other major thoroughfares in West Nyack are New York State Route 303 and New York State Route 59. The Palisades Interstate Parkway is located at the western edge of the hamlet.

West Nyack is located along CSX Transportation's River Line, with 20 to 55 freight trains passing through the hamlet daily. Passenger service ended on the line in 1959.

== Landmarks and places of interest ==
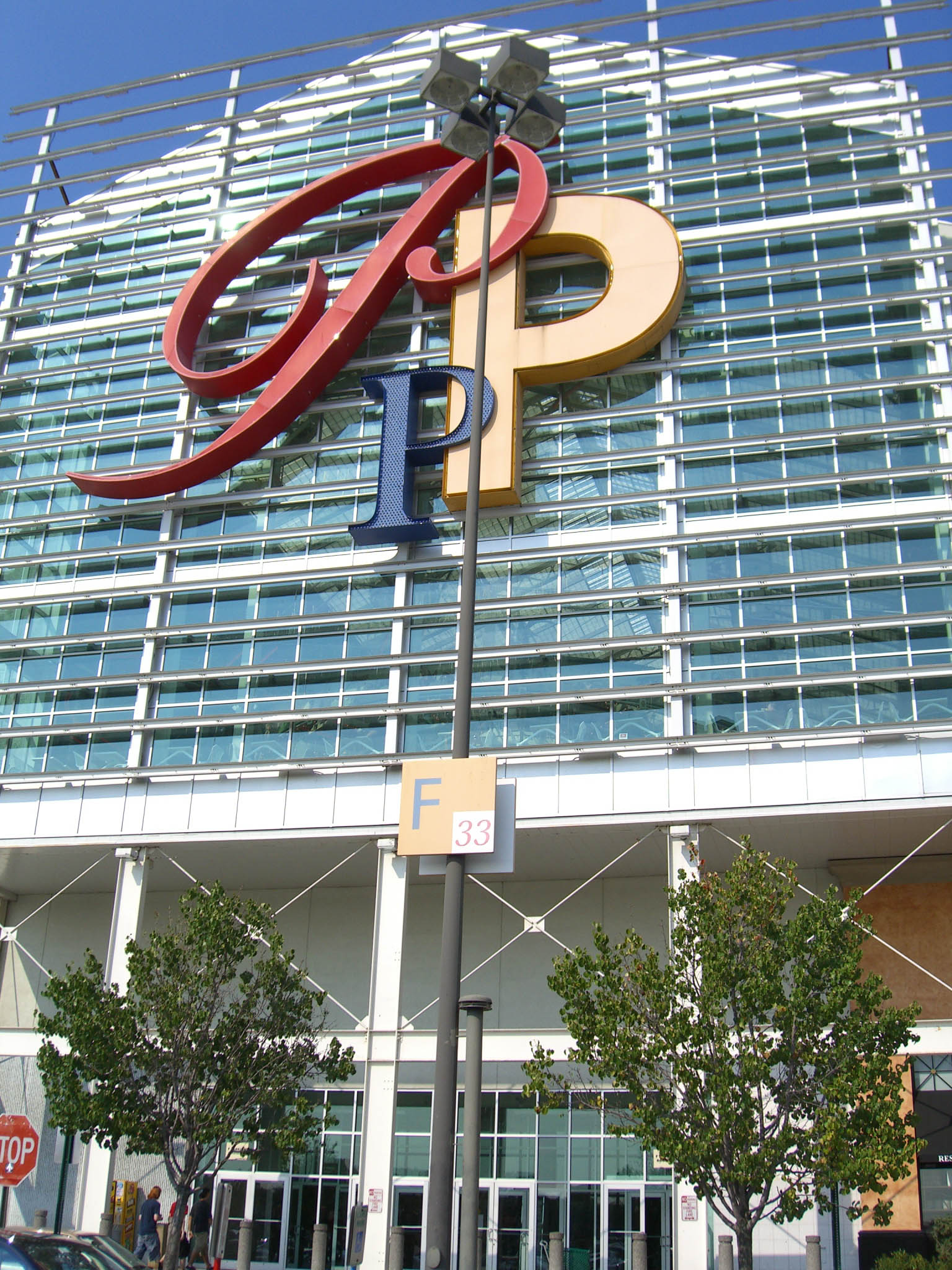
Palisades Center Mall

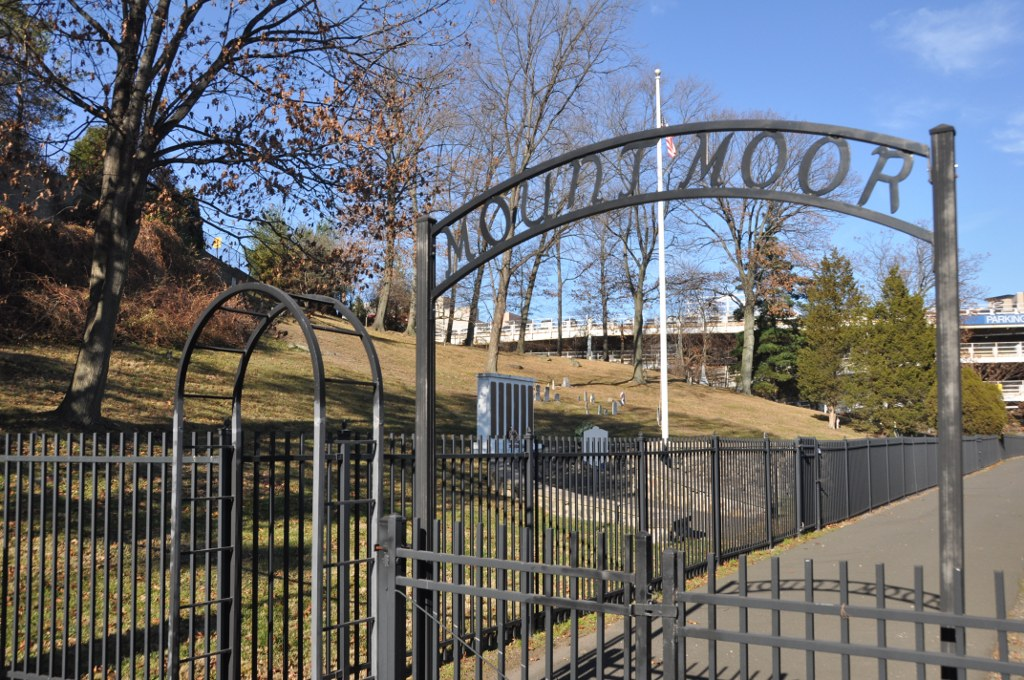
Mount Moor Cemetery

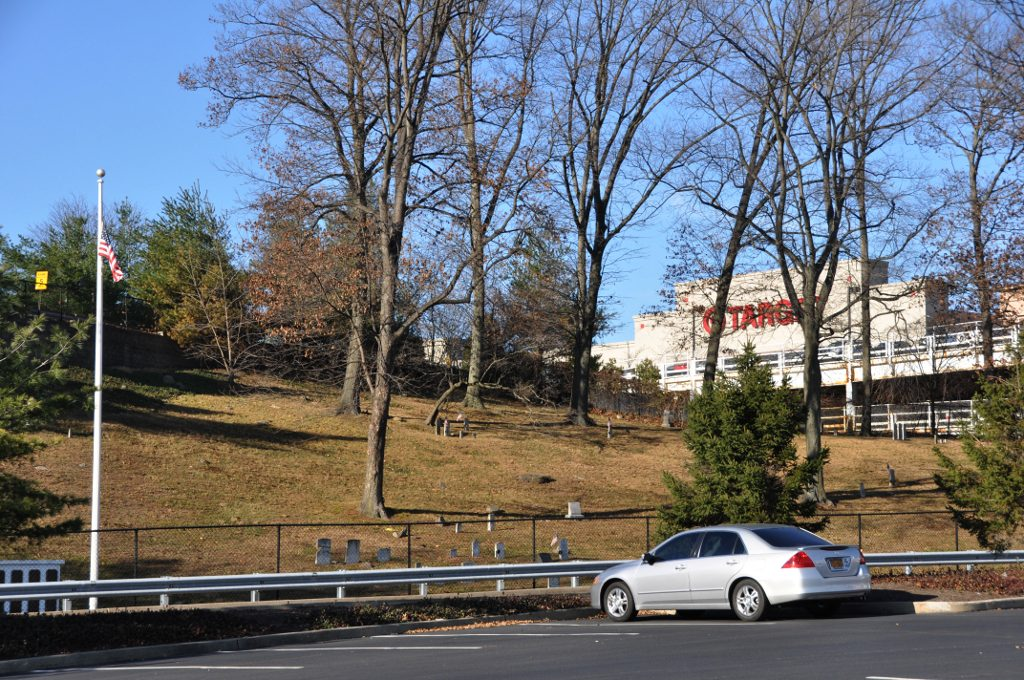
Mount Moor Cemetery

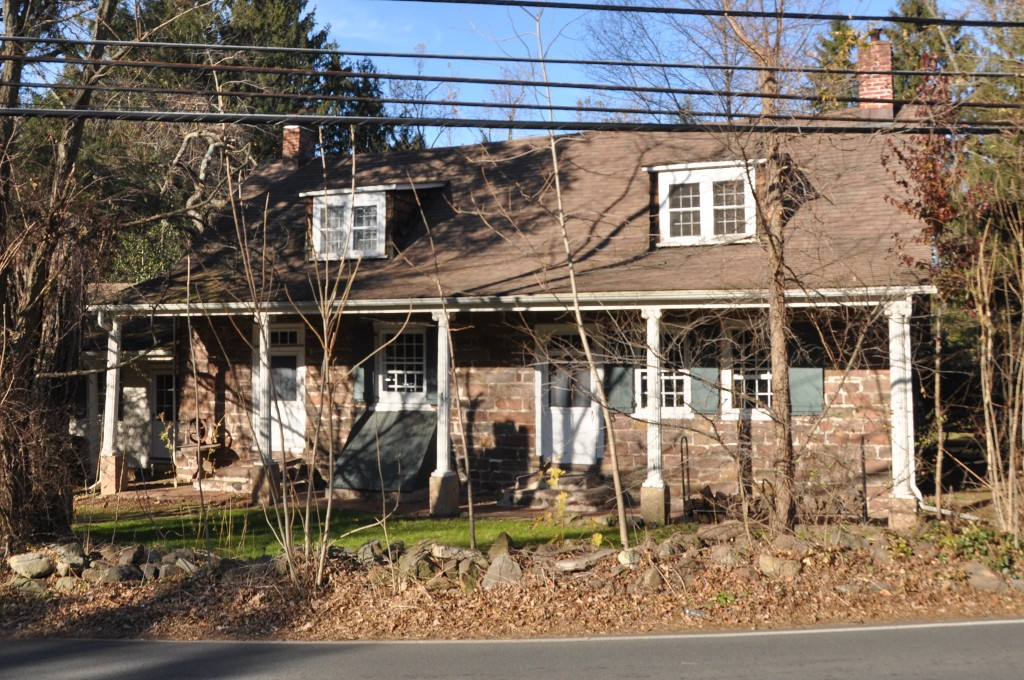
Terneur Hutton House

- Palisades Center, one of the largest malls in the country, is located along Route 59, Route 303 and the New York State Thruway (I-87 and I-287), exit 12.
- Clarkstown Reformed Church – 107 Strawtown Road – Site of the First Reformed Protestant Dutch Church of New Hempstead (name in reference to many who moved here from Hempstead. L.I.). Built in 1750–51 and replaced in 1871 by present Clarkstown Reformed Church, 107 Strawtown Road. The adjacent Old Clarkstown Reformed Church Cemetery was in use for over two centuries; it contains gravestones inscribed in Dutch, as well as the graves of several veterans of Revolutionary War and the War of 1812. Also buried here are several members of the Hill family, which produced three generations of artists and a renowned scientist.
- DeClark-Polhemus Mill – Remnants still exist on the southwestern corner of Strawtown and Germonds roads, West Nyack. The last witchcraft trial in New York State supposedly took place at this gristmill in 1816. Jane (Naut) Kannif, a widow of a Scottish physician, was knowledgeable about herb medicines and was accused of practicing witchcraft. At the mill, Naut was weighed against a large brass-bound Dutch Bible on the large flour balance. Jane outweighed the Bible, was judged innocent and set free. The mill operated into the 20th century to grind flour. The hub of the water wheel still exists as does the dam and mill pond. Historical Marker on site.
- Mount Moor Cemetery – Mount Moor Cemetery sits in the shadow of the Palisades Center Mall, just north of Route 59. This well-kept cemetery is maintained by the Mount Moor Cemetery Association of 1 Milford Lane, Suffern. Although several stones appear to have been professionally restored, many are too badly worn to read. There are also many field stones often used as burial markers with no inscriptions as well as a plain wooden cross. One of the graves at Mount Moor is that of Lafayette Logan, a Buffalo Soldier who fought in the Civil War with the legendary black 54th Massachusetts Volunteer Infantry, the unit made famous in the motion picture Glory. Approximately six other members of the Buffalo Soldiers are buried here. (NRHP)
- Rockland Center for the Arts – Founded by Maxwell Anderson and others in 1947. Programs include a School for the Arts, exhibitions, a performing arts series and a Summer Arts Day Camp. The Center provides opportunities for artists to exhibit, perform, create and teach.
- Terneur-Hutton House – 160 Sickelton Road, National Register of Historic Places. (NRHP)

=== Historical markers ===
- Clarksville – West Nyack and Sickletown Rds.
- Clarksville Inn – 1 Strawtown Road. The inn was built by Thomas Warner in 1840 as a hotel, and the buildings were restored in 1957. As of 2020, the Inn operated as a restaurant.
- Colonial Clarkstown – 135 Strawtown Road
- Old Clarkstown Reformed Church Cemetery – 254 Germonds Road, where services have been held since 1740 in the adjacent Pye's Corner.
- Site of First Reformed Protestant Dutch Church of New Hempstead – 254 Germonds Road
- Nyack Turnpike – West Nyack Road and West Nyack Way
- The Old Parsonage – 106 Strawtown Road
- Van Houten Fields – In 1937 Ralph Borsodi organized a group for the purchase of a 106-acre Dutch farm divided into leased acreage plots, becoming the largest self-administered, back-to-the-land community in Rockland County.
- Washington's Encampment – 134 Strawtown Road, part of the original DeClark Farm fromo which Clarkstown gets its name
- West Nyack's Last Horse Trough, West Nyack Free Library] – 65 Strawtown Road

=== Solar field ===
Clarkstown built New York's first solar field atop a capped landfill in 2014. It was slated to generate 3 million kilowatt-hours – enough power to supply about 200 homes, one-third of the electric needs of the Town of Clarkstown government and there are ongoing discussions about expanding it.

== Notable people ==
- Adam Chanler-Berat, actor (Peter and the Starcatcher, Next to Normal)
- Jake T. Austin, actor (Wizards of Waverly Place)
- John Flaherty (born 1967), retired Major League Baseball player and current YES Network broadcaster
- John William Hill (1812–1879), British-born American artist. He was the son of John Hill who resided in West Nyack and was known as "Master of the Aquatint".
- George William Hill (1838–1914), mathematician and astronomer, student of lunar motion
- Morris Kantor (1896–1974), Russian-born American painter
- Charles Wright Mills (1916, Waco, Texas – 1962, West Nyack, New York), sociologist
- Michael Park (born 1968), Emmy Award-winning actor
- Arthur S. Tompkins (1865-1938), U.S. Representative from New York and a justice of the New York Supreme Court
- Jason Vosler (born 1993), baseball third baseman
