= Nyack Water Works =

Nyack Water Works, also known as the Nyack Water Works Company, was established on March 28, 1873 by William Voorhis and initially drew water from springs and wells. Population growth led to the use of three reservoirs, the Hackensack River and a steam-powered pump house. The Nyack Water Department was created when the Village of Nyack purchased Nyack Water Works from Voorhis' family via eminent domain for $107,000 in 1896 (equivalent to $4,140,900 in 2025) after other attempts to provide water to the villages.
