= Sigrid de Lima =

American novelist

Sigrid de Lima (4 December 1921 – 19 September 1999) was an American novelist.

== Biography ==
She was born in New York City on 4 December 1921. She was the only child of Agnes de Lima, a writer on education, and Andrew Lang. She grew up in New York City, Mexico, and Palo Alto, California. She received her B.A. from Barnard College in 1942 and her M.S. in journalism from Columbia University in 1944. After college, she worked for the United Press and as a freelance journalist until she began writing fiction full-time in 1948, studying in Hiram Hadyn's writer's workshop at the New School of Social Research.

Her first novel, The Captain's Beach, was published by Charles Scribner's Sons in 1950, and told the story of the residents of a rooming house near New York City's waterfront. Although Nelson Algren called it, "a very real achievement in tenderness, in understanding, and in earnestness," the New Yorker's reviewer considered the writing "painfully studied and even windy." Looking back at the novel nearly 50 years later, in her obituary in the The Independent, Christopher Hawtree described it as "the work of somebody who, simultaneously, can write and yet can't."

Her second novel, The Swift Cloud (Scribners, 1952), was about a man falsely accused of murdering his intellectually disabled son. She was awarded the 1953 Prix de Rome fellowship in literature and studied at the American Academy in Rome, where she met and married Stephen Greene, an American artist. They returned to the U. S. in 1954.

Carnival by the Sea (Scribners, 1954), was described in The New York Times as "the moving story of a lovely lost Eurydice, wandering in the gaudy hell of a modern amusement park." Doris Grumbach, reviewing the book for Commonweal, wrote that it "is strong enough to use what it must and impress the whole with an originality and force of its own."

Praise a Fine Day (Random House, 1959) drew upon the experiences of de Lima and her husband in Rome. Told in the voice of a nameless American artist in his early thirties living in New York City, it recalls how he agreed to an arranged marriage with the stateless and pregnant Polish mistress of a wealthy Egyptian Jew to give American citizenship to their unborn child. Entering into the deception for purely financial reasons, he falls in love with the woman but ultimately finds himself abandoned and wondering whether anything he knew about the situation was true. The book received de Lima's best reviews. Edmund Fuller proclaimed her "one of the most deft, accomplished stylists among our younger writers," and Granville Hicks wrote that she had "a delicate style that matches her insights." In his The Independent obituary, Christopher Hawtree called in a "small masterpiece": "the 150 pages take in all manner of manipulation, evil, passion and illicit congress: it could surely have been the basis for one of the era's great movies...."

Her fifth novel, Oriane (Harcourt, Brace & World, 1968) received few reviews and those were less than enthusiastic. The reception so disappointed de Lima that she gave up writing completely. "It broke her heart," said Greene.

She died of a stroke in Nyack, New York, on 19 September 1999. Her daughter, Alison de Lima Greene, is a curator at the Houston Museum of Fine Arts and has published a number of works on modern art.

== Bibliography ==
Novels:

- The Captain's Beach (1950)
- The Swift Cloud (1952) (published in paperback as A Mask of Guilt)
- Carnival by the Sea (1954)
- Praise a Fine Day (1959)
- Oriane (1968)
