= Joseph Pisani =

American painter

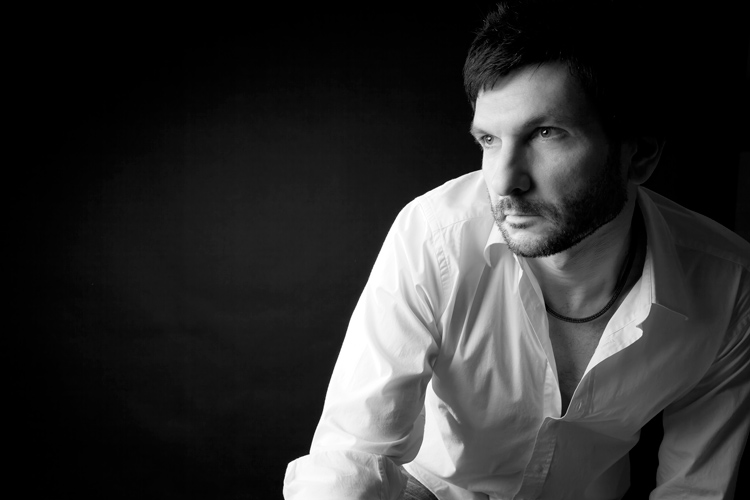
- Artist Joseph Pisani
- Born: November 27, 1971; Bronx, New York, U.S.
- Occupations: Painter, photographer, writer
- Known for: Abstract painting, photography
- Style: Existential Landscapes
- Website: josephpisani.com

Joseph Pisani (born 1971) is an American and Swiss contemporary artist, abstract painter, and photographer, known for large-format abstract paintings that he terms "Existential Landscapes".

== Life ==
Pisani was born and raised in the Bronx, New York, the eldest son of Italian-American parents. His maternal grandmother, born in Italy, taught him to draw and paint beginning at a young age. Around 1975, the family moved to Westchester County, and later to Rockland County, New York when he was in third grade. During his youth he was fascinated by the colors of Van Gogh and the surrealist works of Salvador Dalí. After high school he studied business instead of art at a university in New York at his father's urging, while also founding and fronting the rock band The Acoustic Denial, performing as a singer-songwriter.

He left New York in 1995 and traveled throughout the United States, visiting more than forty states with his guitar, funding his travels by selling self-designed T-shirts during the Grateful Dead tour and at musical festivals, including a jazz and blues festival in New Orleans. Outside Las Vegas, he survived a car crash in the Nevada desert, an incident he has cited as a formative realization of life's fragility. He then set off on a solo backpacking tour of Western Europe, staying in Prague for a time. In 1996 he settled in the Rocky Mountains west of Denver, Colorado, where he began to design and produce furniture and experiment with wood sculpture and mixed media.

In 1998 he traveled to Europe and the Middle East and discovered scuba diving in South Sinai, Egypt, where he worked as a divemaster. It was there that he met his future wife, a Swiss woman. The influence of the colorful underwater life of the Red Sea is apparent in paintings such as The Secrets of the Underwater World, Deep (Approximately 63 Meters Below the Red Sea), and The View from My Bungalow. In a 2006 interview with the Schaffhauser Nachrichten, Pisani also detailed how his travels inspired specific works, including a piece depicting the colored lakes of Flores. A 2013 profile in Vernissage magazine noted that he travels equipped with only a backpack, his guitar, a camera, and a journal, highlighting specific formative journeys that inspired his work, including a bicycle trip from China to Laos and experiences at the Wailing Wall in Jerusalem. Pisani draws thematic inspiration for his work from Friedrich Nietzsche's statement, "One must still have chaos in oneself to give birth to a dancing star," using his extensive travel journals compiled across dozens of countries as source material for his paintings.

In 1999, after leaving Egypt and a six-month period traveling through Southeast Asia, Pisani relocated to Zurich, Switzerland, where he has been based since. He initially worked in commercial design before transitioning to his fine art career full-time. His work was the subject of a solo exhibition at the United Nations Office at Geneva in 2008, and has also been on permanent display at the United States Consulate in Zurich since 2006. Pisani appeared as a guest on the Swiss television talk show Aeschbacher in 2008. On the program he noted that he had kept a promise not to return to the United States for as long as George W. Bush was president due to his opposition to the Iraq War. Pisani continues to travel extensively, having visited seventy-three countries as of 2026.

Beyond his visual art, Pisani has documented his global travels as a writer and photographer. Between 2007 and 2008, he authored a series of travelogues for Inside Switzerland magazine, chronicling spontaneous journeys through Sri Lanka and Eastern Europe, including the unrecognized breakaway state of Trans-Dniester. In these articles, he detailed his methodology of making unplanned travel decisions at bus and train stations, stating: "Spontaneity keeps things fresh, while serendipity guides me through it all. There have been a lot of rough moments along the way, but they often bear the best memories." In March 2011 he delivered a lecture titled "Every Great Journey Begins with a Dream" at the American Resource Center of the National Library of Finland in Helsinki, sponsored by the U.S. Embassy. He has said: "Traveling sets me free and I find myself most alive when the culture shock I feel is strongest... Painting is the way I capture, savor and express these feelings." Pisani is currently writing a memoir, How to Do Everything in Just One Lifetime, documenting more than thirty years of travel and artistic practice.

== Art ==
Pisani's work is influenced by the Abstract Expressionism of the New York School, particularly Mark Rothko and Barnett Newman. Art critics have characterized his abstract paintings as visual travelogues (Reiseerzählung) that capture spontaneous personal encounters and impressions rather than traditional physical landscapes. Art critic Marianne Frey-Hauser similarly described his paintings as 'youthfully unguarded riffs' on Rothko's color-field style, noting recurring geometric motifs that recalled technical drafting plans or aerial views of city blocks. He has described his own method as Existential Landscapes with the poetic titles of his paintings and exhibitions giving clues to the feelings or location or event behind the painting. Unlike Rothko, who avoided giving titles to his work so as not to influence viewers, Pisani deliberately lends clues through poetic titles. Examples of these titles include Tourist Snapshots of Everyday Life, Acquaintances in Foreign Places: The View from Our Window, and Memories of the Warm Indigo Sky. He has said: "My painting is my way of preserving and reflecting on what I've experienced. Unlike Mark Rothko, I want to give the viewer a hint about what the picture represents, hence the titles. Then everyone can form their own thoughts about it."

According to Pisani, the depicted scene in a given work is incidental, serving primarily as a vehicle to explore the experience surrounding its creation: the anticipation, the physical demands of the journey, and the lasting emotional impact. Hanns Bachlechner, a gallerist who represented Pisani at the time, described the works as "independent organisms of lines, surfaces and colors" containing small details, including tally marks, windows, and indecipherable symbols, that serve as keys to understanding. His abstract compositions frequently feature recurring visual elements, such as window shapes representing metaphorical views into the artist's inner thoughts or places visited, as well as etched tally marks that chronologically record personal life events. In the press, Bachlechner also drew subjective comparisons between Pisani's approach and that of Jean-Michel Basquiat, remarking that "Pisani sets in where Basquiat left off." Pisani's paintings are characterized by large formats with fine traces of a self-developed script, which has been compared to musical overtones. Critics have noted his characteristic use of large areas of vibrant, radiant blue, which evokes associations with the sky and the ocean.

He works on canvas, paper, and reclaimed wood, using acrylic, pencil, and oil pastel. He builds up and partially removes layers of paint, etching tally marks and symbols into the surface through scraping, sanding, and reapplication to reveal or obscure details.

Pisani contributed the chapter "Du bois récupéré converti en œuvre d'art" to the 2023 publication De la poule à l'œuf – De la plume aux polymères by Étienne Krähenbühl and Rudy Koopmans, which also features some of his photography. In addition to painting, Pisani is a photographer. His photographic work, which he terms "Field Photography," serves as a parallel visual record to his paintings. Pisani refers to his photography as his "Second Sketchbook," a practice of documenting moments quickly before they pass, rather than composing finished images. He treats the resulting photographs as raw material: a visual record made in the field that he later draws on when developing paintings. Subjects range from momentary tension between people, to incidental contrasts of color he notices in passing, to portraits of individuals he encountered during his travels.

Beyond his field photography, Pisani has worked as a commissioned photographer for gallery exhibitions and editorial features. His portrait and editorial photography of Ellen von Unwerth, a former model turned photographer, was published in Annabelle magazine in conjunction with her 2019 exhibition at Opera Gallery Zurich.

Pisani combined his visual art with a live musical performance at his 2013 exhibition How to Do Everything in Just One Lifetime, where he sang and played guitar to his own original compositions and lyrics, demonstrating that his creativity is not limited to a single medium.

== Philanthropy ==
Pisani's work has been auctioned for charitable causes on multiple occasions. In 2007, two paintings were sold at the Swiss American Golf Championship charity auction to benefit the SOS Children's Village in Rio Hondo, Peru; the event was auctioned by Caroline Lang of Sotheby's Geneva. In 2008, three paintings were sold at the Swiss American Golf Championship charity auction to benefit the SOS Children's Village in Iloilo, Philippines; former Olympic bobsledding gold medalist Hans "Hausi" Leutenegger purchased the work on paper titled When I grow up, I want to be Superman for 2,000 Swiss francs.

In 2009, Pisani created two paintings for the same tournament's auction, with proceeds going to the SOS Children's Village in Itahari, Nepal. In 2017, he created the "art braille kanthari" charity exhibition and auction in association with the kanthari Foundation Switzerland in Zurich. The auction was conducted by Stefan Puttaert, Director of Sotheby's Zurich; the exhibition was based on a three-month documentation trip through Southern India, the 71st country Pisani visited, and included photographs, abstract paintings, video clips, and braille prose documenting seven social projects founded by kanthari alumni. In 2026, he contributed to the "Art for Sight" charity exhibition and auction in Lucerne, organized in association with Rotary Club Zurich Circle International and Rotary Club Kasr El Nile (Cairo).

== Selected Exhibitions ==
(* denotes solo exhibition)

- April 2026, ART1a Gallery, Lucerne, "Art for Sight", charity auction organized by Rotary Club Zurich Circle International in partnership with Rotary Club Kasr El Nile, Cairo, benefiting the "Children's Right to Sight" initiative; Pisani donated the painting Tips & Tricks for Successful Taxi Rides in Cairo.
- 2017 November 7–18, Kulturpark, Zurich, Switzerland, "art braille kanthari", charity auction and exhibition with Stefan Puttaert, Director of Sotheby's Zurich, and Christine Meier.
- 2017 January–18 March, Galerie Le Sud, Zurich, Switzerland, "The Smoke that Thunders", under the patronage of the Permanent Mission of Zambia to the United Nations (UNO), Geneva.*
- 2014 January, Kunstgalerie Bachlechner, Bergdietikon, Switzerland, "How to do Everything in Just One Lifetime", under the patronage of the US Consulate in Zurich*
- 2013 October, Galleria Fogga, Helsinki, Finland, "Oneironauts (Explorers of the Dream World)"*
- 2011, Kunstgalerie Bachlechner, Bergdietikon, Switzerland, "Chaos Within - 40 Years Pisani", under the patronage of the US Consulate in Zurich*
- 2011, Gallery Ferin, Helsinki, Finland, "When The Morning Star Begins to Fade"
- 28 November 2009–16 January 2010, Gallery Eule-Art, Davos, Switzerland, "Fire & Ice"
- 15 April 2009, Artseefeld, Zurich, Switzerland, "AGENT 488"*
- 4 February 2008, United Nations Office, Geneva, "Oh Sweet Serendipity", special showing in association with Sri Lanka's 60th Independence Anniversary*
- 19 January 2008–23 February 2008, Kunstgalerie Bachlechner, Weiningen, Switzerland, "Oh Sweet Serendipity", under the patronage of the Permanent Mission of Sri Lanka to the United Nations Office at Geneva*
- 29 September 2007–23 December 2007, Kunstgalerie Bachlechner, Ost Tirol, Austria, "Kunst Verbindet" — together with work by Le Corbusier, Hans Peter Profunser, Marianne Liegl...
- 27 January 2007–25 February 2007, Kunstgalerie Bachlechner, Weiningen, Switzerland, "Magic Cube" — together with Jan Janczak, Paul Cartier, Paul Racle...
- 26 October 2006–Present (Permanent Exhibit), Consulate of the USA in Zurich, Switzerland, "All the Colors of My Memories from Home"*
- 18 November 2006–23 December 2006, Kunstgalerie Bachlechner, Weiningen, Switzerland, "Train Station" — together with Charles Sambono (Zambia), Gerry Mayer (Austria)
- 2006 September–November, Zurich, Switzerland, "That Lasting Tingle of Déjà Vu", under the patronage of the Consulate of the USA in Zurich*

== See also ==
- Abstract Expressionism
- Contemporary Art
