= Clarkstown High School South =

Public school in New York, United States

Location
- 31 Demarest Mill Road; West Nyack, New York 10994; United States
- 41.103269°N 73.980196°W

Information
- Type: Public
- Motto: Preparing today’s students to conquer tomorrow’s challenges.
- Established: 1971
- School district: Clarkstown Central School District
- Principal: Debbie Tarantino
- Teaching staff: 111.97 (on an FTE basis)
- Grades: 9 to 12
- Enrollment: 1,386 (2023–2024)
- Student to teacher ratio: 12.38
- Colors: Brown and gold
- Athletics conference: Section 1 (NYSPHSAA)
- Mascot: Viking
- Nickname: South
- Team name: Vikings
- Accreditation: Blue Ribbon 2018
- Newspaper: The Viking Voice
- Website: south.ccsd.edu

Clarkstown High School South is a public high school located in West Nyack, New York, United States. It enrolls students in grades 9 through 12, and is one of two high schools in the Clarkstown Central School District (CCSD). It is commonly referred to as "Clarkstown South", or simply "South."

In 2013, Clarkstown South was ranked 565th in Newsweek's list of the 2000 best public high schools in the United States. In 2016, Clarkstown South was ranked 167th in Newsweek's list of the 500 top high schools in the United States.

In 2017, Clarkstown South was one of State Education Commissioner Elia's list of 185 reward schools.

== Facilities ==
Clarkstown South's building consists of a main lobby, large auditorium, gymnasium (including a wrestling room and a fitness center), music wing, planetarium, two lunchrooms, and three floors of classrooms. In the fall of 2005, a planetarium was built in the rear of the building. A greenhouse was also constructed in 2006.

== School groups ==
South offers many music ensembles, including chorus, orchestra, concert band, and marching band.

Clarkstown South takes part in Junior Statesmen of America, FIRST Robotics, DECA, National History Day, United Service Organization/Veterans Affairs Club, Mock Trial Team 2016 Westchester/Rockland County Champions, and Varsity Athletes Against Substance Abuse. The school has a Mu Alpha Theta chapter.

The school hosted the Clarkstown Summer Theatre Festival since its inception in 1973 until its last season in 2010. Subsequently, it hosted the Hudson Valley Teen Summer Theatre program.

== Notable alumni ==
- Corey Baker (born 1989), baseball pitcher
- Tom Basile (born 1975), businessman and politician
- Mat Devine (born 1974), lead singer Of Kill Hannah, actor, author
- Thomas Fitton (Class of 1986), activist, president of Judicial Watch
- Ryan Grant, NFL running back
- Allison Hagendorf (born 1979), television personality, music journalist
- Cindy Jebb (Class of 1978), brigadier general, first female dean of the United States Military Academy at West Point
- Patrick Kivlehan (born 1989), baseball outfielder
- Raffi Krikorian (Class of 1996), CTO of the Emerson Collective, former CTO of the Democratic Party, and former VP of Platform Engineering at Twitter
- Glyph Lefkowitz (Class of 1998), creator of the Twisted framework for the Python programming language
- Jay Leiderman (Class of 1989), criminal defense lawyer, author
- Joseph Pisani (Class of 1989), artist and photographer
- Justin Richardson (Class of 1981), psychiatrist and author
