= 1833 in music =

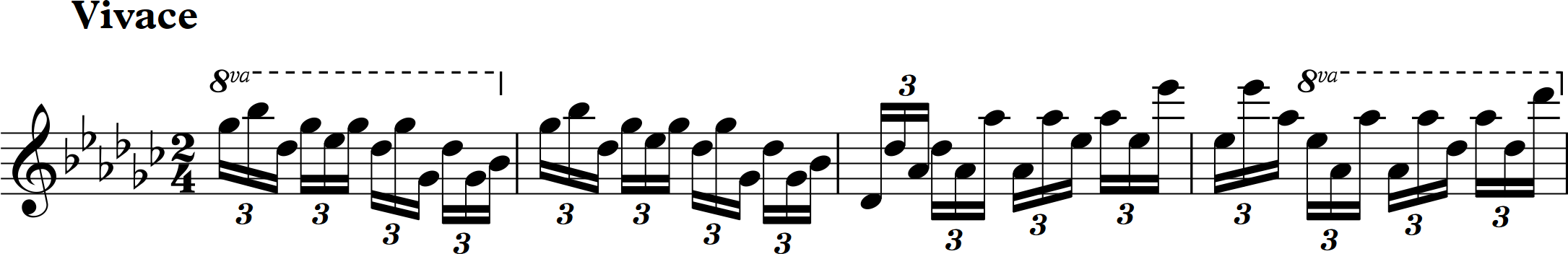
An 8-bar sample of the right hand from Frédéric Chopin's Etude Op. 10, No. 5

This article is about music-related events in 1833.

== Events ==
- February 24 – The Grand Theatre, Warsaw, Poland, is inaugurated with a production of Rossini's The Barber of Seville.
- May 13 – Felix Mendelssohn's Italian Symphony in A major, Op. 90, is premièred under the composer's baton in London; although very successful there he withdraws it for revision.
- July 8 – Lyrics by Francisco Acuña de Figueroa are selected as the National Anthem of Uruguay.
- October 3 – French composer Hector Berlioz marries Anglo-Irish actress Harriet Smithson in a civil ceremony at the British Embassy in Paris with Liszt as one of the witnesses.
- December 1 – Launch of Le Ménestrel, a French weekly music journal; it survives until 1940.
- Late – First publication of the Toccata and Fugue in D minor, BWV 565 for organ attributed to Johann Sebastian Bach as part of a collection of Bach's organ works produced by Breitkopf & Härtel in Leipzig and partly prepared by Mendelssohn.
- Carl Friedrich Rungenhagen, director of the Sing-Akademie zu Berlin, conducts the first performance of Johann Sebastian Bach's St John Passion after the composer's death in 1750.

== Popular music ==
- "God Rest You Merry, Gentlemen"
- "Još Hrvatska ni propala" m. Ferdo Livadić w. Ljudevit Gaj (written in 1832)

== Classical music ==
- Charles Valentin Alkan – Rondo Brilliant for String Quartet
- William Sterndale Bennett – Piano Concerto No. 3 in C minor
- Hector Berlioz – Overture 'King Lear', H 53, premiered December 22 in Paris
- Frédéric Chopin
  - Grande valse brillante in E-flat major, Op. 18
  - Boléro, Op. 19
- Carl Czerny
  - Divertissement de concert, Op.204
  - Introduction, variations et presto finale sur 'Norma', Op.281
  - Piano Trio No.4, Op.289
  - The Art of Preluding, Op.300
- Anton Diabelli – Grande Sonate brillante pour le Pianoforte et Guitare, Op.102
- Fanny Hensel
  - Gegenwart. Allegro Moderato H-U 270
  - In Die Ferne. Allegretto Affettuoso H-U 271
- Ferdinand Hiller – Neuer Frühling, Op.16
- Johann Nepomuk Hummel – Fantasy for piano
- Georg Kopprasch – 60 Etudes for High-Horn, Op.5
- Franz Liszt – Malédiction, S.121
- Joseph Mayseder – String Quintet No. 2 in A minor, Op.51
- Felix Mendelssohn – Symphony No. 4 "Italian"
- Joseph Merk – 20 Exercises for Cello, Op.11
- Sigismond Neukomm – "Fantaisie dramatique on some pages of Milton’s Paradise lost"
- Józef Nowakowski – Piano Quintet, Op. 17
- George Onslow
  - String Quartet No.22, Op.47
  - Symphony No. 3 in F minor
- Carl Gottlieb Reissiger – Piano Trio No.7, Op.85
- Clara Schumann – Romance variée, Op.3
- Robert Schumann – 6 Concert Etudes after Paganini Caprices, Op.10
- Louis Spohr – String Quintet No.4, Op.91
- Johann Strauss Sr
  - Fra Diavolo, Op.41
  - Die vier Temperamente, Op.59
  - Carnevals-Spende, Op.60
  - Tausendsapperment Walzer, Op.61
- Sigismond Thalberg – Fantaisie sur des motifs de l'opéra 'La straniera', Op.9

== Opera ==
- Daniel François Esprit Auber – Gustave III, premiered February 27 in Paris
- Vincenzo Bellini – Beatrice di Tenda, premiered March 16 in Venice
- Hector Berlioz – Les francs-juges, H 23, last revision
- Gaetano Donizetti – Lucrezia Borgia, premiered December 26 in Milan
- Heinrich Marschner – Hans Heiling

== Births ==
- January 17 – Theodor Bradsky, composer (died 1881)
- January 26 – Grenville Dean Wilson, composer (died 1897)
- February 12 – Charles-Wilfrid Bériot, pianist (died 1914)
- February 13 – James William Elliott, nursery rhyme composer (died 1915)
- March 7 – Franz Wohlfahrt, violin teacher and composer (d. 1884)
- March 13 – Nikolay Zverev, pianist (died 1893)
- March 17 – Giuseppe Gariboldi, flautist and composer (d. 1905)
- March 23 – Franz Bendel, pianist (died 1874)
- April 30 – Hortense Schneider, operatic soprano (d. 1920)
- May 1 – Theodor Krause, composer (died 1910)
- May 5 – Jean Becker, violinist (d. 1884)
- May 7 – Johannes Brahms, composer (d. 1897)
- May 9
  - Beniamino Carelli, singing teacher (d. 1921)
  - Bolesław Dembiński, organist and composer (d. 1914)
- May 11 – Jean Becker, violinist (died 1884)
- May 26 – Merian Genast, vocalist (died 1905)
- June 7 – Alexander Ritter, composer and violinist (d. 1896)
- June 8 – Alexander Julius Paul Dorn, composer (died 1901)
- June 20 – Anton Door, pianist (died 1919)
- June 27 – Vladyslav Zaremba, composer and pianist (d. 1902)
- July 26 – Otto Singer, composer (d. 1894)
- September 14 – Francis Edward Bache, organist (died 1858)
- September 19 – Ludwig von Brenner, conductor (died 1902)
- September 26 – Gustav Stolpe, conductor and composer (d. 1902)
- October 14 – William George Cusins, composer (died 1893)
- October 26 – Adelaide Phillips, operatic contralto (d. 1882)
- November 6 – Wilhelm Ganz, composer (died 1914)
- November 12 – Alexander Borodin, composer (d. 1887)
- date unknown
  - Luigi Bassi, clarinet player and composer (d. 1871)
  - Mathilda Enequist, opera singer (d. 1898)

== Deaths ==
- January 16 - Nannette Streicher, German piano maker, composer, music educator and writer (b 1769)
- January 19 – Ferdinand Hérold, composer (b. 1791)
- January 20 – Gertrud Elisabeth Mara, operatic soprano (b. 1749)
- March 3 – Heinrich Werner, composer (b. 1800)
- April 7 – Antoni Radziwiłł, Polish aristocrat and musician (b. 1775)
- April 13 – Elisa von der Recke, lyricist (born 1754)
- May 25 – Johann Andreas Streicher, pianist, composer and piano maker (b. 1761)
- May 28 – Johann Christian Friedrich Hæffner, composer (b. 1759)
- May 29 – William Marshall, fiddler and composer (b. 1748)
- July 24 – Hedda Wrangel, Swedish aristocrat and musician (b. 1792)
- September 14 – John Andrew Stevenson, composer (b. c.1761)
- October 1 – Luísa Todi, operatic soprano (b. 1753)
- October 15 – Michał Kleofas Ogiński, composer and Polish diplomat (born 1765)
- November 8 – Maximilian Stadler, pianist and composer (b. 1748)
