= Grenville Dean Wilson =

American classical composer (1833–1897)

Grenville Dean Wilson (January 26, 1833 - September 20, 1897), was an American pianist and composer, who composed over 150 pieces, mostly for piano solo.

== Early life ==
Grenville D. Wilson was born on January 26, 1833, in Plymouth, Connecticut, to Major S. Wilson. His father was a member of the Massachusetts legislature. His mother taught him music. He spent his early life in Lenox, Massachusetts.

== Career ==
Wilson taught music in Cornwall, Connecticut, and in Boston for some time. He then taught music at Temple Grove Seminary in Saratoga Springs, New York. He taught Emma Albani in Saratoga and performed with Louis Moreau Gottschalk. According to his obituary, he composed around 300 pieces of music. "The Shepherd Boy" was his best known piece. He was a member of the New York State Music Teachers' Association.

Wilson worked in Nyack, New York, as a piano teacher from about 1870 until his death. He organized the Nyack Choral Society around 1879. He remained its conductor up until his death. He was the founder and composer of the Nyack Philharmonic Orchestra. He also founded the Nyack Library. He was president of the Agassiz Association of Nyack.

== Personal life ==
Wilson married Josephine McEmery of Albany on August 18, 1869. He was friends with Leopold Damrosch.

Following heart trouble, Wilson died on September 20, 1897, at his home in Nyack.

== Compositions ==
- Opus 1 - Gai Printemps, Idylle for Piano
- Opus 4 - Shepherd Boy for Piano (Shattinger; same as Opus 14)
- Opus 5 - Night Breezes, Nocturne for Piano
- Opus 6 - Au Revoir, Caprice for Piano
- Opus 10 - Happy Days, Pensée Fugitive for Piano
- Opus 11 - The Merry Bells, Caprice for Piano
- Opus 12 - La Coquette, Galop for Piano
- Opus 13 - A Night in June, Idylle for Piano
- Opus 14 - The Shepherd Boy, Summer Idyl for Piano (Ditson; same as Opus 4)
- Opus 15 - The Fairest One, Valse for Piano
- Opus 16 - Morning, Rêverie for Piano
- Opus 18 - Two Idylles for Piano
1. Among the Hills
2. Memory
- Opus 22 - Sleep Well!, Nocturne for Piano
- Opus 23 - Dreaming of Home - Transcription sur une Romance de C.R. Howard, for Piano
- Opus 25 - Happy Return, Romance sans Paroles for Piano
- Opus 26 - Trippin' thru' the Meadows, Rondo Polka for Piano
- Opus 32 - Eola, Mazurka for Piano
- Opus 35 - The little Wanderer, Idylle for Piano
- Opus 36 - Laughing Wave, Mazurka Brillante for Piano
- Opus 37 - Dance of the Haymakers, Morceau de Concert for Piano
- Opus 38 - Fairy Bells, Morceau de Salon for Piano
- Opus 39 - Whispering Breezes, Morceau de Salon for Piano
- Opus 40 - Sonatine for Piano
- Opus 42 - The Chapel, Rêverie for Piano (also known as The Wayside Chapel)
- Opus 43 - In Our Boat, Morceau for Piano
- Opus 46 - Christmas Bells, Morceau de Salon for Piano
- Opus 48 - Sounds from the Palisades, for Piano
- Opus 50 - Blushing Roses, for Piano
- Opus 55 - The Stranger's Story, Tone-poem for Piano
- Opus 56 - Westward Ho!, Grande Galop de Concert for Piano
- Opus 60 - Moonlight on the Hudson, Morceau for Piano
- Opus 65 - Au Bord du Lac, Morceau de Genre for Piano
- Opus 72 - The Red Cross, Grande Marche for Piano
- Opus 75 - Pride of our Home, Nocturne for Piano
- Opus 81 - Merry Christmas, Morceau de Salon for Piano
- Opus 84 - Reveries of the Past, Romance sans Paroles for Piano
- Opus 130 - Esmeralda, Scherzo-waltz for Piano
- Opus 144 - Sonatina in G major for Piano
- Opus 162 - Laughing Eyes, for Piano
- Opus 163 - Pleasant Dreams, for Piano
- Opus 164 - The Chapel in the Mountains, Tone Picture for Piano

Without opus number

- A cross Country! - Gallop for Piano
- Evening Reverie for Piano
- The Hesper Polka - for Piano
- Sweet Murmurs - Caprice for Piano
- Material for Early Piano Instruction - Three Books
