= Hugo Becker =

German cellist (1863–1941)

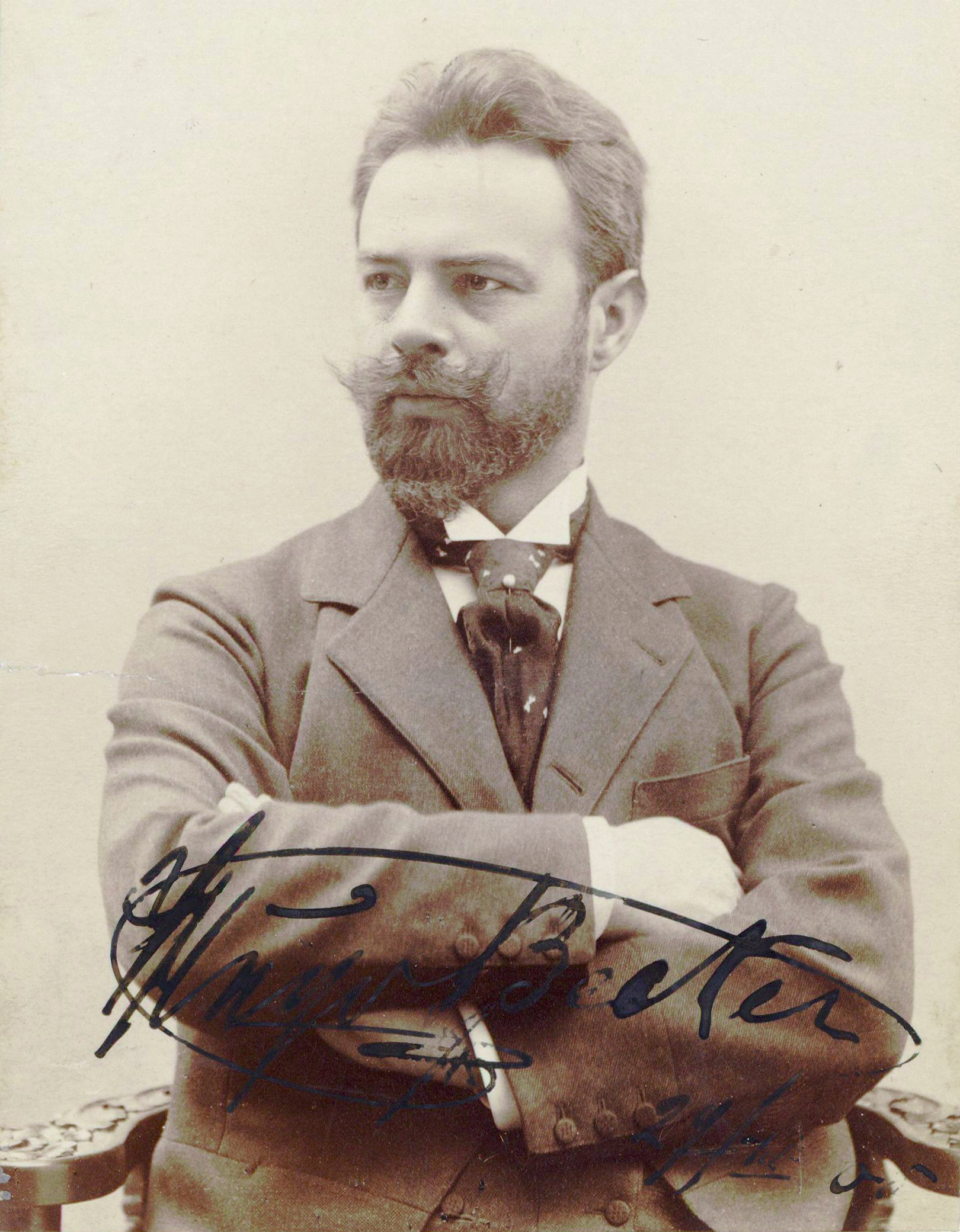

Background information
- Born: Jean Otto Eric Hugo Becker; February 13, 1863; Strasbourg
- Died: July 30, 1941 (aged 78)
- Occupations: Musician; composer; teacher
- Instrument: Cello

Hugo Becker (born Jean Otto Eric Hugo Becker; 13 February 1863 – 30 July 1941) was a German cellist, cello teacher, and composer. He studied at a young age with Alfredo Piatti, and later Friedrich Grützmacher in Dresden.

== Biography ==
He was born in 1863 in Strasbourg (then part of France, but transferred to the German Empire in 1871); his father Jean Becker was a famous violinist. His father tried teaching him violin at the age of six, but the young Becker loved cello, and switched over at the age of nine. By age fifteen he was touring with a string quartet made up of him, his father, sister, and brother. He had also become a leading cellist in the court orchestra in Mannheim.

In 1884, Becker was appointed solo cellist with the Frankfurt Opera Orchestra, and the following year became the leading cello teacher at the Frankfurt Hoch Conservatory. From 1909 to 1929, he was professor of cello at the Hochschule für Musik in Berlin; among his students was George Georgescu, who would replace him as cellist in the Marteau Quartet before forsaking the cello for the conductor's podium on account of a hand injury. Later, Georgescu would remark, "All I know, I learned from Hugo Becker." Becker also gave finishing lessons to Beatrice Harrison.

During this time Becker also toured extensively and played chamber music with Eugène Ysaÿe and Ferruccio Busoni in a piano trio., and later with Artur Schnabel and Carl Flesch as the third Schnabel Trio between 1914 and 1921.

He died on 30 July 1941.

== Legacy ==
He owned two Stradivarius cellos: the 1700 Cristiani and another one built in 1719 now known as the Becker. Two movements from Becker's composition Liebesleben, Op. 7 (1894) for cello and piano have been recorded by Adrian Bradbury and Andrew West.

== Selected works ==
- Andante religioso
- Three Pieces for Cello with Piano Accompaniment
- Scènes d'amour, duo
- Deux Morceaux: Romance, Duo
- Deux Morceaux: Valse gracieuse, Duo
- Cello Concerto, Op.10 in A major (published by Schott in parts in 1902, piano/cello version ca.1896, in score in 1904)
- Aus dem Leben des Waldschrat, suite
- Mechanik und Ästhetik des Violoncellospiels

== Sources ==
- Allmusic
- Sadie, S. (ed.) (1980) The New Grove Dictionary of Music & Musicians, [vol. # 2].
