= Regret the Hour =

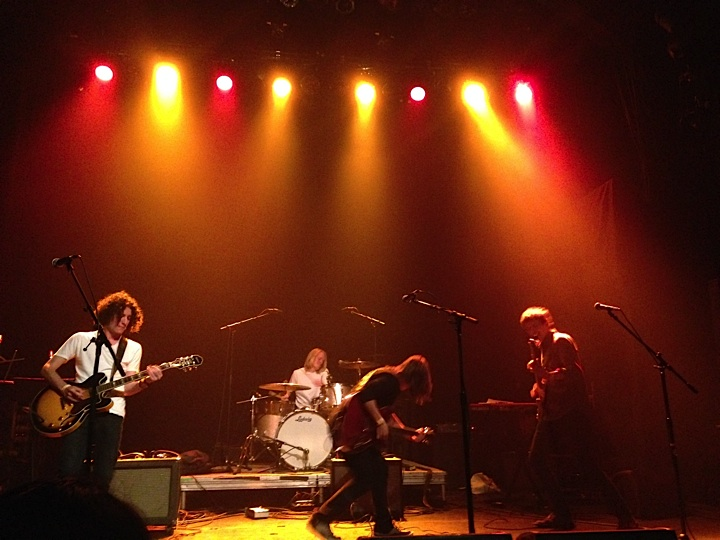
Regret the Hour live at The Gramercy Theatre, 25 September 2013

Regret the Hour was a four-piece American indie rock band from Nyack, New York, formed by brothers Nate and Ben McCarthy, and eventually joined by high school friends Anders Fleming and Jesse Yanko. The band's sound is defined by chiming, churning guitar melodies reminiscent of early U2, a dynamic and versatile rhythm section, and the distinctive, intimate quality of singer Nate McCarthy's voice, which is said to endow the band's music, particularly their live performances, with startling power and sincerity.

Regret the Hour's versatility and energy as a live band have earned them appearances alongside punk legends Misfits, Rock and Roll Hall of Famer Dave Mason, and ambient Indie rockers Hudson Hank, as well as headlining spots at some of New York City's most notable venues: Mercury Lounge, Knitting Factory, Gramercy Theatre, the Studio at Webster Hall and Music Hall of Williamsburg.

== History ==
In November 2012, bass player and founding member Jesse Yanko, 16, died after a battle with stage-four rhabdomyosarcoma. Following Yanko's death, in the Spring of 2013, Regret the Hour released their first full-length record, “Better Days,” a completely-DIY effort that Yanko helped write and record at a now-demolished factory building in Nyack, NY. The album drew acclaim for its standout tracks "Walls" and "The Runaway."

The band worked on an EP with producer/engineer/musician D. James Goodwin (Devo, Norah Jones, the Bravery, Murder by Death) at his Woodstock, NY studio. The band recorded an unreleased, full-length record that was produced and recorded by Aaron Bastinelli in Brooklyn, NY. The band ceased operation in 2018.

== Influences ==
The band has cited a range of major musical influences including Bob Dylan, Neil Young, the Band, and Van Morrison, as well as 80's post-punk and British alternative rock music of the 1990s.

== Members ==
=== Former ===
- Nate McCarthy-Lead vocals, rhythm guitar (2011–2018)
- Ben McCarthy-Lead guitar, vocals (2011–2018)
- Anders Fleming-Drums, vocals (2011–2018)
- Jesse Yanko-Bass, vocals (2011-2012)
- Sam Oatts-Bass, vocals (2013-2014)
- Tim Emmerick-bass, vocals (2014-2018)
