= Ferdo Livadić =

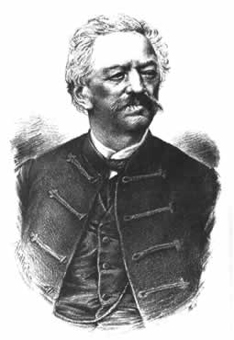
- Born: 30 May 1799; Celje, Duchy of Styria, Habsburg monarchy
- Died: 8 January 1879 (aged 79); Samobor, Kingdom of Croatia-Slavonia, Austria-Hungary
- Occupation: Composer

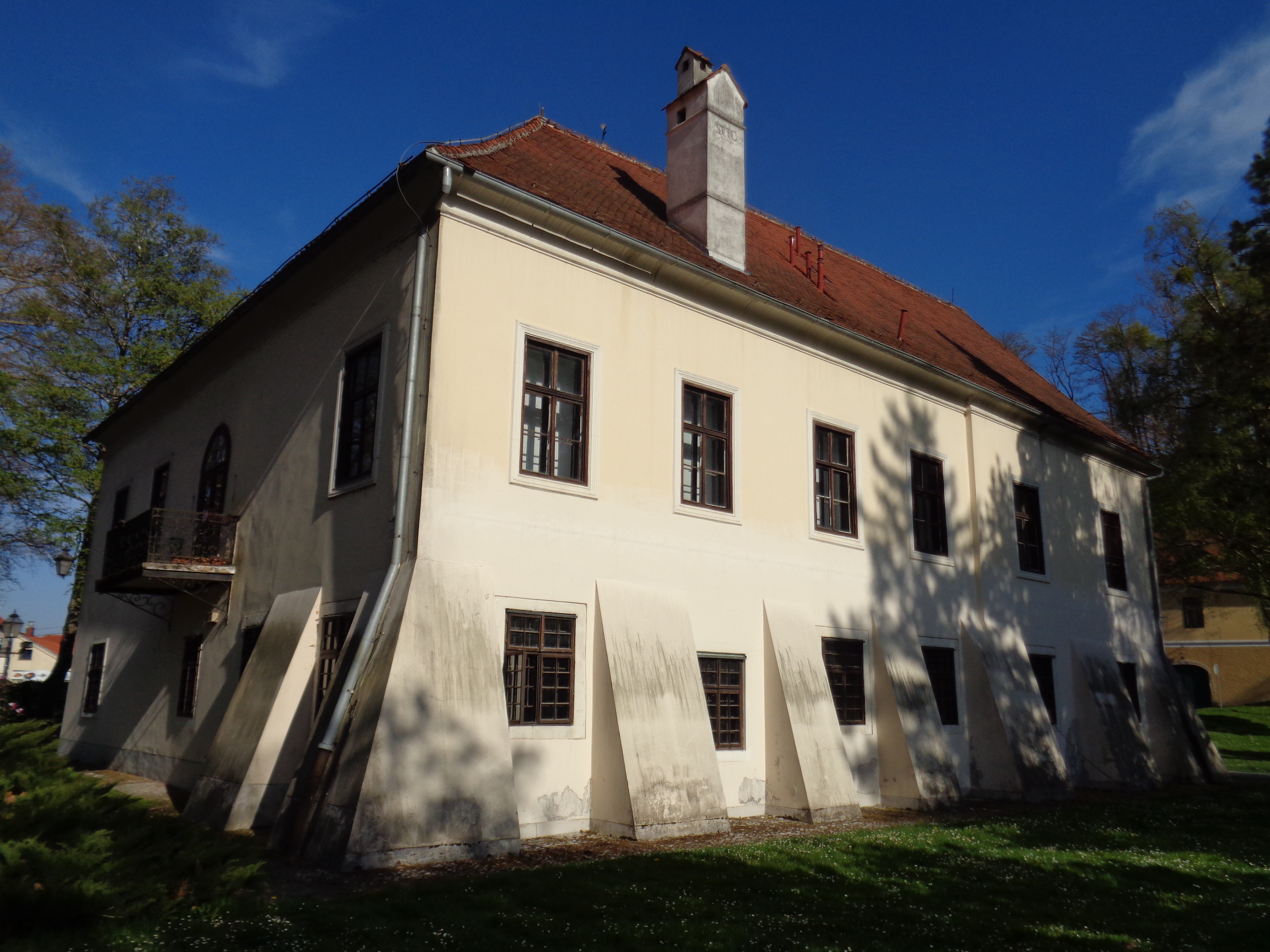
Livadić Manor in Samobor

Ferdo Livadić (Ferdinand Wiesner) (30 May 1799 – 8 January 1879) was a Croatian composer.

Livadić was born in Celje, in present-day Slovenia. A leader of the 19th-century Croatian national revival, he wrote the tune for Još Hrvatska ni propala, the anthem of the Illyrian movement. He frequently invited many of the movement's most important members, together with such celebrities as Franz Liszt, to his property at Samobor. He also composed numerous art songs in Croatian, Slovenian, and German, as well as marches, dances and scherzi for piano. Probably the best of these piano works is a Nocturne in F sharp minor. His work prepared the way for the nationalist Croatian composers Vatroslav Lisinski and Ivan Zajc. He died, aged 79, in Samobor.
