= Luigi Bassi (clarinetist) =

Italian composer and clarinetist

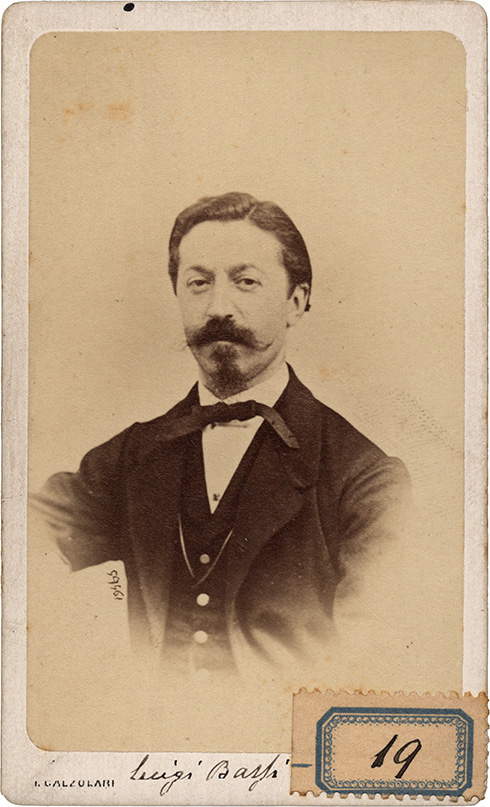

Luigi Bassi (1833–1871) was an Italian composer and clarinetist.

Bassi was born in Cremona and studied at the Milan Conservatory under Benedetto Carulli from 1846 to 1853. He was the principal clarinetist of La Scala in Milan. He composed a total of 27 works for clarinet. He wrote 15 operatic fantasies for clarinet, most notably Fantaisie brillante on Verdi's 'Rigoletto'.
