= Jean Becker (violinist) =

German violinist (1833–1884)

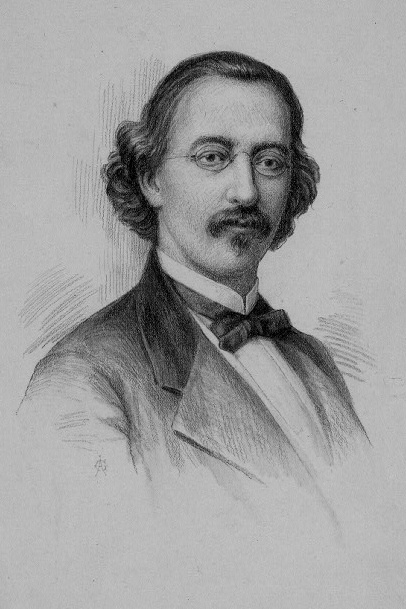

Jean Becker (May 11, 1833 – October 10, 1884) was a German violinist from Mannheim in the Grand Duchy of Baden.

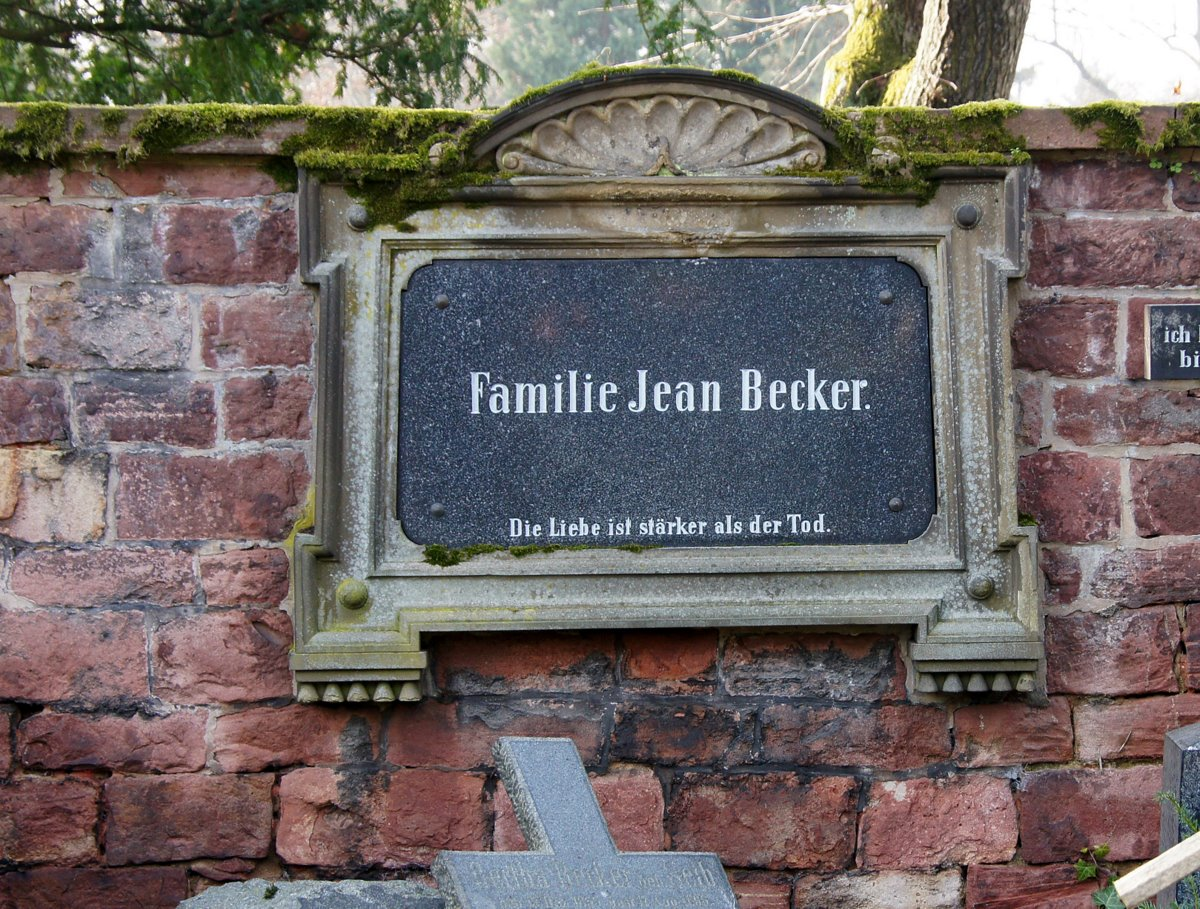
The grave in Mannheim

== Life ==
He studied with Aloys Kettenus and Vincenz Lachner. After a short period as a conductor at Mannheim, he entered upon a series of concert tours (1858). He finally settled in Florence, Italy, where he was the founder and first violinist of the Florentine Quartet which was famous throughout the world at the time.

During his career, Becker toured extensively, both as a solo virtuoso, and later, using a Stradivarius violin (made 1685), as a chamber music performer. He composed some short pieces for the violin, one of which is a Gavotte known to students of the violin today who pursue the Suzuki Method. Antonín Dvořák's "Slavonic" String Quartet No. 10 in E Flat Major Op. 51 (1879) was dedicated to him.

Becker's sons also became known musicians; Hugo Becker became a renowned cellist and Hans Becker a violinist.

== Songs written ==
1. Gavotte
