= Bolesław Dembiński =

Polish composer and organist

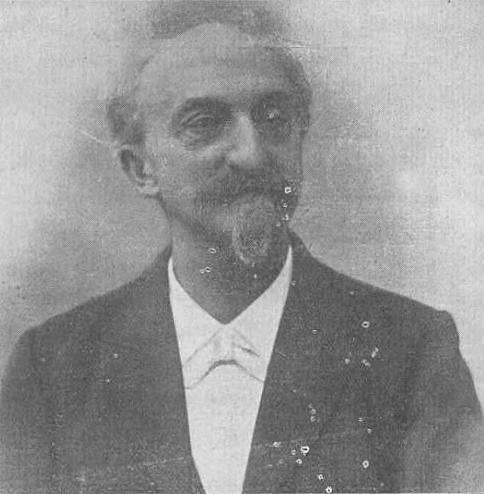
Bolesław Dembiński

Bolesław Dembiński (9 May 1833, Posen (today Poznań) – 7 August 1914) was a Polish composer and organist, and an activist for the singer's societies.
