= Nyack, New York =

- Village
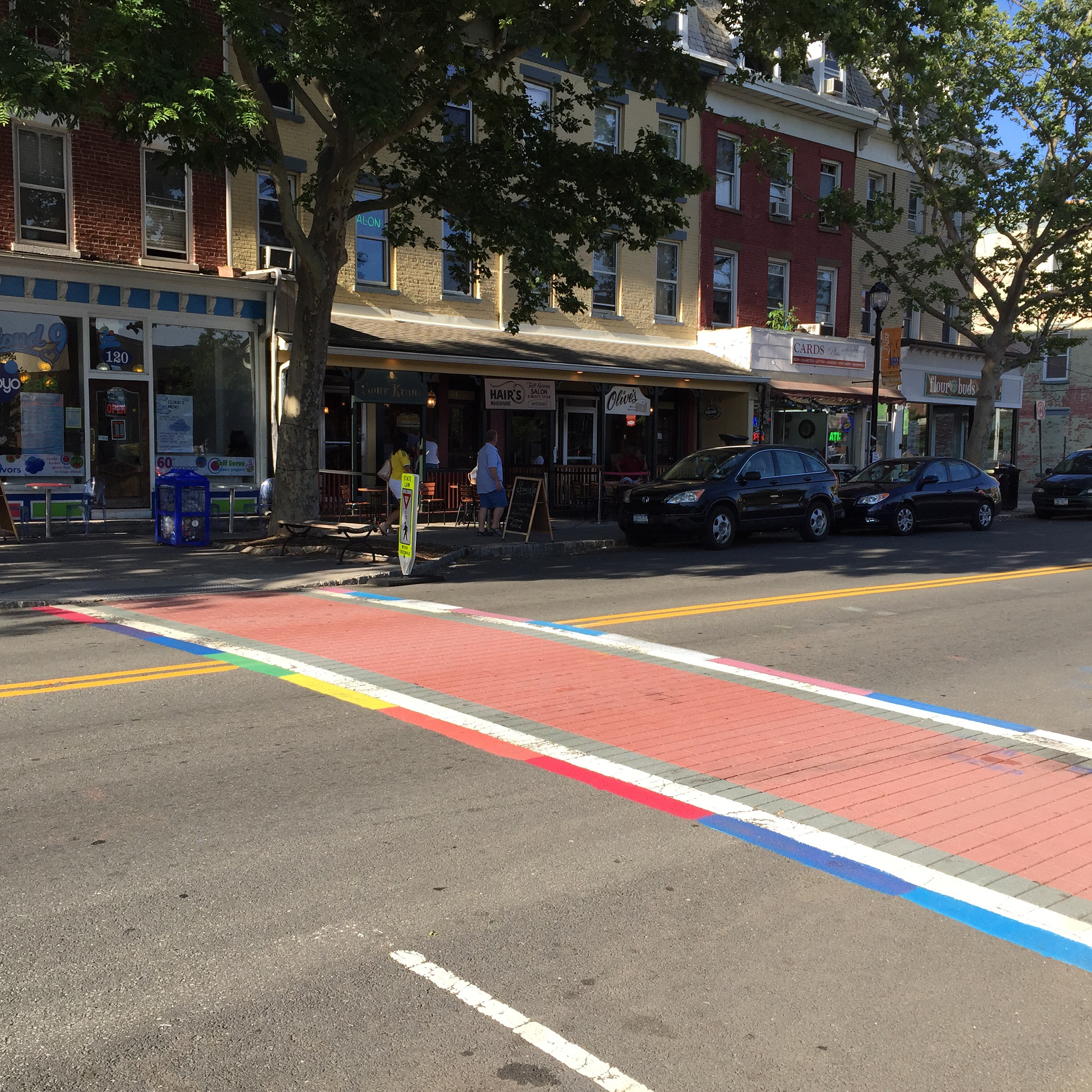
- Main Street in Downtown Nyack

- Seal
- Motto: Art & Soul on the Hudson
- Location in Rockland County and the state of New York

- Location within the state of New York
- Coordinates: 41°5′33″N 73°55′21″W
- Country: United States
- State: New York
- County: Rockland
- Towns: Orangetown and Clarkstown
- Incorporated: February 27, 1883

Government
  - Mayor: Joseph Rand
  - Deputy Mayor: Pascale Jean-Gilles
  - Trustees: Donna Lightfoot-Cooper, Marie T. Lorenzini, and Pascale Jean-Gilles

Area
  - Total: 1.61 sq mi (4.16 km^{2})
  - Land: 0.77 sq mi (1.99 km^{2})
  - Water: 0.83 sq mi (2.16 km^{2})
- Elevation: 72 ft (22 m)

Population (2020)
  - Total: 7,265
  - Density: 9,436.3/sq mi (3,643.36/km^{2})
- Time zone: UTC-5 (Eastern (EST))
  - Summer (DST): UTC-4 (EDT)
- ZIP code: 10960
- Area code: 845
- FIPS code: 36-54100
- GNIS feature ID: 0959074
- Website: www.nyack.gov

Nyack (English pronunciation: /ˈnaɪæk/) is a village primarily located in the town of Orangetown in Rockland County, New York, United States. Incorporated in 1872, a small western section of the village lies in Clarkstown. The population was 7,265 at the time of the 2020 census. It is a suburb of New York City about 15 miles (24 km) north of the Manhattan boundary on the west bank of the Hudson River, north of South Nyack, east of Central Nyack, south of Upper Nyack, and southeast of Valley Cottage. It is one of five villages and hamlets that constitute "The Nyacks", and is named after the Native Americans who lived there before European colonization.

== Setting ==
Nyack is one of five southeastern Rockland County villages and hamlets that constitute "The Nyacks": Nyack, Central Nyack, South Nyack, Upper Nyack and West Nyack. Named after the Native Americans who lived there before European colonization, the village consists mostly of low-rise buildings on hilly terrain along the western shore of the Hudson River. Adjacent South Nyack is the western terminus of the Tappan Zee Bridge, which connects to Tarrytown in Westchester County via U.S. Interstate 87, an important commuter route.

The village encompasses about 1.6 square miles (4.1 km^{2}), over 50% of which is water. It is located in the Nyack Public Schools district.

== History ==
Native American stone relics and oyster middens found along the Hudson River shoreline indicate that present-day Nyack was a popular pre-Colonial fishing location. The first Europeans settled there in 1675, calling the general area "Tappan".

Harman Douwenszen is believed to be the first white settler. He came to America as a toddler and grew up in Bergen, New Jersey, which became New Jersey after the British assumed control and divided New Netherland in 1664. In 1687, Douwenszen asked Governor Dongan for permission to buy a strip of land in the west hills of Tappan (today Nyack), where he had lived for 12 years. His petition was granted, and he bought the land from the Native Americans. He called his farm New Orania (Oranje in Dutch). This section of Nyack became known as Orangetown in 1683. The Tappan Register of 1707 claimed it was pronounced Nay-ack. Nyack became part of Rockland County in 1798. Harman's younger brother Theius changed the family name from Douwse (Frisian for first son) to Talma (Dutch for first son). His children became Talman and eventually Tallmans. The New Orania farm became the Tallman homestead, at the northeast corner of what is now Broadway and Tallman Place. The building was demolished in 1914.

The letter, dated 31 August 1687, is held at the New York State Archives at Albany:

The humble Peticon of Harman Dowse of Tappan Neare Ye River Side, Alias New Orania farm ... your peticonr is a farmer that hath nothing wot comes by his hard labour but by God's Blessing out ye Produce and ye ground, and hath a family to provide for.

A plaque installed in 1938 on the north wall of the Key Bank building at South Broadway and Burd Street in Nyack reads:

The Tappan Indians, from time immemorial, occupied these lands fronting the river shore. Here, in summer they lived upon fish and oysters. In Algonkian dialect spoken by them they called this location NAY-ACK which means the fishing place. The first settlement of white people within the limits of the present Rockland County, New York, took place in 1675 when Harmen Dowesen (Tallman), a young Dutchman of Bergen, New Jersey relocated here.

The Tallmans erected a mill on a stream still known as Mill Brook. Abraham Lydecker purchased land from the Tallmans when there were only seven homes in Nyack in 1813. Nyack became an incorporated village in 1872, according to the same plaque on the Midland Trust Building.

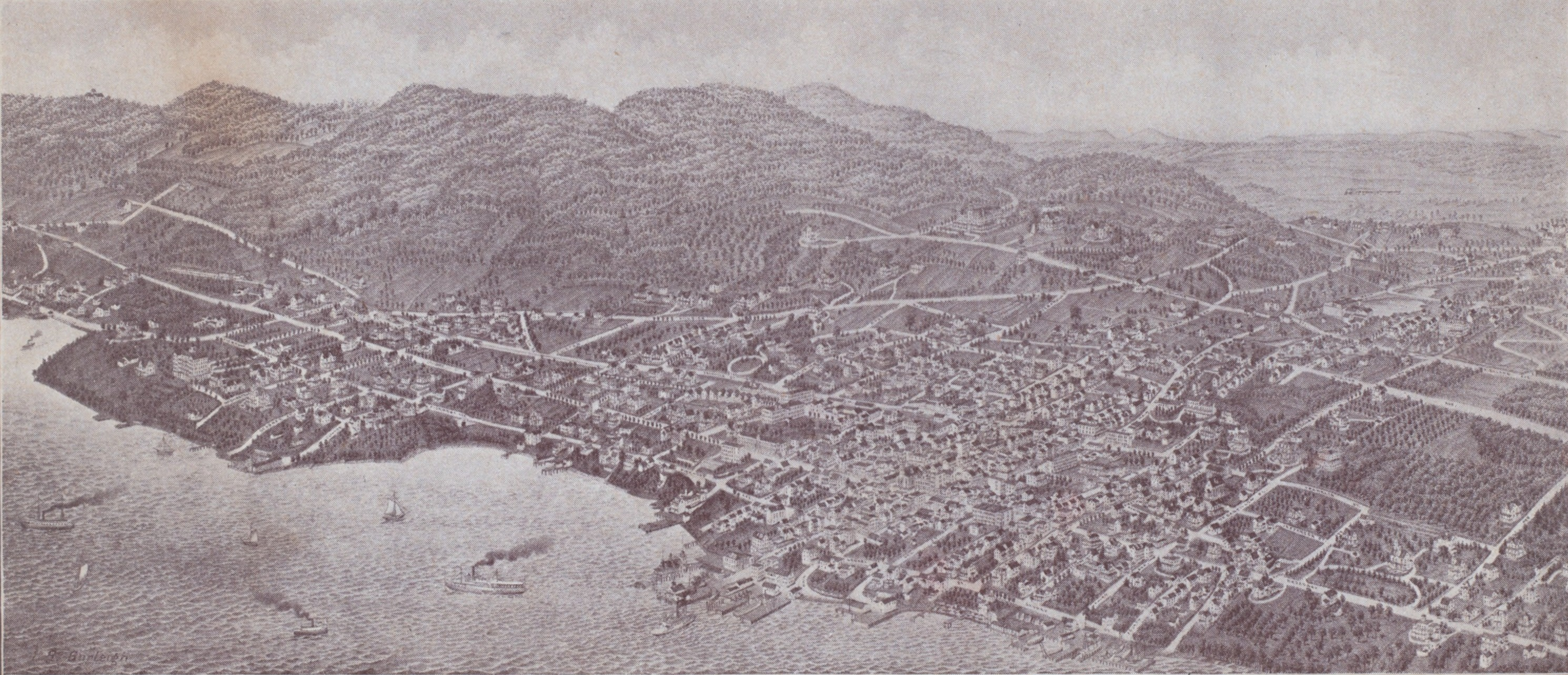
View of Nyack, c. 1898

Three major industries once thrived in Nyack: sandstone quarrying for New York City buildings (c. 1800–1840); boat building—sloops, steamboats, then pleasure craft and World War I and World War II submarine chasers (ca. 1915–1948); and shoe manufacturing (ca. 1828–1900). Following the extension of the Northern Branch into the community in the mid-19th century, rapid growth ensued. As town government was no longer seen as an effective way to deal with the community's needs, village incorporation was discussed. Fearing higher taxes, those in what would have become the northern part of Nyack village formed their own municipal corporation first, named Upper Nyack. Nyack village was incorporated, although without this northern portion. Residents in the southern part of Nyack village, however, soon became dissatisfied with the notion of paying taxes that more heavily benefited the rest of the village. After succeeding in dissolving Nyack's corporation, the southern portion of the former village incorporated as the village of South Nyack. The area between Upper Nyack and South Nyack was reincorporated thereafter, again as Nyack.

The Nyack Rocklands were a minor league baseball team based in Nyack, New York. Unofficially nicknamed the "Rockies", the Rocklands played as members of the Class D level North Atlantic League from 1946 to 1948 and were an affiliate of the Philadelphia Athletics in 1947.

Throughout the 18th and 19th centuries, Nyack was known for its shipbuilding and was the commercial center of Rockland County. In the 19th century, a number of factories manufactured shoes. The Erie Railroad connected with Jersey City, New Jersey, where ferries took passengers to Chambers Street, New York City, until service was discontinued in 1966. With the completion of the Tappan Zee Bridge in December 1955, connecting South Nyack with Tarrytown in Westchester County, the population increased and Nyack's commercial sector expanded.

In the 1980s, the village underwent a major urban revitalization project to commercialize the downtown area and to expand its economy. The Helen Hayes Theatre was built, and the downtown area became home to many new business establishments.

In 1991, the landmark court case Stambovsky v. Ackley ruled that a house at 1 LaVeta Place on the Hudson River was legally haunted and that the owner (but not the real estate agent) was required to disclose that to prospective buyers. The owner, Helen Ackley, had earlier organized haunted house tours and was party to an article about it in Reader's Digest. After Ackley sold the house to another buyer, there were no subsequent reports of hauntings.

On August 10, 2010, Highland Hose Company No. 5, a two-story brick firehouse located at 288 Main Street, celebrated 100 years at the firehouse, which was built in 1910 – fifteen years after Highland Hose was founded. The company's 1949 Ahrens-Fox fire engine was polished to bright, gleaming red and is still in use after more than 50 years.

=== Frederick Douglass at Nyack ===
On August 3, 1865, Frederick Douglass delivered a lecture on Abraham and Emancipation. Douglass advocated for black suffrage and equality, emphasizing the role of slavery in causing the Civil War. Frederick Douglass addressed the people of Nyack on September 23, 1872 at Smithsonian Hall, which opened on April 2, 1872.

== Geography ==
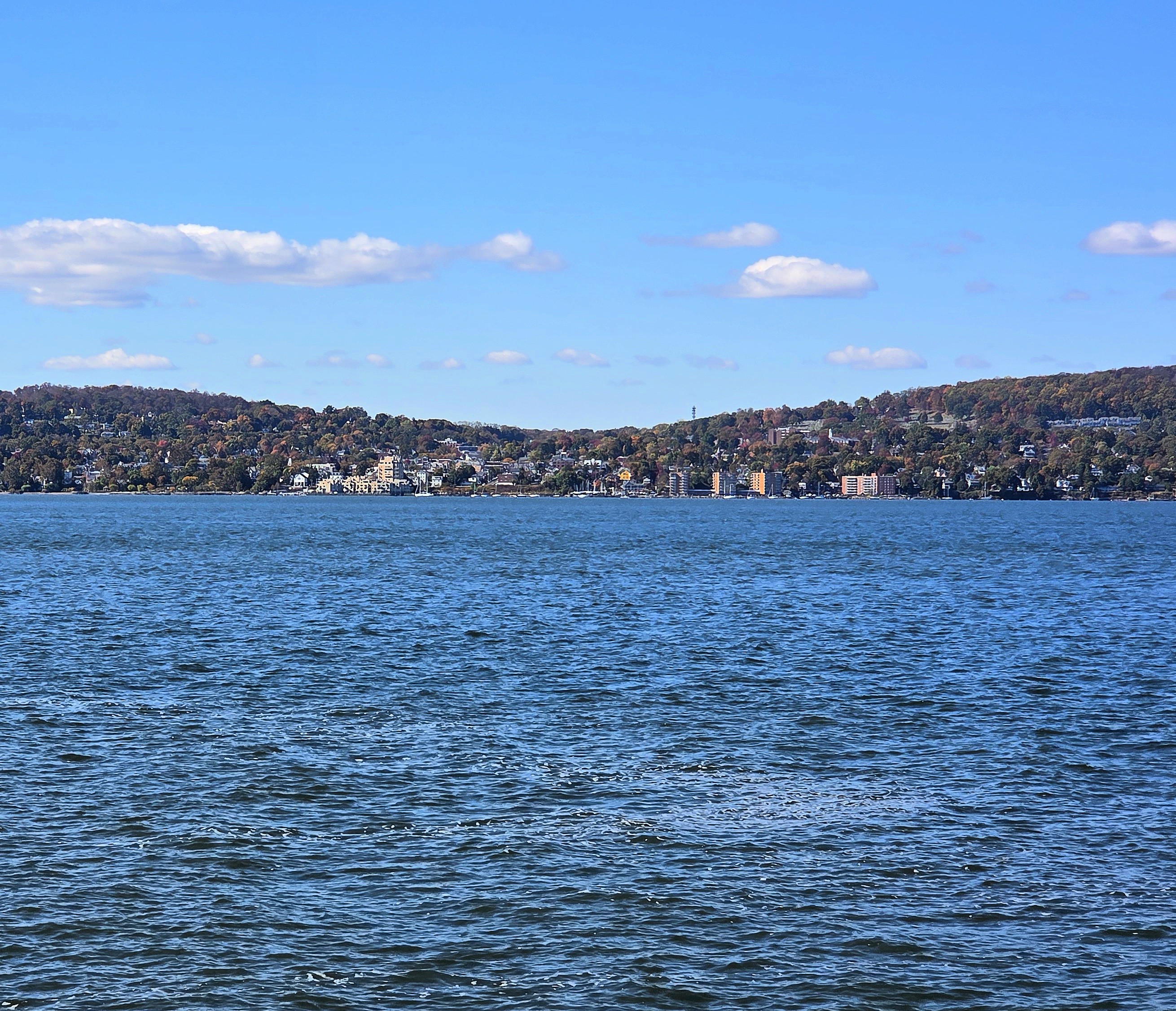
View of Nyack from Sleepy Hollow across the Hudson River

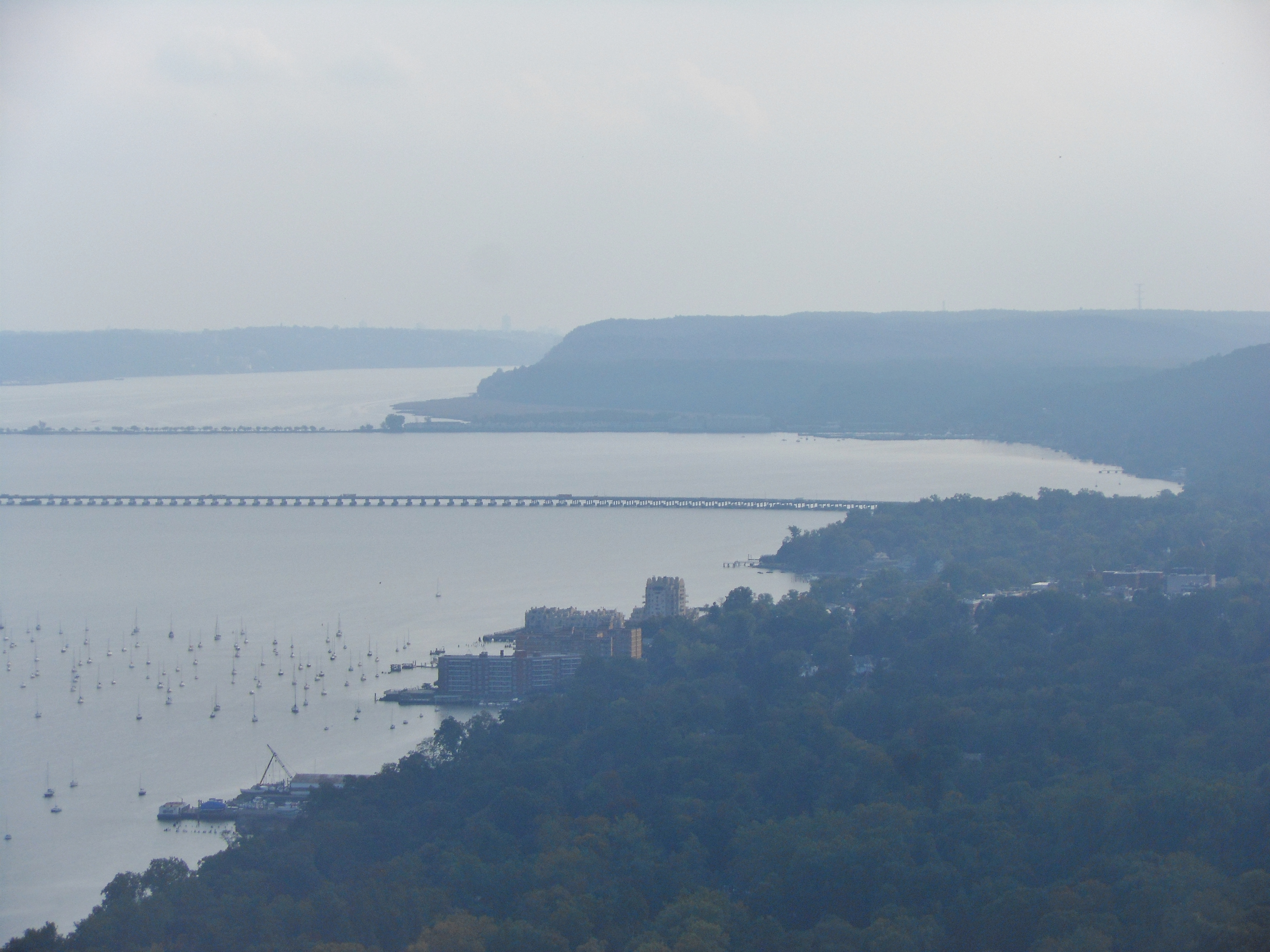
View of Nyack from Hook Mountain

According to the United States Census Bureau, the village has a total area of 1.6 square miles (4.1 km^{2}), of which 0.8 square miles (2.1 km^{2}) is land and 0.8 square miles (2.1 km^{2}) (51.88%) is water.

Nyack is on the west bank of the Hudson River, north of the Tappan Zee Bridge. The village is also home to Hook Mountain and has hilly terrain, especially along the shore of the river. Directly across the river from Nyack is the village of Sleepy Hollow in New York's Westchester County.

== Demographics ==
Historical population
Census	Pop.	Note	%±
1870	3,438		—
1880	3,881		12.9%
1890	4,111		5.9%
1900	4,275		4.0%
1910	4,619		8.0%
1920	4,444		−3.8%
1930	5,392		21.3%
1940	5,206		−3.4%
1950	5,889		13.1%
1960	6,062		2.9%
1970	6,659		9.8%
1980	6,428		−3.5%
1990	6,558		2.0%
2000	6,737		2.7%
2010	6,765		0.4%
2020	7,265		7.4%
U.S. Decennial Census

As of the census of 2000, there were 6,737 people, 3,188 households, and 1,511 families residing in the village. The population density was 8,749.1 inhabitants per square mile (3,378.0/km^{2}). There were 3,288 housing units at an average density of 4,270.0 per square mile (1,648.7/km^{2}). The racial makeup of the village was 63.8% White, 26.3% African American, 0.2% Native American, 2.4% Asian, 2.7% from other races, and 4.6% from two or more races. Hispanic or Latino of any race were 8.6% of the population.

There were 3,188 households, out of which 20.5% had children under the age of 18 living with them, 32.0% were married couples living together, 12.3% had a female householder with no husband present, and 52.6% were non-families. 42.3% of all households were made up of individuals, and 12.3% had someone living alone who was 65 years of age or older. The average household size was 2.10 and the average family size was 2.93.

In the village, the population was spread out, with 19.0% under the age of 18, 6.6% from 18 to 24, 36.2% from 25 to 44, 24.8% from 45 to 64, and 13.5% who were 65 years of age or older. The median age was 38 years. For every 100 females, there were 86.7 males. For every 100 females age 18 and over, there were 84.2 males.

The median income for a household in the village was $54,890, and the median income for a family was $69,146. Men had a median income of $50,043 versus $35,202 for women. The per capita income for the village was $32,699. About 2.2% of families and 6.0% of the population were below the poverty line, including 6.3% of those under age 18 and 8.6% of those age 65 or over.

== Transportation ==
=== Roads ===
Nyack is located along the New York State Thruway, in its concurrent section with Interstate 87 and Interstate 287, just to the north of the Tappan Zee Bridge (officially named the Governor Mario M. Cuomo Bridge). Other important arterial roadways include U.S. Route 9W and New York State Route 59.

=== Rail ===
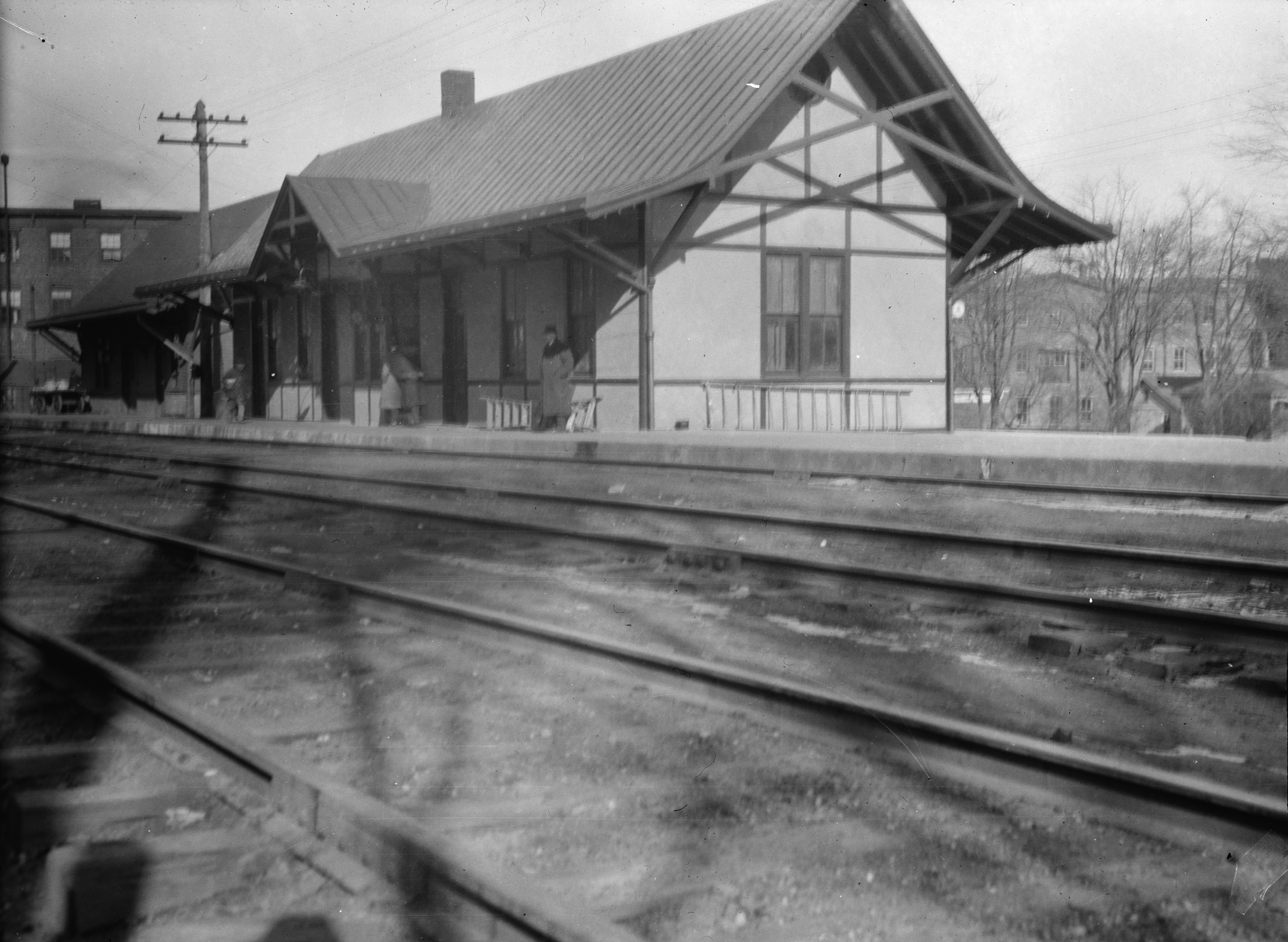
Erie Railway – Nyack Station

Nyack was formerly served by the Northern Branch of the Erie Railroad, with service to Pavonia Terminal in Jersey City. (The southern terminus was shifted to Hoboken in 1958, and the Erie Lackawanna operated the train after 1960.) Passenger service was discontinued in 1966, and the rail line has been converted into a walking path. As a result, Nyack no longer has direct passenger rail service. The nearest railroad stations with current passenger service are Tarrytown 8 miles away and Nanuet 5.8 miles away.

=== Bus ===
Nyack is served by the Lower Hudson Transit Link (known colloquially as Hudson Link), which connects Nyack with rail stations in Tarrytown and White Plains. The bus station is located adjacent to the municipal parking lot on Artopee Way. Nyack is also served by Rockland Coaches 9T buses to the Port Authority Bus Terminal and 9A buses to the George Washington Bridge Bus Terminal in New York City. The Rockland Coaches main bus stop is located at the intersection of South Broadway and Cedar Hill Avenue. A secondary stop is located at the intersection of Midland Avenue and Castle Heights Avenue. Local bus transit is provided by Transport of Rockland.

=== Vessels ===
USS Nyack

== Landmarks and places of interest ==
- Edward Hopper House Art Center – 82 North Broadway – The 1858 home of realist painter Edward Hopper. One room is devoted to materials about Hopper's work and life in Nyack. Three other rooms provide space for monthly exhibits by local artists. The restored garden is the setting for jazz concerts on summer evenings. (NRHP)
- First Methodist Episcopal Church of Nyack 1812–1813 (NRHP)
- John Green House – Main Street – Built in 1817 by John Green of local sandstone (now covered with stucco and painted yellow), it is the oldest house standing in Nyack. Green started the first lumber yard in Nyack and later opened a store. The house is a private residence.
- Memorial Park, a short walk from downtown, has a children's playground, a cement skateboard park, tennis courts, a basketball court and a butterfly garden. Canoes and kayaks can be launched from the shores of the park into the Hudson River. Memorial Park hosts many special events, including weekly music concerts in the summer, numerous festivals, and outdoor movies.
- Nyack Library – 59 South Broadway - the 1903 Carnegie Library building.
- Nyack Post Office – 48 South Broadway - The 1932 building is a rare example of an American post office constructed between the world wars in the Classical Revival architectural style. The post office is located on South Broadway in the center of the village and serves the 10960 ZIP code, which covers South Nyack and Upper Nyack in addition to the village. The building was listed on the National Register of Historic Places in 1988. (NRHP)
- Nyack-Tarrytown Ferry – foot of Main Street – begun 1834 by Isaac S. Blauvelt on a vessel named Donkey, an Anglo corruption of Dutch dank je, or "thank you". The ferry remained in service until the opening of the Tappan Zee Bridge in the 1950s. This spot was also the start of the Nyack Turnpike, the first direct highway across Rockland County.
- Oak Hill Cemetery – 140 N. Highland Avenue (Rte. 9W) – since 1840. Dedicated on June 27, 1848, it reflected a change from small family and religious burial grounds to community cemeteries. Graves include founders of Nyack, novelist Carson McCullers, playwright Charles MacArthur and his wife, actress Helen Hayes, scientist and inventor William Hand, and artist Edward Hopper.
- Pickwick Bookshop - 8 S. Broadway - A local bookstore open in the village since 1945, selling old classics and new bestsellers.
- Red Cross Center – 143 North Broadway - A cross gable Queen Anne building, it was built by Julia and Garret Blauvelt (a physician, surgeon and director of Nyack Hospital) in 1882 and given to the Red Cross in 1915. During World War I, World War II and the Korean War, the center was a hub for food and blood drives, gathering clothes and supplies for shipment overseas. Helen Hayes, who lived nearby, was chairwomen of the war fund drive during World War II. Camp Shanks, one of the military's major wartime staging areas, relied heavily on the Red Cross volunteers and services. Today, the center continues to provide clothing, food and shelter in times of necessity and emergencies, and has also provided certification courses in first aid and lifesaving skills since 9/11.
- River Rowing Association (RRA) – In 1881, Julian O. Davidson, a local artist and marine painter, founded the Nyack Rowing Association (NRA), which was dedicated to the sport of sculling (two-oared rowing). The grand boat house, built in 1882, was designed by William Smith and built in the Stick style architecture found in many river homes in the village.
- Riverspace Arts in Nyack – 119 Main Street - Home of the Rockland Symphony Orchestra
- St. Paul's United Methodist Church – 134 South Broadway, South Nyack - A Romanesque Revival church built in 1894. (NRHP)
- Tappan Zee Playhouse – 20 South Broadway – (NRHP) It was demolished in April 2004.
- Pretty Penny — 235 North Broadway — A Victorian river home that was formerly owned by American actress Helen Hayes and comedian Rosie O'Donnell
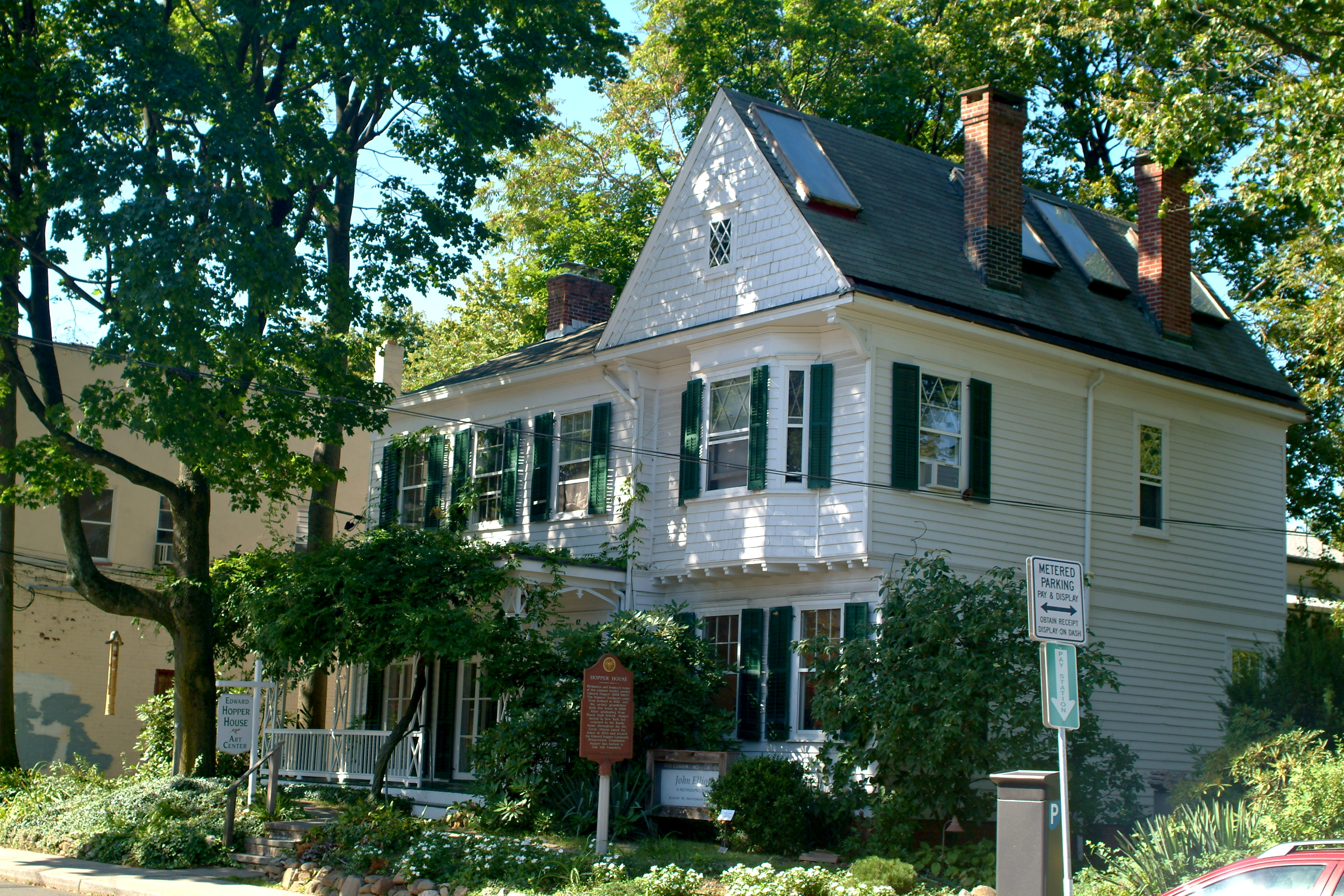
Edward Hopper's birthplace

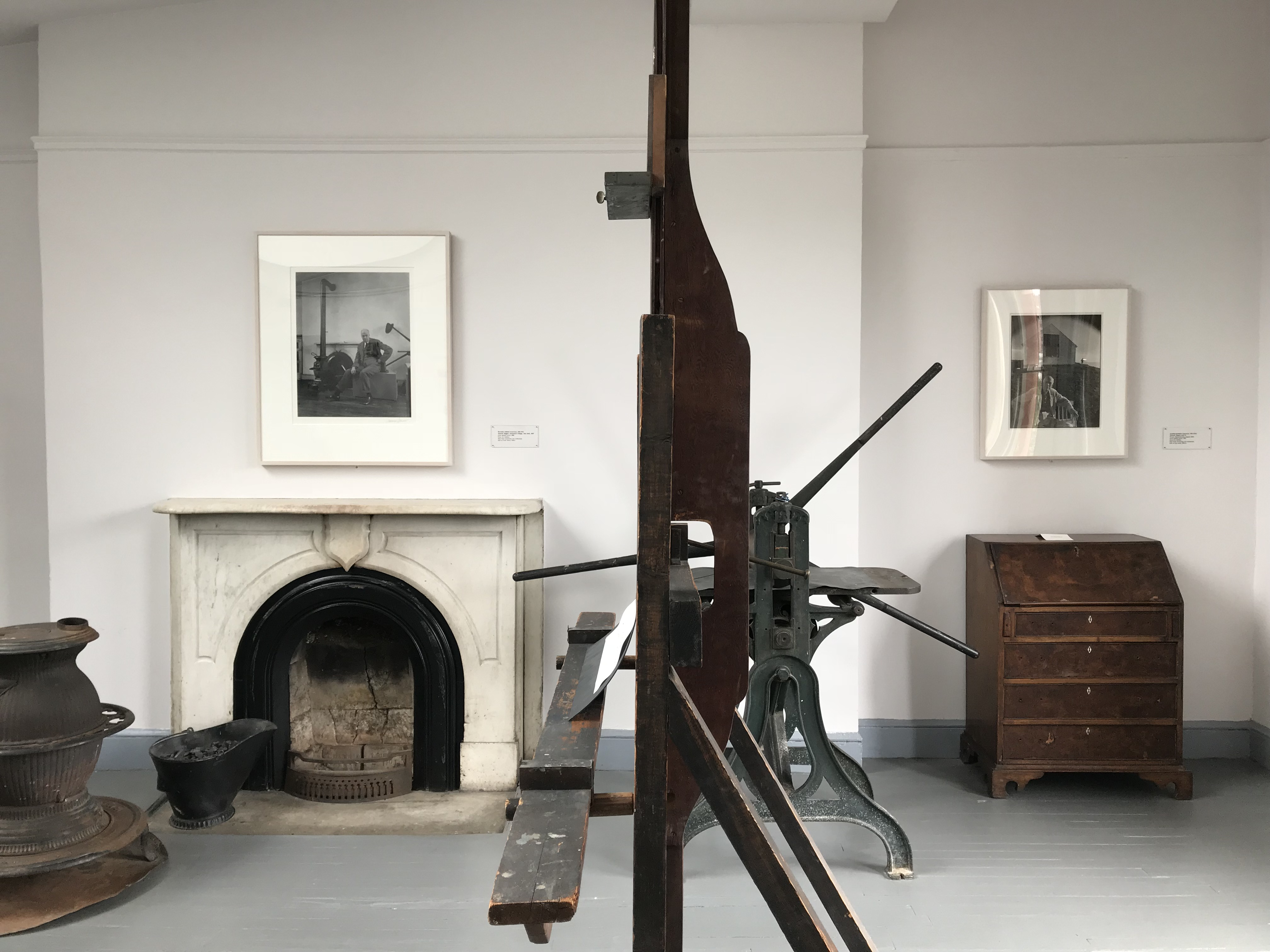
Edward Hopper's studio

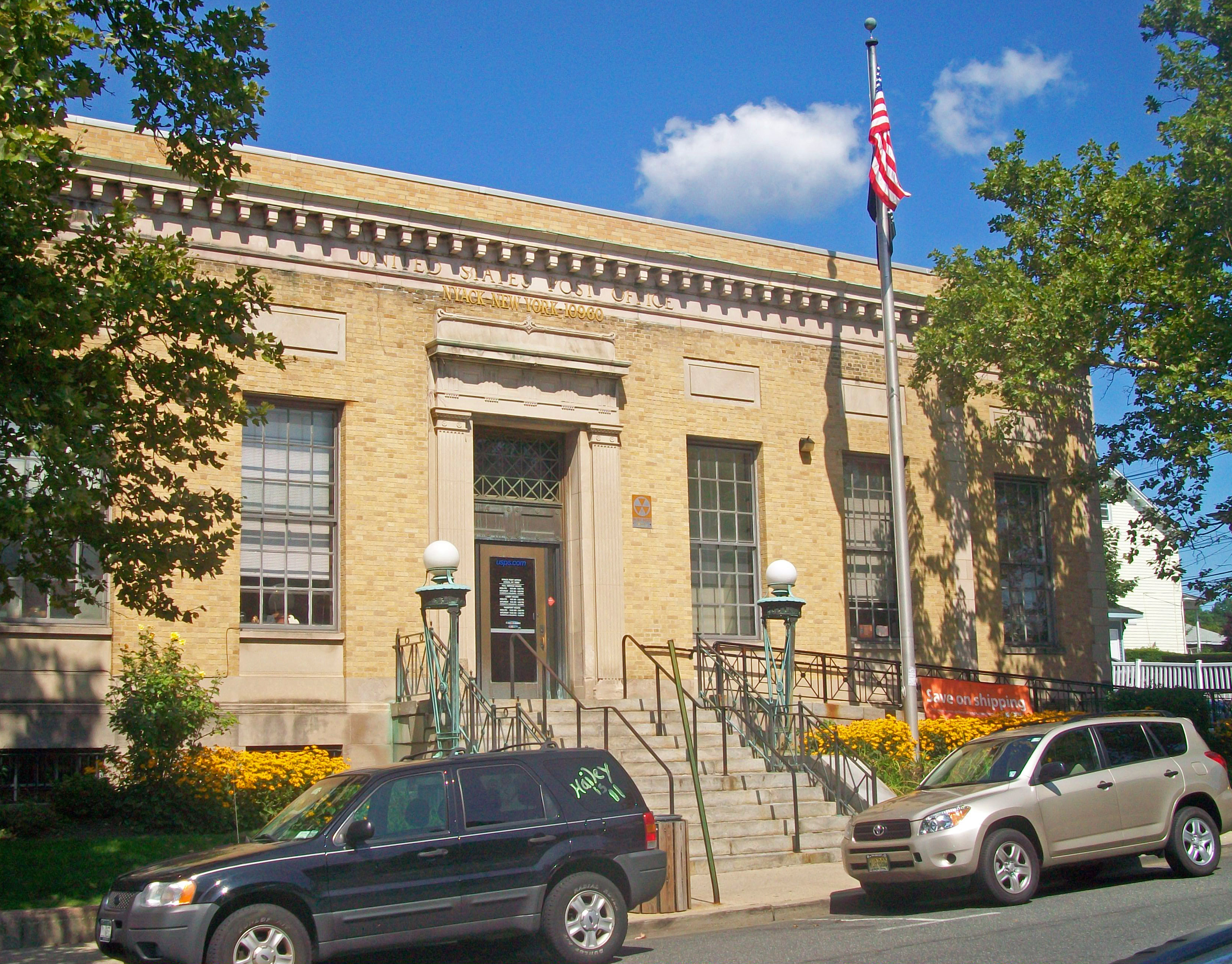
Nyack Post Office

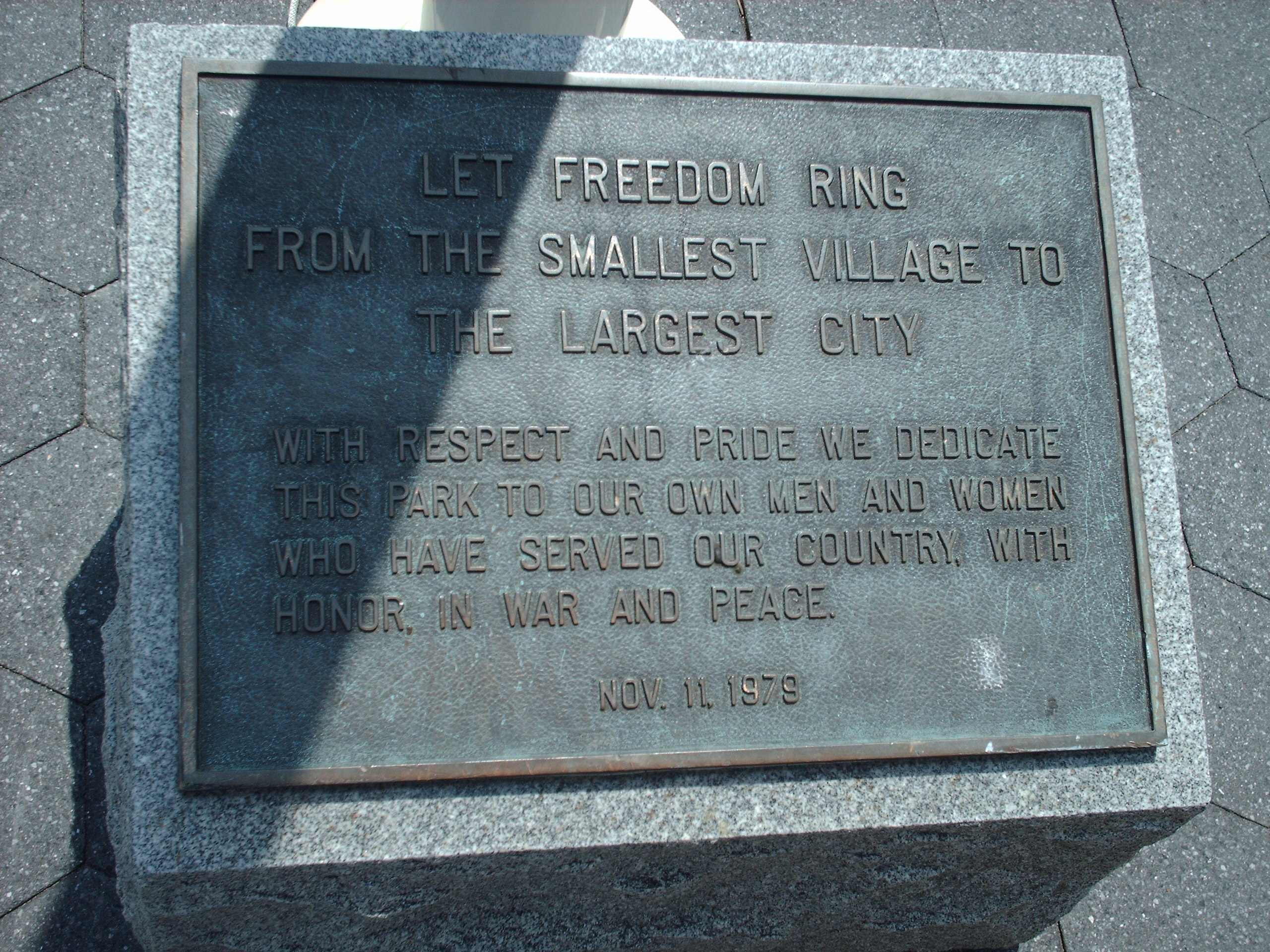
Nyack war memorial

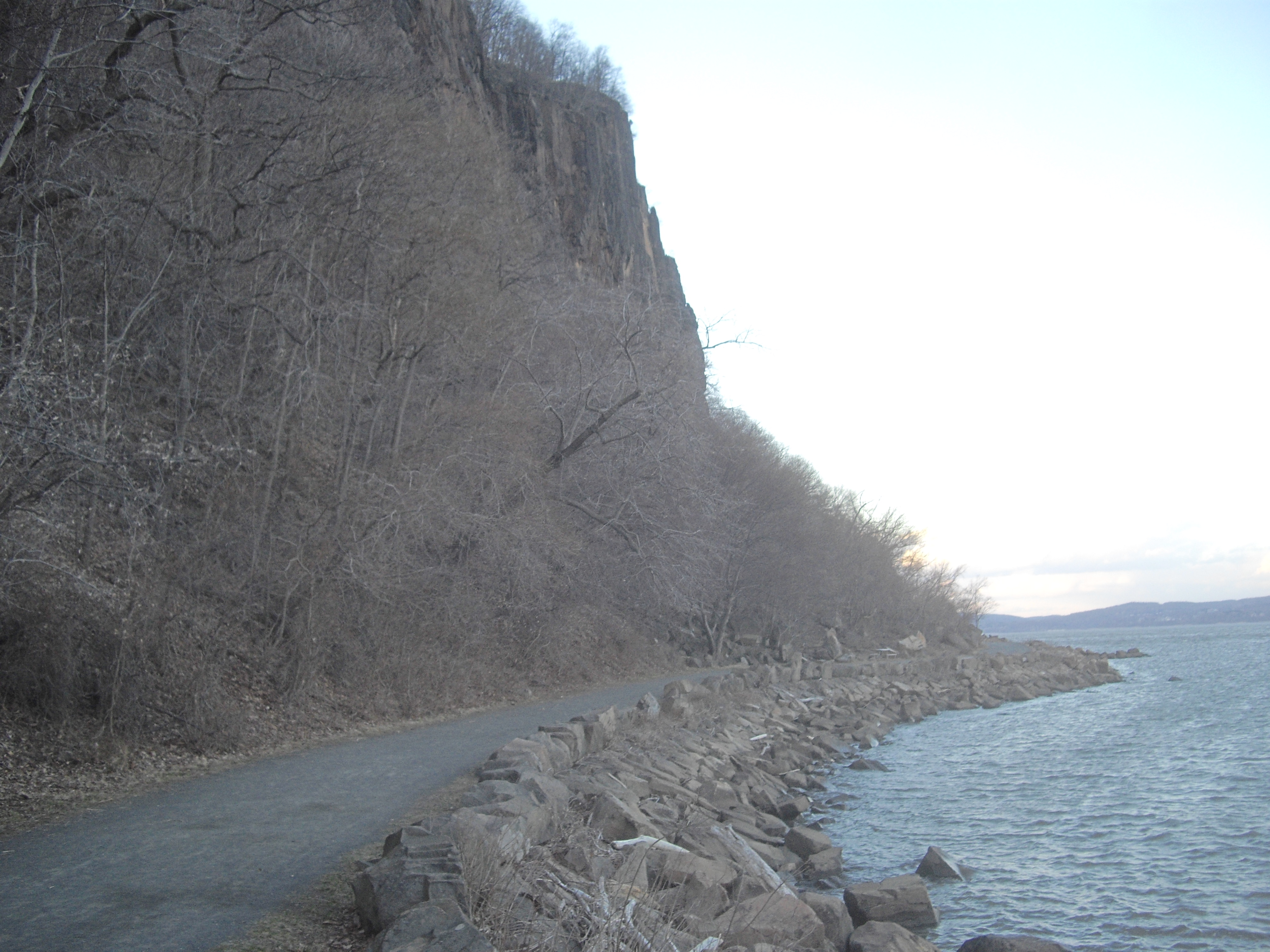
Nyack Beach State Park

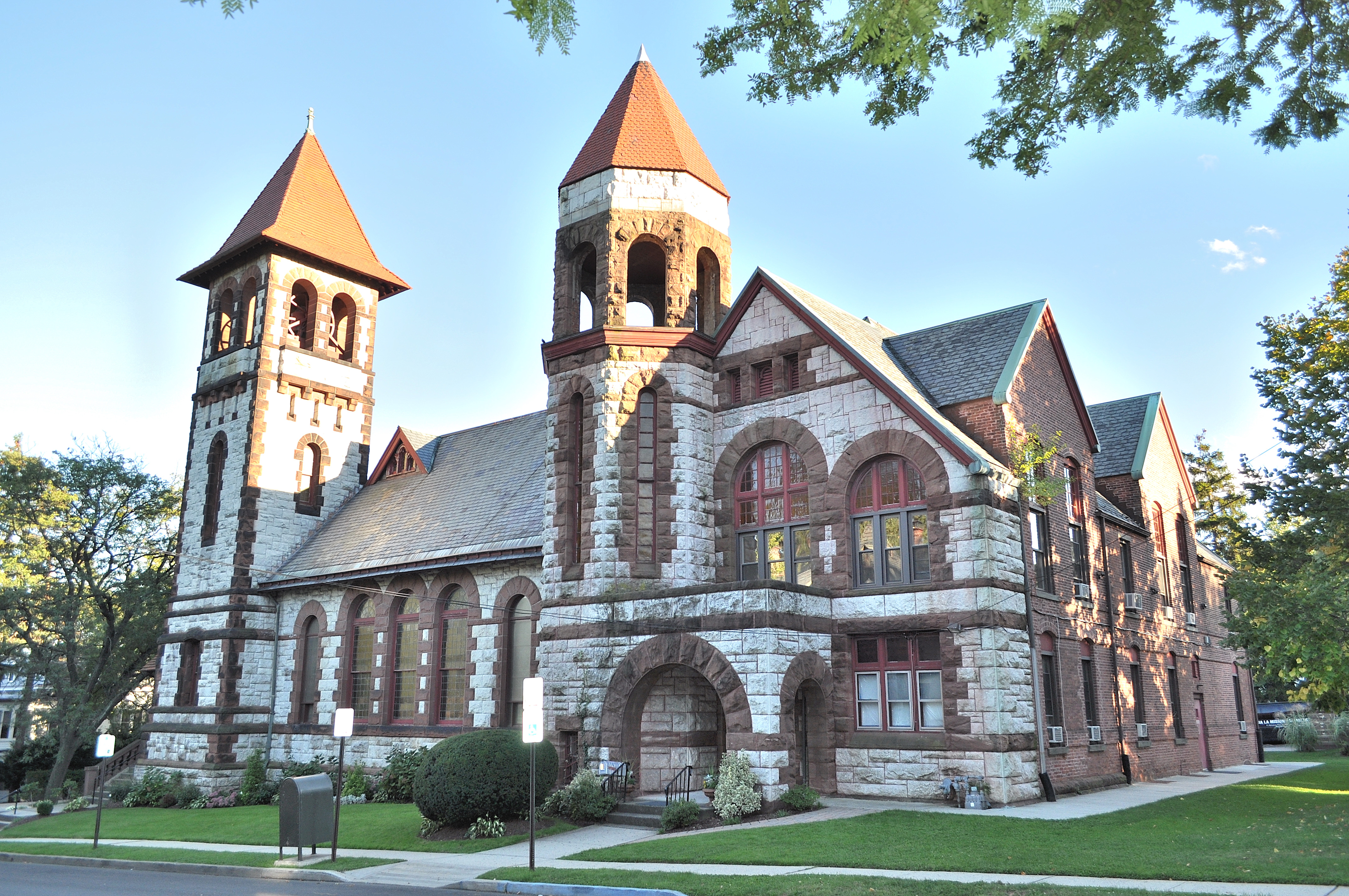
Saint Paul's United Methodist Church

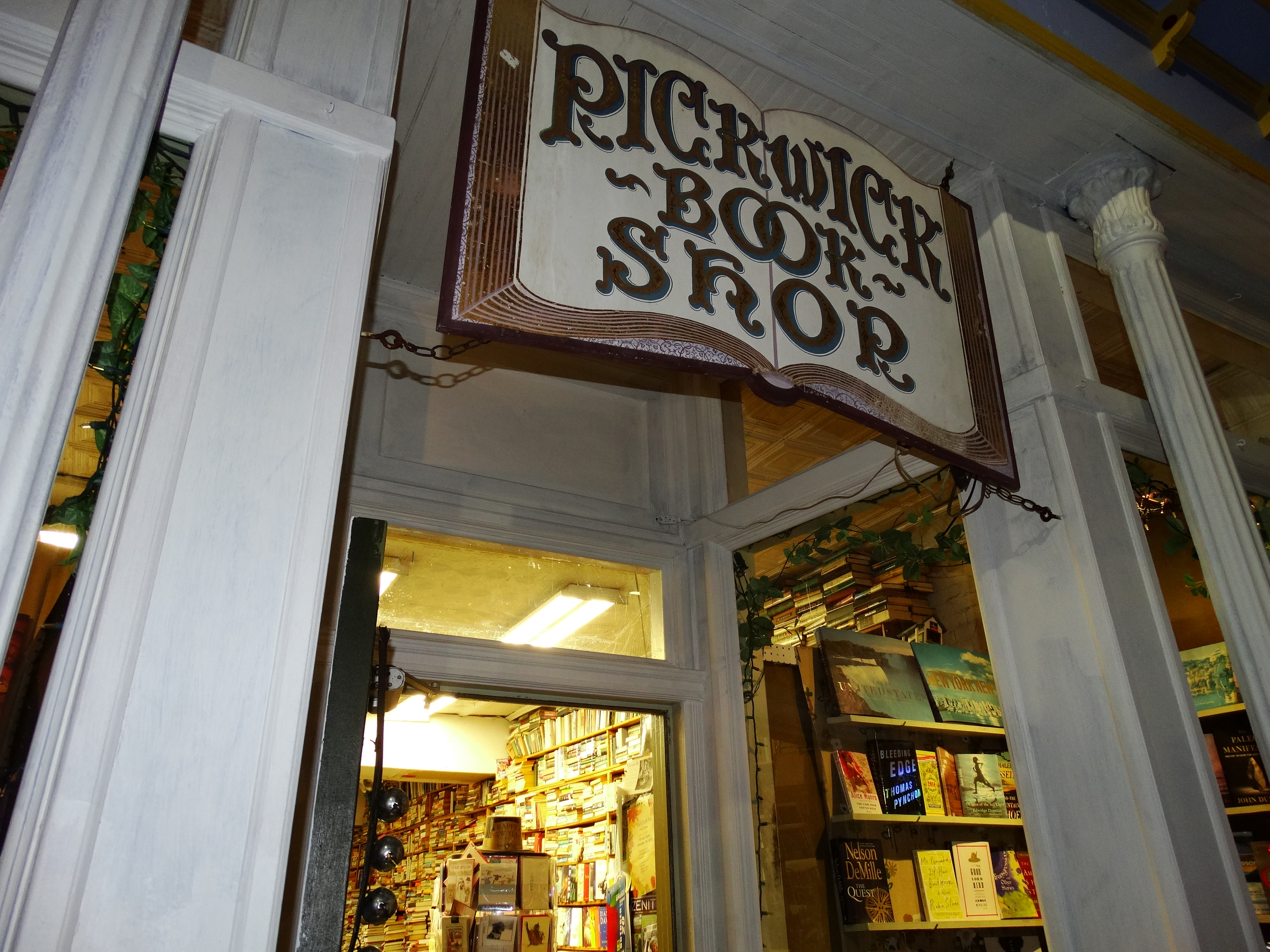
Facade of Pickwick Book Shop

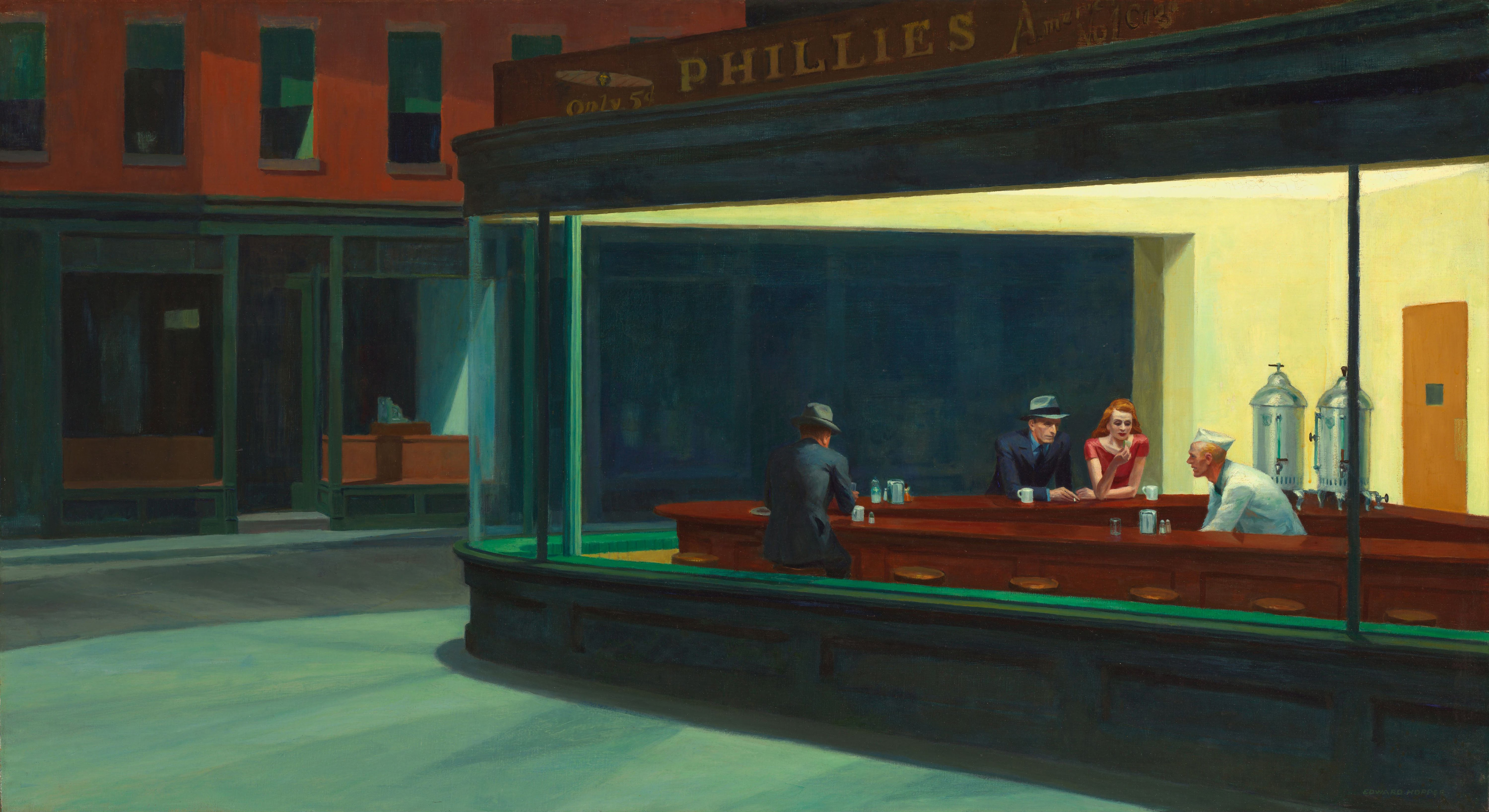
Nighthawks by Edward Hopper 1942

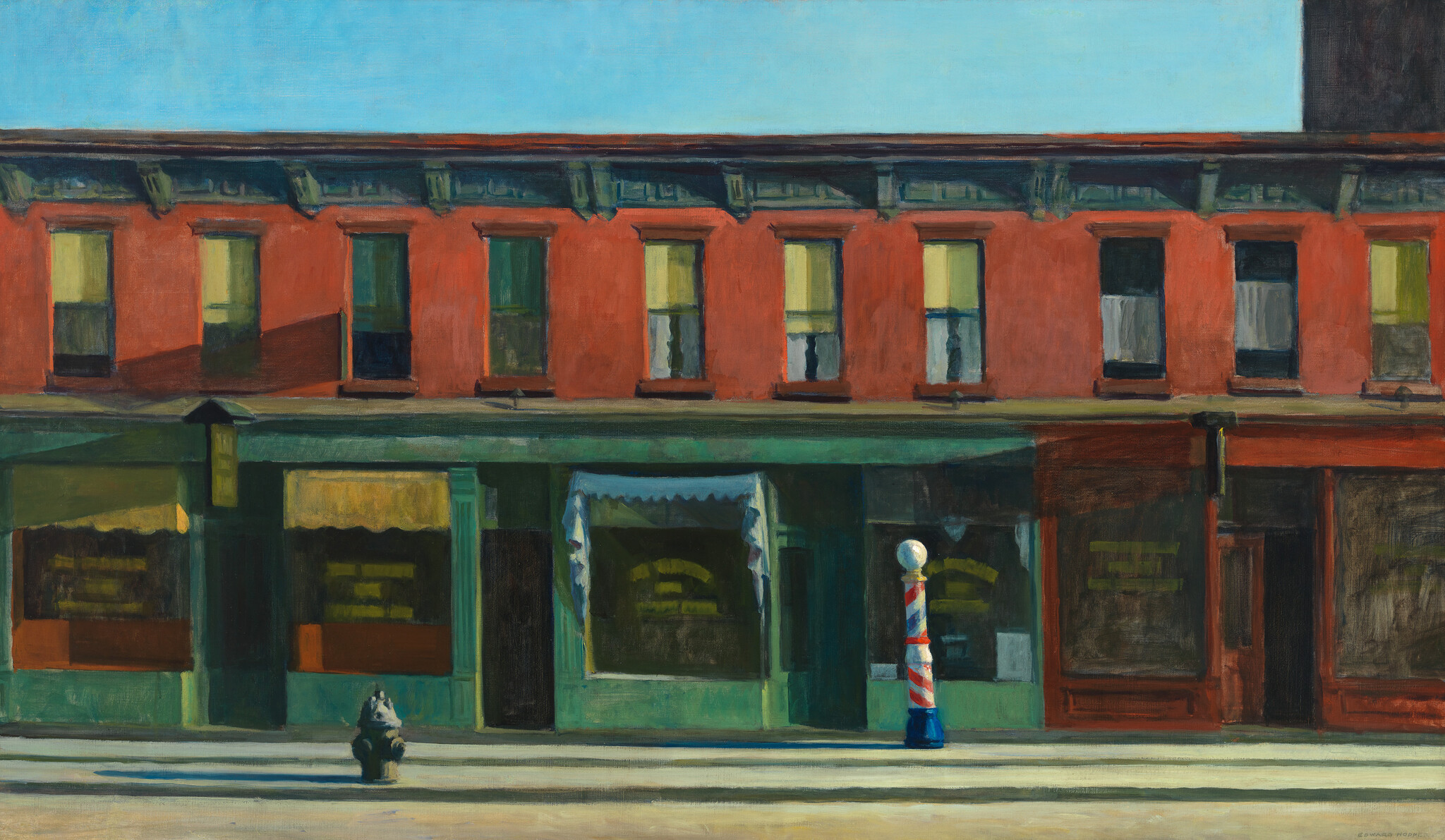
Early Sunday Morning by Edward Hopper 1930

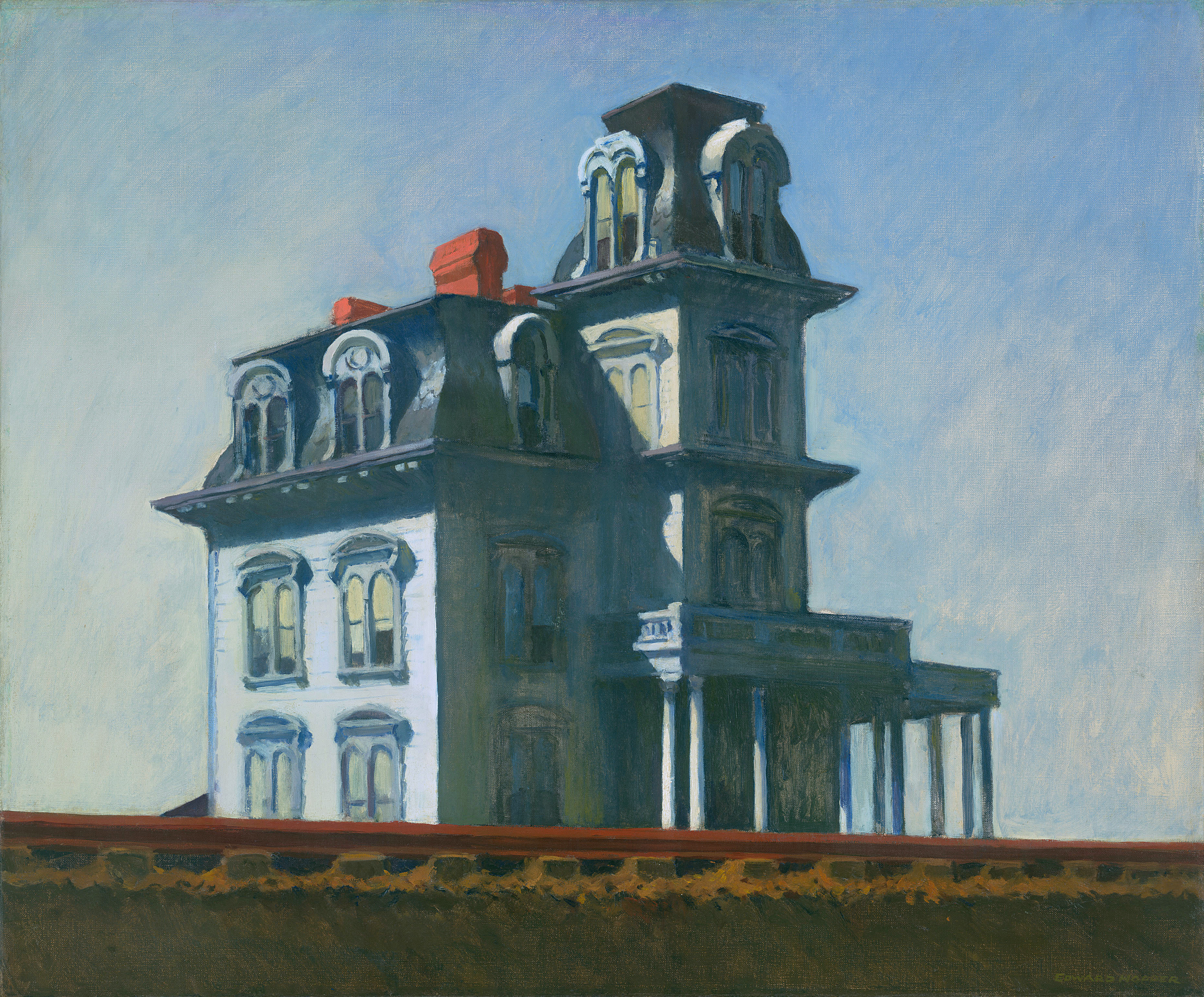
The House by the Railroad by Edward Hopper 1925

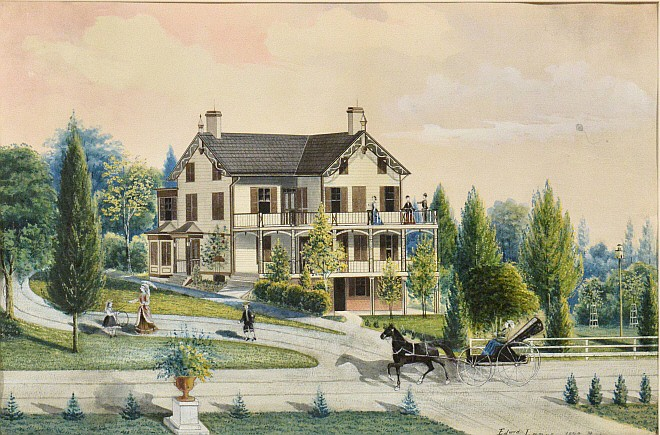
Edward Lange - Sumner Sturtevant's House in Nyack, New York

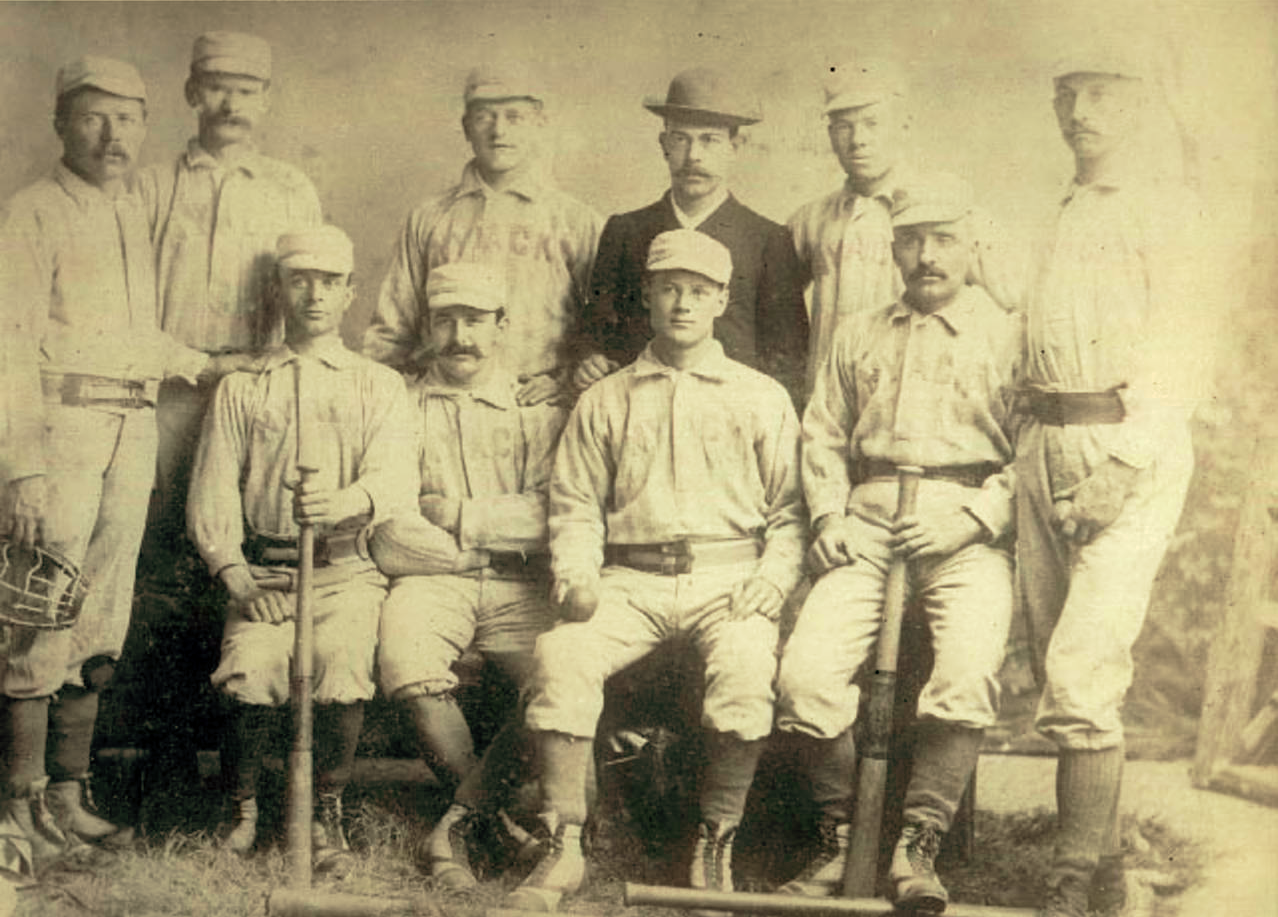
Nyack baseball team

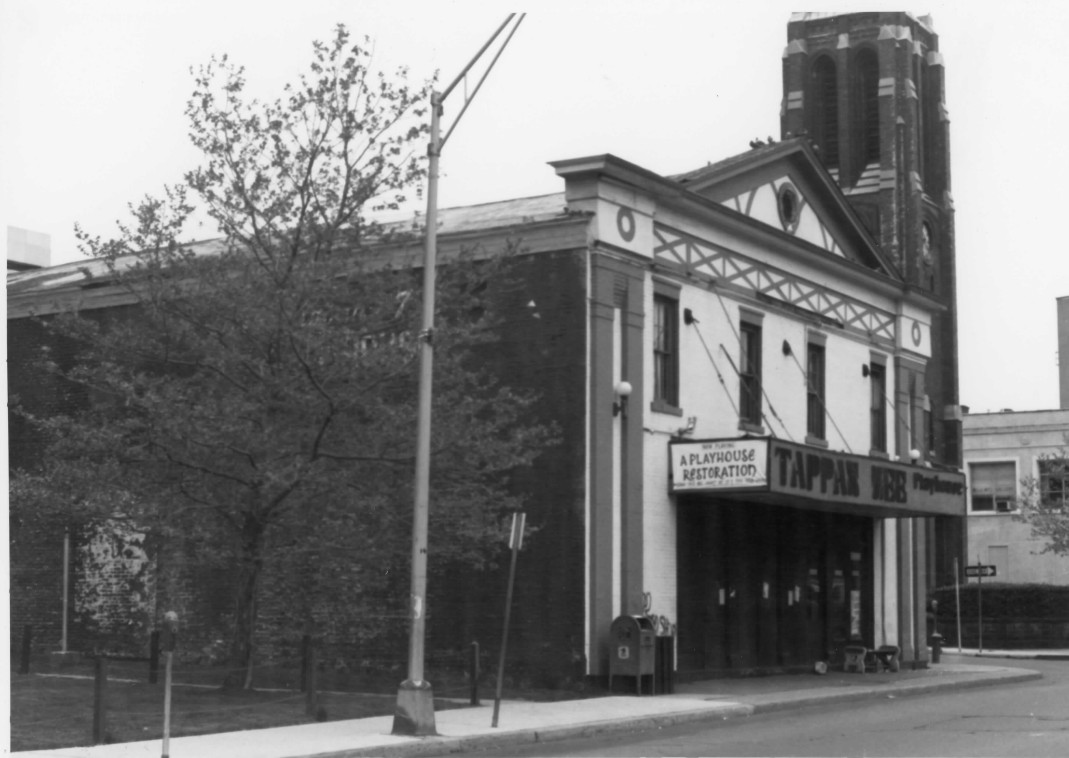
Tappan Zee Playhouse

=== Historical markers ===
- First Milestone from Nyack, Route 59 and Mountainview Avenue, Central Nyack
- Couch Court, 46 South Broadway
- Edward Hopper House Art Center, 82 North Broadway
- First Reformed Church, 18 South Broadway
- Historic Underground Railroad, 298 Main Street
- Historic Underground Railroad, 176 Main Street
- Memorial Park, Piermont and DePew Avenues
- Liberty Street School, Cornerstone Placement, Depew Avenue near Liberty Street
- Nyack First Settlement, 17 South Broadway
- Nyack Library, 59 South Broadway
- Oak Hill Cemetery, 140 North Highland Avenue
- "Pretty Penny," 235 North Broadway
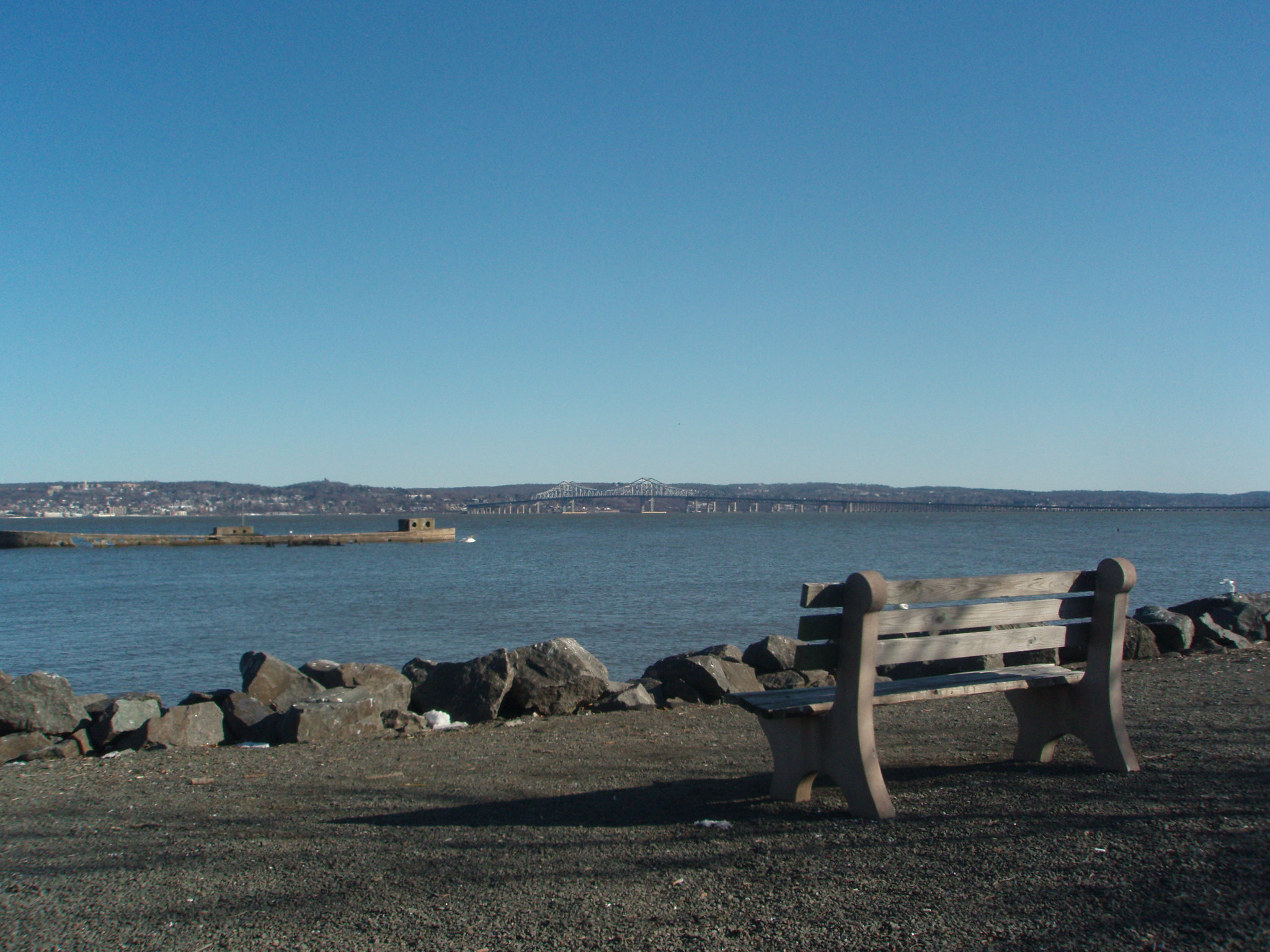
Memorial Park near the Hudson

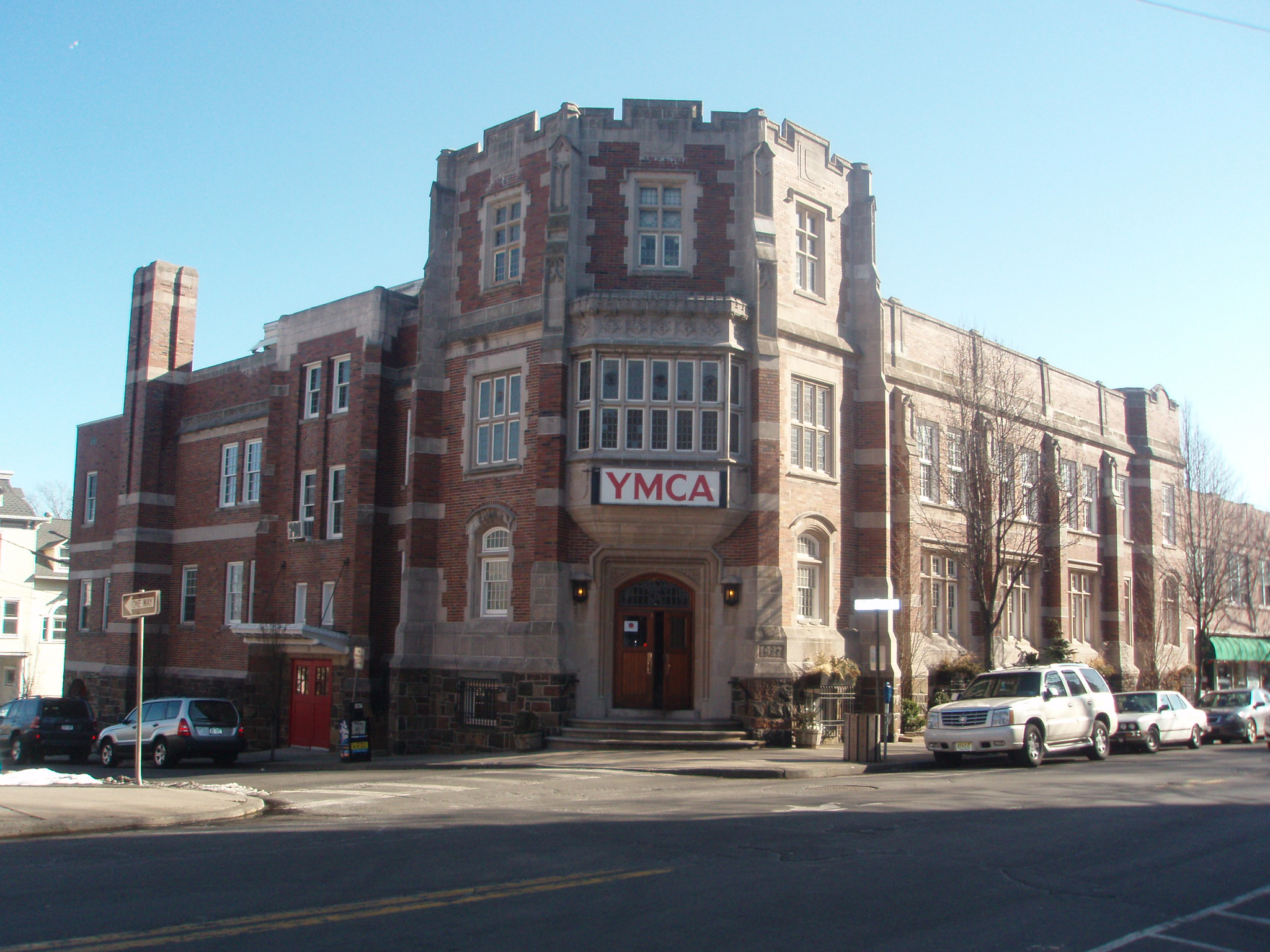
The old YMCA building, still standing

== Education ==
Nyack Public Schools serves Nyack. Nyack High School is the village's high school. Nyack was also home to Nyack College, a Christian liberal arts college and one of the four colleges in the United States affiliated with the Christian and Missionary Alliance church.

- Nyack Public Schools
  - In 2018, ranked 68 Best School Districts in Nyack by Niche's.
  - In 2021, Nyack Schools changed their mascot from the Indians to the Redhawks.

The Roman Catholic Archdiocese of New York operates Catholic schools in Rockland County. St. Ann Parish School in Nyack, staffed by the Sisters of St. Dominic, closed in 2003.

== In popular culture ==
Hannah Diamond, the heroine of the "Hannah" children's book series by Mindy Skolsky, lives near Nyack.

== Notable people ==
- Joseph Alessi, classical trombonist
- Caroline Lexow Babcock, suffragist and pacifist
- Stephen Baldwin, actor
- Thomas Berger, novelist
- Coheed and Cambria, rock band formed in 1995 in Nyack
- Joseph Cornell, artist and sculptor
- Welles Crowther, equities trader and 9/11 hero
- John Francis Daley, actor, musician, writer, and director
- Dorothy Delay, violinist and teacher
- Aaron T. Demarest, carriage manufacturer
- Jonathan Demme, director
- Audric Estimé, Denver Broncos running back
- Terrence Fede, Miami Dolphins defensive end
- Wilson P. Foss Jr., art collector and businessman
- Ryan Grant, NFL running back
- Bill Gunn, playwright, novelist, actor, and film director
- Helen Hayes, actress
- Matt Hennessy, NFL center for the Atlanta Falcons
- Edward Hopper, painter
- Michael E. Horowitz, United States Inspector General
- Joe Humeres, professional skateboarder
- Sakina Jaffrey, film and television actress
- Zita Johann, actress
- Van Johnson, actor
- Mondaire Jones, first openly gay Black congressman
- Mike Kellin, actor
- Joseph A. Komonchak, Roman Catholic priest and theologian
- Chuck Loeb, jazz musician
- George Marshall, conservationist
- Charles MacArthur, playwright
- James MacArthur, actor
- Devin McCourty, New England Patriots starting safety
- Jason McCourty, Miami Dolphins starting cornerback
- Carson McCullers, author
- Ingrid Michaelson, musician
- Toni Morrison, author
- Rosie O'Donnell, talk show host and actress
- Jansen Panettiere, actor and artist
- Regret the Hour, Indie rock band
- Norman Rose, stage, television, and film actor
- Charles Samuels, writer and journalist
- Michael S. Schmidt, journalist
- Jim Shooter, comic book writer and former EIC for Marvel comics
- Fabrizio Sotti, jazz guitarist and music producer
- Sub Urban, musician
- Henry D. Todd, U.S. Navy rear admiral
- Robert Ward, composer
- Sarah Weeks, author
- Rob Stoner, musician
- Salish Matter, Social media personality, entrepreneur and actress

== Gallery ==
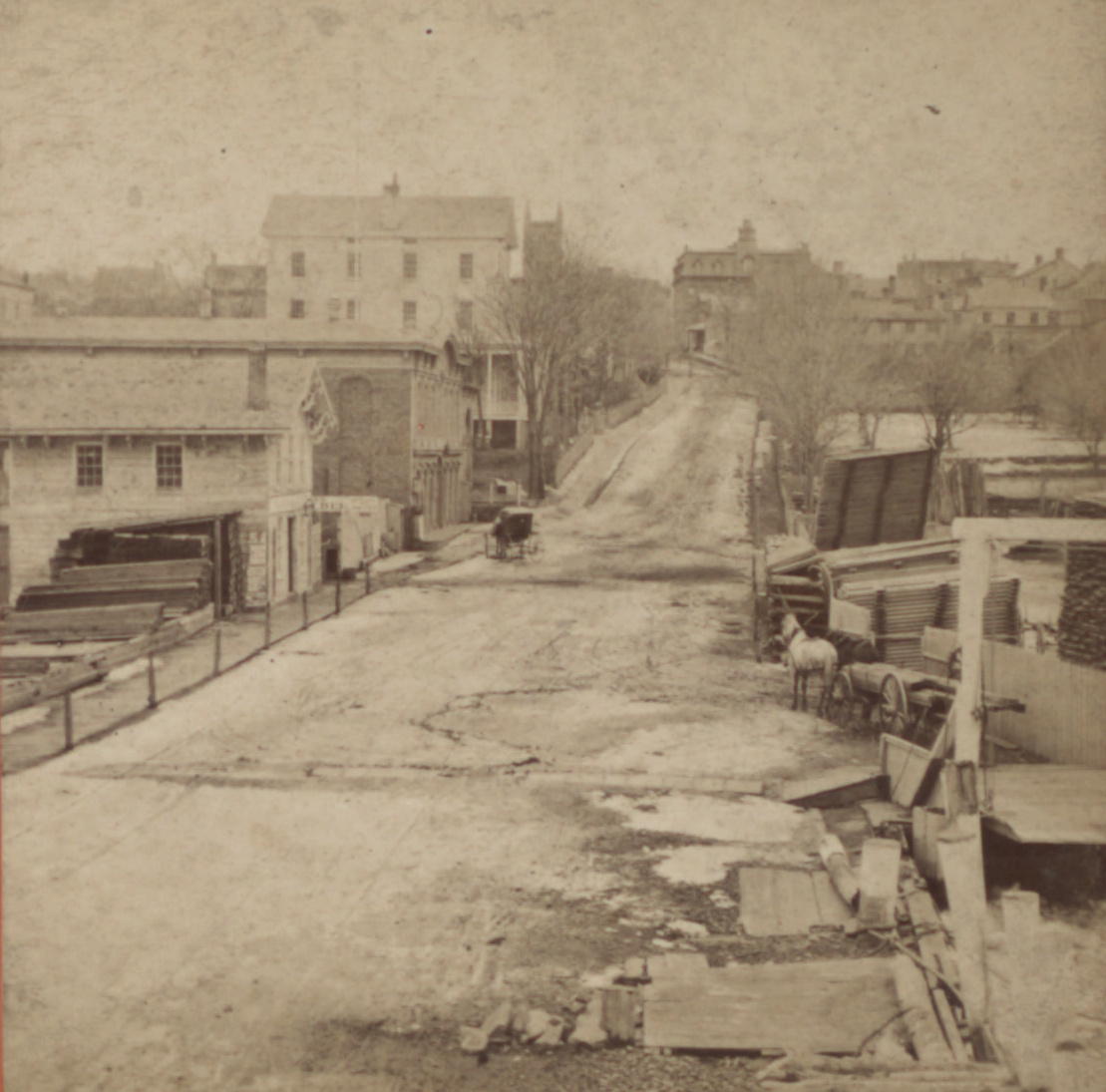
View of Nyack in the late 1800s

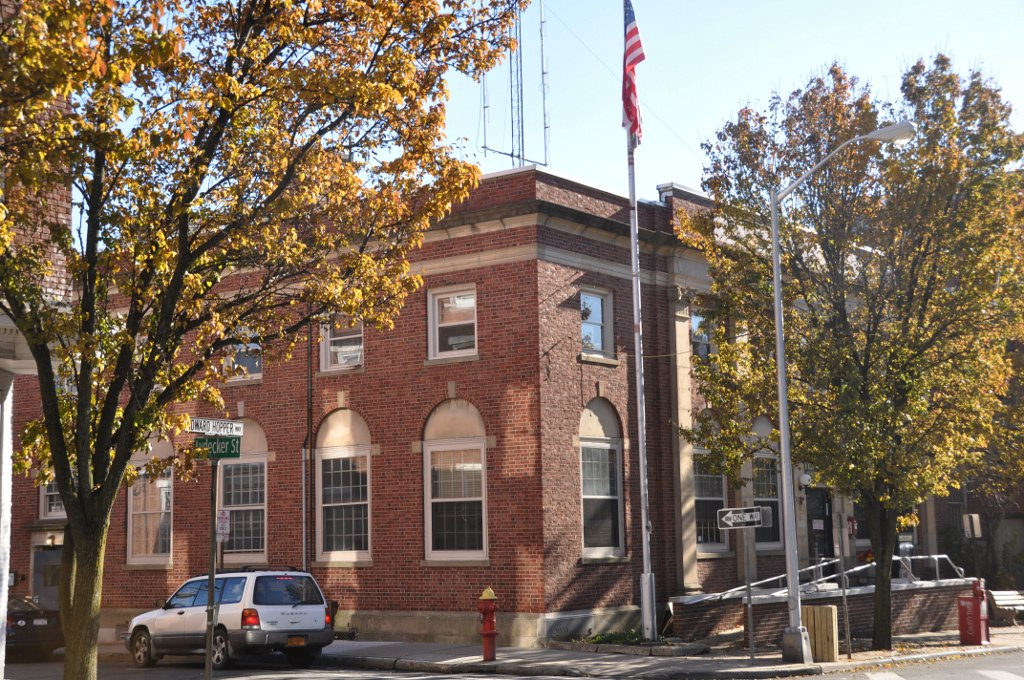
Nyack's Village Hall

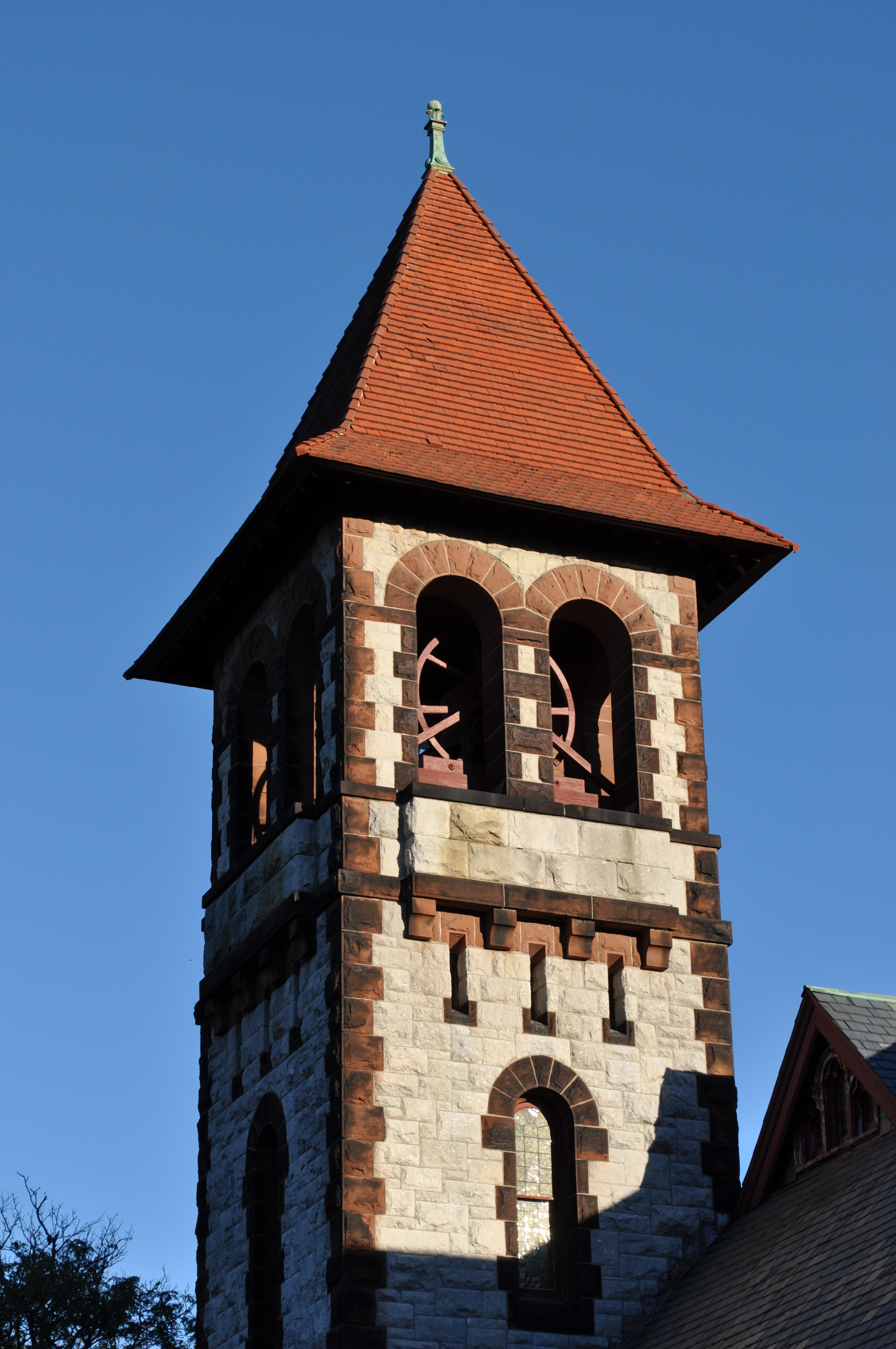
Saint Paul's United Methodist Church

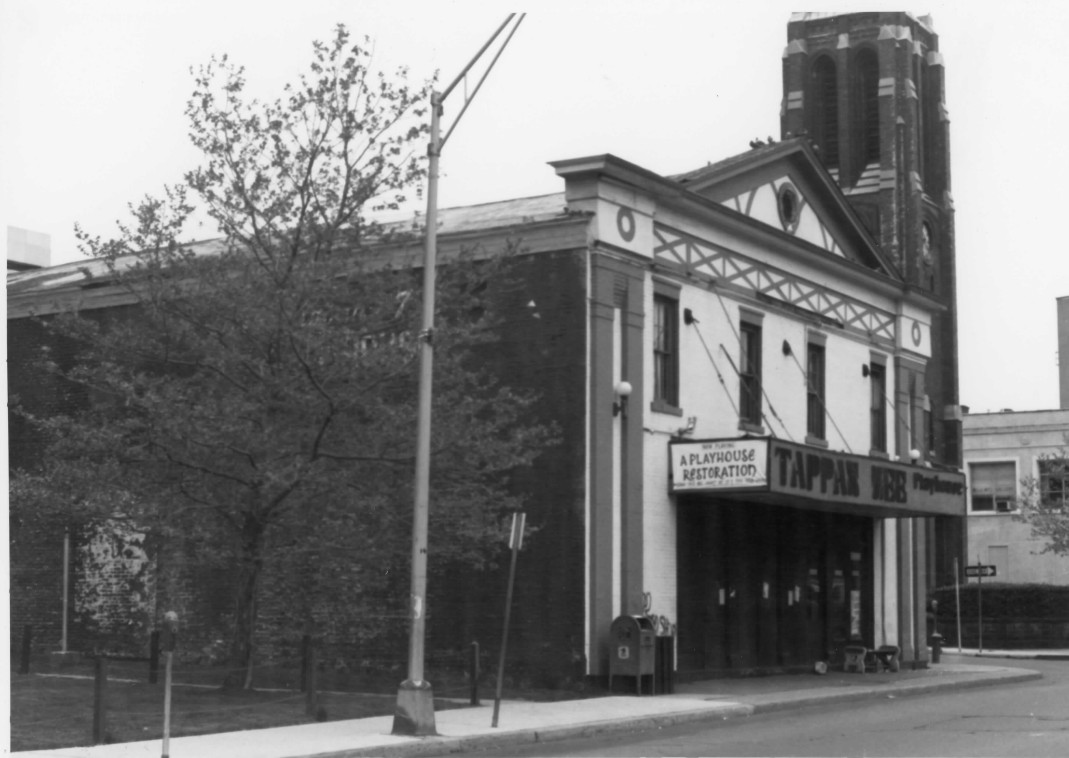
Tappan Zee Playhouse

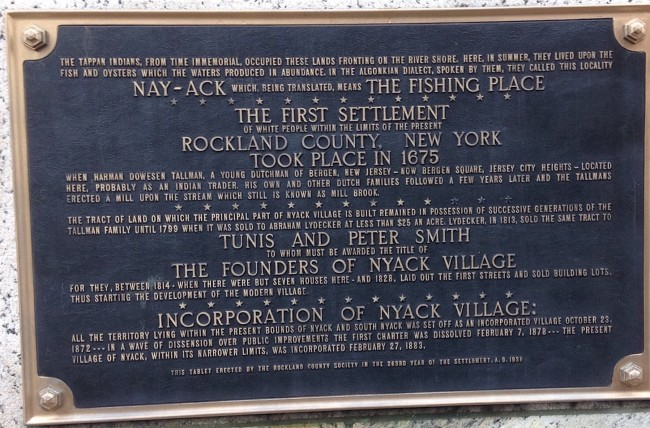
A commemorative plaque, mounted on the Burd Street side of the bank building located on South Broadway & Burd Street in Nyack. The inscription says "Nay-ACK, which being translated means THE FISHING PLACE...The First Settlement ...Rockland County, NY...took place in 1675."

== See also ==
- Brink's robbery (1981)
