= Nyack Library =

Coordinates: 41.088764°N 73.918459°W

The Nyack Library is a free association library located in the village of Nyack in New York State. Established in 1879, The Nyack Library serves the residents of Nyack, Upper Nyack, South Nyack, Grand View, and Valley Cottage. In 1890, the library was incorporated and on June 5, 1894, it was entered under the New York State Board of Regents, by which means it received state aid.

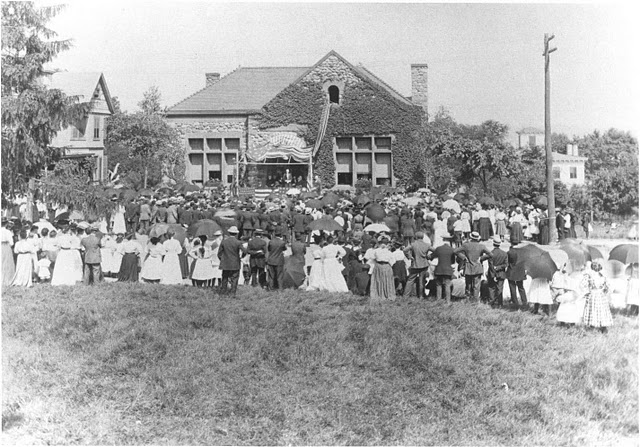
The dedication of the Lincoln Memorial Boulder which stands outside the Nyack Library

== Origin & history ==
In March 1901 the Trustees of the Nyack Library decided to petition Andrew Carnegie for funds for a library building. On December 21, 1901, Andrew Carnegie offered to give $15,000 for the erection of a library building in Nyack, if the village provided a suitable site and pledged by resolution to support the library with no less than $1,500 a year. On January 6, 1902, trustees of the library appeared before the Nyack village board to ask for an increase in funding by $187.50; the village had already been funding the library with $750 a year from 1894 - 1902. The new total was 937.50 annually. Carnegie offered to donate 15,000 for a building on the condition that the Nyack community raise not less than 1,500 annually.

== Construction and costs ==
The cornerstone for the new building was laid on May 21, 1903. The public reception for the opening of the new building was held on January 16, 1904. The total cost of the library was $15,597, almost $600 more than the gift of Andrew Carnegie. The cost of the furniture for the building was $950. The architects were the Emery Brothers and Mr. J. B. Simonson. The mason contractor was John M. Rooney. The carpentry was done by E.H. DeBaun. Plumbing and gas fitting was done by A.L. Henry. Painting and decorating was done by Hill and Hubbell. The library expanded in 1973, 1993, and 2010. The grand opening of the renovated Carnegie building and the new wing was on May 7, 2011.

== Staff union drive ==
In June 2017, 80% of Nyack Library staff signed a petition indicating their desire for union representation with the Nyack Library Staff Association/NYSUT-NEA/AFT. In response the Library administration retained the services of Jackson Lewis, a management-side law firm which specializes in "union prevention" services. On July 17, 2017, dozens of Library staff and more than 75 residents from the community crowded into the monthly meeting of the Library's board of trustees to urge board members to respect the employees' decision to organize and to manifest that respect by terminating Jackson Lewis as their legal counsel. A union vote, overseen by the National Labor Relations Board, was held on June 24, 2017. Nyack Library staff, community residents, and other supporters including a contingent from the New City Library Association gathered that evening to watch the Labor Board count the votes. The results were 33 in favor of unionization, 7 opposed with 3 ballots "challenged" by the Library and ultimately never counted because they were not determinative.
