= Georg Kopprasch =

German horn player and composer of popular etudes for horn study

Georg Kopprasch (c. 1800 – c. 1850) was a German composer and horn player primarily known for his second set of sixty horn studies (op. 6).

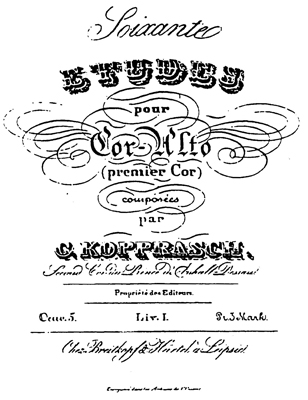
Original cover of first set of sixty horn etudes composed by Georg Kopprasch - incorrectly attributed to "C" Kopprasch

From a musical family, Kopprasch was the son of composer Wilhelm Kopprasch (c. 1750 – c. 1832) who was also a bassoonist in the orchestra of the Prince of Dessau. Georg Kopprasch was a member of the Prussian Regiment band and by 1822 played second horn in the Royal Theater in Berlin. By 1832 Kopprasch had returned to Dessau and played second horn in the court orchestra, where he likely spent the remainder of his career.

== Horn Etudes ==
Active in the Berlin horn playing scene in the early 1800s, Kopprasch was acquainted with the inventor of the valved horn, Heinrich Stölzel. Because horns could not play chromatically prior to Stölzel's invention of valves, no chromatic etudes existed for the horn and it is likely Kopprasch composed his now seminal works to fill that need.

Kopprasch wrote two sets of sixty etudes for horn, opus 5 for high horn and 6 for low horn, however only opus 6 (low horn) gained wide popularity, and is still published today—typically in two books of thirty each. Some early publications incorrectly attribute "C" Kopprasch. These etudes have also been transcribed for other brass instruments, such as trumpet, trombone and tuba.
