= Giuseppe Gariboldi =

Italian composer

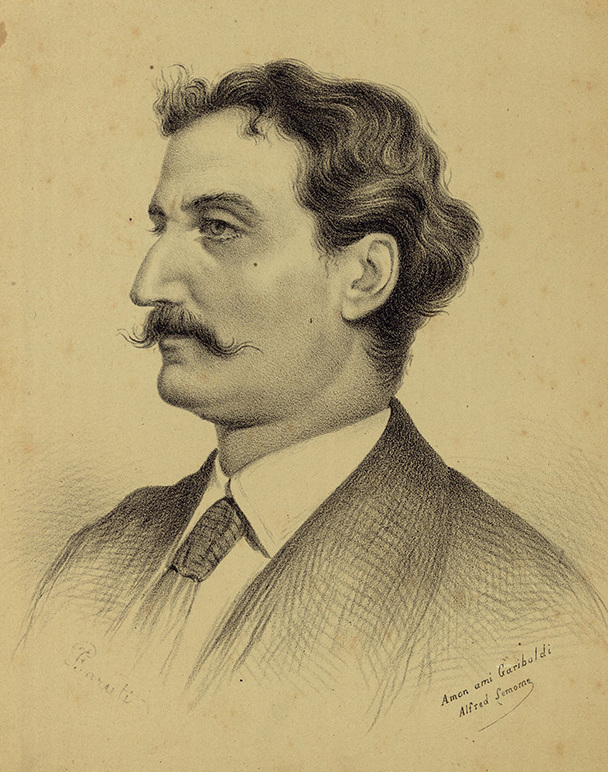
Giuseppe Gariboldi portrayed by F. Garuti

Giuseppe (Francesco Gabriele Patrizio Gaspare) Gariboldi (17 March 1833, Macerata – 12 April 1905, Castelraimondo) was an Italian flautist and composer.

In 1856, after studies with Giuseppe D'Aloe, he moved to Paris, where he worked as a composer and flute virtuoso. From 1859 to 1861, he concerted in Belgium, Netherlands, England and Austria. During the Franco-Prussian War, in 1870, he worked in the Red Cross. From 1871 to 1895, he taught flute and composition at the college Rollen (now Lycée Jacques-Decour) in Paris. In 1905, he returned with his family in Italy.

His works include numerous flute pieces (both solo and with piano accompaniment). A few of his studies and études are still used in teaching, namely Études mignonnes op. 131, 20 Petites Études op. 132, Exercices journaliers op. 89 and 15, and Études modernes et progressives. Gariboldi also composed many songs and three operettas.
