= Mathilda Enequist =

Swedish opera singer and singing instructor

Eugenia Mathilda Enequist (1833–1898), also known as Signora Biondini, was a Swedish opera singer and singing instructor.

Born in Visby, Gotland, Sweden, the daughter of a vicar, Johan Enequist, she was educated in Stockholm, Leipzig, and then in Paris, where she was instructed by Masset and Levasseur before she was employed in the Comédie-Italienne under the stage name Biondini (The Blonde), but soon moved to London, where she was a concert singer and singing instructor. Until 1879, she toured in Europe, also in her native Stockholm. She died, aged about 65, in London.
