= Još Hrvatska ni propala =

"Još Hrvatska ni propala" (English: "Croatia Has Not Yet Fallen") is a famous Croatian patriotic reveille which was penned by Ljudevit Gaj and set to music by the composer Ferdo Livadić in 1833. The song is considered the anthem of the Illyrian Movement, which constituted a great part of the Croatian national revival. The song is strikingly similar to Polish "Mazurek Dąbrowskiego".

Gaj's story of how the song came about was related in Franjo Kuhač's work Illyrian Musicians (Ilirski glazbenici). Travelling to Samobor to visit Livadić, Gaj thought to himself, "Croatia has not yet fallen so long as we [revivalists] are alive". At the same time he heard the sound of villagers singing in church. When he arrived at Livadić's house, he already had the words and melody ready. That night they penned several other verses, of which three became the best known and were treated as the unofficial anthem of the Illyrian Movement.

The song was first performed publicly on 4 February 1835 in a Zagreb theatre.

== Lyrics ==
Croatian

Još Hrvatska ni propala dok mi živimo,
visoko se bude stala kad ju zbudimo.
Ak je dugo tvrdo spala, jača hoće bit,
ak je sada u snu mala, će se prostranit.

Hura! nek se ori i hrvatski govori!

Ni li skoro skrajnje vrijeme da nju zvisimo,
ter da stransko teško breme iz nas bacimo?
Stari smo i mi Hrvati, nismo zabili
da smo vaši pravi brati, zlo prebavili.

Hura! nek se ori i hrvatski govori!

Oj, Hrvati braćo mila, čujte našu riječ,
razdružit nas neće sila baš nikakva već!
Nas je nekad jedna majka draga rodila,
hrvatskim nas, Bog joj plati, mlijekom dojila.

Hura! nek se ori i hrvatski govori!

English translation

Croatia has not yet fallen while we live,
it will rise high when we revive it.
If it's slept this hard and long, it will grow stronger,
if it's so small in its sleep, it will expand.

'Hurrah!' let it resound, spoken in Croatian!

Isn't it high time to uplift her,
and throw away the heavy foreign burden?
Us Croats, we are old too, we did not forget
that we are your true brethren, regardless of the evil.

'Hurrah!' let it resound, spoken in Croatian!

Oh, Croats, dear brothers, hear us when we say,
there is no force that will separate us now!
One dear mother gave birth to us once,
breastfed us Croatian milk, thank God for that.

'Hurrah!' let it resound, spoken in Croatian!
