= Deaths in August 2015 =

The following is a list of notable deaths in August 2015.

Entries for each day are listed alphabetically by surname. A typical entry lists information in the following sequence:

- Name, age, country of citizenship and reason for notability, established cause of death, reference.

== August 2015 ==
=== 1 ===
- Stephan Beckenbauer, 46, German footballer (Bayern Munich), brain tumur.
- Cilla Black, 72, British singer ("Anyone Who Had a Heart", "You're My World", "Step Inside Love") and TV presenter (Blind Date, Surprise Surprise, The Moment of Truth), stroke following a fall.
- Ian Bryans, 62, Canadian football player (Edmonton Eskimos, Toronto Argonauts, Hamilton Tiger-Cats).
- Bernard d'Espagnat, 93, French theoretical physicist and philosopher of science.
- A. B. M. Elias, 71, Bangladesh army general.
- Michael D. Flinn, 74, American politician.
- Bob Frankford, 76, Canadian politician.
- Mates Friesel, 91, American politician, mayor and founder of New Square, New York (since 1961).
- Hank Izquierdo, 84, Cuban baseball player (Minnesota Twins).
- Hong Yuanshuo, 67, Chinese football player and coach (Beijing Guoan), colorectal cancer.
- Vincent Marotta, 91, American entrepreneur, co-creator of Mr. Coffee.
- Sheperd Paine, 69, American military historian and modeler, stroke.
- Chiara Pierobon, 22, Italian professional cyclist, suspected pulmonary embolism.
- Alta Walker, 73, American geologist.
- Kevin Whyman, 39, English rower and pilot, plane crash.

=== 2 ===
- Benton Becker, 77, American lawyer.
- Forrest Bird, 94, American Hall of Fame aviator and inventor.
- Giovanni Conso, 93, Italian jurist, Minister of Justice (1993–1994).
- Sammy Cox, 91, Scottish footballer (Rangers, national team).
- Tyler Drumheller, 63, American CIA agent, pancreatic cancer.
- Piet Fransen, 79, Dutch footballer (FC Groningen, national team).
- Phyllis Grosskurth, 91, Canadian biographer.
- Mahmoud Guinia, 64, Moroccan Gnawa musician.
- Stephen Huss, 47, Canadian musician (Psyche).
- Ken Jones, 85, Welsh author and Buddhist activist.
- Ken Lewis, 74, English singer and songwriter (Can't You Hear My Heartbeat), complications from diabetes.
- Robert Lukens, 42, American historian and collection manager (United States Capitol Visitor Center), President of the Chester County Historical Society (since 2011), cancer.
- Natalia Molchanova, 53, Russian free diver.
- J. Durward Morsch, 94, American composer.
- Jacques Navadic, 95, French journalist and broadcasting editor.
- Adolphe Nshimirimana, 50, Burundian general, Army chief of staff, rocket attack.
- Sir Sydney Schubert, 87, Australian public servant.
- June Schwarcz, 97, American enamel artist.
- Jack Spring, 82, American baseball player (Los Angeles Angels), Parkinson's disease.
- Içami Tiba, 74, Brazilian psychiatrist and writer.

=== 3 ===
- Hiroyuki Agawa, 94, Japanese writer.
- Jean Aicardi, 88, French neurologist.
- Salvatore Cassisa, 93, Italian Roman Catholic prelate, Archbishop of Monreale (1978–1997).
- Robert Conquest, 98, British-born American historian (The Great Terror), pneumonia.
- Francois Drummer, 76, South African cricketer.
- Mel Farr, 70, American football player (Detroit Lions).
- Coleen Gray, 92, American actress (Nightmare Alley, Kiss of Death, The Killing).
- Chris Hyndman, 49, Canadian TV personality (Steven and Chris), fall.
- Carol Brown Janeway, 71, British-born American editor and translator (The Reader), cancer.
- Frank Kerns, 82, American college basketball coach (Georgia Southern).
- Margot Loyola, 96, Chilean folk singer and musician.
- Cynthia Macdonald, 87, American poet, heart failure.
- Lynn Manning, 60, American poet, playwright and actor (Seinfeld, 8 Simple Rules), liver cancer.
- John Henry Merryman, 95, American legal scholar.
- Jef Murray, 55, American fantasy artist.
- Kevin O'Leary, 95, Australian judge.
- Johanna Quandt, 89, German businesswoman and billionaire.
- Giovanni Riggi, 90, American mobster, inspiration for The Sopranos.
- Arnold Scaasi, 85, Canadian fashion designer.
- Alf Schwarz, 80, Canadian sociologist.
- Ambros Seelos, 80, German musician and conductor.

=== 4 ===
- Takashi Amano, 61, Japanese aquarist and photographer, pneumonia.
- Ken Barnes, 82, British writer and record producer.
- Irvin Castille, 89, American baseball player (Birmingham Black Barons).
- Arthur Dorward, 90, Scottish rugby union player.
- Theo van Els, 79, Dutch linguist.
- Yosef Goldman, 73, American book dealer and author.
- Irving Harper, 99, American industrial designer.
- Achim Hill, 80, German rower, two-time Olympic silver medalist (1960, 1964).
- Elsie Hillman, 89, American politician and philanthropist.
- Bo Huff, 72, American custom car designer, multiple myeloma.
- Les Munro, 96, New Zealand pilot, last surviving pilot of Operation Chastise.
- Gerd Natschinski, 86, German composer.
- Sam Odaka, 86, Ugandan diplomat and politician, Foreign Minister (1964–1971).
- Calle Örnemark, 81, Swedish sculptor.
- John Rudometkin, 75, American basketball player (New York Knicks, San Francisco Warriors), lung disease.
- Siegfried Schnabl, 88, German psychotherapist.
- Billy Sherrill, 78, American record producer (Tammy Wynette, George Jones, Charlie Rich).
- Lela Swift, 96, American television director (Dark Shadows, Ryan's Hope).

=== 5 ===
- Svetlana Boym, 56, Soviet-born American scholar and author, cancer.
- Simon Burrows, 86, British Anglican prelate, Bishop of Buckingham (1974–1994).
- George Cole, 90, English actor (Minder, St Trinian's, Cleopatra).
- Ana Hatherly, 86, Portuguese writer and artist.
- Mark Herdman, 83, British diplomat, Governor of the British Virgin Islands (1986–1991).
- Joyce Ingalls, 65, American actress (Paradise Alley).
- Arthur Walter James, 103, British journalist, editor of the Times Educational Supplement (1952–1969).
- Joseph Kainrad, 83, American judge and politician.
- Kiripi Katembo, 36, Congolese photographer and documentary filmmaker, malaria.
- James Herbert Laycraft, 91, Canadian lawyer and judge, Chief Justice of the Alberta Court of Appeal (1985–1991).
- Raphy Leavitt, 66, Puerto Rican composer and orchestra leader, complications of surgery for artificial hip infection.
- Antti Leppänen, 67, Finnish Olympic ice hockey player (1976), (Tappara).
- Tony Millington, 72, Welsh footballer (Swansea City, Peterborough United, national team).
- Nuri Ok, 72, Turkish judge, Chief Prosecutor of the Court of Cassation (2003–2007).
- Onell Soto, 82, Cuban-born Anglican prelate, Bishop of the Diocese of Venezuela.
- Akira Tanno, 89, Japanese photographer.
- Johnny Tiger Jr., 75, American artist.
- Ellen Vogel, 93, Dutch actress (The Knife, Zonder Ernst, Twin Sisters).
- Zygfryd Weinberg, 85, Polish Olympic triple jumper.
- Herbert Wise, 90, Austrian-born British television, theatre and film director (I, Claudius, Breaking the Code).

=== 6 ===
- Mircea Dobrescu, 84, Romanian flyweight boxer, Olympic silver medalist (1956).
- Bradley M. Glass, 84, American politician.
- Danny Hegan, 72, Northern Irish footballer (Ipswich Town, Wolves, national team), cancer.
- Ray Hill, 39, American football player (Miami Dolphins), colon cancer.
- Iraj Kiarostami, 52, Iranian Olympic boxer.
- Ulla Lindkvist, 75, Swedish orienteer.
- Geoff Mardon, 87, New Zealand speedway rider.
- Frederick R. Payne Jr., 104, American brigadier general.
- Amado Pineda, 77, Filipino meteorologist, cardiac arrest.
- Orna Porat, 91, German-born Israeli theater actress.
- Charl van den Berg, 33, South African model, Mr Gay World 2010, lymphoma.

=== 7 ===
- Sólveig Anspach, 54, Icelandic-born French film director (Lulu femme nue), cancer.
- Trevor Barber, 90, New Zealand cricketer (Wellington, Central Districts, national team).
- Tibor Beerman, 89, Czech-born American architect.
- Manuel Contreras, 86, Chilean general, head of Dirección de Inteligencia Nacional, convicted of crimes against humanity, multiple organ failure.
- Saud al-Dosari, 46, Saudi television presenter (MBC), heart attack.
- Terrence Evans, 81, American actor (Terminator 2: Judgment Day, Star Trek, The Texas Chainsaw Massacre).
- Art Finley, 88, American broadcaster, heart attack.
- Lee Seng Wee, 85, Singaporean banker, businessman and billionaire.
- Samuil Lurie, 73, Russian literary historian.
- John McPhedran, 65, Canadian Olympic wrestler.
- Jerome G. Miller, 83, American youth social worker.
- Bob Morton, 81, American politician.
- Neville Neville, 65, British cricketer and football club director (Bury F.C.), heart attack.
- Frances Oldham Kelsey, 101, Canadian-born American physician, Food and Drug Administration reviewer.
- Ludwig Ott, 78, German water polo player.
- Jerry Snell, 56, Canadian actor and musician.
- Ulrich P. Strauss, 95, German-born American chemist.
- Louise Suggs, 91, American Hall of Fame professional golfer, co-founder of LPGA.
- Uggie, 13, American canine actor (The Artist, Water for Elephants, The Campaign), euthanized.
- Wei Jianxing, 84, Chinese politician.

=== 8 ===
- Sir Alec Atkinson, 96, British WWII air force officer and civil servant.
- Jean Cole, 89, American journalist (Boston Record American).
- Chris Decker, 73, Canadian politician, cancer.
- David Dill, 60, American politician, member of the Minnesota House of Representatives (since 2003), cancer.
- Ronald Gordon, 88, British Anglican prelate, Bishop of Portsmouth (1975–1984) and Bishop at Lambeth (1984–1992).
- Jack Jackson, 90, Canadian ice hockey player (Chicago Blackhawks).
- Jennifer Jackson, 63, Canadian Olympic speed skater.
- Christopher Marshall, 66, British cancer researcher, colorectal cancer.
- Ann McGovern, 85, American author, cancer.
- Nancy Morrison, 88, American tennis player.
- Gus Mortson, 90, Canadian ice hockey player (Toronto Maple Leafs, Chicago Black Hawks).
- Mauk Moruk, 60, East Timorese rebel commander, shot.
- Sean Price, 43, American rapper (Heltah Skeltah, Boot Camp Clik).
- Susan Sheridan, 68, English actress and voice artist (The Black Cauldron, The Hitchhiker's Guide to the Galaxy, Noddy's Toyland Adventures), breast cancer.
- Abner Shimony, 87, American physicist and philosopher.
- Alan Wakeman, 79, British author and gay rights activist.
- Sam S. Walker, 90, American army general.
- Farida Yasmin, 75, Bangladeshi playback singer.

=== 9 ===
- Alice and the Glass Lake, 28, American singer, acute myeloid leukemia.
- Rasim Aliyev, 30, Azerbaijani journalist, internal bleeding from a beating.
- Marco Antonio Andino, 60, Honduran politician, MP (since 2006), heart attack.
- Astaire, 4, Irish-bred British-trained thoroughbred racehorse, colic.
- Audrey Auld-Mezera, 51, Australian-born American country singer, cancer.
- Jean Byrne, 88, American educator, First Lady of New Jersey (1974–1982), babesiosis.
- Mike Colandro, 62, American professional golfer.
- Asmund Ekern, 85, Norwegian biologist.
- Jim Gaffney, 94, American football player (Washington Redskins).
- Frank Gifford, 84, American Hall of Fame football player (New York Giants) and broadcaster (Monday Night Football).
- Jack Gold, 85, British film director (The Naked Civil Servant, Aces High, The Medusa Touch).
- John Henry Holland, 86, American computer scientist.
- Don Kent, 71, American blues historian and record collector.
- George E. R. Kinnear II, 87, American navy admiral.
- Pietro Armando Lavini, 88, Italian Capuchin friar and conservationist.
- Walter Nahún López, 37, Honduran footballer, shot.
- David Nobbs, 80, British novelist and comedy writer (The Fall and Rise of Reginald Perrin, The Two Ronnies, Fairly Secret Army).
- Jonathan Ollivier, 38, British ballet dancer, traffic collision.
- Fikret Otyam, 88, Turkish painter and journalist, renal failure.
- Kayyar Kinhanna Rai, 100, Indian independence activist, author, poet and journalist, pneumonia.
- Wang Jiexi, 25, Chinese actor, leukaemia.

=== 10 ===
- Ranjana Ash, 90, Indian-born British writer.
- Buddy Baker, 74, American Hall of Fame NASCAR driver and commentator (CBS Sports), lung cancer.
- Sydney Butchkes, 94, American visual artist.
- Endre Czeizel, 80, Hungarian geneticist, leukemia.
- Sunil Das, 76, Indian artist.
- Fred Eckhardt, 89, American beer expert.
- Sergio Espinosa, 86, Chilean footballer.
- Herbert Fielding, 92, American politician, member of the South Carolina Senate (1985–1992).
- Boris Gostev, 87, Russian politician, Minister of Finance of the Soviet Union (1985–1989).
- Hubert Haenel, 73, French politician and magistrate, member of the Constitutional Council (since 2010).
- Cleo Hill, 77, American basketball player (St. Louis Hawks).
- Karst Hoogsteen, 91, Dutch-born American biochemist.
- Biff Liff, 96, American theatrical agent.
- Oscar Lukefahr, 76, American Catholic priest and author.
- Donald P. McInnes, 81, Canadian politician.
- Knut Osnes, 93, Norwegian football player and manager (Lyn).
- David Shelley, 57, American blues rock musician, cancer.
- Mary Perry Smith, 89, American mathematician.
- Edward Thomas, 95, American police officer.
- Eriek Verpale, 63, Belgian writer.

=== 11 ===
- Serge Collot, 91, French violist.
- Eddie Cusic, 89, American blues musician, prostate cancer.
- Utta Danella, 95, German author. (death announced on this date)
- Jim Freeman, 101, American football player and coach (Ball State Cardinals).
- Randy Glasbergen, 58, American cartoonist (The Better Half), cardiac arrest.
- Leon R. Hartshorn, 86, American theologian and author.
- Arturo Macapagal, 72, Filipino Olympic shooter (1972, 1976), prostate cancer.
- William J. Moore, 92, American politician.
- George A. Murphy, 92, American politician, New York State Senator (1971–1972), Assemblyman (1973–1978) and Supreme Court judge (1978–1997), complications of a stroke.
- Harald Nielsen, 73, Danish footballer (Bologna, national team).
- Richard Oriani, 95, El Salvador-born American chemical engineer.
- Bhalchandra Pendharkar, 93, Indian actor.
- Nour El-Sherif, 69, Egyptian actor and conspiracy theorist, lung cancer.
- Richard S. Ross, 91, American cardiologist.
- Anne Strieber, 68, American author and editor.
- Magomed Suleimanov, 39, Russian Islamist, Emir of the Caucasus Emirate (2015).
- Philip Arthur Whitcombe, 92, English cricketer and army officer.
- Wendell Wood, 65, American environmental activist, co-founder of Oregon Wild, heart attack.
- Don Yoder, 93, American folklorist.

=== 12 ===
- Per Hjort Albertsen, 96, Norwegian composer.
- Paul Antrobus, 80, Canadian Baptist minister and psychologist.
- Jim Bradley, 82, American football coach.
- Jaakko Hintikka, 86, Finnish philosopher and logician.
- Ali Hassanein, 76, Egyptian actor, liver cancer.
- Radhey Shyam Kori, 76, Indian politician.
- Stephen Lewis, 88, British comedy actor (On the Buses, Last of the Summer Wine, Don't Drink the Water).
- Meshulim Feish Lowy, 94, Hungarian-born Canadian rabbi.
- Chris Marustik, 54, Welsh footballer (Swansea City, Cardiff City, Newport County, national team).
- Kim Nelson, 57, Australian artist, heart attack.
- John Scott, 59, English organist and choirmaster, cardiac arrest.
- Frank Scully, 95, Australian politician.
- Martin Sostre, 92, American activist.
- Ihor Yeremeyev, 47, Ukrainian politician, member of the Verkhovna Rada (2002–2005, since 2012), head injury.

=== 13 ===
- Watban Ibrahim al-Tikriti, 62–63, Iraqi politician, Interior Minister of Iraq (1991–1995), heart attack.
- Bill Aswad, 93, American politician, member of the Vermont House of Representatives (1995–2012).
- Steve Brennan, 56, English footballer (Crystal Palace).
- Paul Danquah, 90, British actor (A Taste of Honey).
- Bob Fillion, 95, Canadian ice hockey player (Montreal Canadiens).
- Danford B. Greene, 87, American film editor (MASH, Blazing Saddles, Who's Harry Crumb?).
- Jan Montyn, 90, Dutch artist.
- Om Prakash Munjal, 86, Indian chief executive.
- John A. Nerud, 102, American Thoroughbred horse trainer and owner.
- Harold Ousley, 86, American jazz saxophonist.
- Bob Parsons, 73, Australian rules footballer (Footscray).
- Shlomo Smiltiner, 99, Israeli chess player.
- Joe N. Wilson, 92, American politician.

=== 14 ===
- Leo de Bever, 85, Dutch architect.
- Edward T. Brennan, 88, American politician.
- Agustín Cejas, 70, Argentine footballer (Racing Club), Alzheimer's disease.
- Dickinson R. Debevoise, 91, American judge, U. S. District Court Judge for New Jersey (1979–1994).
- Bob Farrell, 87, American restaurateur and motivational speaker, founder of Farrell's Ice Cream Parlour.
- Leo Antony Gleaton, 67, American photographer, oral cancer.
- Hans Hüneke, 81, German Olympic athlete.
- Bob Johnston, 83, American record producer (Johnny Cash, Bob Dylan, Leonard Cohen).
- Lavanam, 86, Indian social reformer.
- Joseph Reid, 97, Canadian politician.
- Sanco Rembert, 91, American bishop.
- Rogelio Ricardo Livieres Plano, 69, Argentinian-born Paraguayan Roman Catholic prelate, Bishop of Ciudad del Este (2004–2014), diabetes.
- Karen Stives, 64, American equestrian, Olympic champion and silver medallist (1984).
- Jazz Summers, 71, English music manager (Scissor Sisters, The Verve, Snow Patrol), lung cancer.
- Arnaldo Carlos de Vasconcelos França, 89, Cape Verdean politician, minister of finance (1990–1991).
- Ethel Tobach, 93, American psychologist.

=== 15 ===
- Jean Bikomagu, Burundian military officer, Army Chief of Staff during the Burundian Civil War, shot.
- Julian Bond, 75, American civil rights activist and politician, chairman of the NAACP (1998–2010), complications of vascular disease.
- Rafael Chirbes, 66, Spanish writer, lung cancer.
- Malcolm Craddock, 77, British television producer (Sharpe).
- Doc Daugherty, 87, American baseball player (Detroit Tigers).
- Jorge de la Rúa, 73, Argentine lawyer and politician.
- John Ewington, 79, British insurance underwriter, Chairman of the Guild of Church Musicians (1978-2014).
- Guy Garman, 56, American physician and scuba diver, drowned.
- Hamid Gul, 80, Pakistani army officer, brain haemorrhage.
- Gordy Holz, 82, American football player (Denver Broncos, New York Jets).
- Bill Kushner, 84, American poet.
- Geoff McGivern, 84, Australian footballer (Melbourne F.C.).
- Manuel Mendívil, 79, Mexican equestrian, Olympic medalist (1980).
- Ibtihal Salem, 66, Egyptian author.
- Danny Sembello, 52, American songwriter ("Neutron Dance") and record producer, drowned.
- Derwyn Shea, 77, Canadian politician, cancer.
- Bud Thomas, 86, American baseball player (St. Louis Browns).

=== 16 ===
- Jacob Bekenstein, 68, Mexican-born Israeli-American theoretical physicist.
- Norman Bigelow, 71, American illusionist, leukemia.
- Melva Bucksbaum, 82, American art collector, bladder cancer.
- Alfred Burrows, 63, Indian cricketer.
- Jon Craig, 73, New Zealand architect.
- Emma Didlake, 110, American WWII soldier.
- Joan Fawcett, 78, Canadian politician.
- Sylvia Hitchcock, 69, American model and beauty queen (Miss Universe 1967), cancer.
- Anna Kashfi, 80, Indian-born British actress.
- Shuja Khanzada, 71, Pakistani politician, member of the Provincial Assembly of the Punjab (2002–2007, since 2008), bombing.
- Jack Larsen, 91, American politician.
- Katia Loritz, 82, Swiss-born Spanish actress.
- Kitty McGeever, 48, British actress (Emmerdale), diabetic retinopathy and kidney failure.
- George Merchant, 89, Scottish footballer (Dundee FC, Falkirk FC).
- Mile Mrkšić, 68, Serbian Yugoslav military officer and convicted war criminal.
- David A. Prior, 59, American film director (Zombie Wars, Raw Justice, Deadly Prey).
- Lenny B. Robinson, 51, American Batman impersonator, traffic collision.
- Peter W. Schramm, 68, Hungarian-born American political scientist, cancer.
- Draga Stamejčič, 78, Slovenian Yugoslav athlete.
- Lyubov Volkova, 82, Soviet Olympic skier.

=== 17 ===
- Loek Alflen, 81, Dutch wrestler.
- Butz Aquino, 76, Filipino politician, member of the Senate (1987–1995) and the House of Representatives from Makati's Second District (1998–2007).
- Verner Bertelsen, 97, American politician.
- William B. Bonnor, 94, British physicist and mathematician, heart attack.
- Beata Brookes, 84, British politician, MEP for North Wales (1979–1989).
- Yvonne Craig, 78, American actress (Batman, Star Trek, Olivia), breast cancer.
- Arsen Dedić, 77, Croatian singer.
- Kay Floyd, 67, American horse breeder, complications from a heart attack.
- Mike Gaechter, 75, American football player (Dallas Cowboys), heart failure.
- George Gair, 88, New Zealand politician and diplomat, MP for North Shore (1966–1990), Mayor of North Shore City (1995–1998), High Commissioner to the UK (1991–1994).
- Gilles Gauthier, 79, Canadian politician.
- Eduardo Guerrero, 87, Argentine rower, Olympic champion (1952), pneumonia.
- Sandy Kennon, 81, South African footballer (Norwich City).
- Gerhard Mayer-Vorfelder, 82, German football executive (UEFA, VfB Stuttgart) and politician.
- László Paskai, 88, Hungarian Roman Catholic prelate, Archbishop of Esztergom-Budapest (1987–2002), Cardinal (1988–2015).
- Bernard Rodrigues, 82, Singaporean politician, co-founder of PAP and NTUC, Member of Parliament for Telok Blangah (1965–1968).
- Dahd Sfeir, 83, Uruguayan actress.
- Albert Vërria, 78, Albanian actor.

=== 18 ===
- Karolyn Ali, 70, American film producer (Tupac: Resurrection).
- Khaled al-Asaad, 83, Syrian scholar, head of antiquities in Palmyra, beheaded.
- Nils Bølset, 87, Norwegian diplomat.
- Hugh Courtenay, 18th Earl of Devon, 73, British landowner and peer.
- Vladimír Filo, 75, Slovak Roman Catholic prelate, Bishop of Rožňava (2008–2015).
- Russell Henderson, 91, Trinidadian-born British jazz musician.
- Joan Miller Lipsky, 96, American politician.
- Kay McFarland, 80, American judge, Kansas Supreme Court Justice (1977–2009).
- Rama Messinger, 46, Israeli actress and voice actress, cancer.
- Suvra Mukherjee, 74, Indian philosopher and dancer, First Lady (since 2012), respiratory failure.
- Donald E. O'Brien, 91, American judge, U. S. District Court Judge for the Southern District of Iowa (1978–1990) and the Northern District, (1978–1992).
- Charles Read, 57, British mathematician.
- Edgar Rumney, 78, English footballer (Colchester United).
- Joe Skibinski, 86, American football player (Green Bay Packers).
- Roger Smalley, 72, British-born Australian composer, Parkinson's disease.
- William Jay Smith, 97, American poet.
- Louis Stokes, 90, American politician, member of the U.S. House of Representatives from Ohio (1969–1999), lung and brain cancer.
- Abu Muslim al-Turkmani, Iraqi member of Mujahideen Shura Council, senior deputy commander and primary coordinator of ISIS, airstrike.
- Bud Yorkin, 89, American film and television producer (All in the Family, Blade Runner, Sanford and Son) and actor.

=== 19 ===
- Nazzal al-Armouti, 91, Jordanian civil servant, diplomat and politician.
- Egon Bahr, 93, German politician.
- Paravoor Bharathan, 86, Indian actor.
- Ole Jacob Frich, 61, Norwegian politician, cancer.
- Fernand Grosjean, 91, Swiss Olympic alpine skier (1948, 1952).
- George Houser, 99, American Methodist minister and civil rights activist.
- Paul Lokiru Kalanda, 88, Ugandan Roman Catholic prelate, Bishop of Moroto (1980–1991) and Fort Portal (1991–2003).
- Amy Kass, 74, American academic, complications from leukemia and ovarian cancer.
- Antonio Larreta, 92, Uruguayan writer and actor.
- Danny Lotz, 78, American basketball player (North Carolina Tar Heels).
- Sanat Mehta, 90, Indian politician.
- Russell Poole, 58, American police detective (LAPD), heart attack.
- Doudou N'Diaye Rose, 85, Senegalese drummer, composer and bandleader.
- Leonard A. Sawyer, 90, American politician, member of the Washington House of Representatives (1955-1975).
- Suharno, 55, Indonesian football player and coach, heart attack.
- Chitranjan Swaroop, 69, Indian politician.

=== 20 ===
- Khalid Hassan Abbas, 79, Sudanese army general and politician.
- Moza Sultan Al Kaabi, 31, Emirati orthopedic surgeon, traffic collision.
- Lars Amble, 76, Swedish actor and director, cancer.
- D. Dudley Bloom, 92, American businessman.
- Zuzana Brabcová, 56, Czech author.
- Veronica Brady, 86, Australian nun and academic.
- Lev Durov, 83, Russian actor.
- Kenneth Jennings, 90, American choral conductor and composer.
- Patrick Kavanagh, 85, Irish rugby union player and swimmer.
- Paul Kibblewhite, 74, New Zealand pulp and paper scientist.
- Lina Morgan, 78, Spanish actress and showgirl.
- Melody Patterson, 66, American actress (F Troop), multiple organ failure.
- Daniel Reimold, 34, American journalism professor (Saint Joseph's University), journalist (PBS MediaShift) and blogger.
- W. Paul Tippett Jr., 82, American businessman.
- Harry Volkman, 89, American meteorologist, respiratory failure.
- Frank Wilkes, 93, Australian politician, member of the Victorian Legislative Assembly for Northcote (1957–1988), Leader of the Opposition (1977–1981).

=== 21 ===
- Ton Alblas, 75, Dutch politician, member of the House of Representatives (2002–2003).
- Colin Beyer, 76, New Zealand lawyer and businessman.
- Jimmy Evert, 91, American tennis player and coach, Canadian Open champion (1947), pneumonia.
- Sir Bob Hepple, 81, South African-born British legal scholar, Master of Clare College, Cambridge (1993–2003).
- Denise Marshall, 53, British equal rights campaigner, cancer.
- Jimmy Massey, 85, American racing car driver.
- Sasha Petraske, 42, American cocktail bar entrepreneur.
- Daniel Rabinovich, 71, Argentine musician and comedian (Les Luthiers).
- Jere Ratcliffe, 78, American Chief Scout Executive of the Boy Scouts of America (1993–2000).
- Ruth Sivard, 99, American economist, dementia.
- Gerry Steinberg, 70, British politician, MP for City of Durham (1987–2005).
- Toby Sheldon, 34, American television reality star (Botched, My Strange Addiction), multiple drug intoxication.
- Wang Dongxing, 99, Chinese politician, Vice Chairman of the Communist Party (1977–1980).

=== 22 ===
- Mariem Hassan, 57, Western Saharan singer, bone cancer.
- Keith K. Hilbig, 73, American Mormon general authority.
- Ieng Thirith, 83, Cambodian Khmer Rouge politician, Minister of Social Affairs (1975–1979), complications from Alzheimer's disease.
- Tommy Lowry, 69, English footballer (Crewe Alexandra).
- Andy Mapple, 52, British water skier, heart attack.
- Arthur Morris, 93, Australian Test cricketer.
- Merl Reagle, 65, American crossword compiler (San Francisco Chronicle), acute pancreatitis.
- Stephen Rodefer, 74, American poet and painter.
- William L. Rowe, 84, American philosopher.
- Jörg Schneider, 80, Swiss actor (Usfahrt Oerlike) and comedian, liver cancer.
- Josef Steger, 90, Swiss Olympic sprinter.
- Marion Boulton Stroud, 76, American museum director (The Fabric Workshop and Museum).
- Eric Thompson, 95, British racing driver.
- Charles Tomlinson, 88, English poet and poetry translator.
- Inez Trueman, 98, Canadian politician.
- Lou Tsioropoulos, 84, American basketball player (Boston Celtics).
- Tatu Vanhanen, 86, Finnish political scientist.
- Jakub Zabłocki, 31, Polish footballer, heart attack.
- Erika Zuchold, 68, German gymnast, Olympic bronze (1968) and silver (1968, 1972) medalist.

=== 23 ===
- Gaston Adjoukoua, 57, Ivorian footballer.
- Augusta Chiwy, 94, Congolese-born Belgian nurse, volunteer in the Siege of Bastogne.
- Mark Costello, 59, American politician, Oklahoma Labor Commissioner (since 2011), stabbed.
- Ricardo García Sainz, 85, Mexican administrator and politician, Federal deputy (1997–2000).
- Helen Kemp, 97, American singing teacher and choir director.
- Grover Klemmer, 94, American athlete (California Golden Bears) and track coach (CCSF).
- Guy Ligier, 85, French rugby union player (national team), racing driver and Formula One team owner (Équipe Ligier).
- Eugenio Méndez Docurro, 92, Mexican politician and engineer, Secretary of Communications and Transportation (1970–1976).
- Mary Lou Parks, 76, American politician.
- Yosi Piamenta, 63, Israeli musician, cancer.
- Enrique Reneau, 44, Honduran footballer, respiratory failure.
- Paul Royle, 101, Australian prisoner-of-war, escapee from Stalag Luft III.
- Michel Varga, 88, Hungarian-born French political activist.

=== 24 ===
- Niels Henrik Arendt, 64, Danish Church of Denmark prelate, Bishop of Haderslev (1999–2013).
- Eric Barry, 88, Canadian army officer, Lord Prior of St John (2002-2008).
- John H. Beynon, 91, Welsh chemist and physicist.
- Marcy Borders, 42, American 9/11 survivor, subject of "Dust Lady" photograph, stomach cancer.
- Cummy Burton, 79, Canadian ice hockey player (Detroit Red Wings).
- Charlie Coffey, 81, American football player and coach (Virginia Tech Hokies), cancer.
- Peter Ebinger, 56, Austrian Olympic equestrian.
- Horacio García, 83, Uruguayan Olympic sailor.
- Peter Gatenby, 92, Irish professor of clinical medicine.
- Cees van Kooten, 67, Dutch footballer (Go Ahead Eagles, national team), esophageal cancer.
- B. B. Lees, 84, American football coach.
- Alison Magaya, South Sudanese politician and diplomat.
- Chico Maki, 76, Canadian ice hockey player (Chicago Blackhawks).
- Marguerite McDonald, 73, Canadian radio and television journalist, cancer.
- David Michie, 87, French-born British painter.
- Sándor Nagy, 68, Hungarian politician, MP (1980–1985, 1988–1990, 1994–2006).
- Venkatesh Nayak, 79, Indian politician, member of the Legislative Assembly for Karnataka (since 2013), train derailment.
- Bevo Nordmann, 75, American basketball player (Cincinnati Royals, St. Louis Hawks, New York Knicks), cancer.
- Nathan Rosenberg, 87, American economist.
- Vardo Rumessen, 73, Estonian musicologist and politician, member of the Riigikogu (1992–1995, 1999–2003).
- Gerhard Spiegler, 85, Lithuanian-born American academic.
- Heino Thielemann, 91, German Olympic field hockey player.
- Joseph F. Traub, 83, American computer scientist.
- Justin Wilson, 37, British IndyCar Series driver, head injuries from race collision.
- Annette Worsley-Taylor, 71, British fashion promoter.

=== 25 ===
- Mario Aguiñada Carranza, 73, Salvadoran activist and politician, MP (1991–1994).
- José María Benegas, 67, Spanish politician, cancer.
- Gaetano Aldo Donato, 74, American Roman Catholic prelate, Auxiliary Bishop of Newark (since 2004).
- James "Red" Duke, 86, American trauma surgeon.
- Hermann Dür, 90, Swiss Olympic equestrian.
- Endre Fejes, 91, Hungarian writer.
- James L. Flanagan, 89, American electrical engineer, heart failure.
- Colin Fry, 53, British medium and television presenter, lung cancer.
- Mascarenhas, 78, Angolan footballer.
- Frank E. Petersen, 83, American military officer, lung cancer.
- Francis Sejersted, 79, Norwegian history professor, chairman of the Norwegian Nobel Committee (1991–1999).
- Ian Smith, 90, South African cricketer.

=== 26 ===
- Georges Abi-Saber, 92, Lebanese-born Canadian Maronite hierarch, Bishop of Latakia (1977–1986) and Saint Maron of Montreal (1990–1996).
- Amelia Boynton Robinson, 104, American civil rights activist, multiple strokes.
- Donald Eric Capps, 76, American theologian, traffic collision.
- Jim Chrest, 76, American politician.
- Keith Everitt, 92, Canadian politician, MLA for St. Albert (1971–1979).
- Camellia Johnson, 61, American opera singer, heart failure.
- Geraint Stanley Jones, 79, Welsh television executive, controller of BBC Wales (1981–1989), chief executive of S4C (1989–1994).
- P. J. Kavanagh, 84, English poet and actor.
- Peter Kern, 66, Austrian actor and filmmaker (The Last Summer of the Rich).
- Stefanos Manikas, 63, Greek politician, Minister of State (2001–2003), cancer.
- Reggie McGowan, 50, American football player (New York Giants).
- Owe Nordqvist, 87, Swedish Olympic cyclist.
- Carmelo Domênico Recchia, 93, Italian-born Brazilian Roman Catholic prelate, last Territorial Abbot of Claraval (1976–1999).
- Maroun Khoury Sader, 88, Lebanese Maronite hierarch, Archbishop of Tyre (1992–2003).
- Francisco San Diego, 79, Filipino Roman Catholic prelate, Bishop of San Pablo (1995–2003) and Pasig (2003–2010).
- Duane Sommers, 82, American politician, complications from a series of strokes.
- Győző Soós, 66, Hungarian politician, MP (1994–2006).
- David M. Stanley, 86, American politician.
- Dashdorjiin Tserentogtokh, 64, Mongolian Olympic wrestler.
- Barbara Vann, 76, American theatre director and actress.
- Anita Yeckel, 72, American politician, member of the Missouri Senate (1997–2005), heart disease.
- American journalists killed as a result of the WDBJ shooting:
  - Vester Flanagan, 41, reporter (WTOC, WTWC, WDBJ) and gunman, suicide by gunshot.
  - Alison Parker, 24, reporter (WDBJ), shot.
  - Adam Ward, 27, cameraman (WDBJ) and photojournalist, shot.

=== 27 ===
- Adebowale Adefuye, 68, Nigerian diplomat, Ambassador to the United States (since 2010), heart attack.
- Kazi Zafar Ahmed, 76, Bangladeshi politician, Prime Minister (1989-1990).
- Francis Allegra, 57, American lawyer and judge, brain cancer.
- Monique Berlioux, 89, French Olympic swimmer.
- Matei Boilă, 89, Romanian politician and Greek Catholic priest, Senator (1992–2000).
- Pascal Chaumeil, 54, French director (Heartbreaker, A Long Way Down, A Perfect Plan), cancer.
- George Cleve, 79, Austrian-born American musical conductor, liver failure.
- Darryl Dawkins, 58, American basketball player (Philadelphia 76ers, New Jersey Nets), heart attack.
- Mervyn Edmunds, 83, New Zealand cricketer.
- Joan Garriga, 52, Spanish motorcycle racer, traffic collision.
- James A. Hefner, 76, American educator, President of Tennessee State University (1991–2005), colon cancer.
- Gino Hollander, 91, American artist, heart attack.
- Zafar Hussain Mirza, 88, Pakistani judge.
- Rolf Nitzsche, 84, German Olympic cyclist (1956).
- Marc Rosenberg, 65, Canadian judge, brain cancer.
- Willy Stähle, 61, Dutch water skier, Olympic (1972) and world champion (1971).

=== 28 ===
- Juan Amores, 51, Costa Rican Olympic athlete.
- Jan Anderson, 83, New Zealand scientist.
- Al Arbour, 82, Canadian ice hockey player (Chicago Blackhawks, St. Louis Blues) and Hall of Fame coach (New York Islanders).
- John Buckingham, 72, British chemist.
- James H. Carson Jr., 80, American politician.
- Lindsay Charnock, 60, British jockey.
- Buddy Cook, 89, American professional golfer.
- Roger Ferriter, 82, American graphic designer.
- Teresa Gorman, 83, British politician, MP for Billericay (1987-2001).
- Mark Krasniqi, 94, Kosovan ethnographer and politician.
- Daryl Laub, 90, American television and radio personality.
- Joan Lind, 62, American rower, two-time Olympic silver medalist (1976, 1984), brain cancer.
- Paulo Machava, 61, Mozambican journalist, shot.
- Wally McArthur, 81, Australian rugby league player (Rochdale Hornets).
- Ray Miron, 92, Canadian ice hockey executive (Central Hockey League, Toronto Maple Leafs, Colorado Rockies).
- Roland Mqwebu, 74, South African actor.
- Nasser Pourpirar, 75, Iranian writer and revisionist historian.
- Nelson Shanks, 77, American painter, cancer.
- Józef Wesołowski, 67, Polish defrocked Roman Catholic prelate, archbishop and Vatican envoy to the Dominican Republic (2008–2013).

=== 29 ===
- Endre Alexander Balazs, 95, Hungarian-born American ophthalmologist, stroke.
- Robin Bilbie, 73, English cricketer (Nottinghamshire).
- Carlos María Ariz Bolea, 86, Spanish-born Panamanian Roman Catholic prelate, Vicar Apostolic of Darién (1981–1988) and Bishop of Colón-Kuna Yala (1988–2005).
- William McCormick Blair Jr., 98, American diplomat, Ambassador to Denmark (1961–1964) and the Philippines (1964–1967), hypertension.
- Noah Davis, 32, American painter, soft tissue cancer.
- Wayne Dyer, 75, American self-help author and motivational speaker, leukemia.
- Milorad Ekmečić, 86, Serbian historian.
- Joy Golden, 85, American advertising executive.
- Margaret Hurley, 105, American politician, member of the Washington House of Representatives (1953–1979) and Senate (1979–1984).
- Kyle Jean-Baptiste, 21, American theater actor (Les Misérables), fall.
- Graham Leggat, 81, Scottish footballer (Aberdeen, Fulham, national team).
- Nikolaus Lehnhoff, 76, German opera director.
- Jean Louvet, 80, Belgian playwright.
- Luo Lan, 95, Taiwanese writer and radio personality, cardiopulmonary failure.
- Frankie Rivera, 38, American native rights activist, brain cancer.
- Ron Searle, 96, British-born Canadian politician, Mayor of Mississauga (1976–1978).
- Sir Kenneth Stowe, 88, British civil servant.
- Archie Sutton, 73, American football player (Minnesota Vikings).

=== 30 ===
- Brad Anderson, 91, American cartoonist (Marmaduke).
- Carlos Barrionuevo, 37, Argentine footballer, drowned.
- Charlie Carlson, 71, American novelist, actor and film producer.
- Wes Craven, 76, American film director, writer and producer (A Nightmare on Elm Street, Scream, The Hills Have Eyes), brain cancer.
- Bart Cummings, 87, Australian racehorse trainer, twelve-time winner of the Melbourne Cup.
- Blondell Cummings, 70, American modern dancer and choreographer.
- Edward Fadeley, 85, American attorney and politician, heart failure.
- George Fisher, 90, English footballer (Millwall, Colchester United).
- Brian Hord, 81, British chartered surveyor and politician, MEP for London West (1979–1984).
- John Hotop, 85, New Zealand rugby union player (Bush, Manawatu, Canterbury, Otago, national team).
- Dan Iordăchescu, 85, Romanian baritone.
- M. M. Kalburgi, 76, Indian writer and academic, shot.
- Rhoda Lerman, 79, American author and playwright, thyroid cancer.
- Marvin Mandel, 95, American politician, Governor of Maryland (1969–1979), Speaker of the House of Delegates (1964–1969).
- J. Donald Millar, 81, American physician and public-health official, kidney failure.
- Eileen O'Brien, 93, American baseball player (Muskegon Lassies).
- Joshua Park, 38, American theater actor (The Adventures of Tom Sawyer).
- Pierfranco Pastore, 88, Italian Roman Catholic prelate, Secretary for Social Communications (1984–2003).
- George Hamilton Pearce, 94, American-born Fijian Roman Catholic prelate, Archbishop of Suva (1967–1976).
- Hugo Rasmussen, 74, Danish jazz musician.
- Oliver Sacks, 82, British neurologist and author (The Man Who Mistook His Wife for a Hat, Awakenings, Hallucinations), liver cancer.
- Héctor Silva, 75, Uruguayan footballer, heart attack.
- Natalia Strelchenko, 38, Russian-born Norwegian concert pianist, head and neck injuries.
- Mikhail Svetin, 84, Ukrainian-born Russian actor.
- Ali Tabatabaei, 31, Iranian actor, heart attack.
- David Williamson, Baron Williamson of Horton, 81, British civil servant and peer, Convenor of the Cross-Bench Peers (2004–2007).

=== 31 ===
- Joy Beverley, 91, British singer (Beverley Sisters), stroke.
- Barbara Brecht-Schall, 84, German actress.
- Jack Garrity, 89, American ice hockey player.
- Bob Johnson, 80, American politician.
- Cipe Lincovsky, 85, Argentine actress (The Girlfriend, Poor Butterfly).
- Edward Montagu, 3rd Baron Montagu of Beaulieu, 88, British peer, founder of the National Motor Museum.
- Vera B. Rison, 76, American politician, member of the Michigan House of Representatives (1997-2003).
- Tom Scott, 84, American football player (Philadelphia Eagles, New York Giants).
- Islam Timurziev, 32, Russian boxer, sepsis.
- Edward J. Wasp, 92, American engineer and inventor.
