= Frisette (wig) =

Short wig, often worn covered

A frisette is a "short wig usually made of synthetic hair or a human and synthetic blend."

== Usage ==
Use of this word regarding "dressing the hair" was already established by 1867.

One description of how it's worn is called "tilted frisette."

Frisettes are worn, for religious reasons, by Orthodox Jewish women as hair coverings. A comparison of head coverings compiled by The Jewish Telegraphic Agency wrote that they are "cropped above the ear and covered with a tichel, leaving only bangs visible on the forehead." Communities where frisettes are most likely to be seen include New Square, Kiryas Joel, "and to a lesser degree Monsey and Williamsburg."

Some arrange the wig's hair bangs so that they are positioned "against the forehead" or, alternatively, they are "side-swept".

== See also ==
- Wigs#Judaism
