= Magaya =

Magaya may refer to

- Alison Magaya (died 2015), South Sudanese politician and diplomat
- Cosmas Magaya (1953–2020), Zimbabwean mbira player, teacher and cultural ambassador
- Walter Magaya (born 1983), Zimbabwean sect leader and self-proclaimed prophet
