= London West =

London West could refer to:

- London West (federal electoral district), Canada
- London West (provincial electoral district), Canada
- London West (European Parliament constituency), United Kingdom

== See also ==
- West London (disambiguation)
