= Lenny Robinson =

Lenny Robinson may refer to:

- Lenny B. Robinson (1963–2015), real-life Batman impersonator
- Charlene Robinson, a fictional character from the Australian soap opera Neighbours
