= Soós =

Soós may refer to:

- Árpád Soós (zoologist) (1912–1991), Hungarian zoologist
- Bela Soós (1930–2007), Romanian chess player
- Edit Soós (1934–2008), Hungarian actress
- Győző Soós, (1948–2015), Hungarian politician
- Imre Soós (1930–1957), Hungarian actor
- Károly Soós (Minister of Defence) (1869–1953), Hungarian military officer
- Viktória Soós, (b 1985) Hungarian handballer
- A matriclan of the Serer people. See Serer maternal clans ( Soos)

== See also ==
- Soos (disambiguation)
