= Michael Elliott (politician) =

British politician (born 1932)

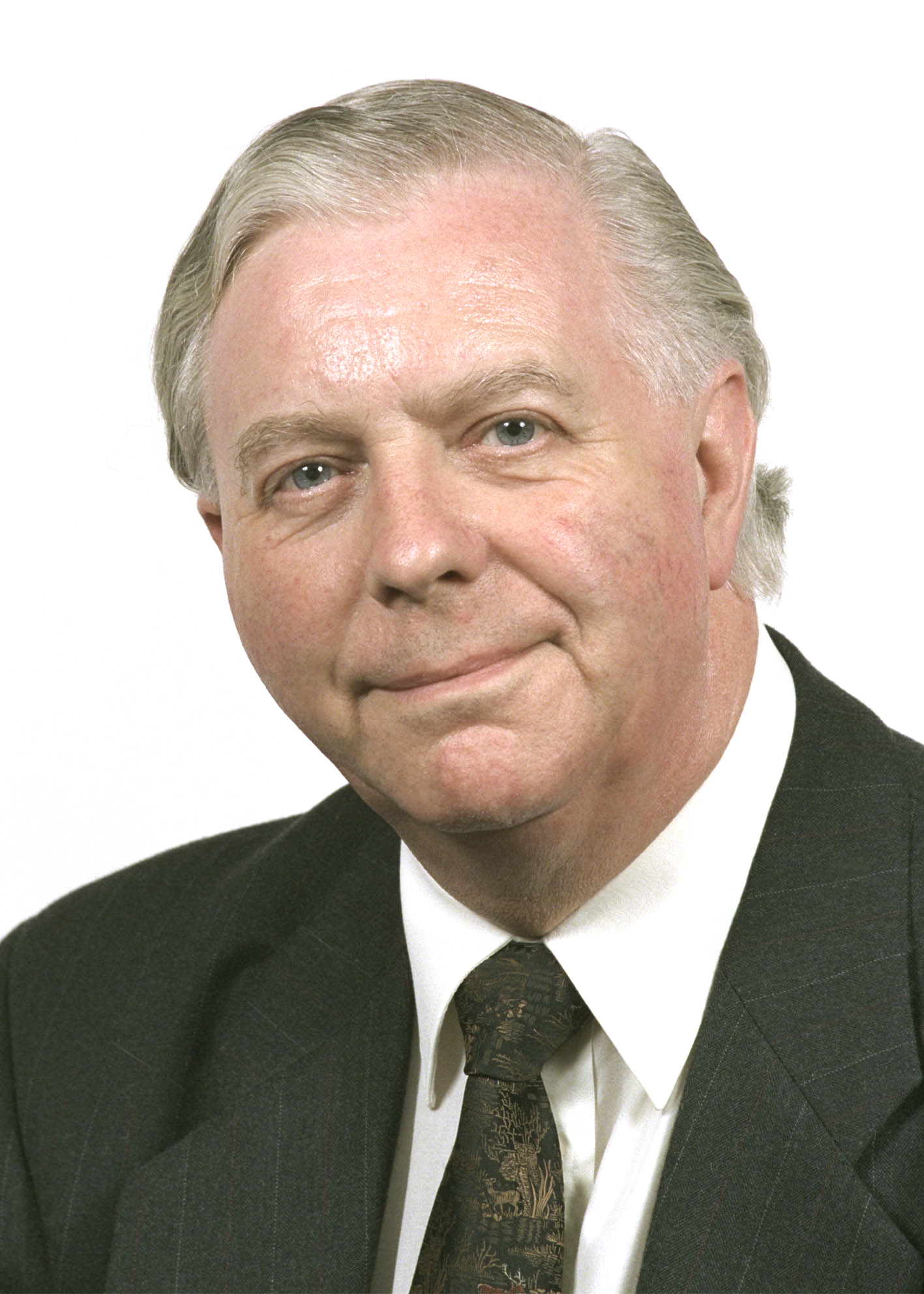
- Elliott in 1994

Member of the European Parliament for London West
- In office 14 June 1984 – 10 June 1999
- Preceded by: Brian Hord
- Succeeded by: Constituency dissolved

Personal details
- Born: 3 June 1932 (age 93)
- Party: Labour

Michael Norman Elliott (born 3 June 1932) was a Member of the European Parliament (MEP) for London West.

Elliott was educated at the Brunel College of Technology before becoming a research chemist. He also became active in the Labour Party, serving on Ealing Borough Council from 1964 until 1986. At the 1984 European Parliament election, he was elected to represent London West, serving until 1999.
