= Strongin =

Strongin is a surname. Notable people with the surname include:

- Laurie Strongin, American author and medical research campaigner
- Martha Strongin Katz, violist and member of the faculty of the New England Conservatory of Music
- Theodore Strongin (1918–1998), American music critic, composer, flautist, and entomologist
