= Jean Louvet =

Jean Louvet may refer to:

- Jean Louvet (politician), active in Provence in the early 15th century
- Jean-Baptiste Louvet de Couvray (1760–1797), French novelist, playwright, journalist, politician, and diplomat
- Jean Louvet (playwright) (1934–2015), Belgian playwright
