= New Square arson attack =

Attack in New York Hasidic community

- Location: New Square, New York, U.S.
- Date: May 22, 2011; 15 years ago
- Attack type: Assault, burning, arson
- Weapon: Blowtorch
- Injuries: 2 (including the perpetrator)
- Victim: Aron Rottenberg
- Perpetrator: Shaul Spitzer
- Motive: Retaliation for Rottenberg choosing not to pray in New Square's main synagogue
- Charges: First-degree assault; Attempted first-degree arson; Attempted second-degree murder (Note: The latter two charges were dropped in a plea deal.)
- Verdict: Pleaded guilty
- Convictions: First-degree assault
- Sentence: 7 years in prison (commuted after 3 1/2 years)

Aron Rottenberg, a resident of the Hasidic Jewish village of New Square, New York, was attacked with an incendiary device outside his home in the early morning of May 22, 2011, by eighteen-year-old Shaul Spitzer who intended to set the house afire because Rottenberg chose not to pray in New Square's main synagogue led by Skver Grand Rabbi David Twersky. Rottenberg suffered third-degree burns over 50 percent of his body and Spitzer suffered burns to his hands and arms. Twersky and other community leaders strongly condemned the use of violence.

Spitzer was indicted by a grand jury on June 23, 2011 on charges of first-degree attempted arson, first-degree assault, and second-degree attempted murder. On February 7, 2012 Spitzer entered a plea deal wherein he pleaded guilty to first-degree assault and was subsequently sentenced to seven years in prison. He was given youthful offender status by Judge William Kelly and released after serving 3 1/2 years in October 2015.

== Intimidation and violence prior to the attack ==
The May 22 arson attack came after many months of violence in New Square over the praying by some outside the grand synagogue. After Rottenberg, along with some friends, began worshiping outside the village at a residence for the elderly in September 2010, a rabbinical court ruled that praying outside the main synagogue was a serious violation of community rules. In September 2010, car windows were smashed in what is believed to be related to the dispute.

Prior to the May 22 arson attack, the Rottenbergs had filed several police reports concerning various acts and threats, including having their windows smashed and their daughter's school desk and books dumped on their front porch. According to Rottenberg's wife, they were warned that they should move out of New Square.

== The attack ==
Around 4 a.m. on May 22, 2011, Rottenberg's eldest son, Jacob, was monitoring the surveillance cameras the family had installed out of fear of attacks and harassment, when he saw what seemed to be at least one intruder placing gasoline-soaked rags in the backyard. Screaming, he awoke his father. Aron Rottenberg ran outside to confront the masked man, who turned out to be Spitzer, who was holding a self inject torch in his hands. Spitzer did not allow Rottenberg to remove his mask, and while Rottenberg was struggling with Spitzer, the torch was activated and it exploded, setting both afire. Rottenberg suffered third-degree burns over 50 percent of his body, Spitzer suffered burns to his hands and arms. Ramapo police said that Spitzer planned on burning down Rottenberg's house.

== Impact ==
=== Reactions ===
Initially, the deputy mayor of New Square, Israel Spitzer, the suspect's cousin, said the attack was simply a personal dispute between the two men. The town supervisor, Christopher St. Lawrence, said he trusted the deputy mayor. St. Lawrence had been re-elected in 2009 with the support of virtually all of New Square's 2,000 voters. Peter Brower, Ramapo's police chief, also said there was no evidence linking it to previous incidents.

Joe Meyers, a county legislator, called for a federal investigation and criticized St. Lawrence's response. He said there were indications of a concerted effort "to intimidate Mr. Rottenberg and to effectively deny him his legal right to worship where he pleases."

The Journal News called for a federal investigation into the incident, citing past police action, due to the alleged influence of the Skver congregation on local politicians.

Shortly after the attack, a note posted at the main synagogue condemned violence, saying "much effort was made to settle the matter amicably and peacefully, and there is no justification why private people should take such an action".

On May, 26 Twersky issued a statement in Yiddish to a group of yeshiva students, condemning violence. It reads as follows in the translation provided by FailedMessiah:

I want to announce something. We're going through a painful time. We should really not have to say this. We know from all the years, I spoke many times about this, not to use force or violence, and even more so, not to hurt any Jew. It's against our ways. Everyone knows the way of Skver is Torah, and all its ways are ways of pleasantness and all its paths are peace. I really should not have to say this. But because this terrible thing happened, maybe it's good to say it again and let everyone know that, God forbid, do not fight with force, it makes troubles. It's against our way, the way of Skver. This [incident] brought a lot of tears and pain. Whoever needs healing, God should send them healing, and they should come home healthy. Now is a time of healing. God should help that the shtetl [the village of New Square] should be at peace with one heart, with Torah and mitzvos and good deeds ...

=== Indictments and convictions ===
The FBI joined the investigation of the attack and the months of violence leading up to it.

18-year-old Spitzer was charged with attempted murder and attempted arson and was ordered held on $300,000 bail. According to residents of New Square, Spitzer is part of a network of up to 40 men and boys who defend the Grand Rabbi with intimidation and violence.

Spitzer was indicted by a grand jury on June 23, 2011. He was charged with first-degree attempted arson, first-degree assault, and second-degree attempted murder. He pleaded not guilty. On February 7, 2012, Spitzer entered a plea deal where he pleaded guilty to assault, which carries a sentence range of five to 25 years for a first-time offender. Supreme Court Justice William A. Kelly came down from his original 15-year cap after Rottenberg suggested leniency and the Rockland prosecutors offered 10 years.

During the hearing on April 17, 2012, Spitzer apologized for the attack and said he had meant to scare the family into moving out of the community. He was sentenced to seven years in prison.

Rottenberg filed a $36 million civil lawsuit against Twersky and Spitzer. He reached a settlement for about $2 million. The settlement brought assurances from the community's leaders that they will respect his religious rights to pray wherever he wants, allow him to sell his house and permit him to send his children to any school without interference.

On March 8, 2012, Rottenberg's car was torched. Aron Fromowitz is charged with felony counts of third-degree arson and second-degree criminal mischief, and could face a sentence of up to 15 years in prison. Fromowitz, who turned himself in, pleaded not guilty to the charges. He posted bail and was ordered to stay away from Rottenberg's home. Rottenberg reportedly said there was no connection to the May 22 arson attack and that Fromowitz was drunk celebrating Purim and took issue with his lecturing him on drinking.

On October 27, 2015, Spitzer was re-sentenced as youthful offender, and was released.
