= West London (disambiguation) =

West London generally refers to the western portions of London, and may refer specifically to:

- West London, an inexactly defined part of London
- West End of London
- West End (ward)
- W postcode area
- University of West London

== See also ==
- London West (disambiguation)
