= Soos =

Soos or SOOS may refer to:

== Surname ==
- Frank Soos, American short story writer
- Ricky Soos, English retired middle-distance runner
- Rozalia Șooș, Romanian former handballer

== Places ==
- Soos, Iran, a village in Qazvin Province, Iran
- Sooß, a town in Austria

== Fictional ==
- Soos Ramirez, a character in the animated series Gravity Falls
- Soos (king of Sparta), a fictitious king of Sparta

== Other uses ==
- SOOS, ICAO code for Saül Airport in French Guiana
- Southern Ocean Observing System (SOOS), an oceanographic initiative
- A matriclan of the Serer people. See Serer maternal clans ( Soos)

== See also ==
- Soós, a Hungarian surname
