= Monsey Trails =

Private bus company

Monsey Trail
- Headquarters: 8 Washington Avenue
- Locale: Spring Valley, New York
- Service area: Rockland County, New York, Lakewood, New Jersey
- Service type: coach service
- Routes: 6
- Fleet: 60-70 buses
- Fuel type: diesel
- Chief executive: Chaim Lunger
- Website: www.monseytrails.com

Monsey Trail is a private bus company plying a publicly licensed route based in Rockland County, New York. It is operated by the Jewish Lunger family of the Skver Hasidic sect in New Square. The publicly subsidized carrier uses a fleet of about 60 coach buses, a few of which are publicly owned by Rockland County and leased to Monsey, running about 75 scheduled daily commuter trips. While the county-owned Transport of Rockland provides local service and connects commuters with rail transit to New York City, Monsey Trails, along with Short Line, provides private bus service between the suburbanized region and the area's principal city, New York City. A subsidiary, Monsey Tours, provides charter service.

The company's primary area of service is in the heavily Haredi west-central portion of the county, and much of the company's literature is printed in both English and Yiddish. Routes originate in Monsey, a community with a strong Orthodox Jewish but somewhat diverse population, and New Square, a Hasidic village. Many routes also travel to the heavily Haredi Jewish Brooklyn neighborhoods of Williamsburg and Boro Park. Another route connects Monsey and New Square with Kiryas Joel, an exclusive Satmar Hasidic community in Orange County.

Monsey Trails made the news in 1994, when a Jewish woman filed a discrimination suit against the company, after she was told by Haredi Jewish passengers to leave a men’s section. The dispute raised questions about how far a company which receives government financing can go in accommodating religious practices. Monsey Trails received mass transit subsidies from New York State amounting to nearly $650,000 in 1993, roughly a quarter of the company's annual revenue. The suit resulted in an out-of-court settlement, in which Monsey Trails agreed not to actively segregate male and female riders for Jewish prayers, and neither to provide a curtain to separate the male passengers from women, nor advertise daily prayers in its timetables, as they had done before.

== Lakewood Express ==
Monsey Trails also operates service between Lakewood, New Jersey and Brooklyn under the Lakewood Express brand. This service was previously operated by Darkanu Bus Company until it shut down after an accident, and Monsey assumed the route.

== The Baltimore Line ==
Monsey Trails used to operate service between Pikesville, Maryland and Brooklyn under the Baltimore Line brand. A bus that departed once a week from 14th Ave & 53rd St in Brooklyn, and arrives at 7 Mile Market in Pikesville, Maryland. A bus also used to depart once a week from 7 Mile Market in Pikesville and returned to Brooklyn at 14th Ave & 53rd St. It has since been discounted due to low demand to the bus route.

== Routes ==
Route number	Route name	Route Description
1	NYC Route	New Square/Monsey to Manhattan
2	Brooklyn Route	New Square/Monsey to Williamsburg/Boro Park
5	Forshay Route	Monsey North to Manhattan
6	K.J. Express	New Square/Monsey to Kiryas Joel
7	Lakewood Express	Lakewood, New Jersey to Brooklyn
8	Baltimore Line	Brooklyn to Baltimore, Maryland
