= Daniel Reimold =

American journalist and professor

- Born: Daniel Ryan Reimold; January 25, 1981
- Died: August 20, 2015 (aged 34)
- Education: Ursinus College (BA); Temple University; Temple University (PhD)
- Occupation: Journalist

Daniel Ryan Reimold (January 25, 1981 – August 20, 2015) was an assistant professor of journalism at Saint Joseph's University in Philadelphia, Pennsylvania. There, he advised The Hawk, the student-run newspaper. He also wrote the college journalism blog College Media Matters.

== Career ==
Daniel Reimold earned his Bachelor of Arts degree in communication studies from Ursinus College in Collegeville, Pennsylvania, and his master's degree in journalism from Temple University in Philadelphia, Pennsylvania. He earned his Ph.D. in journalism and mass communication, and a certificate in contemporary history from Ohio University in Athens, Ohio. He had taught at the University of Tampa, in Tampa, Florida. Reimold was a visiting assistant professor of journalism in Nanyang Technological University in Singapore and maintained the student journalism industry blog 'College Media Matters', which is affiliated with the College Media Association.

== Death ==
Reimold's death was announced on August 21, 2015. Coroners reported that he suffered a seizure. He was 34 years old.

== Awards ==
- 2007 Graduate Associate Outstanding Teacher Award at Ohio University in Athens, Ohio
- 2004 First recipient of The Philadelphia Inquirer's Ralph Vigoda Memorial Award for passion in journalism

== Past works ==
Published articles in outlets such as

- Journalism History
- College Media Review
- The Philadelphia Inquirer
- Tampa Bay Times (formerly known as St. Petersburg Times)
- Poynter Online
- The Washington Post

Published articles in books including:

- Peck, Lee A., and Guy Reel. Media Ethics at Work: True Stories from Young Professionals. Thousand Oaks: CQ, 2013. Print.
- Kanigel, Rachele. The Student Newspaper Survival Guide. Ames, IA: Blackwell, 2006. Print

== Books ==
- Reimold, Daniel. Journalism of Ideas: Brainstorming, Developing, and Selling Stories in the Digital Age. New York, N. Y.: Routledge, 2013. Print.
- Reimold, Daniel. Sex and the University: Celebrity, Controversy, and a Student Journalism Revolution. New Brunswick, NJ: Rutgers UP, 2010. Print. According to WorldCat, the book is held in 888 libraries
