= Mates Friesel =

Mayor of New Square, New York
- In office 1961 – August 1, 2015
- Preceded by: Founding mayor
- Succeeded by: Israel Spitzer

Personal details
- Born: c. 1924; Poland
- Died: August 1, 2015 (age 91)

Mates Friesel (c. 1924 – August 1, 2015) was an American Skver Hasidic politician and businessman. Friesel was a co-founder and the first, and only, Mayor of New Square, New York, from the village's founding in 1961 until his death on August 1, 2015. He ran unopposed in each of New Square's mayoral elections since 1961, most recently winning re-election in November 2013 to a new two-year term. Friesel was one of the longest-serving Mayors in the United States.

== Biography ==
Friesel emigrated to the United States from Poland. He owned and operated a travel business.

Friesel was one of the founders of the village of New Square, New York, which was formed in 1961. During the mid-1950s, Skver Grand Rabbi Yakov Yosef Twersky dispatched a group of his followers from their home in Williamsburg, Brooklyn, to a newly acquired 130-acre dairy farm, located in Ramapo, New York, in Rockland County, New York. The group constructed a large synagogue, over the opposition by Ramapo town officials, and began building residential homes. New Square was established in 1961 as the first predominantly Hasidic town in the United States.

Mates Friesel was elected as New Square's first, founding Mayor in 1961. He was unopposed in each of his mayoral campaigns from 1961 to November 2013, when he won his final election. Under Friesel and Grand Rabbis Yaakov Yosef Twersky and David Twersky, the village acquired a former hospital along New York State Route 45, which was converted to village municipal offices and classrooms. The village had also been purchasing land in the Catskills to construct a poultry plant. Friesel met with U.S. President Jimmy Carter on his plane in the late 1970s.

Friesel served as New Square's only mayor until his death in 2015. He died in office on August 1, 2015, at the age of 91. Friesel was survived by his wife, children, grandchildren and great-grandchildren. He was buried in Skver cemetery in New Square within 24 hours of his death, in accordance with Jewish law.

New Square Deputy Mayor Israel Spitzer succeeded Friesel as the village's second mayor.
