= Asmund Ekern =

Norwegian biologist

Asmund Ekern (16 January 1930 – 9 August 2015) was a Norwegian biologist who specialized in livestock nutrition.

He was born in Biri and graduated from the Norwegian College of Agriculture in 1956. He was subsequently hired there and to continue his education, taking the licentiate degree in 1961 and the doctorate in 1973 as well as a master's degree at Cornell University in 1962. He worked at the Norwegian College of Agriculture as an associate professor from 1964, and was promoted to docent in 1970 and professor in 1973. He retired in 1999. In 1985 he was elected fellow of the Norwegian Academy of Science and Letters.
