= Robin Bilbie =

English cricketer

Personal information
- Full name: Anthony Robin Bilbie
- Born: 29 April 1942; Sherwood, Nottinghamshire, England
- Died: 29 August 2015 (aged 73); York, North Yorkshire, England
- Batting: Right-handed
- Role: Batter

Domestic team information
- Years: Team
- 1960–1963: Nottinghamshire

Career statistics
Competition	First-class
Matches	14
Runs scored	291
Batting average	11.19
100s/50s	–/–
Top score	39
Catches/stumpings	12/–
- Source: Cricinfo, 14 November 2011

Anthony Robin Bilbie (29 April 1942 – 29 August 2015) was an English cricketer. He was a right-handed batsman. He was born at Sherwood, Nottinghamshire.

Bilbie made his first-class debut for Nottinghamshire against Hampshire in the 1960 County Championship. He made thirteen further first-class appearances for the county, the last of which came against Oxford University in 1963. In his fourteen first-class matches, he scored a total of 291 runs at an average of 11.19, with a high score of 39.
