= Bob Parsons (Australian footballer) =

Australian rules footballer

Personal information
- Full name: Robert Edward Parsons
- Born: 19 December 1941
- Died: 13 August 2015 (aged 73); Footscray, Victoria
- Height: 180 cm (5 ft 11 in)
- Weight: 80 kg (176 lb)

Playing career^{1}
Years	Club	Games (Goals)
1963	Footscray	4 (0)
- ^{1} Playing statistics correct to the end of 1963.

Robert Edward Parsons (19 December 1941 – 13 August 2015 ) was an Australian rules footballer who played with Footscray in the Victorian Football League (VFL).
