= Samuil Lurie =

Russian writer and literary historian

Samuil Aronovich Lurie (Russian: Самуил Аронович Лурье; 12 May 1942 – 7 August 2015) was a Russian writer and literary historian. Many of his works were published under the pseudonym S Gedroitz (Russian: С. Гедройц).

== Biography ==
Samuil Aronovich Lurie was born in Sverdlovsk to a family of philologists from Saint Petersburg evacuated during World War II. His father, Aron Naumovich Lurie (1913-2003), was a bibliographer, literary historian, Doctor of Philological Science and World War II veteran.

Lurie graduated from Leningrad State University and worked briefly as a village school teacher (1964-1964), then for the National Pushkin Museum in Saint Petersburg (1965-1966). His first publications were in Zvezda (1964). He wrote a column in Zvezda magazine named "Lessons of Belles-Lettres" (Russian: Уроки Изящной Словесности).

In 1966, he became an editor of the magazine Neva. From 1988-2002 he was editor-in-chief of the prose section. From 2002-12 he worked as an editor of Polden XXI Century, a science fantasy almanac. He authored more than a thousand journal articles.

Lurie was the chairperson of the Russian Booker Prize jury (2012). He was awarded the Zvezda Prize (1993, 2003), the Neva Magazine Prize (2002), the Peter Vyazemsky Prize (1997), and the I.P. Belkin Prize (2011). He died in Palo Alto, California, United States on 7 August 2015, aged 73.

== Books ==
- Литератор Писарев: роман. Л.: Советский писатель, 1987; written 1969, original printing destroyed by security organs
- Толкование судьбы (эссе). СПб.: Борей, 1994
- Разговоры в пользу мёртвых (эссе). СПб.: Urbi, 1997
- Успехи ясновидения. СПб.: Издательство Пушкинского фонда, 2002
- Муравейник. СПб.: Издательство журнала Нева, 2002
- Нечто и взгляд. СПб.: Издательство Пушкинского фонда, 2004
- Письма полумёртвого человека (роман в письмах). СПб.: Янус, 2004 (together with Дм. Циликиным)
- Такой способ понимать. СПб.: Класс, 2007
- Сорок семь ночей. СПб.: Журнал «Звезда», 2008 (under pseudonym С. Гедройц)
- Гиппоцентавр, или Опыты чтения и письма. СПб: Читатель, 2011 (under pseudonym С. Гедройц)
- Железный бульвар. СПб.: Азбука, 2012
- Изломанный аршин. СПб.: Пушкинский фонд, 2012
- Меркуцио, Zvezda 2015
