= Heino Thielemann =

German field hockey player (1923–2015)

Heinrich "Heino" Thielemann (3 October 1923 – 24 August 2015) was a German field hockey player who competed in the 1952 Summer Olympics.
