= June Schwarcz =

American artist (1918–2015)

- Born: June Morris; June 10, 1918; Denver, Colorado
- Died: August 2, 2015 (aged 97); Sausalito, California
- Known for: Metalwork and enameler
- Spouse: Leroy Schwarcz (m. 1943)

June Schwarcz (née June Morris, June 10, 1918 in Denver – August 2, 2015) was an American enamel artist who created tactile, expressive objects by applying technical mastery of her medium to vessel forms and plaques, which she considers non-functional sculpture.

== Biography ==
Schwarcz was born on June 10, 1918 in Denver, Colorado. She studied industrial design at Pratt Institute in New York City from 1939 to 1941 and afterward created packages, greeting cards, textiles, and window displays in New York. In 1943 she married Leroy Schwarcz, an engineer whose work necessitated several moves. While visiting Denver en route to Sausalito in 1954, Schwarcz was introduced to enameling. She began creating enamels with pre-made metal forms but soon began pounding out her own, developing an expertise in the base-taille technique. When she moved to New Haven, Connecticut, in 1955, Schwarcz travelled to New York City to see examples of contemporary enamel. The curator of the Museum of Contemporary Crafts included her work in the museum's inaugural exhibition, Craftsmanship in a Changing World (1956), establishing her reputation.

When Schwarcz moved to La Jolla later that year, she showed with the Allied Craftsmen of San Diego and received her first solo exhibition at the La Jolla Art Center (1957). That same year she returned to Sausalito. Beginning in 1962, Schwarcz used electroplating and electroforming to create more dramatic textures and varied shapes. Her innovative use of copper foil and mesh, which she started using in 1964, enables her to fold, cut, gather, and stitch to create unique, dynamic forms.

Designated a Living Treasure of California in 1985, in 1987 she was named a fellow of the American Craft Council. Schwarcz also received the James Renwick Alliance Masters of the Medium Award (2009). Since the late 1950s her work has appeared in numerous exhibitions and has been the subject of solo shows at the San Francisco Museum of Craft and Folk Art (1998), the Mingel International Museum in San Diego (2009–10), and the Renwick Gallery of the Smithsonian American Art Museum Her work is in the permanent collection of the Cleveland Museum of Art, the Metal Museum, the Smithsonian American Art Museum, the Metropolitan Museum of Art, and the Museum of Arts and Design.

Schwarcz died on August 2, 2015 in Sausalito, California.
