= B. B. Lees =

American football coach (1931–2015)

Biographical details
- Born: March 23, 1931
- Died: August 24, 2015 (aged 84)

Coaching career (HC unless noted)
- 1964–1966: Eastern New Mexico

Head coaching record
- Overall: 9–18–1

Billy Lees (March 23, 1931 – August 24, 2015) was the seventh head football coach for Eastern New Mexico University in Portales, New Mexico and he held that position for three seasons, from 1964 until 1966. His overall coaching record at Eastern NMU was 9 wins, 18 losses, and 1 ties. This ranks him eighth at Eastern NMU in terms of total wins and tenth at Eastern NMU in terms of winning percentage.

Lees died on August 24, 2015.

== Head coaching record ==
Year	Team	Overall	Conference	Standing	Bowl/playoffs
Eastern New Mexico Greyhounds (NAIA independent) (1964–1966)
1964	Eastern New Mexico	4–5			
1965	Eastern New Mexico	3–6–1			
1966	Eastern New Mexico	2–7			
Eastern New Mexico:		9–18–1			
Total:		9–18–1			
