= Leo Antony Gleaton =

American photographer

Tony Gleaton
- Born: Leo Antony Gleaton; August 4, 1948; Detroit, Michigan, U.S.
- Died: August 14, 2015 (aged 67); Palo Alto, California, U.S.
- Education: East Los Angeles Junior College; University of California, Los Angeles; University of California, Berkeley; Art Center College of Design, Pasadena
- Known for: Photography
- Notable work: Africa's Legacy in Mexico (1990's)
- Spouse: Lisa Ellerbee

Leo Antony (Tony) Gleaton (August 4, 1948 – August 14, 2015) was an American photographer. Born in Detroit, Michigan, he moved with his family to California at the age of 11. He joined the Marines after high school, then pursued a college degree at the University of California Los Angeles, where he became interested in photography. A large portion of his work was about capturing images of African displacement in the West (the Americas) and its influence. He was also well known for his photography of black cowboys. Gleaton died in his home in Palo Alto, California, on August 14, 2015, after a long battle with oral cancer.

== Early life and education ==
Gleaton was born to a middle-class family. Gleaton's mother, Geraldine Woodson, a school teacher, and father, Leo, a police officer, split up when he was 11 years old. His mother then relocated his family to Los Angeles, California. He began his collegiate career at East Los Angeles Junior College where he played football. He left in 1967 to join the Marine Corps, serving one tour in Vietnam. In 1970 he returned to the U.S. and enrolled at the UCLA under the GI bill, but did not graduate. Gleaton also took classes at the University of California, Berkeley and the Art Center College of Design in Pasadena on scholarship. Gleaton earned an MFA in Fine Arts Photography from Bard College in 2002.

== Career ==
In 1977 Gleaton left California for New York City, where he began his career with an interest in fashion photography. In 1980 he left New York and the world of fashion photography. For the next few years he traveled around Texas and Mexico, where he did a handful of manual labor jobs, including working in construction and in oil fields. In that time he also began to photograph African Americans in those areas. From this point on Gleaton made a career out of photographing black cowboys, Native Americans, African Americans, and Mexican Americans. His focus was the multicultural South-West.

Gleaton was interested in the displaced, mainly Africans in the South-West. He specialized in black and white environmental portraits. Some are close-up portraits of individuals aware and unaware of the camera, some are group photos, and some landscapes of the areas that he photographed people in. The photos he captured of people were images of everyday life and not staged.

Gleaton's focus was race. He found that the greatest mix of culture was in South and Central America; therefore he spent most of his time and energy there. He did face some scrutiny because of his appearance. He had light skin and green eyes. He looked different than the subjects he photographed, so some of them were uncomfortable with him photographing them.

Gleaton traveled alone to the places he photographed, traveling lightly and mostly by bus. Typically he carried only his camera gear with him for the trip. After so many years of being around different cultural groups, Gleaton learned how to gain the trust of those he photographed. When he first began photographing people in the South-West and Central America, some felt uneasy about him photographing them, partly because of his appearance—including his height of 6’ 4", and his weight of over 300 pounds. He learned how to gain their trust, and make them comfortable enough to photograph them.

He is mostly known for his traveling exhibition of photographs with the Smithsonian called Africa’s Legacy in Mexico that began in the 1990s. This exhibit contained photos such as "Man & Canoe" and "My Father, My Son". Gleaton's exhibition catalogue contained a diary entry later entitled "Oaxaca Diary", in which he wrote in 1988 about a trip he took in Mexico to photograph. In the exhibition, Gleatons photos and diary entry accompanied articles about Africans in Mexico by Martinez Montiel, Miriam Jiménez Román, and Palmer.

== Late life ==
On August 14, 2015, at the age of 67, Gleaton died from oral cancer in his home in Palo Alto. He is survived by his fourth wife Lisa (née Ellerbee), a teacher, whom he married in 2005.
