= Francois Drummer =

South African cricketer (1938–2015)

Personal information
- Born: 30 September 1938; Cape Town, South Africa
- Died: 3 August 2015 (aged 76); Gauteng, South Africa
- Source: Cricinfo, 24 March 2016

Francois Drummer (30 September 1938 – 3 August 2015) was a South African cricketer. He played first-class cricket for Transvaal and Western Province.
