= A. B. M. Elias =

Bangladesh general, Military Secretary, and diplomat

Abu Bashar Mohammed Elias
- Born: 1 March 1944; Brahmanbaria, Bengal, British India
- Died: 1 August 2015 (aged 71); Dhaka, Bangladesh
- Military career
- Allegiance: Bangladesh; Pakistan (before 1971)
- Branch: Bangladesh Army; Pakistan Army
- Service years: 1965 – 1992
- Rank: Brigadier General
- Unit: Regiment of Artillery
- Commands: Military Secretary to President; Commander of 33rd Artillery Brigade

Abu Bashar Mohammed Elias (1944–2015) was a Bangladesh Army brigadier general and military secretary to the president of Bangladesh. He later served as a diplomat for the military attaché of Bangladesh to Turkey.

== Career ==
Elias with Chief Justice Abdul Munim and President Ershad in 1983.

Elias was commissioned on 21 November 1965 with the 35th batch of the Pakistan Military Academy. He was the founding commander of the 33rd Artillery Brigade, which is based in Comilla Cantonment. He served as the chair of a military tribunal following the military coup of General Hussain Mohammad Ershad.

From 21 June 1984 to 29 December 1988, Elias served as the military secretary to the president of Bangladesh, Hussain Mohammad Ershad. He then served as the military attaché in the Bangladesh Embassy in Turkey.

== Death ==
Elias died on 1 August 2015.
