= Alfred Burrows =

Indian cricketer (1952–2015)

Personal information
- Born: 1952; Madras, India
- Died: 16 August 2015 (aged 62–63); Perth, Australia
- Source: ESPNcricinfo, 24 March 2016

Alfred Burrows (1952 – 16 August 2015) was an Indian cricketer. He played twenty first-class matches for Railways between 1978 and 1986.
