= Joseph Kainrad =

American politician and judge

Member of the Ohio House of Representatives from the 35th district
- In office January 3, 1963 – December 31, 1968
- Preceded by: Districts Established
- Succeeded by: Anice Johnson

Personal details
- Born: May 29, 1933 Wayland, Ohio
- Died: August 5, 2015 (aged 82) Paris Township, Ohio
- Party: Democratic

Joseph R. Kainrad (May 29, 1933 – August 5, 2015) was an American politician and judge who served in the Ohio House of Representatives from Portage County, Ohio.
