= Alf Schwarz =

Canadian sociologist (1935–2015)

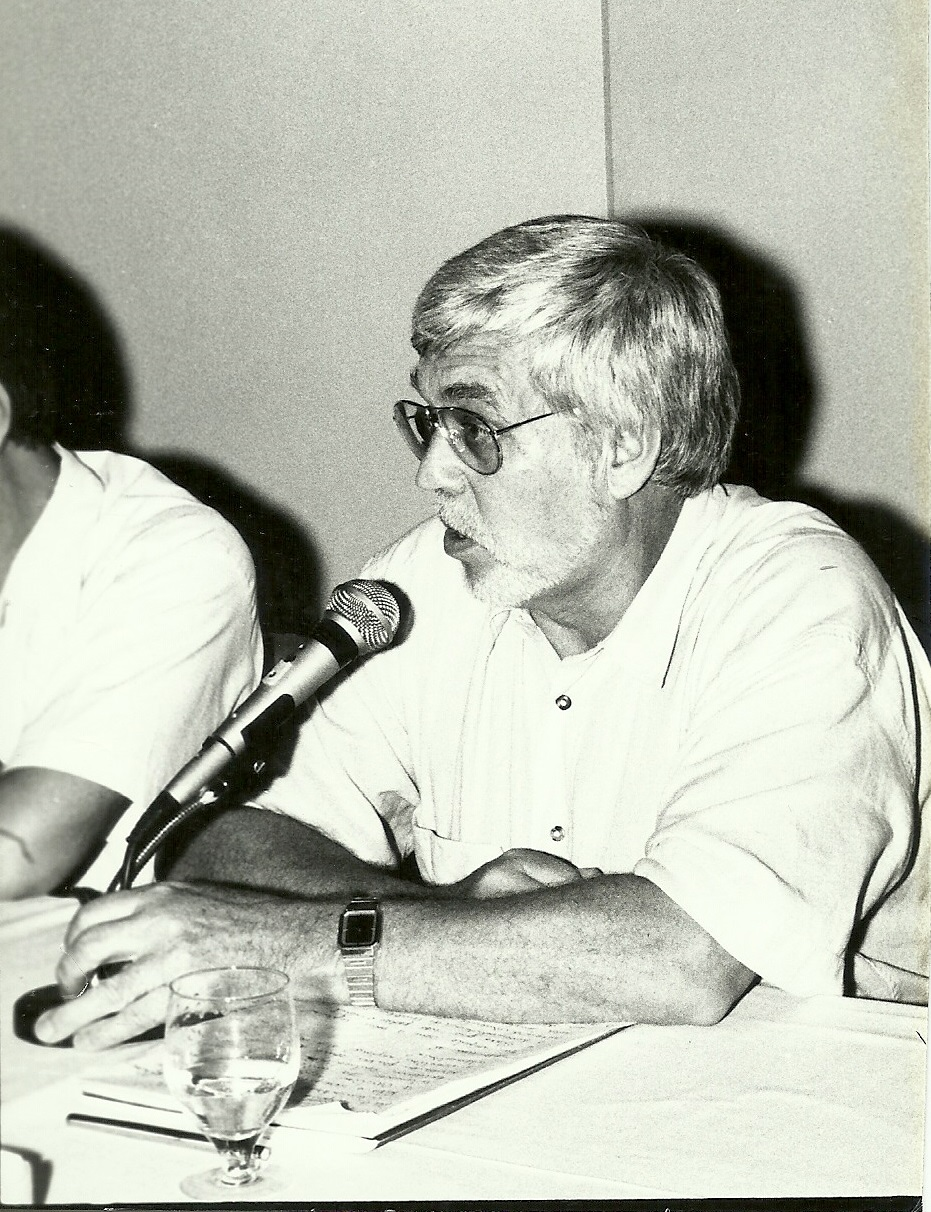
- Schwarz speaking at a conference in Brazil
- Born: 22 May 1935; Biberach an der Riss, Germany
- Died: 3 August 2015 (aged 80); Natal, Brazil
- Occupation: Canadian sociologist

Alf Schwarz (May 22, 1935 – August 3, 2015) was a Canadian sociologist noted for his research in Sub-Saharan Africa. After studies at the Sorbonne (Paris) with Raymond Aron, Pierre Bourdieu, Claude Lévi-Strauss, Roger Bastide, Georges Balandier and research assignment at Université de Dakar (Senegal), he began his academic career in 1963 with a faculty position at the Institut de recherches économiques et sociales of Université Lovanium. He joined in 1966 Université Laval (Quebec City) as professor of sociology. He founded at Laval University the first academic program in African studies in French speaking Canada. As one of the pioneers of African studies in Canada he was decidedly involved in the creation of the Canadian Association of African Studies and edited for many years the Canadian Journal of African Studies/La Revue Canadienne des Études Africaines. He retired from Laval University in 1998. He died in Natal, Brazil in 2015.

== Honours ==
Professor Schwarz has been awarded Doctor honoris causa by the Universidade Estadual do Rio Grande do Norte (UERN, Mossoró, Brazil), and received an honorary Fellowship of the Fundação José Augusto, Natal, Brazil.

== Books ==
- 1989, L'industrie de la sécheresse - le développement régional au Nordeste brésilien, CRAD, Université Laval, Québec, 385 p.
- 1989, Raison d'État / raison paysanne: essai sur le développement rural, Collection essais, Publications du Laboratoire de recherches sociologiques, Université Laval, 125 p.
- 1986, Masse et individualité, in Jacques Zylberberg (ed.), La sociologie des masses, Klincksieck Méridiens, Paris
- 1983, Les dupes de la modernisation, Editions Nouvelle Optique, Montréal, 298 p.
- 1982, Le tiers-monde et sa modernité de seconde main, FJA, Natal, 354 p.
- 1980, Le développement inégal au Zaïre: approche psycho-sociologique, in V.Y. Mudimbe (ed.), La dépendance de l'Afrique et les moyens d'y remédier, Berger-Levrault, Paris
- 1979, Colonialistes, africanistes et Africains, Editions Nouvelle Optique, Montréal 120 p.
- 1979, Les faux prophètes de l'Afrique ou l´afr (eu)canisme, Les Presses de l'Université Laval, Quebec, 244 p.
- 1975, Autopsie d'une aliénation: la jeunesse amérindienne du Nord canadien, in Elia Zureik et Robert M. Pike (eds.), Sozialization and Values in Canadien Society, Mc. Clelland and Stewart, Toronto, 1975, pp. 239-261
