= Lenny B. Robinson =

American charity worker (1963–2015)

- Born: Leonard B. Robinson; September 28, 1963; Baltimore, Maryland
- Died: August 16, 2015 (aged 51); Big Pool, Maryland
- Other names: Baltimore Batman; Route 29 Batman; LBR

Leonard B. Robinson (September 28, 1963 – August 16, 2015) was an American charity worker who became known as the Baltimore Batman after dressing up as Batman and visiting children in Baltimore, Maryland-area hospitals. He gained fame in 2012 when a video of him being pulled over for an issue with a license plate went viral. On August 16, 2015, he was killed along Interstate 70 when his parked vehicle was struck by another motorist. Support for Robinson's philanthropy has come from former Super Bowl MVP Ray Lewis, musician John Mayer, and the official Batman Facebook page. Robinson was an avid Baltimore Ravens fan, and attended both of the Ravens' Super Bowls during the 2000 and 2012 seasons. He befriended some of the Ravens' players and staff members as he often attended their charitable functions, especially if they were for children.

== Philanthropy ==
Robinson's mission was "to entertain ill and terminally ill children by appearing to them as Batman and teaching them that just as Batman fights battles, no matter how hard or long their health battles may be, with strength of will and determination, there is always hope!" He started volunteering in 2001. In 2007, Robinson sold his cleaning business and retired to devote to visiting sick children full time. He visited sick children in hospitals, handing out Batman memorabilia to them, and was sure to sign every book, hat, T-shirt, and backpack he handed out as "Batman". Some of the hospitals he visited included the Children's National Medical Center, Sinai Hospital, and Georgetown University Hospital. In 2016, Laurie Strongin and her non-profit, Hope for Henry Foundation, started the Lenny "Batman" Robinson Hope for Henry program at Sinai Hospital in Baltimore.

== Death ==
On August 16, 2015, Robinson was returning from a weekend festival in South Charleston, West Virginia, when his Batmobile broke down on Interstate 70 near the community of Big Pool, Maryland. As he was checking the engine, the driver of a Toyota Camry sideswiped and struck his custom Batmobile. The Batmobile struck Robinson in the abdomen, knocking him over. He died at the scene.

Baltimore Ravens two-time Super Bowl champion Ray Lewis paid respect to Robinson on his Twitter feed: "The world lost a special spirit. A true living angel. Lenny Robinson will always remain in my heart #baltimorebatman."

Robinson's funeral at Har Sinai Congregation in Owings Mills, Maryland, on August 19, 2015, was attended by hundreds. At the burial site, a black cover with the Dark Knight insignia was placed over Robinson's casket where he was laid to rest.
