= Nasser Pourpirar =

Iranian writer (died 2015)

- Persian: ناصر پورپیرار
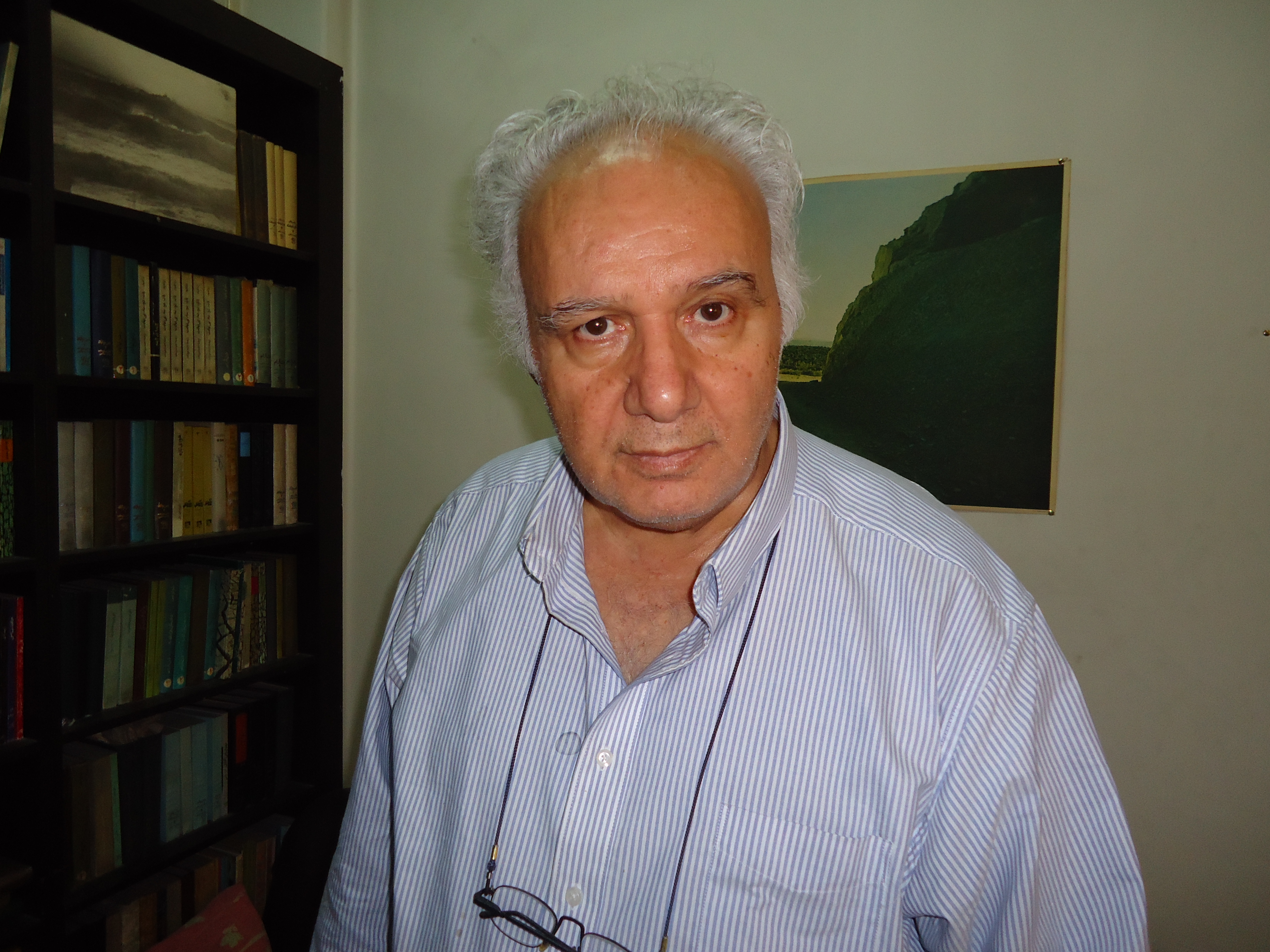
- Nasser Pourpirar
- Born: Nasser Banakonandeh (ناصر بناکننده); 1940 or 1941; Tehran, Imperial State of Iran
- Died: 27 August 2015 (aged 75); Tehran, Iran
- Writing career
- Pen name: Naria (ناریا)
- Genre: History

Nasser Pourpirar (Persian: ناصر پورپیرار; born Nasser Banakonandeh; ناصر بناکننده; pen name: Naria; ناریا; 1940 or 1941 – 27 August 2015) was an Iranian writer and historical revisionist. He was known for his controversial theories questioning the academically recognized historiography of Iran from Achaemenids to the beginning of the Safavid period.

== Early life ==
Pourpirar was born in 1940 or 1941 in Tehran, Iran. Pourpirar was closely involved with the Tudeh Party of Iran, a major Iranian political party with Communist or left tendencies. After the 1979 Revolution and after he embezzled the party's money then he joined the revolutionaries. On August 27, 2015 he died of Parkinson's disease at the age of 75.

== Pourpirar's claims ==
Pouripirar claimed that Purim (recorded in the Biblical Book of Esther) was a genocide against indigenous civilised Iranians committed by the Achaemenid Shah Darius I and his Jewish allies. He claims that "after the great genocide committed by Jews in Purim, the land of Iran was completely wiped out of human beings until the beginning of Islam."

He considered the Behistun Inscription as a symbol of this genocide. He claimed that construction of Persepolis was never finished and that the Achaemenid dynasty was a group of ancient barbarian Slavic invaders that ended with Darius the Great after they returned to their homeland in the Eurasian steppes. The rest of the Achaemenid, Parthian, Sassanid, Tahirid, Ghaznavid, Seljuqid and Samanid dynasties according to Pourpirar were fabricated by historians of mostly Jewish background as part of a Jewish conspiracy.

According to Pourpirar a few historic sites that are said to be Parthian are either clearly related to Greeks or are modern forgeries. He claimed that all inscriptions said to be Sassanid are modern forgeries. He claimed that historical personalities such as Mazdak, Mani, Zoroaster, Babak, Abu Muslim, and Salman the Persian were invented by modern Jewish historians.

Regarding the reliability of Iranian dynasties he wrote: "So everyone should know that the builders of the false historical and social lies of the last two thousand years between Purim till the Safavids were the Jews. They wanted to hide their genocide and thus used lies by fabricating history."

== Bibliography ==
A list of books written by Pourpirar expounding his view may be found in Karang Books, which is the publishing house he owns.

- The people will be victorious
- A thousand events will happen
- Foetus
- Colors Harmony, (eight volumes) with Feryal Dehdashti Shahrokh.
- Perhaps these five days
- Deliberation on structure of the Iranian history
  - Twelve centuries of Silence: Achaemenids
  - Twelve centuries of Silence: Parthians
  - Twelve centuries of Silence: Sassanids Part I
  - Twelve centuries of Silence: Sassanids Part II
  - Twelve centuries of Silence: Sassanids Part III
  - A bridge to the past: Part I
  - A bridge to the past: Part II
  - A bridge to the past: Part III
- Address to the third congress of Tudeh party of Iran (seven volumes)

== Responses ==
The following books responded to Pourpirar's claims:

- The glorious Millenaries (Persian: هزاره‌های پرشکوه, romanized: Hezarehaye Por Shokooh), by Dariush Ahmadi.
- Twelve centuries of splendor (Persian: دوازده قرن شکوه), by Amir Limayi and Dariush Ahmadi
- Cyrus and Babylon (Persian: کورش و بابِل), by Houshang Sadeghi
- The Veracity of ancient Persian and Arya (Persian: اعتبار باستان‌شناختی آریا و پارس, by Mohammad Taqi 'Ataii and Ali Akbar Vahdati.

=== Opponents responses ===
- Azargoshnasb, Response to Anti-Iranians
