= Joy Golden =

American advertising executive (1930–2015)

Joy Golden (June 13, 1930 – August 29, 2015; born Joy Rena Man) was an advertising executive. She was well known for creating the radio spots for The Laughing Cow cheese. She was among the first generation of women in advertising.

Golden was born in Manhattan and raised in Forest Hills, Queens, New York. In 1952, she graduated at the University of Connecticut with an English degree; that same year, she married Stanley L. Golden who was a tax lawyer.

Golden died at age 85 in Manhattan on August 29, 2015. Her cause of death was complications from pneumonia.
