= Pietro Armando Lavini =

San Leonardo al Volubrio
- Location within Italy

General information
- Location: Montefortino, Marche, Italy
- Coordinates: 42.921940°N 13.275888°E
- Elevation: 1,125 m (3,691 ft)

Pietro Armando Lavini (7 July 1927 – 9 August 2015) was a Catholic Capuchin friar who spent almost his entire life rebuilding, single-handedly, the ruined church of Saint Leonard at Volubrio in a remote mountainous region within the Monti Sibillini National Park, Marche, Italy. The church lies just to the north west of the "Gorges of Hell", a popular natural attraction.

== Life ==
Armando Girio Lavini was born in Potenza Picena. Although the exact birthdate is unknown, it is commonly reported as July 7, 1927.

At the age of nine, Armando joined the Capuchin friars, with whom he journeyed for the first time into the mountains. Armando chose the ruins of Saint Leonard as a beautiful natural environment, and from 1971 till his death he rebuilt the church there whilst living as a hermit.

Lavini became well known from articles published by writer Andreas Englisch. Pietro himself wrote a book published in 1999 about his life. Pietro died on August 9, 2015, at the age of 88.

== Church building ==
The church was built on the ruins of a II-III century chapel. (Re)construction began on May 24, 1971. Lavini spent four years alone on the piping of water to the site from the nearest stream. The church was finally consecrated some 30 years later, on September 17, 2000, by Gennaro Franceschetti, archbishop for the diocese of Fermo. The bell tower was completed in 2012. On June 8, 2014, the church received an organ from an internationally known musical instrument manufacturing company.
