= Ludwig Ott (water polo) =

German water polo player (1937–2015)

Personal information
- Nationality: German
- Born: 8 March 1937; Stuttgart, Germany
- Died: 7 August 2015 (aged 78)

Sport
- Sport: Water polo

Ludwig Ott (8 March 1937 – 7 August 2015) was a German water polo player. He competed in the men's tournament at the 1968 Summer Olympics.
