= Edward Thomas (police officer) =

American police officer

Edward Alfred Thomas (September 23, 1919 – August 10, 2015) was one of the first African Americans to work as a police officer for the Houston Police Department.

He was born on September 23, 1919, in Keatchi, Louisiana, to Edward and Dora Thomas, a landowner and teacher, respectively. He attended Southern University in Baton Rouge, but his education was interrupted when he was drafted. He served in the Invasion of Normandy and the Battle of the Bulge.

Thomas joined the Houston Police Department in 1948, initially experiencing substantial discrimination as the sole African-American on the force. At first he was not permitted to attend roll call in the squad room, nor to use the cafeteria, and was not issued a squad car; he was employed to police the Black community and only allowed to arrest non-white suspects. He slowly gained his colleagues' respect by "doing his job unimpeachably" and rose to senior police officer. Thomas served for 63 years, the longest period of service of any municipal employee. He retired in 2011, when he was in his nineties.

He was married to Helen A. Thomas; the couple had a son and daughter. They later divorced.

In July 2015 Houston Police Headquarters was renamed the Edward A. Thomas Building.
