= The Hawk (newspaper) =

Student newspaper of Saint Joseph's University in Philadelphia, Pennsylvania

- Type: Weekly student newspaper
- Format: Broadsheet
- Owner: Saint Joseph's University
- Publisher: Engle Printing
- Founded: 1929; 96 years ago
- Headquarters: Simpson Hall; Saint Joseph's University; 5600 City Avenue; Philadelphia, Pennsylvania 19131
- Circulation: 1,500 weekly
- Price: Free for students
- Website: sjuhawknews.com

The Hawk is the weekly student newspaper of Saint Joseph's University located in Philadelphia, Pennsylvania, and is published every Wednesday during the school year. It appears in print and online and includes News, Opinions, Lifestyle, and Sports sections. Exclusive multimedia content can also be found online.

The paper is distributed on campus on Wednesdays during the academic year at major campus locations including the Post Learning Commons, Campion Student Center, academic buildings, and student residence halls. While The Hawk strives to bring objective news to the student body, it does not serve as a public relations platform for Saint Joseph's University.

The Hawk contains news articles about Saint Joseph’s University, while the Opinions section highlights the views of different individuals and groups on campus through columns, staff editorials and letters to the editor. The Lifestyle section includes soft news, human interest stories about people and events on campus and in the area, and student columns about campus life and popular culture. The Sports section focuses on the Saint Joseph’s University Hawks and Philadelphia-area professional teams.

== Distribution ==
The newspaper is free to those affiliated with the university and is distributed every Wednesday during the academic year. It has a print circulation of 2500.

== Awards ==
The National Pacemaker Awards are the highest achievement for college journalism. The awards are given every fall at the Associated Collegiate Press (ACP) conference. The Hawk won two Pacemakers in 2014. The first award was for excellence in student media in the category of “Four-year Non-daily Newspaper.” Staff member, Weiyi (Dawn) Cai, ’15, won fifth place for Designer of the Year Award for infographics.
