= Ibtihal Salem =

Egyptian writer (1949–2015)

Ibtihal Salem (1949 – 15 August 2015) was an Egyptian short story writer, novelist and translator. She was born in Giza and studied psychology at Ain Shams University. She has worked in Egyptian theatre and radio. Her first collection of short stories, al-Nawras (The Seagull) was published in 1989, followed by a second volume Dunya Saghira (Small World) in 1992. Her first novel Nawafiz Zarqaa (Blue Windows, 2000) was well received by critics. She has published several more short story collections and novels. Salem is considered to be part of the same generation of women writers as Sahar Tawfiq, Siham Bayyumi and Salwa Bakr.

A selection of her stories has been translated into English by Marilyn Booth under the title Children of the Waters. Her work has also been translated into German (by Hartmut Fahndrich), French and Italian.
