= London West (European Parliament constituency) =

Former European Parliament constituency

- European Parliament constituency
- Boundary within London (1979-1984)
- Member state: United Kingdom
- Created: 1979
- Dissolved: 1999
- MEPs: 1

Prior to its uniform adoption of proportional representation in 1999, the United Kingdom used first-past-the-post for the European elections in England, Scotland and Wales. The European Parliament constituencies used under that system were smaller than the later regional constituencies and only had one Member of the European Parliament each.

The constituency of London West was one of them.

When it was created in England in 1979, it consisted of the Westminster Parliament constituencies of Acton, Brentford and Isleworth, Ealing North, Feltham and Heston, Hayes and Harlington, Ruislip-Northwood, Southall and Uxbridge.

United Kingdom Parliamentary constituencies were redrawn in 1983 and the European constituencies were altered in 1984 to reflect this. The revised seat comprised the following Westminster constituencies: Brentford and Isleworth, Ealing Acton, Ealing North, Ealing Southall, Feltham and Heston, Hammersmith, Richmond and Barnes and Twickenham. The same boundaries were used in 1989 and 1994.

Boundary within South East England and London (1984-1994)

Boundary within South East England and London (1994-1999)

Returned members
1979	Brian Hord; Conservative
1984	Michael Elliott; Labour
1989	Michael Elliott; Labour
1994	Michael Elliott; Labour
1999	Constituency abolished: see London

== Election results ==
European Parliament election, 1979: London West
Party	Candidate	Votes	%	±%
Conservative	Brian Hord	89,433	51.0	N/A
Labour	James Daly	67,193	38.3	N/A
Liberal	R. M. Cohen	17,077	9.7	N/A
International Marxist	Tariq Ali	1,635	0.9	N/A
Majority		22,240	12.7	N/A
Turnout		175,338	33.0	N/A
Conservative win (new seat)				

European Parliament election, 1984: London West
Party	Candidate	Votes	%	±%
Labour	Michael Elliott	79,554	40.8	▲2.5
Conservative	Brian Hord	74,325	38.1	▼12.9
SDP	Christopher W. Layton	36,687	18.8	▲9.1
Ecology	Mrs. Deborah M. Sutherland	4,361	2.2	N/A
Majority		5,229	2.7	▼10.0
Turnout		194,927	37.7	▲4.7
Labour gain from Conservative		Swing	▲7.7	

European Parliament election, 1989: London West
Party	Candidate	Votes	%	±%
Labour	Michael Elliott	92,959	43.0	▲2.2
Conservative	Brendan Donnelly	78,151	36.2	▼1.9
Green	Jeremy R. Hywel-Davies	32,686	15.1	▲12.9
SLD	John Gordon Parry	9,309	4.3	▼14.5
SDP	J. R. Rogers-Davies	2,877	1.3	N/A
Majority		14,808	6.9	▲4.2
Turnout		215,982	41.9	▲4.2
Labour hold		Swing	▲2.1	

European Parliament election, 1994: London West
Party	Candidate	Votes	%	±%
Labour	Michael Elliott	94,562	51.9	▲8.9
Conservative	J. R. C. (Robert) Guy	52,287	28.7	▼7.5
Liberal Democrats	W. D. E. (Bill) Mallinson	21,561	11.8	▼7.5
Green	John W. Bradley	6,134	3.4	▼11.8
UKIP	Gerald Roberts	4,583	2.5	N/A
National Front	William A. Binding	1,963	1.1	N/A
Natural Law	Richard P. Johnson	1,105	0.6	N/A
Majority		42,275	23.2	▲16.3
Turnout		182,195	36.0	▼5.9
Labour hold		Swing	▲8.2	
