= Kim Nelson =

Australian artist

- Born: 7 March 1958; Kiama, New South Wales, Australia
- Died: 12 August 2015 (aged 57)
- Spouse: Therese van Leeuwen

Kim Nelson (7 March 1958 – 12 August 2015) was an Australian artist. He lived and worked in the foothills of the Brindabella mountain range, near the Australian National Capital, Canberra. Themes such as the recurring 'Red Shawl' and other spiritually suggestive motifs put his artwork firmly in the field of Symbolism though his style does range from classical to the abstract.

== Early years ==
Born in Kiama, Nelson grew up in a farming community on the New South Wales south coast. His artistic abilities were evident very early in his childhood, both in art and music. In 1976, on the suggestion of his uncle, Australian landscape artist Leonard Long, Nelson spent a year at the renowned Julian Ashton Art School in Sydney, studying life drawing. He subsequently embarked on a career in graphic design and advertising concurrent with a career as a singer/songwriter in contemporary music. He was to spend the greater part of a decade in this field.

This was followed by 10 years as manager/curator of historic house museums primarily for the National Trust of Australia (Cooma Cottage). In 1995 he was acting senior curator of Lanyon & Calthorpes' House in Canberra.

== Fine art (1996–2015) ==
In 1996 Nelson retired from curatorial work to embark on a full-time career in fine art. He has staged many solo exhibitions and completed commissioned art for a diverse range of organizations and individuals from National Trust of Australia, Pan MacMillan Publishing, ACT Supreme Court through to international media magnate Rupert Murdoch. Upon opening Nelson's first Sydney exhibition, art investor and financial guru, the late Rene Rivkin stated in his address "I like it, I think you should buy it!"

In 2004, Nelson embarked on an artistic pilgrimage to visit the home of German Renaissance artist, Albrecht Dürer and to attend a major retrospective of the late Italian artist Massimo Rao staged at the Panorama Museum in Bad Frankenhausen, Germany. This trip to Europe inspired and informed three separate solo exhibitions in 2005 – 'Postcards', 'Icon' and 'Beyond These Shores', the last of which was officially opened by the Lord Mayor of Sydney, Clover Moore MP.

Since 2006, Nelson has been represented by United Galleries in both Sydney and Perth. In 2008, United Editions published 'NELSON – The Art of Kim Nelson' being the first published survey of Nelson's output over the period from 1996 to 2008 and included text by gallery director Robert Buratti and author Brian Caswell.

== Charity ==
In 1994 Nelson gifted a major artwork 'Desert Storm' to UNICEF Australia for auction which began a period of association with this international humanitarian organization. He also created an edition print entitled 'The Gift' as another form of fundraising for UNICEF. Nelson has gifted art and design to many major and minor organisations and charities such as UNICEF, Hope for the Children (Rotary International), AMACC (Afghan Mother & Child Care), Koomarri Canberra, The Smith Family, NSW Volunteer Bushfire Brigade, Can Assist.

In 2013 Nelson was named Yass Valley Shire 'Citizen of the Year' in the Australia Day honours for his work in the community and specifically for the YASSarts initiative.

== Personal life ==
Before his death on 12 August 2015 following a heart attack, Nelson was married with one daughter and lived near Yass, New South Wales with his wife Therese van Leeuwen. Nelson was blind in his right eye, the result of a congenital cataract at birth.

== Representation ==
- Buratti Fine Art, Perth
- Kim Nelson Fine Art, NSW
