= Frankie Rivera =

Native American activist (1977–2015)

Franklyn Francisco Rivera
- Born: June 18, 1977
- Died: August 29, 2015 (aged 38)
- Known for: Native American and civil rights activism

Frankie Rivera (June 18, 1977 – August 29, 2015) was a Navajo and Taino (Puerto Rican) Native American activist.

== Activism ==
He was an activist for the American Indian Movement West. He demanded freedom for Leonard Peltier and justice for Alex Nieto who he believed to have been murdered by San Francisco Police Department officers, and an end to discriminatory practices by local businesses. He marched in support of civil rights, Idle No More, Little Children are Sacred and other causes.

== Prison ==
He served a 10-year prison sentence where he became acquainted with his Native American roots.

== Early life ==
His parents were Father, Frankie Rivera his biological mother Laurene Killip. He grew up in the San Francisco Mission District. He had (3) Brother and (4) Sisters.

== Death ==
Rivera died on August 29, 2015, from brain cancer and other internal illnesses. Where he was not taken care of in a Hospice home in Sacramento, CA, Father's family that consist of his sister who lives on an Indian Reservation in Arizona along with his brothers in law and other sister from San Francisco, Grandmother, Tia, and Father whom removed him from the hospice and taken him to a hospital in Sacramento whom refused to accept him and treat him. He had been starving and needed fluids and nutrition. His family then took him to the hospital in his home town, San Francisco, CA. The hospital took great care of Frankie, he was looking healthy after just a few days, getting all his nutrition, however by the time the cancer and other illness caught up to him, Frankie only lived a few days after. God gave us Frankie for a few more days, although he said to us that he was not ready to die and wanted to stay alive, Frankie began to realize that God was calling him home. Frankie passes away in the hospital and loved ones coordinated with each other to give him a nice funeral that consist of a service, church and Native American burial.
