= Keith K. Hilbig =

Second Quorum of the Seventy
- March 31, 2001 – April 1, 2006
- Called by: Gordon B. Hinckley
- End reason: Transferred to First Quorum of the Seventy

First Quorum of the Seventy
- April 1, 2006 – October 6, 2012
- Called by: Gordon B. Hinckley
- End reason: Designated an emeritus general authority

Emeritus General Authority
- October 6, 2012 – August 22, 2015
- Called by: Thomas S. Monson

Personal details
- Born: Keith Karlton Hilbig; March 12, 1942; Milwaukee, Wisconsin, U.S.
- Died: August 22, 2015 (aged 73); Salt Lake City, Utah, U.S.

Keith Karlton Hilbig (March 12, 1942 – August 22, 2015) was a general authority of the Church of Jesus Christ of Latter-day Saints (LDS Church) from 2001 until his death. Prior to becoming a general authority, he was general counsel for the LDS Church in Europe.

Hilbig was born in Milwaukee, Wisconsin. His father, Karl Herbert Hilbig, was from Zwickau, Germany who joined the LDS Church before immigrating to the United States. As a young man, Hilbig served as a missionary in the LDS Church's Central German Mission.

Hilbig earned a bachelor's degree in European history from Princeton University, where his Senior Thesis was titled "Constitutional Reform in the Holy Roman Empire 1495-1505: Prelude, Protagonists, Program." He later studied at Duke University School of Law, and also attended Brigham Young University for a semester after his mission. Hilbig worked for a large law firm in the Los Angeles, California area and later had his own law practice.

== LDS Church service ==
In the LDS Church, Hilbig served as a bishop, stake president, and regional representative. From 1989 to 1992, he was president of the church's Switzerland Zürich Mission. From 1995 to 2001, Hilbig was an area seventy. In April 2001, he became a general authority and a member of the Second Quorum of the Seventy. He was transferred to the First Quorum of the Seventy in April 2006. As a general authority, he served in several area presidencies and as executive director of the church's Audiovisual Department.

During the church's October 2012 general conference, Hilbig was released from the Seventy and designated an emeritus general authority. After suffering from Alzheimer's disease for several years, Hilbig died on August 22, 2015, at the age of 73.

== Personal life ==
Hilbig married Susan Rae Logie in the Salt Lake Temple in 1967 and they are the parents of six children.

== See also ==
- "Elder Keith K. Hilbig Of the Seventy," Liahona, July 2001
- Deseret Morning News 2008 Church Almanac (Salt Lake City, Utah: Deseret Morning News, 2007) p. 46
- "Elder Keith K. Hilbig", Church News, 6 October 2011, retrieved 7 May 2014.
