= Wang Jiexi =

Chinese actress

- Born: 12 December 1989; Changsha, Hunan, China
- Died: 9 August 2015 (aged 25); China
- Occupation: Actor
- Years active: 2008–2015

Wang Jiexi (Chinese: 王洁曦; pinyin: Wáng Jiéxī; 12 December 1989 – 9 August 2015) was a Chinese actor of cinema and television. She was a graduate of the Beijing Film Academy's Performance Department and began her professional acting career in 2008 until her death from leukaemia at age 25 in 2015.

== Biography ==
On 12 December 1989, Wang was born in Changsha, which a city located in the Hunan Province. She was of Han descent. Wang did hosting during her childhood years but did not do this when she was older. Following her graduation from high school, Wang went on to graduate from the Beijing Film Academy's Performance Department. Wang began her acting career in the 2008 Hunan Television urban comedy Ugly Invincible, in which she portrayed the role of Dong Yingying, the girlfriend of Fei Denan. The performance earned her the 2008 Asian Star Competition Dance Gold Award and ten more Chinese accolades. During the following year, Wang played the third daughter Long Jiajia in the 2009 Wei Jian-directed family drama I Love Long Jia Le. She was also a presenter on an entertainment channel and was Lili in A Family Rushing Forward.

In 2011, she played a female Normal University student in the film Beginning of the Great Revival. In the following year, Wang was featured in the youth life and youth inspiration themed film Sentimental Chronicles. She was the companion character in the 2013 night-time themed film Mummy, and was featured as the antagonist in the thriller Dead Sign, which was shortlisted at the 37th Montreal International Film Festival, also held in 2013. Over the course of 2014, Wang portrayed Teng Ji in The Virtuous Queen of Han, and was in the role of Zheng Luoyun, the fiancee of Gao Changgong, in the ancient drama television programme Princess of Lanling King. Wang took a hiatus from the show business industry as a consequence of her recuperating from health issues in January 2015. She played the part of Guo Xiaomei in Fighting Youth, which was released after death in 2015.

== Personal life ==
At 11 pm on the evening of 9 August 2015, she died of leukaemia at the age of 25.

== Style ==
Wang received media coverage during her acting career in China, and she had roles ranging from "a rebellious beautiful girl to an innocent college student", which enabled her to "follow the route of youth fashion, whether it is the poetry in the previous movie "Mummy" or Wang Zhi in the horror film "The Old Town." Sohu wrote that the actor "uses more authentic acting skills to create a female character with a beautiful appearance and a complicated heart" but said the release of the two dramas she featured was in during 2014 had "gradually revealed Wang Jiexi's beautiful costume appearance and more restrained and solid performance skills."
