= Pierfranco Pastore =

Pierfranco Pastore (21 April 1927 – 30 August 2015) was a Roman Catholic bishop. He was born in Varallo Sesia.

Ordained to the priesthood in 1950, Pastore was appointed secretary of the Pontifical Council for Social Communications in 1984. In 1996, Pastore was ordained bishop in the titular see of Forontoniana, retiring in 2003.
