= Nazzal al-Armouti =

Jordanian politician and diplomat (1924–2015)

Mohamed Nazzal al-Armouti (16 July 1924 – 19 August 2015) was a Jordanian civil servant, diplomat and politician. He was governor of several of the Governorates of Jordan between 1955 and 1961. He later served as Interior Minister between 1964 and 1965. Subsequently, he was the Jordanian ambassador to Algeria, Kuwait, Libya and Tunisia.

== Career ==
Al-Armouti was born on 16 July 1924, in Amman. He went to school in Amman and Al-Salt, and he later studied at Damascus University in Syria and the University of Exeter in the United Kingdom, obtaining a bachelor of law in 1946. In 1948, al-Armouti became secretary general of the Interior Ministry of Jordan. He held several other functions in the bureaucracy before starting a string of governorships between 1955 and 1961, including Hebron, Irbid, Karak, Ma'an, Nablus and Salt.

In 1961, he became under-secretary at the Interior Ministry. He was Interior Minister between 1964 and 1965. Immediately after his term as minister he became the Jordanian ambassador to the three North African countries Algeria, Libya and Tunisia, in which capacity he served in 1965. Between 1967 and 1971, he was Jordan's ambassador to Kuwait. After a stint as head of the political department of the Ministry of Foreign Affairs he subsequently retired in 1971. He later served as chairman of the Jordan Gulf Bank.

Al-Armouti died on 19 August 2015, aged 91.
