= Győző Soós =

Hungarian politician

Member of the National Assembly
- In office 28 June 1994 – 15 May 2006

Personal details
- Born: 11 November 1948 Miskolc, Hungary
- Died: 26 August 2015 (aged 66) Budapest, Hungary
- Party: MSZMP (1972–1989); MSZP (1989–2015)
- Spouse: Mária Csáki
- Children: Viktor; Péter
- Profession: politician

Győző Soós (11 November 1948 – c. 26 August 2015) was a Hungarian politician, Member of Parliament between 1994 and 2006 (MSZP). He represented Sátoraljaújhely from 1994 to 1998, after that he was elected MP from the Socialist Party's Borsod-Abaúj-Zemplén County Regional List.

Soós died on 26 August 2015 at the age of 66, following a long illness.
