= Jean Louvet (playwright) =

Belgian playwright

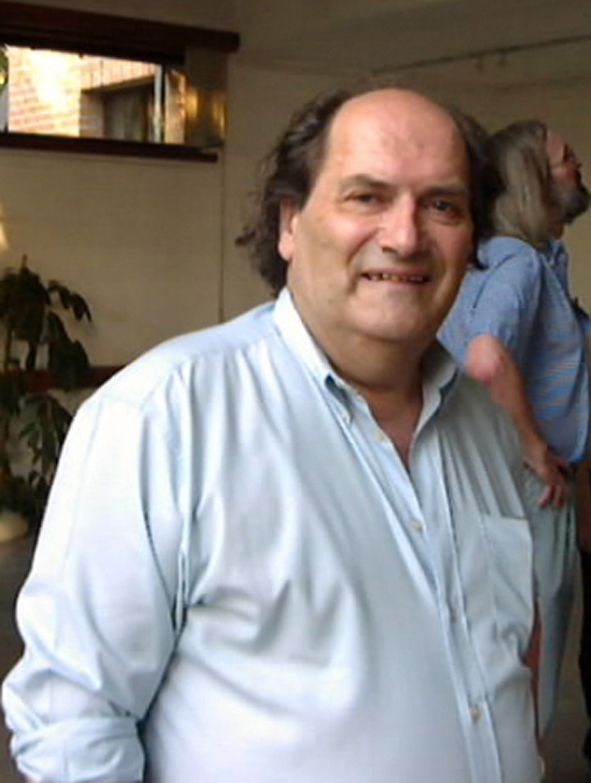
- Born: 28 September 1934; Moustier-sur-Sambre, Belgium
- Died: 29 August 2015 (aged 80); La Louvière, Belgium
- Occupation: playwright

Jean Louvet (28 September 1934 – 29 August 2015) was a Belgian playwright.

He was born in Moustier-sur-Sambre, the son of a miner, and lived a working-class childhood. Three years in the army paid for his studies in Romance philology, and he spent time in academia, but turned to the theater to give expression to his left-wing politics and founded a "proletarian theater". His work is influenced by Sartre and Brecht, by his Walloon roots and one of the most important event of the present-day Wallonia, the 1960–1961 Winter General Strike.

For some years, political considerations kept his work out of Wallonia and he is better known in France. However, he was awarded the "Bologne-Lemaire Walloon of the Year" prize in 2002.

'Jean Louvet defends Walloon culture and identity while believing in a certain utopist utopia'.
