= Laurie Strongin =

American writer and medical research activist

Laurie Strongin is an American author and medical research campaigner.

Strongin is the author of Saving Henry: A Mother's Journey. The 2010 book tells the story of her family's pioneering use of in vitro fertilization and preimplantation genetic diagnosis to try to save the life of her son, Henry Strongin Goldberg, who was born with the genetic disease Fanconi anemia. In December 2002, Henry ultimately died of the disease and complications related to a bone marrow transplant. Prior to his death, Henry was profiled in a New York Times magazine cover story and an episode of ABC News' Nightline.

In the years after her son's death, Strongin became an advocate for relaxing the ban on federal support for stem cell research. She and her husband, Allen Goldberg, appeared with then-House Minority Leader Nancy Pelosi (D-CA) and Rep. Diana DeGette (D-CO) in a press conference to urge the passage the Senate companion legislation to the House of Representatives' Stem Cell Research Enhancement Act of 2005.

Strongin also published an op-ed in The Washington Post on July 23, 2006, titled "Vetoing Henry", which took issue with President George W. Bush's veto a week earlier of Congress's attempt to remove funding restrictions on human embryonic stem cell research. This veto was the first of George W. Bush's presidency. On May 16, 2023, she published another op-ed in The Washington Post, titled “Remember, St. Jude Isn’t the Only Children’s Cancer Charity in Town,” reminding donors to think about how they choose the organizations they support.

In addition to her advocacy work, Strongin founded a non-profit, Hope for Henry Foundation, that reinvents how hospitals care for children and families through innovative, scientifically tested programs that help hospitalized kids confront the challenges of serious illness, adhere to their medical plans, and thrive. Awards include: Children's National Health System's Chairman's Special Award, Georgetown Pediatrics Flame of Hope Award, Children's Charities Foundation Star for Children Award, JWI's Women to Watch, Irene and Abe Pollin Humanitarian Award, Center for Nonprofit Advancement's EXCEL Award for Excellence in Nonprofit Leadership, and recognition as a People magazine, "Heroes Among Us." In April 2024, Laurie delivered a TEDx Talk, "Silver Linings: Nudging Kids Towards Better Health."
