= New Square, New York =

New Square, New York שיכון סקווירא
- Village
- Location in Rockland County and the state of New York.

- Location within the state of New York and the USA New Square (the United States)
- Coordinates: 41°8′23″N 74°1′42″W
- Country: United States
- State: New York
- County: Rockland
- Town: Ramapo
- Incorporated: November 6, 1961

Government
  - Mayor: Israel Spitzer
  - Trustees: Abraham Kohl, Hirsch Unger, Jacob Unger and Uri Braun

Area
  - Total: 0.37 sq mi (0.95 km^{2})
  - Land: 0.37 sq mi (0.95 km^{2})
  - Water: 0 sq mi (0.00 km^{2})
- Elevation: 490 ft (150 m)

Population (2020)
  - Total: 9,679
  - Estimate (2025): 10,214 ▲
  - Density: 27,605/sq mi (10,658/km^{2})
- Time zone: UTC-5 (Eastern (EST))
  - Summer (DST): UTC-4 (EDT)
- ZIP code: 10977
- Area code: 845
- FIPS code: 36-50705
- GNIS feature ID: 0971939
- Website: Official website

New Square (Yiddish: שיכון סקווירא, romanized: Shikun Skvira) is an all-Hasidic village in the town of Ramapo, Rockland County, New York, United States. It is located north of Hillcrest, east of Viola, south of New Hempstead, and west of New City. As of the 2020 United States census, it had a population of 9,679. Its inhabitants are predominantly members of the Skverer Hasidic movement who seek to maintain a Hasidic lifestyle disconnected from the secular world. It is the poorest town (measured by median income) in New York, and the eighth poorest in the United States. It also has the highest poverty rate, at 64.4%.

== History ==
New Square is named after the Ukrainian town Skvyra, where the Skverer Hasidic group originated. The founders intended to name the settlement New Skvir, but a typist's error anglicized the name. New Square was established in 1954, when the Zemach David Corporation, representing Skverer Grand Rabbi Yakov Yosef Twersky, purchased a 130-acre (0.53 km^{2}) dairy farm near Spring Valley, New York, in the town of Ramapo. At that time, most Skverer members lived in the Williamsburg section of Brooklyn. New Square's founders had felt that the Hasidic community in Williamsburg was being "threatened by assimilation", as The New York Times later described it. Construction began in 1956, and the first four families moved to New Square in December 1956. In 1958, the settlement had 68 houses.

The development of New Square was obstructed by Ramapo's zoning regulations, which forbade the construction of multi-family houses and the use of basements for shops and stores. Multiple families sharing single-family houses said that they belonged to extended families, and businesses in private homes had to be secret. In 1959, the community asked for a building permit to expand its synagogue, located in the basement of a Cape Cod-style house. The Ramapo town attorney requested condemnation of the entire New Square community, claiming that it threatened sewage lines. In response, the community requested incorporation as a village, but Ramapo town officials refused to allow it. In 1961, a New York state court ruled in favor of New Square, and the village was incorporated in July of that year.

After incorporating, New Square set its own zoning and building codes, legalizing the existing houses, and the liens disappeared. Lots were sold, and new houses were built. The basement businesses could trade openly, and new businesses were founded, including a watch assembly plant and a cap manufacturer. Three knitting mills and a used car lot opened, but most men continued to go to work in New York City. A Kollel was opened in 1963. In 1968, Grand Rabbi Yakov Yosef Twersky died; he was succeeded as Grand Rabbi by his son David Twersky.

In New Square's first mayoral election in 1961, Mates Friesel was chosen unopposed. Friesel was re-elected every two years until his death in 2015, thereby becoming one of the longest-serving mayors in the United States.

== Culture ==
The population of New Square is made up exclusively of Hasidic Jews, mostly from the Skverer Hasidic movement, who wish to maintain a Hasidic lifestyle while keeping outside influences to a minimum. The predominant language spoken in New Square is Yiddish.

Young people typically marry around 18 to 20 years of age. Girls finish high school at around age 17, and then marry. Custom dictates that women who marry men from other Hasidic communities leave New Square. Some women who left New Square settled in the Borough Park community in Brooklyn and the Monsey community in Ramapo, where the community is not as tightly knit. Men who marry women from outside of the community are encouraged to leave New Square. This is due to a shortage of space; thus, new housing is granted to couples of which both members are from the community.

In 2005, the community's rabbinical court ruled that women should not drive cars. In a 2003 article, Lisa W. Foderaro of The New York Times described New Square as "extremely insular", and said that the community's residents do not own televisions or radios.

== Economy ==
Young women, prior to entering marriage, and before they have children, work as teachers, secretaries, and bookkeepers, or they work in the New Square shopping center as cashiers and clerks. Some of the women, after having children, work as bookkeepers in their homes. Young men work as teachers, bus drivers, deliverymen, and store clerks. Some work as computer programmers, or as craftsmen and entrepreneurs in the diamond industry. Many study in the kollel, a yeshiva for married men, and receive stipends to support their families.

In 1970, the village had the lowest per-capita income in New York State. In 1963, four persons received welfare due to illness. One dozen people received welfare in 1975. In 1992, the village administrator said that in 1975, about two thirds of the families received food stamps and Medicaid.

According to the 2000 census, the median income for a household in the village was $12,162, and the median income for a family was $12,208. Males had a median income of $21,696, versus $29,375 for females. The per capita income for the village was $5,237. About 67.0% of families and 72.5% of the population were below the poverty line, including 77.3% of those under age 18 and 14.7% of those age 65 or over.

2007 and 2008 reports from the State of New York stated that 89.8% of the village consisted of low-income and moderate-income residents.

As of 2018, New Square is by far the poorest town in New York, with a median annual household income of $21,773, which is nearly $5,000 below that of Kiryas Joel, the next poorest town in the state, and only about a third of the median income across the state as a whole.

Not only is it the poorest town in New York state, but New Square also has the highest poverty and SNAP (food stamps) recipiency rates of any town in the United States. Some 70.0% of New Square residents live in poverty, and 77.1% of area households rely on SNAP benefits to afford food. In comparison, 15.1% of Americans live below the poverty line, and 13.0% of households nationwide receive SNAP benefits.

== Geography ==
According to the United States Census Bureau, the village has a total area of 0.4 square mile (0.9 km^{2}), all land.

== Demographics ==
Historical population
Census	Pop.	Note	%±
1970	1,156		—
1980	1,750		51.4%
1990	2,605		48.9%
2000	4,624		77.5%
2010	6,944		50.2%
2020	9,679		39.4%
2025 (est.)	10,214		5.5%
U.S. Decennial Census

In 1963, the settlement had 85 families and a total of 620 inhabitants. By 1967, this increased to 126 families and 812 total residents. The community celebrated ten marriages in 1967. In 1970, the village had 1,156 inhabitants, with 57% of the population under the age of 18.

The village had around one hundred births each year from 1971 to 1986. By that year, the village had 140 one-, two-, and three-family houses, a 45-unit low-rent apartment complex, 2,100 people, and 450 families, with an average of 7 to 8 children per family. During the late 1970s, the Town of Ramapo denied New Square's attempt to annex land. Six years later, in March 1982, New Square gained the legal right to annex 95 acres (380,000 m^{2}) of land.

New Square's population increased 77.5% between 1990 and 2000. In 2005, the village contained approximately 7,830 residents; 1,350 families, with 5.8 persons per family. Robert Zeliger of Rockland Magazine described New Square in 2007 as "a densely packed haven where Hasidic residents live largely by their own customs and laws". In November 2008, a new water tower serving New Square and the hamlet of Hillcrest opened, increasing residents' water pressure.

=== 2020 census ===
As of the 2020 census, New Square had a population of 9,679. The median age was 14.8 years. 58.4% of residents were under the age of 18 and 3.5% of residents were 65 years of age or older. For every 100 females, there were 105.3 males, and for every 100 females age 18 and over, there were 101.8 males age 18 and over.

100.0% of residents lived in urban areas, while 0.0% lived in rural areas.

There were 1,826 households in New Square, of which 74.8% had children under the age of 18 living in them. Of all households, 87.5% were married-couple households, 4.9% were households with a male householder and no spouse or partner present, and 7.4% were households with a female householder and no spouse or partner present. About 5.7% of all households were made up of individuals, and 2.6% had someone living alone who was 65 years of age or older.

There were 1,892 housing units, of which 3.5% were vacant. The homeowner vacancy rate was 0.9% and the rental vacancy rate was 1.1%.

Racial composition as of the 2020 census
Race	Number	Percent
White	9,326	96.4%
Black or African American	15	0.2%
American Indian and Alaska Native	8	0.1%
Asian	5	0.1%
Native Hawaiian and Other Pacific Islander	0	0.0%
Some other race	144	1.5%
Two or more races	181	1.9%
Hispanic or Latino (of any race)	58	0.6%

=== 2000 census ===
As of the 2000 census, there were 4,624 people, 820 households, and 786 families residing in the village. The population density was 12,811.8 inhabitants per square mile (4,946.7/km^{2}). There were 838 housing units, at an average density of 2,321.9 per square mile (896.5/km^{2}). The racial make-up of the village was 96.95% White, 1.64% African American, 0.89% Asian, and 0.52% from two or more races. Hispanic or Latino of any race were 0.41% of the population. 87.26% speak Yiddish at home, 7.68% English, and 4.11% Hebrew.

There were 820 households, out of which 77.8% had children under the age of 18 living with them, 92.6% were married couples living together, 2.0% had a female householder with no husband present, and 4.1% were non-families. 3.9% of all households were made up of individuals, and 3.3% had someone living alone who was 65 years of age or older. The average household size was 5.64, and the average family size was 5.81.

In the village, the population was spread out, with 60.5% under the age of 18, 13.9% from 18 to 24, 15.9% from 25 to 44, 7.1% from 45 to 64, and 2.6% who were 65 years of age or older. The median age was 14 years. For every 100 females, there were 105.7 males. For every 100 females age 18 and over, there were 104.7 males. The median income for a household in the village was $21,172, and the median income for a family was $21,758. Males had a median income of $35,871, versus $21,389 for females. The per capita income for the village was $6,585. About 58.0% of families and 58.7% of the population were below the poverty line, including 60.9% of those under age 18 and 36.2% of those age 65 or over.

=== Demographic estimates ===
A 2007 report stated that each year, one half of the women between ages 18 and 25 gave birth.

== Government and infrastructure ==
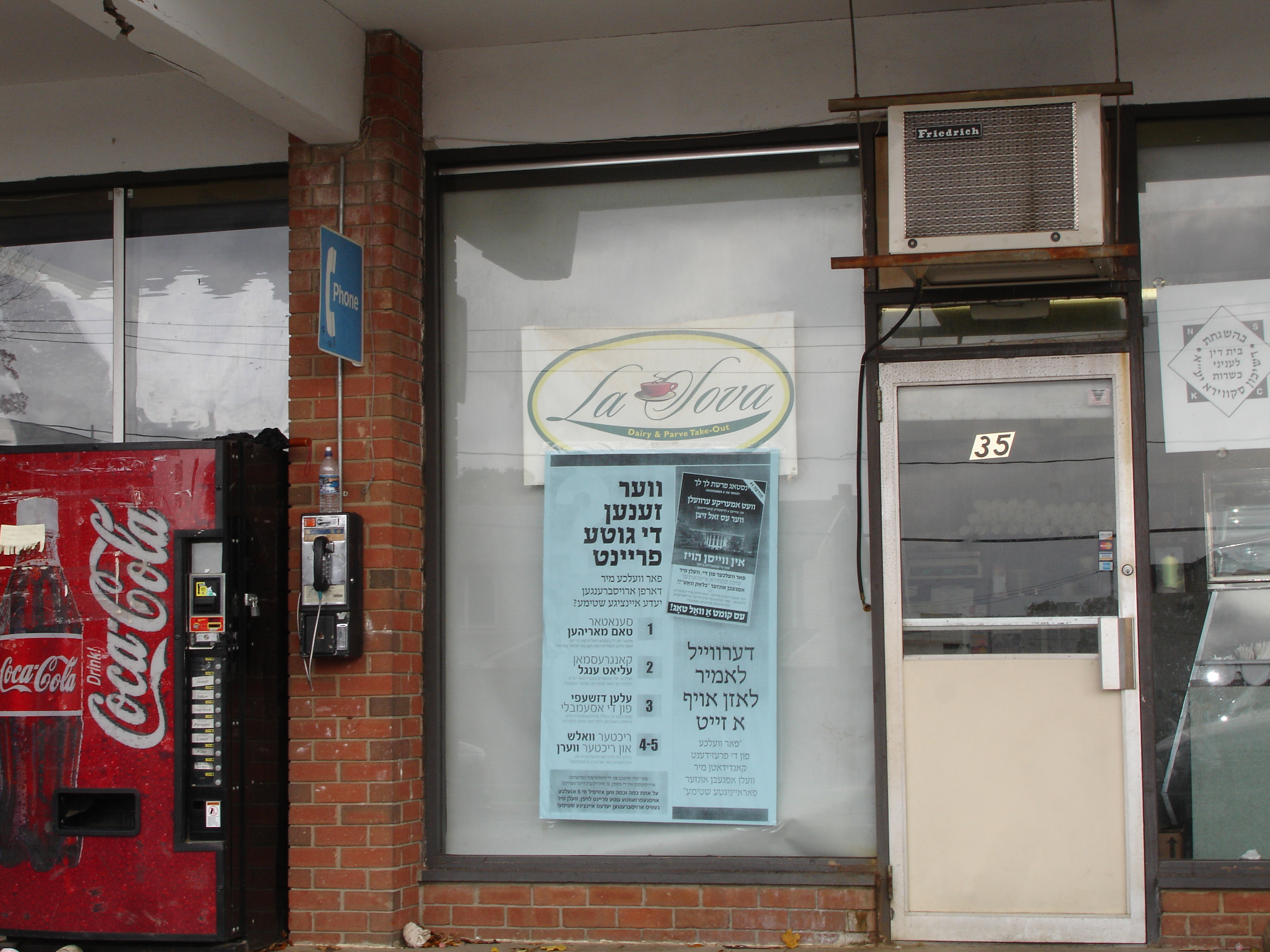
A 2008 election poster in front of a store in New Square, entirely in Yiddish. The candidate names are written in Yiddish.

As of 1992, the Village of New Square has a mayor, a mayor's assistant, a board of trustees, a village clerk, and a justice of the peace. The mayor's assistant performs the bulk of administrative work. The justice of the peace mainly handles harassment cases perpetrated by outsiders within New Square.

The Hillcrest Fire Department (also known as the Moleston Fire District) provides fire protection services to New Square. In March 2007, the fire district met with Town of Ramapo supervisors, and proposed removing New Square from its fire district, after a February 7, 2007, fire that destroyed two buildings in New Square. Further hazards stem from the fact that the town has only one main access road (Washington Avenue), and the failure of some residents to yield to emergency vehicles, or to the crowd of people on the streets surrounding an incident. There also have been isolated cases of residents tampering with fire equipment while responders are on scene.

The fire department felt concern about a lack of fire protection in buildings in New Square. On March 29, 2007, Ramapo town officials met fire district officials and fire department chiefs. On April 4 of that year, the fire district announced that New Square would remain in the fire district. Christopher St. Lawrence, the Town of Ramapo supervisor, said that the town is considering a "public safety loan program" to help New Square residents install life safety devices such as smoke alarms and sprinkler systems.

In 1989, New Square funded their own health clinic, called Refuah Health Center. The New Square Cemetery is located on Bais Hachaim Way. The village has a Hatzalah ambulance service branch, part of the Rockland County chapter, and has a public safety department that patrols the village.

New Square is within the 97th Assembly District in the New York State Assembly, which is represented by John W. McGowan. New Square is within Senate District 38 in the New York State Senate, which is represented by William Weber Jr.

=== Community norms ===
There is a strong expectation that residents of New Square will conform to community norms; for example, by worshiping at the community's synagogue and conforming to the Hasidic lifestyle. Generally, conformity by those who do not comply voluntarily is enforced by the powers of the kehillah, a council appointed by the rebbe, whose members control most community institutions. Those who have not conformed voluntarily have faced vigilante justice, as exemplified by the New Square arson attack and other incidents. The rebbe has denounced this practice, saying, "The use of force and violence to make a point or settle an argument violates Skver's most fundamental principles."

== Education ==
Yeshiva Avir Yakov, a private school with its own locations and separate boys' and girls' schooling, is the sole primary and secondary school in the community. It is statistically counted as Avir Yaakov Boys School (Yeshiva Avir Yakov Boys' School) and Avir Yaakov Girls School.

Although the town is within the East Ramapo Central School District, all children of New Square attend the local private Jewish pre-K-12 schools. The zoned public schools are Summit Park Elementary (Kindergarten-grade 3), Kakiat Elementary School (grades 4–6), Pomona Middle School (grades 7–8), and Ramapo High School (grades 9–12).

== Notable people ==
- Mayer Schiller
- Lipa Schmeltzer

=== Rabbis ===
- Ephraim Padwa
- Yehoshua Rokeach of Machnovka
- Menachem Mendel Hager

== Notable company ==
- Monsey Trails

== Fraudulent grant scheme ==
In May 1997, five Hasidic men from New Square and one man from Brooklyn were indicted on charges of defrauding the federal and state governments of tens of millions of dollars in education grants, subsidies, and loans. According to prosecutors, the men enrolled thousands of ineligible or nonexistent students in a fictitious school in order to obtain millions of dollars in federal Pell grants, which they used to enrich themselves and benefit the community institutions. The indictment drew sharp criticism in New Square. A statement by village representatives accused authorities of having a vendetta against New Square residents, and acting "in a manner remindful of the Holocaust," during the investigations.

Four of the men—Benjamin Berger, Jacob Elbaum, David Goldstein, and Kalmen Stern—were convicted in 1999 and received prison sentences ranging from 30 to 78 months. Two other suspects who were indicted fled the United States.

Hillary Clinton met with New Square-area Hasidic leaders as part of her Senate campaign. Michael Duffy and Karen Tumulty of Time Magazine said that "as far as anyone knows, that was a campaign event only; no pardons were mentioned". Hillary Clinton attended another session with the men, who wanted to see the four Hasidic leaders released. After Hillary Clinton was voted in as a senator, during the morning of December 22, Twersky and an associate visited Bill Clinton in the White House Map Room in Washington, D.C., and asked him to pardon the four men. Hillary Clinton attended the meeting; she said that she did not participate in it and did not discuss the meeting with her husband.

On January 20, 2001, President Clinton commuted the sentences of the men; Berger's sentence became two years, and the other men each had 30 months. Federal prosecutors investigated the pardons to see if they were made in exchange for political support. A 2001 ABC News article stated that some people wondered whether the pardons occurred as a kind of favor because the Village of New Square had voted overwhelmingly for Hillary Clinton for her first senate term (1359 out of 1369 votes – in contrast to two other Hasidic communities nearby who voted overwhelmingly Republican) – or if the pardons occurred as part of a quid pro quo swap for votes. Hillary Clinton said that she was not involved in the pardons, and that her husband pardoned the men out of clemency. In 2002 the prosecutors closed the investigation with no action.

== Kiryas Square ==
Due to population growth and a housing shortage in New Square, the Skver Hasidim had plans to expand to a new 400-acre (1.6 km^{2}) village named Kiryas Square in the hamlet of Spring Glen, New York. The property, the former Homowack Resort, was purchased by the Skver community in 2006. Dedication of the site was in August 2007. The New York State Department of Health cited the property which was used as a summer camp for girls for "numerous, persistent, and serious violations", including inoperable fire alarms, pervasive mold, and water running over electrical boxes. The health department issued a mandatory order of evacuation. In addition to problems with the health department, some local residents have also voiced opposition to the building of a Hasidic village. The site was evacuated in August 2009, as a result of a judge's deadline.

As of 2024, a new location for the construction of a new Skverer village, also named Kiryas Skver, was found and construction has begun, with many Skver members from Boro Park already having purchased homes in the village.

== See also ==
- Kaser, New York − an all-Hasidic village in the same county
- Kiryas Joel, New York − an all-Hasidic coterminous town-village in a neighboring county
- Qırmızı Qəsəbə − a nearly-all-Jewish village in Azerbaijan
- Chernobyl (Hasidic dynasty)
