= Alison Magaya =

South Sudanese politician and diplomat (died 2015)

Alison Magaya (died 24 August 2015) was a South Sudanese politician and diplomat. He served as interior minister up until 2013, before being named the South Sudanese ambassador to Switzerland. Magaya died in Geneva, Switzerland on 24 August 2015 after a brief undisclosed illness.

== See also ==
- Cabinet of South Sudan
