= Brian Hord =

British chartered surveyor and politician

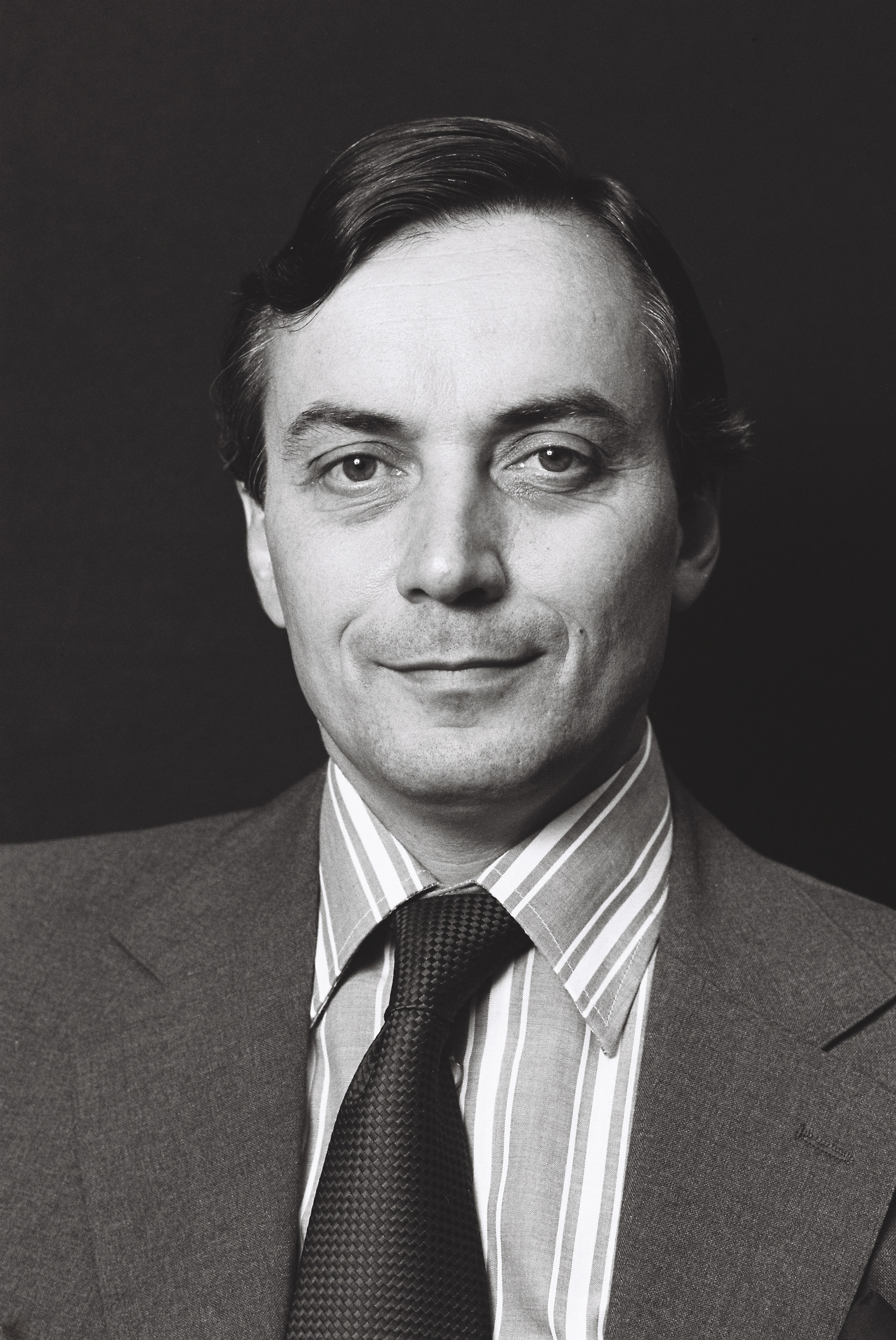
European Parliament portrait

Brian Howard Hord CBE FRICS (20 June 1934 – 30 August 2015) was a British chartered surveyor and politician. He served for one term as a Member of the European Parliament (MEP) and maintained his involvement in the Conservative Party and in public life; he was chairman of a health authority for six years.

== Professional career ==
Hord was brought up in the Reedham Orphanage School in London, from where he went to Purley County Grammar School. He was first employed at the age of 16 in the County Planning Department of Middlesex County Council, before joining G. L. Hearn & Partners as a surveyor. His education was completed at Regent Street Polytechnic and his National service took place between 1957 and 1959 in the Royal Air Force, and after the end he joined United Drapery Stores as an estates surveyor. In 1966 he moved towards residential property as an estates surveyor for housebuilders Richard Costain Ltd and in 1970 he became a Director of Capcount UK Ltd, which was a subsidiary of the Capital and Counties Property Company. Hord set up his own company of chartered surveyors, Howard Hord & Palmer, in 1975.

== Politics ==
He became involved in politics in the early 1970s, and at the February 1974 general election he fought the Darlington constituency for the Conservative Party. Hord managed a swing of 1.9% to the Conservatives, cutting the Labour majority to just over 2,000 against the national trend. He fought the seat again in the October election but lost this ground back to Labour, in line with national trends.

== European Parliament ==
For the 1979 European Parliament elections, Hord was selected as Conservative Party candidate for London West. The constituency included Labour-voting areas but in the election Labour performed poorly and Hord was elected with a comfortable majority. In February 1980 he made a speech in the European Parliament calling for a boycott of the 1980 Summer Olympics in Moscow after the Soviet invasion of Afghanistan and the internal exile of Andrei Sakharov; he attacked the European Commission's policy as "incredibly absurd, arrogant, insensitive and inept". He also opposed the sale of surplus EEC butter to the Soviets, criticising Commission President Roy Jenkins for allowing the sale to happen after announcing that it had ceased.

In October 1980 Hord was one of three Conservative MEPs to refuse a new office when a new block was opened in Strasbourg; the three protested that the building was too expensive and that it would confirm Strasbourg as the main seat of the Parliament. He objected to Labour Party leader Michael Foot's claim that Margaret Thatcher's policies were responsible for the 1981 Toxteth riots, blaming instead "small groups of militants .. who have succeeded in disrupting society with the interest of overturning our democratic system".

== Farm prices ==
Hord was one of the most prominent Conservative MEPs and as the annual meeting of the group approached in January 1982, he was mentioned as a possible candidate for group leader; however, he decided not to stand. As a city-based member he opposed increased farm prices, but did manage to persuade the commission to reconsider a plan to subsidise conversion of the 'wine lake' into industrial alcohol. Although he could be highly critical of European institutions, Hord was willing to put the case for EEC membership: he felt investors would need access to a tariff-free market. He was a Whip for the European Democratic Group from 1982 to 1983.

== Post-European Parliament career ==
At the 1984 European Parliament election, Hord had boundary changes in his constituency; the areas making up the new seat had a Conservative majority of 14% at the 1983 general election. However, Hord was unable to defend his seat and lost to Labour candidate Michael Elliott. He returned to business but accepted public appointments as a member of the London Rent Assessment Panel from 1985 to 2005, and was Chairman of Bexley Health Authority from 1986 to 1992. Hord was awarded the CBE in 1989.

Hord was Director General of the Bureau of European Building Consultants and Experts from 1991 to 1995. As a rail commuter, Hord served on the London Regional Passengers' Committee from 1997 to 2000 and was Chairman of Sevenoaks Rail Travellers' Association in 2001–02. He formed and chaired Bexhill Rail Action Group from 2005 until 2009 and was vice-president of Sevenoaks Conservative Association from 1997 and vice-chairman of Bexhill and Battle Conservative Association from 2003.

He died on 30 August 2015.
