= Amelia Womack =

British politician (born 1985)

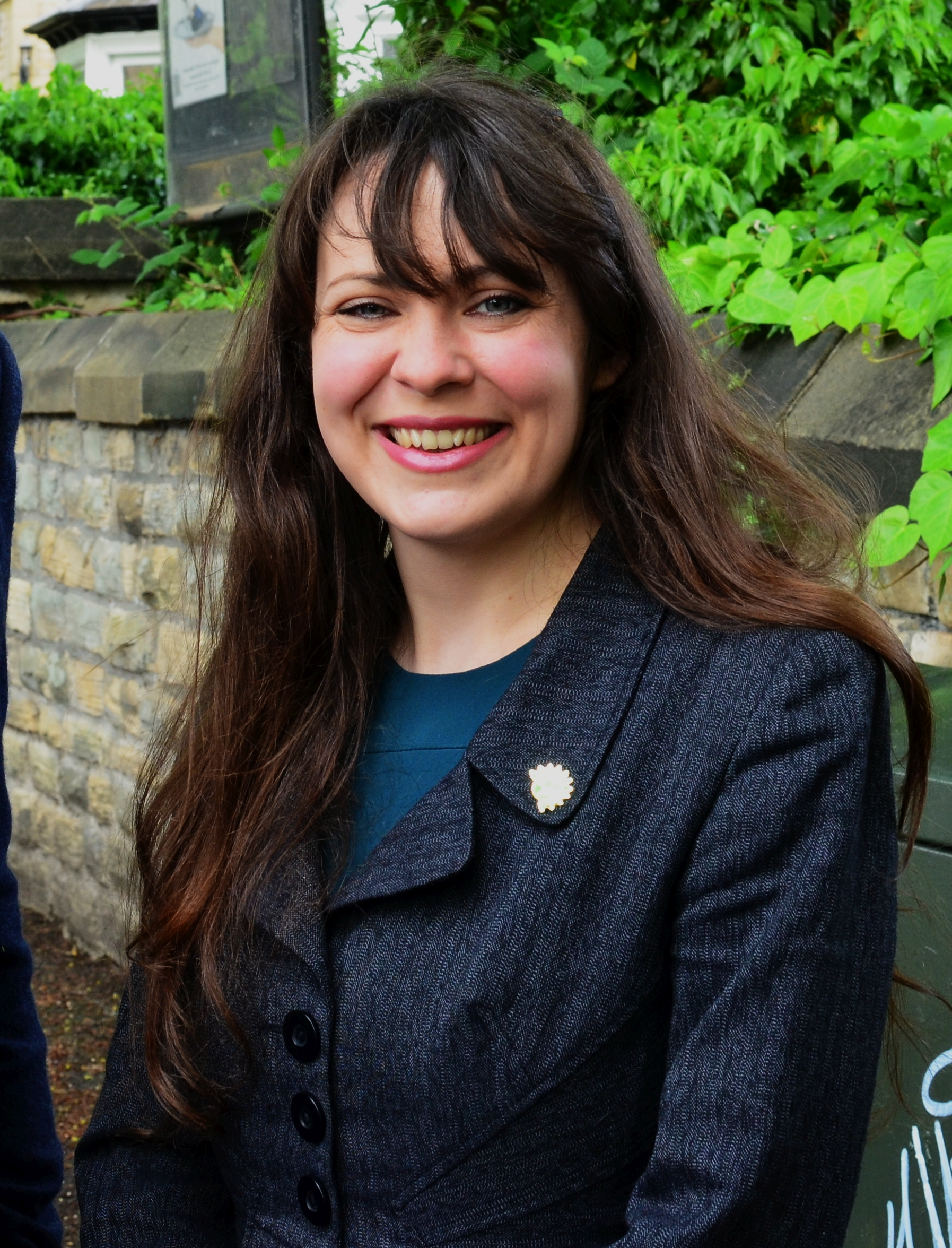
- Womack in May 2017

Deputy Leader of the Green Party of England and Wales
- In office 1 September 2014 – 7 September 2022 Serving with Shahrar Ali (2014–2016)
- Leader: Natalie Bennett; Caroline Lucas; Jonathan Bartley; Siân Berry; Adrian Ramsay; Carla Denyer
- Preceded by: Will Duckworth
- Succeeded by: Zack Polanski

Personal details
- Born: Amelia Helen Womack; 12 January 1985 (age 41) Newport, Wales
- Party: Green Party of England and Wales
- Education: Bassaleg School
- Alma mater: University of Liverpool (BSc); Imperial College London (MSc)

Amelia Helen Womack (born 12 January 1985) is a former British Green Party of England and Wales politician. She served as the party's Deputy Leader from 2014 to 2022. She was a co-chair of the People's Assembly Against Austerity, and co-founded Another Europe Is Possible.

She served as Deputy Leader of the Green Party of England and Wales alongside Shahrar Ali from 2014 to 2016. She was re-elected in September 2016, once again in September 2018 and then again in September 2020. Womack stood as her party's lead candidate in the South Wales East region in the 2021 Senedd election; she was not elected. Womack also stood on a joint ticket with Tamsin Omond in the 2021 Green Party leadership election, in which they finished in second place of five candidates vying for the party's leadership.

== Education ==
Womack was born in Newport in South Wales. She attended Bassaleg School, a state comprehensive school in the suburb of Bassaleg, from 1996 to 2003. She studied a BSc in Environmental Biology at Liverpool University, and went on to complete an MSc in environmental technology at Imperial College London in 2009, with a thesis entitled Who's afraid of environmental law? How the law of Ecocide can secure our environment for business resilience.

== Political career ==
Womack joined the Green Party around 2000. She stood as a Green candidate for Herne Hill ward on Lambeth Council, in the 2014 United Kingdom local elections, and for London in the 2014 European Parliament election, though she won neither seat.

She was elected deputy leader of the Green Party in September 2014, delivering her first speech in the role at the party's conference on 6 September. Having been elected at the age of 29, Womack is the youngest deputy leader of any political party in the UK.

She stood in the Camberwell and Peckham constituency in the 2015 general election, finishing third with just over 10% of the vote.

In September 2015, Womack announced her intention to stand for the Wales Green Party in the 2016 National Assembly for Wales election. The Welsh Green Party announced in late October that she had been selected as the lead candidate for the regional South Wales Central (proportional representation) list as well as for the Cardiff Central constituency.

Womack's re-election as Deputy Leader of the Green Party of England and Wales was announced at the party conference in early September 2016. She served a second two-year term.

Through her work campaigning to end ecocide, she has worked with Vivienne Westwood to promote the change in environmental law and attempt to secure the one million votes required for a European Citizens' Initiative.

In August 2016, she criticised Byron Hamburgers after they worked with the Home Office to call their London workers to a fake Health and Safety briefing, whereat immigration officials present at the venue arrested several employees, deporting 35 for immigration offences. Womack was quoted as saying "It's about the family and friends of people who are left behind as well. You don't need to be pro-migration to realise that employing people, having them pay tax and contribute to the company for years and then turn them over to authorities without any responsibility for the chaos caused is the wrong thing to do".

In March 2017, Womack reported the Daily Mail newspaper to the Independent Press Standards Organisation over a front page photo of Theresa May and Nicola Sturgeon with the caption "Never mind Brexit, who won Legs-it". In her submission she said: "This headline and the further derogatory comments inside the paper would not have even been considered, let alone published, if the two politicians in question had been men".

Womack was again re-elected Deputy Leader of the Green Party of England and Wales in September 2018.

In January 2019 she apologised for tweeting a picture accused of being antisemitic.

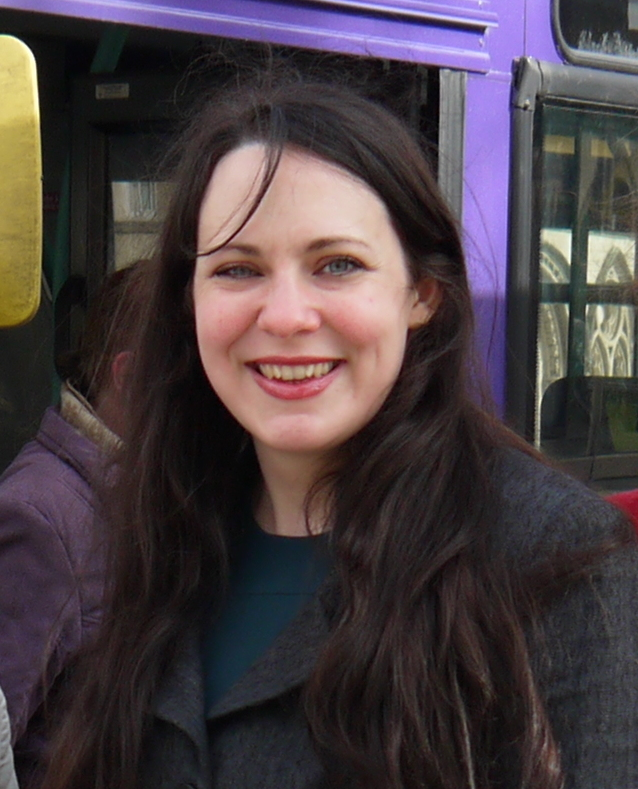
Amelia Womack in February 2019

In February 2019, it was announced that Womack would be the Wales Green Party candidate in the 2019 Newport West by-election, a position she had nominally been selected for in November 2018. The by-election was held on 4 April 2019 and Womack finished in sixth place in a field of 11 candidates, with 924 votes (3.9% of the total votes cast).

In August 2019, Womack was again nominated by the Wales Green Party as the candidate for Newport West in a prospective snap general election. Womack stood in the 2019 general election. She again came in sixth place, but this time out of a field of six candidates. She achieved a smaller share of the vote compared to the by-election, receiving 2.1% of the total votes cast.

In June 2020, Womack announced her intention to stand again as deputy leader. On 9 September 2020, it was announced that she had been re-elected by party members for a fourth term.

Womack stood as her party's lead candidate in the South Wales East region in the 2021 Senedd election.

In August 2021, Womack announced her candidacy on a joint ticket with Tamsin Omond for the 2021 Green Party of England and Wales leadership election. Their joint leadership ticket lost the leadership election to the joint ticket of Adrian Ramsay and Carla Denyer, coming in second place out of five candidates.

In March 2022, Womack announced that she would not be standing in the 2022 Green Party of England and Wales deputy leadership election.

Womack is no longer a politician and moved onto a career in environmentalism, currently working in advocacy for the Royal Society for the Protection of Birds.

== Electoral history ==
=== 2021 Senedd election ===
2021 Senedd election: South Wales East
List	Candidates	Votes	Of total (%)	± from prev.
Labour	Helen Cunningham, Peter Jones, Mary Brocklesby, Majid Rahman	85,988	41.4	▲3.1
Conservative	Laura Anne Jones, Natasha Asghar, Matthew Evans, Nick Evans, Gavin Chambers, Edward Dawson, Donna Gavin, Gareth Hughes	52,323	25.2	▲8.0
Plaid Cymru	Delyth Jewell, Peredur Owen Griffiths, Lindsay Whittle, Rhys Mills, Jonathan lark, Ian Gwynne, Daniel Llewelyn	30,530	14.7	▼0.6
Abolish	Mark Reckless, Richard Taylor, Stephen Jones, Michael Ford, Robert Steed, Hugh Hughes	9,995	4.8	▲0.7
Green	Amelia Womack, Ian Chandler, Lauren James, Stephen Priestnall	9,950	4.8	▲2.3
Liberal Democrats	Jo Watkins, Veronica German, Oliver Townsend, Jeremy Becker	7,045	3.4	▼0.1
UKIP	Neil Hamilton, Benjamin Walker, Thomas Harrison, Robert James	4,101	2.0	▼15.8
Reform	James Wells, Kirsty Walmsley, David Rowlands, Colin Jones, Robert Beavis	2,756	1.3	▲1.3
Gwlad	Calen Jones, Laurence Williams, Ryan Williams, Terry Beverton	1,841	0.9	▲0.9
No More Lockdowns	Gruff Meredith, Mattie Ginsburg	1,496	0.7	▲0.7
Propel	Kieran Gething, Anthony Nash, Celia Jones, Kristopher Ashley	924	0.4	▲0.4
Communist	Robert Griffiths, Bob Davenport, Glenn Eynon, Irene Green	606	0.3	0.0
TUSC	Mariam Kamish, Cammilla Mngaza, Melanie Benedict, Dave Reid	362	0.2	▼0.1

=== 2019 general election ===
2019 general election: Newport West
Party	Candidate	Votes	%	±%
Labour	Ruth Jones	18,977	43.7	−8.6
Conservative	Matthew Evans	18,075	41.6	+2.3
Liberal Democrats	Ryan Jones	2,565	5.9	+3.7
Brexit Party	Cameron Edwards	1,727	4.0	N/A
Plaid Cymru	Jonathan Clark	1,187	2.7	+0.3
Green	Amelia Womack	902	2.1	+0.9
Majority		902	2.1	−10.9
Turnout		43,433	65.2	−2.3
Registered electors		66,657		
Labour hold		Swing	−5.5	

=== 2019 by-election ===
2019 Newport West by-election
Party	Candidate	Votes	%	±%
Labour	Ruth Jones	9,308	39.6	−12.7
Conservative	Matthew Evans	7,357	31.3	−8.0
UKIP	Neil Hamilton	2,023	8.6	+6.1
Plaid Cymru	Jonathan Clarke	1,185	5.0	+2.5
Liberal Democrats	Ryan Jones	1,088	4.6	+2.4
Green	Amelia Womack	924	3.9	+2.8
Renew	June Davies	879	3.7	N/A
Abolish	Richard Suchorzewski	205	0.9	N/A
SDP	Ian McLean	202	0.9	N/A
Democrats and Veterans	Philip Taylor	185	0.8	N/A
For Britain	Hugh Nicklin	159	0.7	N/A
Majority		1,951	8.3	−4.7
Turnout		23,515	37.1	−30.5
Registered electors		63,623		
Labour hold		Swing	–2.4	

=== 2016 Welsh Assembly election ===
2016 Welsh Assembly Election: Cardiff Central
Party	Candidate	Votes	%	±%
Labour	Jenny Rathbone	10,016	38.4	+0.5
Liberal Democrats	Eluned Parrott	9,199	35.3	−2.4
Conservative	Joel Williams	2,317	8.9	−6.2
Plaid Cymru	Glyn Wise	1,951	7.5	+0.3
UKIP	Mohammed Islam	1,223	4.7	+4.7
Green	Amelia Womack	1,150	4.4	+4.4
Independent	Jane Croad	212	0.8	+0.8
Majority		817	3.1	+2.9
Turnout		26,068	45.6	+7.6
Labour hold		Swing	+1.7	

=== 2015 general election ===
2015 general election: Camberwell and Peckham
Party	Candidate	Votes	%	±%
Labour	Harriet Harman	32,614	63.3	+4.1
Conservative	Naomi Newstead	6,790	13.2	+0.1
Green	Amelia Womack	5,187	10.1	+7.1
Liberal Democrats	Yahaya Kiyingi	2,580	5.0	−17.4
UKIP	David Kurten	2,413	4.7	N/A
All People's Party	Prem Goyal	829	1.6	N/A
NHA	Rebecca Fox	466	0.9	N/A
TUSC	Nick Wrack	292	0.6	N/A
CISTA	Alex Robertson	197	0.4	N/A
Workers Revolutionary	Joshua Ogunleye	107	0.2	−0.3
Whig	Felicity Anscomb	86	0.2	N/A
Majority		25,824	50.1	+11.3
Turnout		51,561	62.3	+3.0
Registered electors		82,746		
Labour hold		Swing	+2.0	

=== 2014 European elections ===
2014 European election: London
List	Candidates	Votes	Of total (%)	± from prev.
Labour	Claude Moraes, Mary Honeyball, Lucy Anderson, Seb Dance, Ivana Bartoletti, Kamaljeet Jandu, Sanchia Alasia, Andrea Biondi	806,959 (201,739.75)	36.67	+15.4
Conservative	Syed Kamall, Charles Tannock, Marina Yannakoudakis, Caroline Attfield, Lynne Hack, Sheila Lawlor, Glyn Chambers, Annesley Abercorn	495,639 (247,819.5)	22.52	−4.8
UKIP	Gerard Batten, Paul Oakley, Elizabeth Jones, Lawrence Webb, Alastair McFarlane, Andrew McNeilis, Anthony Brown, Peter Whittle	371,133	16.87	+6.1
Green	Jean Lambert, Caroline Allen, Haroon Saad, Shahrar Ali, Danny Bates, Tracey Hague, Violeta Vajda, Amelia Womack	196,419	8.93	−2.0
Liberal Democrats	Sarah Ludford, Jonathan Fryer, Richard Davis, Anuja Prashar, Rosina Robson, Turhan Ozen, Simon James, Matt McLaren	148,013	6.73	−7.0
4 Freedoms Party	Dirk Hazell, NoelleAnne O'Sullivan, Geoff Gibas, Aline Doussin, Andrew Bell, Deborah Phillips, Royston Flude, Brendan Donnelly	28,014	1.27	N/A
An Independence from Europe	Patrick Burns, Marlene Daniel, Gareth Griffiths, Munpreet Bhathal, Sharon Greenfield, Eddie Yeoman, Fred Atkins, Jean Atkins	26,675	1.21	N/A
CPA	Sid Cordle, Yemi Awolola, Ashley Dickenson, Sharmilla Swarma, Laurence Williams, Ethel Odiete, Kevin Nicholls, Steven Hammond	23,702	1.08	−1.9
NHA	Louise Irvine, Chidi Ejimofo, Marcus Chown, Kathryn Anderson, Rufus Hound, Jessica Ormerod, Andrew Sharp, Alex Ashman	23,253	1.06	N/A
Animal Welfare	Vanessa Hudson, Alexander Bourke, Kirsteen Williamson-Guinn, Andrew Knight, Dimple Patel, Meg Mathews, Guy Dessoy, Ranjan Joshi	21,092	0.96	N/A
BNP	Stephen Squire, Donna Treanor, Paul Sturdy, John Clarke, David Furness, Cliff le May, Ray Underwood, Kevin Lazell	19,246	0.87	−4.1
Europeans Party	Tommy Tomescu, Andrzej Rygielski, Vanessa Del Carmen Guerrero Rodriguez, Robin Ashenden, Emil Rusanov, Georgios Papagrigorakis	10,712	0.5	N/A
English Democrat	Jenny Knight, Matthew Roberts, Maggi Young, Graham Clipperton, Gary Butler, Nick Capp, Louise Dutton, Natalie Smith	10,142	0.5	−0.9
Communities United	Kamran Malik, Humera Kamran, Cydatty Bogie, Mary Coleman Daniels, Idris Aden Ali, Reuben Edokpayi, Sunita Kaur Singh, Joanne Flanders	6,951	0.3	N/A
National Liberal	Graham Williamson, Jagdeesh Singh, Sockalingham Yogalingam, Doris Jones, Upkar Singh Rai, Yuseef Anwar, Araz Yurdseven, Bernard Dube	6,736	0.3	N/A
NO2EU	Edward Dempsey, Alexander Gordon, April Ashley, Annie Ngemi, Mary Davis, Paula Mitchell, Natasha Horau, Michael Clarty	3,804	0.2	N/A
Harmony Party	David Vincent	1,985	0.1	−0.84
Turnout		2,200,475	N/A	N/A

=== 2014 Lambeth London Borough Council election ===
Herne Hill (3)
Party	Candidate	Votes	%	±%
Labour	Michelle Agdomar	2,420	49.5	
Labour	Jim Dickson *	2,373		
Labour	Jack Holborn	2,198		
Green	Amelia Womack	1,357	27.8	
Green	Nicholas Edwards	1,269		
Green	Luke Hildyard	1,103		
Conservative	Claire Baker	470	9.6	
Conservative	Simon Hooberman	387		
Conservative	Heidi Nicholson	381		
Liberal Democrats	Jennifer Keen	351	7.2	
Liberal Democrats	Jonathan Price	241		
Liberal Democrats	Lawrence Price	187		
UKIP	Steven Stanbury	168	3.4	
TUSC	Louise Scott	121	2.5	
Total votes				
Labour hold		Swing		
Labour hold		Swing		
Labour hold		Swing		

== See also ==
- 2014 Green Party of England and Wales leadership election
- 2016 Green Party of England and Wales leadership election
- 2018 Green Party of England and Wales leadership election

Party political offices
Preceded by Will Duckworth	Deputy Leader of the Green Party of England and Wales; 2014–2022; With: Shahrar Ali (2014–2016)	Succeeded by Zack Polanski
