= London (European Parliament constituency) =

Former European Parliament constituency

- European Parliament constituency
- Location among the 2014 constituencies

- Shown in the United Kingdom
- Member state: United Kingdom
- Created: 1999
- Dissolved: 31 January 2020
- MEPs: 10 (1999–2004); 9 (2004–2009); 8 (2009–2020)

London was a constituency of the European Parliament from 1999 until the UK exit from the European Union on 31 January 2020.

Between 2009 and 2020, it returned eight MEPs, using the D'Hondt method of party-list proportional representation.

== Boundaries ==
The constituency corresponded to the Greater London region of England, in the south east of the United Kingdom.

== History ==
Prior to 1999, London was represented by a number of single-member constituencies. These were London Central, London East, London North, London North East, London North West, London South East, London South Inner, London South West, London West, and parts of London South and Surrey East.

The European Parliamentary Elections Act 1999 reduced this to a single constituency returning a number of MEPs.

MEPs for former London constituencies, 1979 – 1999
Election	1979 – 1984	1984 – 1989	1989 – 1994	1994 – 1999
London South (until 1984) London South and Surrey East (from 1984)	James Moorhouse; Conservative, Liberal Democrats (from 1998)			
London South West	Shelagh Roberts; Conservative		Anita Pollack; Labour	
London North West	Lord Bethell; Conservative			Robert Evans; Labour
London South East	Brandon Rhys-Williams; Conservative	Peter Price; Conservative		Shaun Spiers; Labour
London North	John Leslie Marshall; Conservative		Pauline Green; Labour/Co-operative	
London Central	David Nicolson; Conservative	Stan Newens; Labour/Co-operative		
London West	Brian Hord; Conservative	Michael Elliott; Labour		
London East	Alan Tyrrell; Conservative	Carole Tongue; Labour		
London South Inner	Richard Balfe; Labour			
London North East	Alfred Lomas; Labour			

== Returned members ==
Below are all the members since the creation of the London constituency. The number of seats allocated to London had been reduced from 10 to 8 between 1999 and 2009 due to EU enlargement. Members elected in 1999 who previously represented a London constituency were Pauline Green (London North, elected 1989) and Robert Evans (London North West, elected 1994).

MEPs for London, 1999 onwards
Election	1999 (5th parliament)	2004 (6th parliament)	2009 (7th parliament)	2014 (8th parliament)	2019 (9th parliament)
MEP Party	Jean Lambert; Green				Scott Ainslie; Green
MEP Party	Lord Bethell; Conservative	Gerard Batten; UKIP			Ben Habib; Brexit Party
MEP Party	Theresa Villiers; Conservative	Syed Kamall; Conservative			Lance Forman; Brexit Party (May–December 2019); Independent (December 2019 to 2020), Conservative Party (2020 to present)
MEP Party	Charles Tannock; Conservative				Irina von Wiese; Liberal Democrat
MEP Party	John Bowis; Conservative		Marina Yannakoudakis; Conservative	Lucy Anderson; Labour	Dinesh Dhamija; Liberal Democrat
MEP Party	Pauline Green; Labour	Mary Honeyball; Labour			Luisa Porritt; Liberal Democrat
MEP Party	Claude Moraes; Labour				
MEP Party	Sarah Ludford; Liberal Democrat			Seb Dance; Labour	
MEP Party	Robert Evans; Labour		Seat abolished		
MEP Party	Richard Balfe; Labour (1999–2002); Conservative (2002–04)	Seat abolished			

Key to political groups of the European Parliament (UK)
Party			Faction in European Parliament	
Brexit Party	29		Non-Inscrits	57
DUP	1		Non-Inscrits	57
Liberal Democrats	16	17	Renew Europe	108
Alliance	1	17	Renew Europe	108
Green	7	11	Greens–European Free Alliance	75
SNP	3	11	Greens–European Free Alliance	75
Plaid Cymru	1	11	Greens–European Free Alliance	75
Labour	10		Socialists and Democrats	154
Conservative	4		European Conservatives and Reformists Group	62
Sinn Féin	1		European United Left–Nordic Green Left	41
Total	73		Total	750

== Returned Members by seat ==
Seats allocated using d'Hondt method, in order. Transfers within parties between elections omitted for simplicity.

Election	1st MEP	2nd MEP	3rd MEP	4th MEP	5th MEP	6th MEP	7th MEP	8th MEP	9th MEP	10th MEP
1999	Labour (Pauline Green)	Con (Theresa Villiers)	Labour (Claude Moraes)	Con (Charles Tannock)	Labour (Robert Evans)	LD (Baroness Sarah Ludford)	Con (Nicholas Bethell)	Labour (Richard Balfe)	Con (John Bowis)	Green (Jean Lambert)
2004	Con (Theresa Villiers)	Labour (Claude Moraes)	LD (Baroness Sarah Ludford)	Con (John Bowis)	Labour (Mary Honeyball)	UKIP (Gerard Batten)	Con (Charles Tannock)	Green (Jean Lambert)	Labour (Robert Evans)	
2009	Con (Charles Tannock)	Labour (Claude Moraes)	LD (Baroness Sarah Ludford)	Con (Syed Kamall)	Green (Jean Lambert)	UKIP (Gerard Batten)	Labour (Mary Honeyball)	Con (Marina Yannakoudakis)		
2014	Labour (Claude Moraes)	Con (Syed Kamall)	Labour (Mary Honeyball)	UKIP (Gerard Batten)	Labour (Lucy Anderson)	Con (Charles Tannock)	Labour (Seb Dance)	Green (Jean Lambert)		
2019	LD (Irina von Wiese)	Labour (Claude Moraes)	Brexit (Benyamin Habib)	LD (Dinesh Dhamija)	Green (Scott Ainslie)	Labour (Seb Dance)	LD (Luisa Manon Porritt)	Brexit (Lance Forman)		

== Election results ==
Elected candidates are shown in bold. Brackets indicate the number of votes per seat won and order of MEPs elected.

=== 2019 ===
2019 results

2019 European election: London
List	Candidates	Votes	Of total (%)	± from prev.
Liberal Democrats	**Irina von Wiese** (1) **Dinesh Dhamija** (4) **Luisa Porritt** (7) Jonathan Fryer, Hussain Khan, Helen Cross, Graham Colley, Rabina Khan	608,725 (202,908.33)	27.2	+20.5
Labour	**Claude Moraes** (2) **Seb Dance** (6) Katy Clark, Laura Parker, Murad Qureshi, Taranjit Kaur Chana, James Beckles, Sanchia Alasia	536,810 (268,405)	23.9	−12.8
Brexit Party	**Ben Habib** (3) **Lance Forman** (8) Graham Shore, Alka Cuthbert, Jimi Ogunnusi, Simon Marcus, Mehrtash A'zami, Aileen Quinton	400,257 (200,128.5)	17.9	New
Green	**Scott Ainslie** (5) Gulnar Hasnain, Shahrar Ali, Rachel Collinson, Eleanor Margolies, Remco van der Stoep, Kirsten De Keyser, Peter Underwood	278,957	12.4	+3.5
Conservative	Syed Kamall, Charles Tannock, Joy Morrissey, Tim Barnes, Scott Pattenden, Attic Rahman, Kirsty Finlayson, Luke Parker	177,964	7.9	−14.6
Change UK	Gavin Esler, Jacek Rostowski, Carole Tongue, Annabel Mullin, Karen Newman, Nora Mulready, Jessica Simor, Haseeb Ur-Rehman	117,635	5.2	New
UKIP	Gerard Batten, Richard Braine, Peter Muswell, Freddy Vachha, Robert Stephenson, Peter McIlvenna, John Poynton, Ronie Johnson	46,497	2.1	−14.8
Animal Welfare	Vanessa Hudson, Jane Smith, Sam Morland, Ranjan Joshi, Mina Da Rui, Jonathan Homan, Simon Gouldman	25,232	1.1	+0.1
Women's Equality	Catherine Mayer, Bea Gare, Nanci Hogan, Aliyah Dunbar-Hussain, Hannah Barham-Brown, Alison Marshall, Olivia Vincenti, Leyla Mohan	23,766	1.1	New
UKEU	Pierre Kirk, Richard Stevens, Saleyha Ahsan, Anna Novikova, Angela Antetomaso, Richard Boardman	18,806	0.8	New
Independent	Claudia Mcdowell	1,036	0.0	New
Independent	Daze Aghaji	1,018	0.0	New
Independent	Roger Hallam	924	0.0	New
Independent	Kofi Klu	869	0.0	New
Independent	Andrea Venzon	731	0.0	New
Independent	Mike Shad	707	0.0	New
Independent	Zoe Lafferty	436	0.0	New
Independent	Andrew Medhurst	430	0.0	New
Independent	Alan Kirkby	401	0.0	New
Independent	Ian Sowden	254	0.0	New
Independent	Henry Muss	226	0.0	New
Turnout		2,241,681	41.3	

=== 2014 ===
2014 results

The 2014 results were delayed by Tower Hamlets, where there were recounts needed for six local election wards.

2014 European election: London
List	Candidates	Votes	Of total (%)	± from prev.
Labour	**Claude Moraes** (1) **Mary Honeyball** (3) **Lucy Anderson** (5) **Seb Dance** (7) Ivana Bartoletti, Kamaljeet Jandu, Sanchia Alasia, Andrea Biondi	806,959 (201,739.75)	36.67	+15.4
Conservative	**Syed Kamall** (2) **Charles Tannock** (6) Marina Yannakoudakis, Caroline Attfield, Lynne Hack, Sheila Lawlor, Glyn Chambers, Annesley Abercorn	495,639 (247,819.5)	22.52	−4.8
UKIP	**Gerard Batten** (4) Paul Oakley, Elizabeth Jones, Lawrence Webb, Alastair McFarlane, Andrew McNeilis, Anthony Brown, Peter Whittle	371,133	16.87	+6.1
Green	**Jean Lambert** (8) Caroline Allen, Haroon Saad, Shahrar Ali, Danny Bates, Tracey Hague, Violeta Vajda, Amelia Womack	196,419	8.93	−2.0
Liberal Democrats	Sarah Ludford, Jonathan Fryer, Richard Davis, Anuja Prashar, Rosina Robson, Turhan Ozen, Simon James, Matt McLaren	148,013	6.73	−7.0
4 Freedoms Party	Dirk Hazell, NoelleAnne O'Sullivan, Geoff Gibas, Aline Doussin, Andrew Bell, Deborah Phillips, Royston Flude, Brendan Donnelly	28,014	1.27	New
An Independence from Europe	Patrick Burns, Marlene Daniel, Gareth Griffiths, Munpreet Bhathal, Sharon Greenfield, Eddie Yeoman, Fred Atkins, Jean Atkins	26,675	1.21	New
CPA	Sid Cordle, Yemi Awolola, Ashley Dickenson, Sharmilla Swarma, Laurence Williams, Ethel Odiete, Kevin Nicholls, Steven Hammond	23,702	1.08	−1.9
NHA	Louise Irvine, Chidi Ejimofo, Marcus Chown, Kathryn Anderson, Rufus Hound, Jessica Ormerod, Andrew Sharp, Alex Ashman	23,253	1.06	New
Animal Welfare	Vanessa Hudson, Alexander Bourke, Kirsteen Williamson-Guinn, Andrew Knight, Dimple Patel, Meg Mathews, Guy Dessoy, Ranjan Joshi	21,092	0.96	New
BNP	Stephen Squire, Donna Treanor, Paul Sturdy, John Clarke, David Furness, Cliff le May, Ray Underwood, Kevin Lazell	19,246	0.87	−4.1
Europeans Party	Tommy Tomescu, Andrzej Rygielski, Vanessa Del Carmen Guerrero Rodriguez, Robin Ashenden, Emil Rusanov, Georgios Papagrigorakis	10,712	0.5	New
English Democrat	Jenny Knight, Matthew Roberts, Maggi Young, Graham Clipperton, Gary Butler, Nick Capp, Louise Dutton, Natalie Smith	10,142	0.5	−0.9
Communities United	Kamran Malik, Humera Kamran, Cydatty Bogie, Mary Coleman Daniels, Idris Aden Ali, Reuben Edokpayi, Sunita Kaur Singh, Joanne Flanders	6,951	0.3	New
National Liberal	Graham Williamson, Jagdeesh Singh, Sockalingam Yogalingam, Doris Jones, Upkar Singh Rai, Yuseef Anwar, Araz Yurdseven, Bernard Dube	6,736	0.3	New
NO2EU	Edward Dempsey, Alexander Gordon, April Ashley, Annie Ngemi, Mary Davis, Paula Mitchell, Natasha Horau, Michael Clarty	3,804	0.2	New
Harmony Party	David Vincent	1,985	0.1	−0.84
Turnout		2,200,475		

=== 2009 ===
2009 results

European Election 2009: London
List	Candidates	Votes	Of total (%)	± from prev.
Conservative	**Charles Tannock** (1) **Syed Kamall** (4) **Marina Yannakoudakis** (8) Jean-Paul Floru, Warwick Lightfoot, Bob Seeley, Graham Postles, Alison Sproule	479,037 (159,679)	27.4	+0.6
Labour	**Claude Moraes** (2) **Mary Honeyball** (7) Anne Fairweather, Kevin McGrath, Emma Jones, Raj Jethwa, Nilgun Canver	372,590 (186,295)	21.3	−3.5
Liberal Democrats	**Sarah Ludford** (3) ' Jonathan Fryer, Dinti Batstone, Christopher Le Breton, John Pindar, Simon James, Caroline Persson, Ben Jones	240,156	13.7	−1.6
Green	**Jean Lambert** (5) Ute Michel, Shahrar Ali, Joseph Healy, Miranda Dunn, Shasha Khan, George Graham, Priya Shah	190,589	10.9	+2.5
UKIP	**Gerard Batten** (6) Ralph Atkinson, Michael Zuckerman, Tim Worstall, Sunita Webb, Victor Webb, Strachan McDonald, Geoff Howard, Marcus Watney	188,440	10.8	−1.5
BNP	Bob Bailey, Michael Barnbrook, Dennis Pearce, Julian Leppert, Roberta Woods, Chris Forster, John Clarke, John Evans	86,420	4.9	+0.9
Christian	George Hargreaves, Susan May, Paula Warren, Stephen Hammond, Mary Boyle, Suzanne Fernandez, Peter Ljubisic, David Williams	51,336	2.9	New
Independent	Jan Jananayagam	50,014	2.9	New
English Democrat	Roger Cooper, Graham Dare, Satvinder Singh Chagger, Graham Wood, Arvind Tailor, Elaine Cheeseman, David Stevens, Janus Polenceus	24,477	1.4	+0.5
NO2EU	Bob Crow, John Hendry, Mary Davis, Kevin Nolan, Syed Islam, Onay Kasab, John Rowe, Nick Wrack	17,758	1.0	New
Socialist Labour	Arthur Scargill, Amanda Rose, Colin Muir, Linda Muir, Ronald Sinclair, Margaret Sharkey, Alan Jones, Carole Whatham	15,306	0.9	New
Libertas	Max Burt, Victoria Wood, Susannah Prins, Peter Lloyd, Herbert Crossman, Dominique Field	8,444	0.4	New
Jury Team	Reza Tabrisi, Evan Milner, Lucy O'Sullivan-McCormick, Afshin Payravi, Thomas Mulcahy, Sherif Malak, David Littlejohn, Gregory Williams	7,284	0.4	New
Independent	Steven Cheung	4,918	0.3	New
Socialist (GB)	Danny Lambert, Tristan Miller, Janet Carter, Bill Martin, Adam Buick, Simon Wigley, Frederick Allen, Patricia Deutz	4,050	0.2	New
Yes2Europe	Brendan Donnelly	3,384	0.2	New
Independent	Sohale Rahman	3,248	0.2	New
Independent	Gene Alcantara	1,972	0.1	New
Independent	Haroon Saad	1,603	0.1	New
Turnout		1,751,026	33.3	−4.0

=== 2004 ===
2004 results

European Election 2004: London
List	Candidates	Votes	Of total (%)	± from prev.
Conservative	**Theresa Villiers** (1) **John Bowis** (4) **Charles Tannock** (7) Syed Kamall, Ian Twinn, Roseanne Serrelli, Heather Leigh Mendelsohn, Ashok Kumaar	504,941 (168,313.67)	26.8	−5.9
Labour	**Claude Moraes** (2) **Mary Honeyball** (5) **Robert Evans** (9) Anita Pollack, Hugh Malyan, Steph Elsy, Munir Malik, Jane Briginshaw, Jo Ejiofor	466,584 (155,528)	24.8	−10.2
Liberal Democrats	**Sarah Ludford** (3) Jonathan Fryer, John Stevens, Dinti Wakefield, Ian McDonald, Kishwer Falkner, Nigel Bakhai, Keith Moffitt, Sandra Lawman	288,790	15.3	+3.6
UKIP	**Gerard Batten** (6) Damian Hockney, Christopher Pratt, John De Roeck, Anthony Scholefield, Janice Cronin, Kathleen Garner, Harun Khan, Ralph Atkinson	232,633	12.3	+6.9
Green	**Jean Lambert** (8) Paul Ingram, Judy Maciejowska, Timothy Turner, Christopher Cotton, Douglas Earl, Shahrar Ali, Peter Budge, Joseph Healy	158,986	8.4	+0.7
Respect	George Galloway, Unjum Mirza, Elaine Graham-Leigh, Paul Foot, Rita Carter, John Mulrenan, Victoria Brittain, Gary McFarlane, Ken Loach	91,175	4.8	New
BNP	Christopher Roberts, Tess Culnane, Lee Barnes, James Seadon, John Bowles, Jay Lee, John Evans, Alan Bailey, Lawrence Rustem	76,152	4.0	+2.4
CPA	Michael Elmer, Genevieve Hibbs, Peter Flower, Keith McLeod, Debra Smith-Gorick, Douglas Gibbons, Roger Glencross, Glenton Downs	45,038	2.4	New
English Democrat	Robin Tilbrook, Timothy Bragg, Terence Brown, Robert Howells, Alan Sutton, Robert Poulton	15,945	0.9	New
People's Party for Better Government	Christopher Prior	5,205	0.3	New
Turnout		1,885,449	37.3	+14.2

=== 1999 ===
1999 results

European Election 1999: London
List	Candidates	Votes	Of total (%)	± from prev.
Labour	**Pauline Green** (1) **Claude Moraes** (3) **Robert Evans** (5) **Richard Balfe** (8) Carole Tongue, Shaun Spiers, Mary Honeyball, Munir Malik, Pam Wharfe, Michael Elliott	399,466 (99,866.5)	35.0	
Conservative	**Theresa Villiers** (2) **Charles Tannock** (4) **Lord Bethell** (7) **John Bowis** (9) Ian Twinn, Andrew Popat, Andrew Boff, Bene't Steinberg, John Flack, Angela Harvey	372,989 (93,247.25)	32.7	
Liberal Democrats	**Sarah Ludford** (6) Hugh Dykes, Susan Kramer, Jonathan Fryer, Hilary Leighter, Nick Pinfield, Sue Doughty, Andrew Wiseman, Nikki Thomson, Peter Facey	133,058	11.7	
Green	**Jean Lambert** (10) Niki Kortvelyessy, Jenny Jones, Shane Collins, John William Bradley, Vicky Olliver, Hils Jago, Jayne Forbes, Dean Walton, Michael Stimson	87,545	7.7	
UKIP	Craig Mackinlay, Damian Hockney, Josie O'Ware, Gerald Roberts, Chris Pratt, James Carver, Michael Harvey, Tony Scholefield, John de Roeck, Mark Lester	61,741	5.4	
Socialist Labour	Arthur Scargill, Novjot Brar, Hardy Singh Dhillon, Amanda Rose, John Hendy, Harpal Brar, Eloisa Rule, Robert Siggins, John Hayball, Joe Marino	19,632	1.7	
BNP	John Tyndall, Kenneth Francis, Paul Borg, Michael Davidson, Valerie Tyndall, Jean Griffin, Ruth Tagg, Michael Carey, Christopher Jury, Mark Tointan	17,960	1.6	
Liberal	Maria Williamson, Mark Austin, Robin Almond, Rif Winfield, Anne Bradshaw, Roger Jenking, Gerald Williams, Donald Bruce, Peter White, Jennifer Roach	16,951	1.5	
Pro-Euro Conservative	Marcelle d'Argy Smith, Harriet Crawley, Catherine Moorhouse, Richard Wassell, Sir Anthony Meyer, Martin Sexton, Mary-Anne Widdicombe, Stephen Haseler, Joanne Ezekiel, Daniel Trup	16,383	1.4	
Architect, Human Rights Peace in Europe	George Hajifanis	4,851	0.4	
Anti-Value added tax	Erol Basarik	2,596	0.2	
Humanist	Jon Swinden, Judith Earley, Tony Robinson, Robert Harris, Simon Peters, Simon Domingo, Joanna Spearman, Anna Louise Swinden, Mammo Muchie, Jennifer Wright	2,586	0.2	
The Hemp Coalition	Gordon Webster	2,358	0.2	
Natural Law	Geoffrey Clements, Richard Johnson, Anthony Hardy, Susan Hamza, Gerard Valente, Judith Thomas, Alexander Hankey, Philomena Quick, Jonathan Hinde, Charles Hueston	2,263	0.2	
Weekly Worker	Anne Murphy, Stanley Kelsey, Marcus Larsen, Peter Mansen, Phillip Kent, Jim Gilbert, Andrew Hanna	846	0.1	
Turnout		1,141,225	23.1	
