= North East London =

North East London may refer to:

- North East London, a sub-region used in the London Plan 2008–2011
- North East (London Assembly constituency)

== See also ==
- London North East (European Parliament constituency)
- London
