= Dinesh Dhamija =

British Indian business entrepreneur and politician (born 1950)

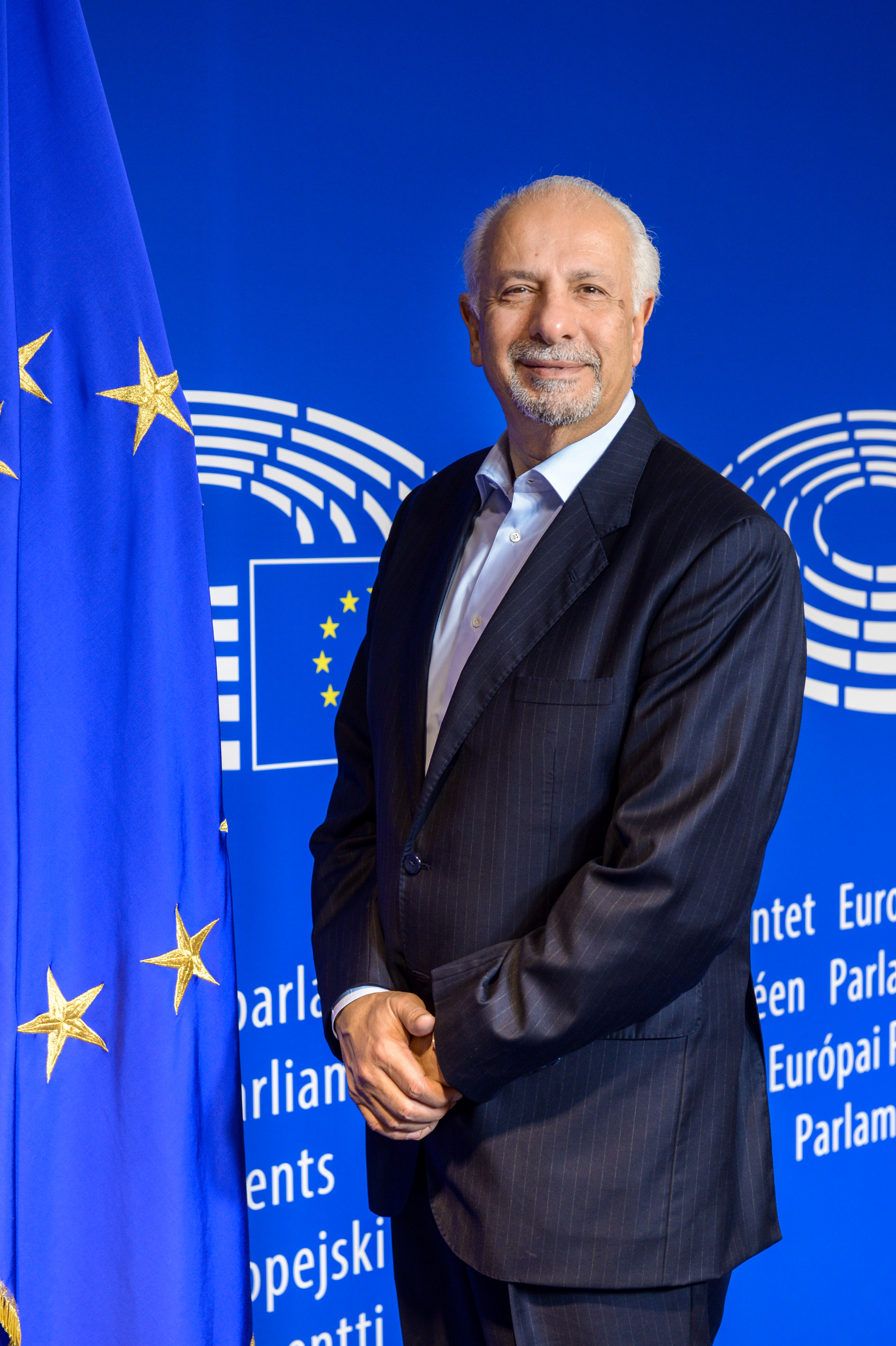
- Dhamija in 2020

Member of the European Parliament for London
- In office 2 July 2019 – 31 January 2020
- Preceded by: Lucy Anderson
- Succeeded by: Constituency abolished

Personal details
- Born: 1950 (age 75–76) Australia
- Party: Liberal Democrats
- Education: Fitzwilliam College, Cambridge

Dinesh Dhamija (born 1950) is a British Indian business entrepreneur and politician. He is best known as the founder of online travel agency Ebookers. He was Member of the European Parliament for the London region serving for the Liberal Democrats. He was elected to the European Parliament in the 2019 elections and held the role until the United Kingdom's withdrawal from the EU.

== Biography ==
Dhamija was born in Australia, the son of an Indian diplomat. He grew up in India, Mauritius, Afghanistan, Czechoslovakia and the Netherlands. He was educated at Mayo College, King's School, Canterbury and Fitzwilliam College, Cambridge, where he attained an MA in law.

He began his professional career working for IBM, but soon left to begin his own business. In 1980, Dinesh and his wife Tani started selling travel tickets from a kiosk at Earl's Court tube station in London. By 1983, the business venture had developed into Flightbookers, a travel agency with three established premises. The firm grew rapidly and, in 1987, was appointed General Sales Agent for Royal Nepal Airlines in the UK and Ireland. Over the next decade, the company became known across Europe and established offices in 12 countries.

In 1996, Dhamija was introduced to the relatively new idea of the Internet. Realising the potential, he began to raise funds for the development of an interactive branch of Flightbookers. In 1999 Ebookers became the first interactive online travel agency in the United Kingdom. Within a few years, the firm had established itself as one of Europe's leading travel agencies. In 2005, Dhamija sold Ebookers for £209m. He is now one of the wealthiest Asian residents in the UK, with an estimated worth of £100m as of 2004.

Dhamija was awarded the 2003 Entrepreneur of the Year award by Management Today. More recently, he was the founder and chairman of the Copper Beech Group, a firm involved in residential property development in Romania and education infrastructure in India.

=== Politics ===
Dhamija joined the Liberal Democrats in 2014. Then party leader Tim Farron asked him to be a business adviser to the party in 2016, and in 2017 he became the party's Deputy Treasurer. In 2018, Dhamija became a vice chair of the Liberal Democrats' Federal Board, and in the same year, he put his name forward for selection as the party's candidate at the 2020 London Mayoral election but lost out to Siobhan Benita.

Dhamija was selected as a candidate for the 2019 European Parliament elections, voted second on the list for London. He took unsuccessful legal action in the High Court against his party to take the top list position, on the basis of being a minority ethnic candidate and Liberal Democrats diversity targets. On 23 May 2019, he was elected as one of three Liberal Democrat Members of the European Parliament for the London region.

Dhamija is a member of the think tank, Bridge India and wrote a blog article for the organisation on the Asia Pacific Trade Deal in April 2023.
