= Luisa Porritt =

British Liberal Democrat politician

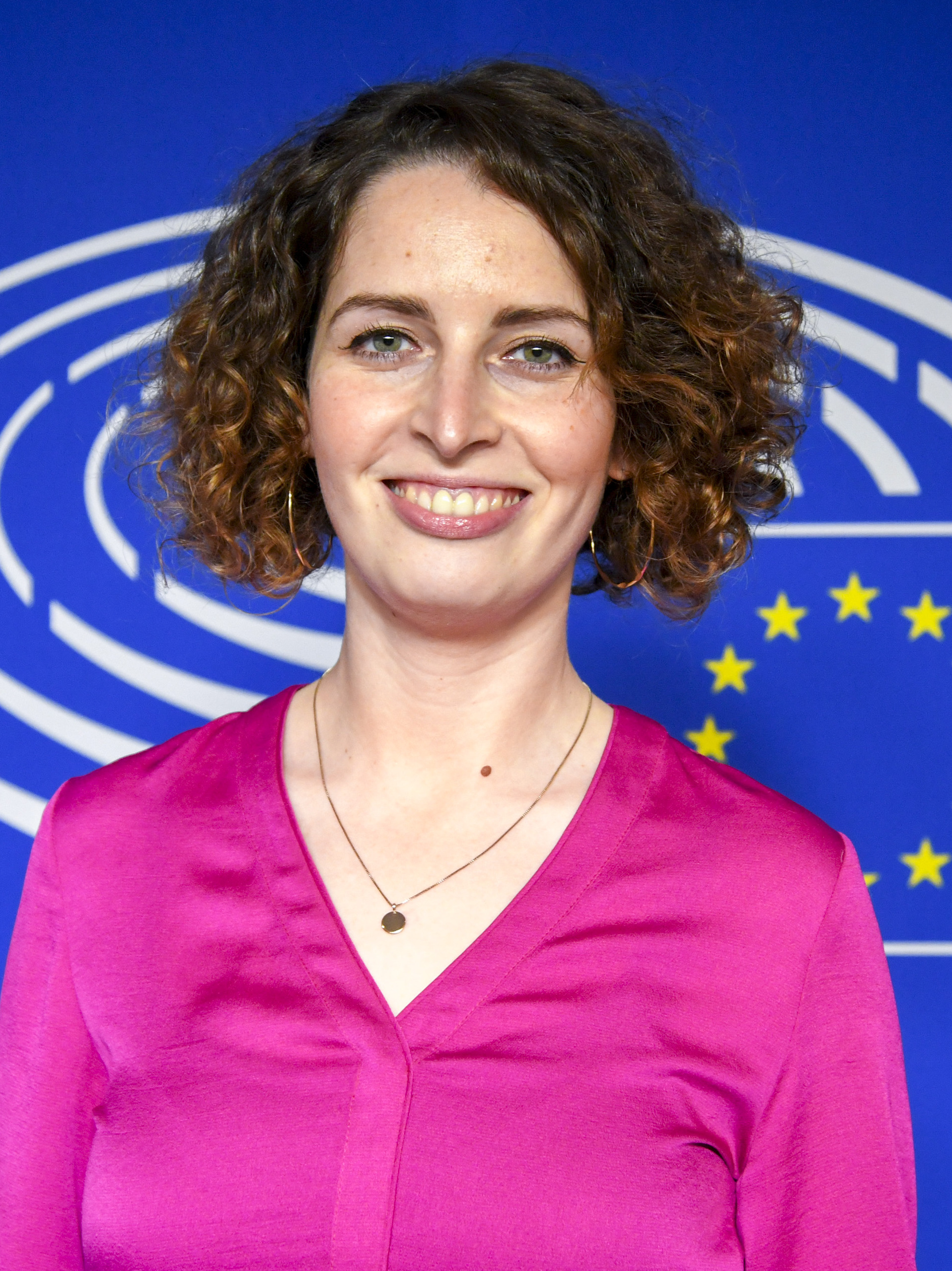
- Porritt in 2020

Member of the European Parliament for London
- In office 2 July 2019 – 31 January 2020
- Preceded by: Mary Honeyball
- Succeeded by: Position abolished

Lib Dem Group Leader on Camden Council
- In office 7 September 2020 – May 2022
- Deputy: Tom Simon
- Preceded by: Flick Rea
- Succeeded by: Tom Simon

Member of Camden London Borough Council for Belsize
- In office 3 May 2018 – 5 May 2022
- Preceded by: Leila Roy
- Succeeded by: Judy Dixey

President of Young Liberals
- Incumbent
- Assumed office 2021

Personal details
- Born: 23 May 1987 (age 39) Royal Free Hospital, London, England
- Party: Liberal Democrats
- Education: Royal Holloway, University of London; Sciences Po Paris

Luisa Manon Porritt (born 23 May 1987) is a British Liberal Democrat politician.

She was elected as a Councillor for Belsize ward in Camden in 2018 and served as the leader of the Liberal Democrats on the council from 2020 to 2022.

She also served as a Member of the European Parliament (MEP) for London from 2019 to 2020. and was the party's candidate for the 2021 London mayoral election where she failed to achieve 5% of the vote and lost her deposit.

== Early life and education ==
Luisa Manon Porritt was born at the Royal Free Hospital in Hampstead on 23 May 1987.

She grew up in Camden and was educated at a local private school. She earned a degree in history from Royal Holloway, University of London in 2008 and went on to complete a Master's degree at Sciences Po Paris.

== Career ==
Before her political career, Porritt worked as a journalist, a consultant for strategic advisory firm Global Counsel, and a political researcher and advisor for Shriti Vadera. In 2021, Porritt became Head of Investment Content at PR firm Edelman Smithfield.

== Political career ==
=== Camden Council ===
Porritt joined the Liberal Democrats a few days after the UK voted to leave the European Union in 2016. She became a Liberal Democrat councillor for the London Borough of Camden in 2018. She gained a seat for the marginal council ward of Belsize from the Conservative incumbent by nine votes, following a recount. She became leader the Liberal Democrat group on Camden Council on 7 September 2020.

Porritt stood down as a Camden councillor at the 2022 Camden London Borough Council election.

She later explained as part of a speech to her party's annual conference that one of the reasons she had been forced to leave Camden was due to the area's high house prices.

=== European Parliament ===
In the 2019 European Parliament election, she was third on the Liberal Democrat list for the London constituency. The Liberal Democrats won 27% of the vote, winning three seats, so Porritt was elected as a Member of the European Parliament. She was appointed deputy leader of the Liberal Democrat group in the European Parliament. During her time as an MEP, Porritt brought resolutions calling on Iran to release Nazanin Zaghari-Ratcliffe.

=== London mayoral candidate ===
Porritt was reported to be "seriously considering" putting her name forward to be the Liberal Democrat candidate in the 2021 London mayoral election after Siobhan Benita withdrew from the race following its postponement from the original May 2020 date. She won the selection against the option to reopen nominations on 13 October 2020 after the only other shortlisted candidate, Geeta Sidhu-Robb, was suspended from the Liberal Democrats following antisemitism.

Porritt called for empty offices to be turned into affordable housing, and reform of stop and search. She has been critical of the government's handling of coronavirus, calling for a circuit breaker lockdown when London was put into Tier 2 restrictions in October 2020, and Sadiq Khan's negotiations on the future of Transport For London.

== Parliamentary aspirations ==
Porritt ran to become the Liberal Democrat candidate for the parliamentary constituency of Sutton and Cheam for the 2024 general election. However, she did not win the selection, losing to Luke Taylor, who went on to win the seat. Porritt did not seek selection for the seat of Hampstead and Highgate in the wake of an arrest warrant being issued for sitting MP Tulip Siddiq.
