= H. Forman and Son =

H. Forman & Son
- Industry: Food
- Founded: 1905
- Founder: Harry (Aaron) Forman
- Headquarters: London, E3; United Kingdom
- Products: Smoked fish, cured fish
- Owner: Lance Forman
- Website: www.formans.co.uk

H. Forman & Son is a salmon smokery located (in a building shaped like a piece of salmon) in Fish Island, London, England run by former Brexit Party MEP and Conservative Party MEP, Lance Forman (birth name: Lance Anisfeld).

== London Cure Smoked Salmon ==
H. Forman & Son produces "London Cure Smoked Salmon", which is protected under the EU Protected Geographical Indication scheme. The application for protected status was submitted by Lance Forman and was supported by then Mayor of London Boris Johnson, who opened the factory in 2009. It is the first London-based food to obtain this EU protected status.

The designation provides protected name status to products under EU law, allowing the London Cure Smoked Salmon to be labelled and protected with an EU trade mark. Forman stated he was "very proud" of the designation, but later dismissed the idea the EU has advanced H. Forman & Son, telling Salmon Business “I can honestly say that having been in the EU hasn’t created any serious commercial advantages for our business".

The London Cure Smoked Salmon has featured on the menus of the dining rooms in the House of Lords and in the House of Commons and has also been sold in Harrods, Selfridges and Fortnum & Mason.

== Public relations ==
Following a lengthy dispute, the site of the business was relocated in 2007 from the area which is now the London Olympic Park as part a compulsory purchase order by the London Development Agency (LDA) involving more than 200 companies for the London 2012 Olympics. The cost of relocation to its current premises - a building shaped like a piece of salmon, with a roof resembling salmon skin - was shared between the company and the LDA.

The business faced threats of a local boycott in the wake of Lance Forman's election as a London MEP for the Brexit Party, a group which won only 6% of votes locally in the May 2019 European Parliament elections. Police investigations were opened in the run-up to the elections after a 10-metre swastika was spray-painted on the side of the business in a suspected anti-semitic attack. Forman claimed that he did not believe his business was targeted due to his Jewish heritage but rather because he supported Brexit.

In November 2019, the business was publicly criticised by the mayors of Tower Hamlets and Hackney for hosting a public meeting of Turning Point UK (the British incarnation of Turning Point USA, a controversial, right-wing, pro-Trump organisation). Lance Forman, owner of the business, who was also on a panel at the meeting, defended the decision saying he was in favour of free speech.

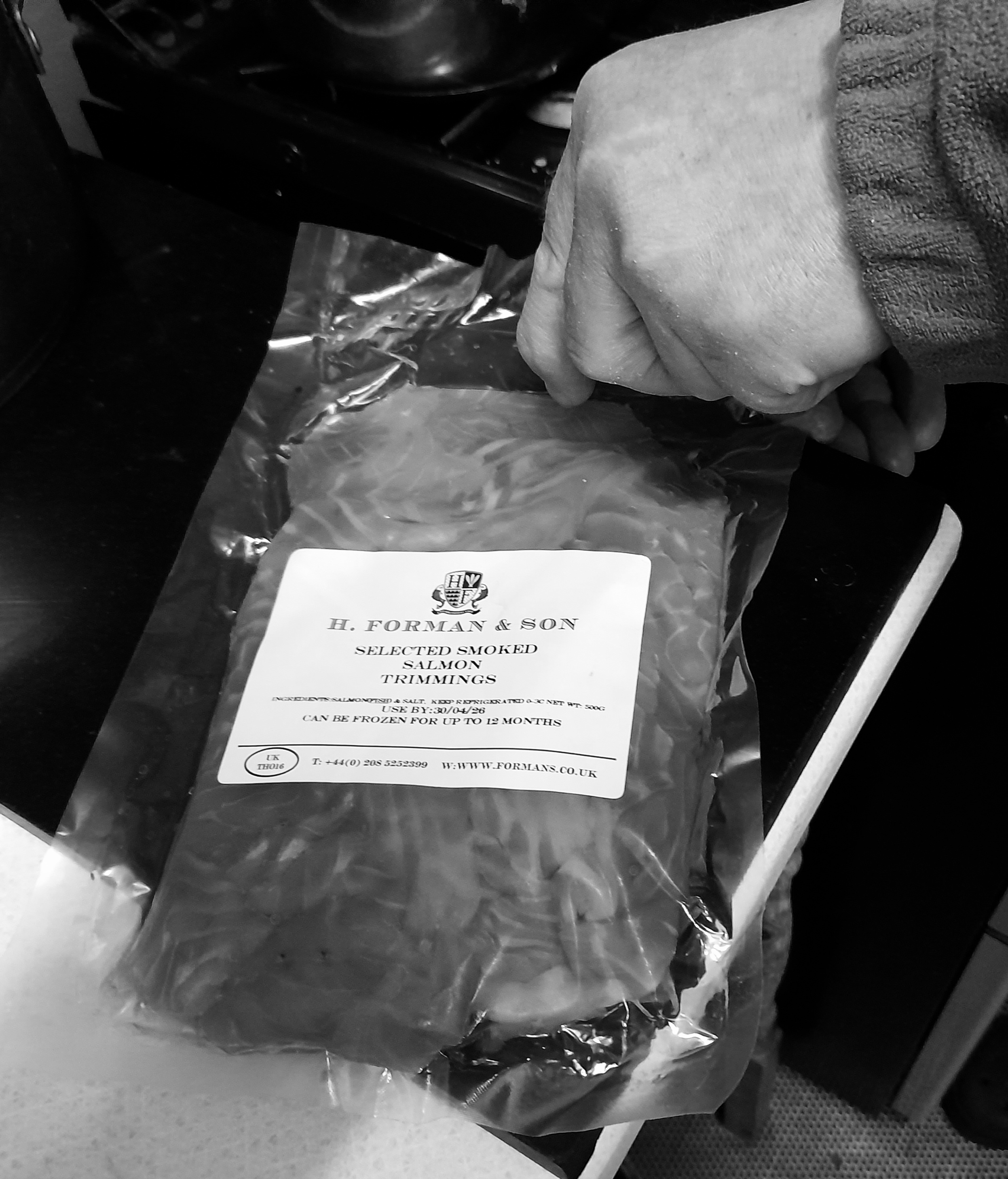
Man in kitchen opens bag of Forman's salmon trimmings.

== FDA rulings ==
The United States Food and Drug Administration (FDA) issued a FDA warning letter to Formans' on 12 May 2020; the FDA accepted the company was in compliance on 29 September 2020.
