= Lance Forman =

British politician (born 1962)

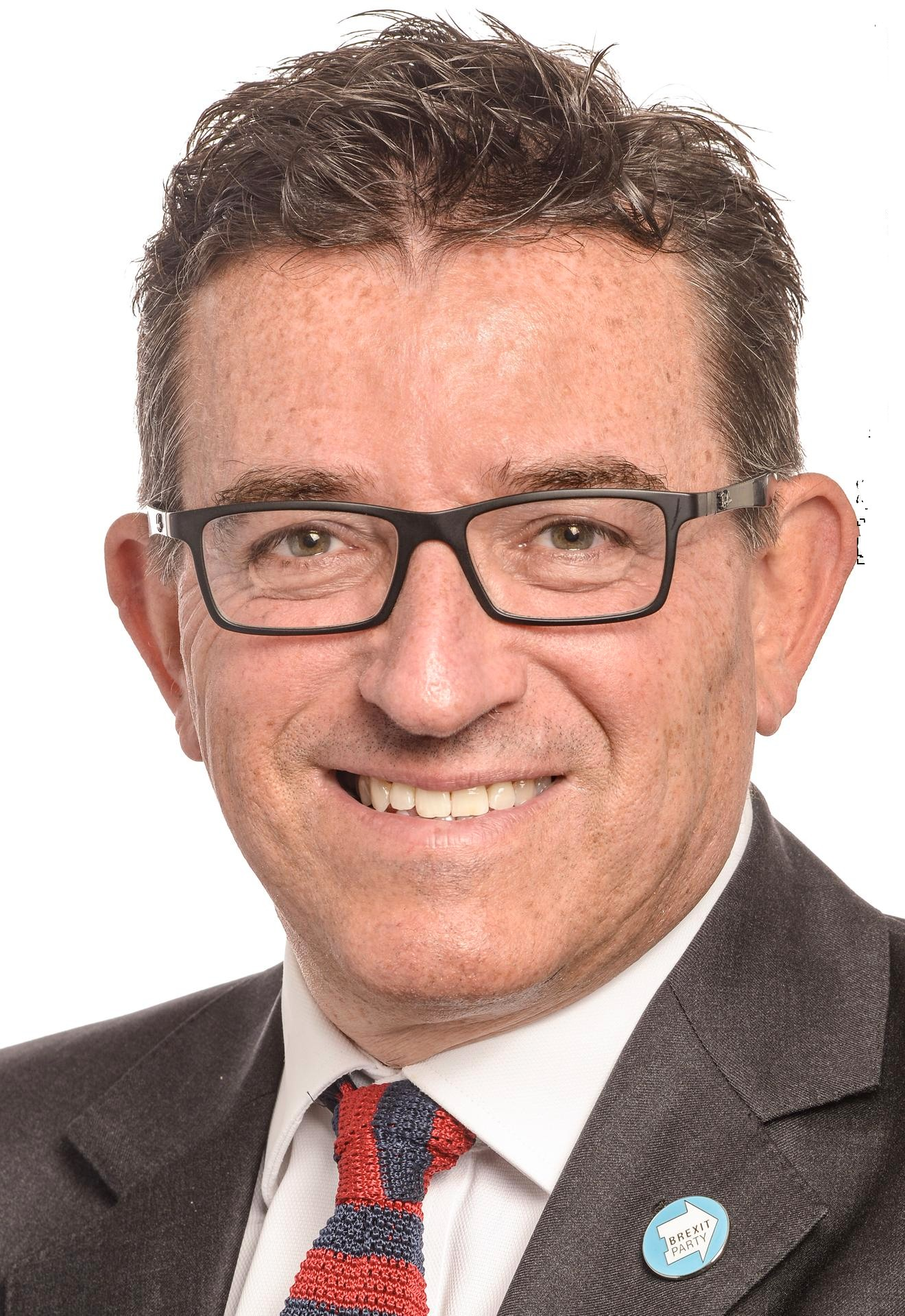
- Forman in 2019

Member of the European Parliament for London
- In office 2 July 2019 – 31 January 2020
- Preceded by: Syed Kamall
- Succeeded by: Constituency abolished

Personal details
- Born: 13 October 1962 (age 63) Islington, London, England
- Party: Conservative (before 2019; since 2020)
- Other political affiliations: Independent (2019–2020); Brexit (2019)
- Spouse: Rene Anisfeld
- Children: 3
- Education: Haberdashers' Aske's Boys' School (1969–80)
- Alma mater: Trinity College, Cambridge

Lance Philip Anisfeld (born 13 October 1962), known professionally as Lance Philip Forman, is a British politician and businessman, who was a Member of the European Parliament (MEP) for London between 2 July 2019 and the United Kingdom's withdrawal from the EU.

Previously affiliated with the Conservative Party, Forman was elected to the European Parliament as a Brexit Party MEP, however he resigned the party whip in December 2019 in order to support the Conservative Party's Brexit strategy. He later joined the Conservative Party and for part of January 2020 was a member of the ECR group.

== Early life ==
Forman was born in Islington and educated at Haberdashers' Aske's Boys' School and Trinity College, Cambridge. In 1985, as Lance Anisfeld, he was President of Cambridge Union.

== Career ==
Forman worked at Price Waterhouse Coopers as an accountant before being employed as a Special Adviser on trade related matters, 1991–92, to Peter Lilley, Secretary of State for Trade and Industry.

He was subsequently a partner of EastS, a small property advisory firm specialising in Eastern Europe. The Observer reported that Forman specialised in the privatisation of enterprises in former eastern European Soviet states and held real estate in Ukraine. Forman told The Observer that he acted "as a consultant" in this regard.

=== H. Forman & Son ===
Forman manages H. Forman and Son, a smoked salmon business in Fish Island, London. He is the fourth-generation owner of the company. The business faced threats of a local boycott in the wake of his election as a London MEP for the Brexit Party, a group which won only 10.1% of votes locally in the May 2019 European Parliament elections. Police investigations were opened in the run-up to the elections after a 10-metre swastika was spray-painted on the side of the business in a suspected anti-semitic attack. Forman has claimed that he does not believe his business was targeted due to his Jewish heritage but rather because he supports Brexit.

Forman successfully applied for the EU’s protected geographical indication (PGI) status for H. Forman and Son's "London cure" smoked salmon. The designation provides protected name status to products under EU law, allowing the London cure to be labelled and protected with an EU trade mark. While acknowledging "The irony" of gaining EU protection due to his eurosceptic views, Forman said he was "very proud", while the prime minister, Theresa May, called the designation "fantastic". In an August 2018 interview for Salmon Business, Forman dismissed the idea that the EU has advanced his business, saying, "I can honestly say that having been in the EU hasn’t created any serious commercial advantages for our business".

== MEP ==
Forman was elected as a Brexit Party MEP for the London constituency in May 2019. He resigned the party whip in December 2019 to support the Conservative Party's Brexit strategy.

Forman is considered to be the most prolific Twitter user of all MEPs, having the highest total number of tweets. A number of Forman's tweets have gone viral such as claims that Jeremy Corbyn is a Nazi, that Islamophobia in the Conservative party is "made up by the left", that the "British taxpayer has paid for a nice fleet" of Mercedes for MEPs in Brussels (while posting a picture of what was actually a Skoda) as well as sharing a video of himself apparently unable to operate the voting machines at the EU parliament, which he claimed was evidence that there was "no democracy here".

Forman is in favour of "reducing the size of the state" and removing "red tape" which he considers harmful to businesses. He has said that EU packaging and hygiene regulations have cost his business hundreds of thousands of pounds annually, which is the principal reason he is in favour of Brexit. This, despite also saying that the USA market's demands are harsher than that of the EU. Forman is a climate change denier.

== Turning Point ==
Forman's son Oliver (Ollie) Anisfeld was formerly the CEO of Turning Point UK, the British branch of Turning Point USA, a conservative, pro-Trump organisation. The organisation was subject to controversy at its launch, after conservative commentator, Candace Owens, was criticised for her remarks stating, the "problem" with Hitler was that "he had dreams outside of Germany." In November 2019, Lance Forman was publicly criticised by the mayors of Tower Hamlets and Hackney for hosting a public meeting of Turning Point UK, in which Forman was also a panel member. Forman defended the decision saying he was in favour of free speech.

== Patronage ==
Together with his wife, Rene Anisfeld, Forman was a patron of the charitable organisation, One Family UK, which aided victims of terror attacks in Israel.

== Publications ==
- Forman's Games: The Dark Underside of the London Olympics (Biteback Publishing, 12 July 2016) ISBN 9781785901249
