= Lucy Anderson (politician) =

British politician (born 1965)

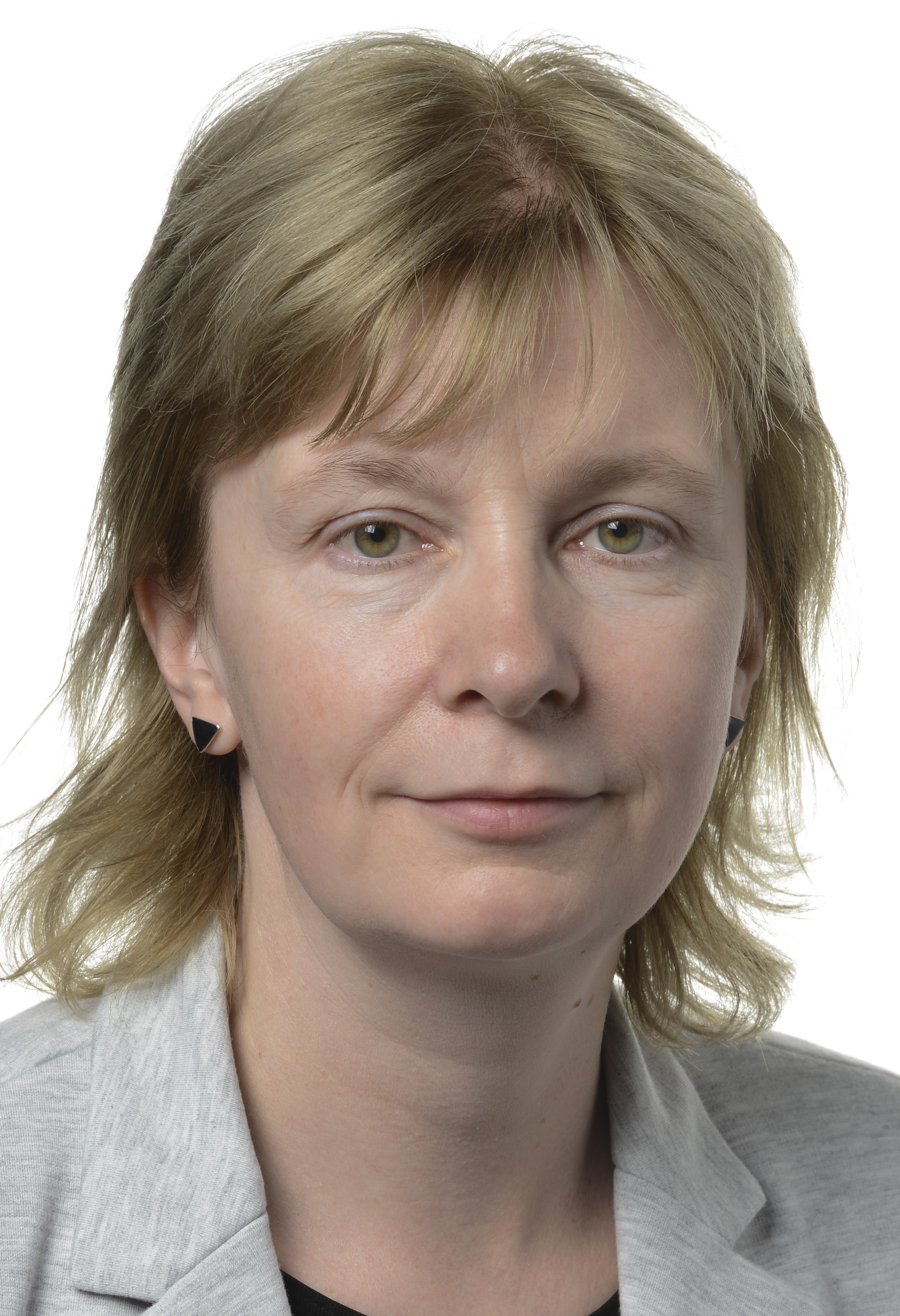
- Official portrait, 2014

Member of the European Parliament for London
- In office 22 May 2014 – 1 July 2019
- Preceded by: Marina Yannakoudakis
- Succeeded by: Dinesh Dhamija

Camden Borough Councillor for Kentish Town Ward
- In office 2 May 2002 – 7 December 2006
- Preceded by: Constituency Created
- Succeeded by: Ralph Scott

Personal details
- Party: Labour
- Website: Official website europarl...LUCY ANDERSON

Lucy Anderson is a former Member of the European Parliament for the London region for the Labour Party. She was elected in 2014, and stood down in 2019.

== Political career ==
Anderson was the Councillor for Kentish Town on Camden Borough Council from 2002 – 2006 and following this she worked for the Greater London Authority and the National Union of Teachers.

Anderson supported Jeremy Corbyn during the 2015 Labour leadership election.

== Professional career ==
Anderson is a lawyer with expertise in the areas of employment rights and equality law, transport and health.

European Parliament
Preceded by Marina Yannakoudakis	Member of the European Parliament for London; 2014–2019	Succeeded by Dinesh Dhamija
