= London North East (European Parliament constituency) =

Former European Parliament constituency

- European Parliament constituency
- Boundary within London (1979-1984)
- Member state: United Kingdom
- Created: 1979
- Dissolved: 1999
- MEPs: 1

London North East was a constituency of the European Parliament from 1979 to 1999. Prior to its uniform adoption of proportional representation in 1999, the United Kingdom used first-past-the-post for the European elections in England, Scotland and Wales. The European Parliament constituencies used under that system were smaller than the later regional constituencies and only had one Member of the European Parliament each.

Boundary within South East England and London (1984-1994)

Boundary within South East England and London (1994-1999)

== Boundaries ==
1979-1984: Bethnal Green and Bow; Chingford; Hackney Central; Hackney North and Stoke Newington; Hackney South and Shoreditch; Leyton; Newham North West; Newham South; Stepney and Poplar; Walthamstow.

1984-1999: Bethnal Green and Stepney; Bow and Poplar; Chingford; Hackney North and Stoke Newington; Hackney South and Shoreditch; Leyton; Newham North West; Newham South; Walthamstow.

== Members of the European Parliament ==
Elected	Members	Party
1979	Alf Lomas	Labour
1984	Alf Lomas	Labour
1989	Alf Lomas	Labour
1994	Alf Lomas	Labour
1999	Constituency abolished: see London	

== Election results ==
European Parliament election, 1979: London North East
Party	Candidate	Votes	%	±%
Labour	Alf Lomas	61,004	57.5	N/A
Conservative	C. St. G. C. Stanbrook	36,200	34.1	N/A
Liberal	R. P. Bancroft	8,839	8.3	N/A
Majority		24,804	23.4	N/A
Turnout		106,043	20.4	N/A
Labour win (new seat)				

European Parliament election, 1984: London North East
Party	Candidate	Votes	%	±%
Labour	Alf Lomas	79,907	61.8	▲4.3
Conservative	Mark A. L. Batchelor	27,242	21.1	▼13.1
Liberal	James P. Heppell	17,344	13.4	▲5.1
Ecology	Jean Lambert	4,797	3.7	N/A
Majority		52,665	40.7	▲17.3
Turnout		129,290	25.2	▲4.8
Labour hold		Swing	▲8.7	

European Parliament election, 1989: London North East
Party	Candidate	Votes	%	±%
Labour	Alf Lomas	76,085	53.9	▼7.9
Conservative	Michael Trend	28,318	20.1	▼1.0
Green	Jean Lambert	25,949	18.4	▲14.7
SLD	Simon G. Banks	9,575	6.8	▼6.6
Communist	Nina Temple	1,129	0.8	N/A
Majority		47,767	33.9	▼6.9
Turnout		141,056	27.6	▲2.4
Labour hold		Swing	▼3.4	

European Parliament election, 1994: London North East
Party	Candidate	Votes	%	±%
Labour	Alf Lomas	80,256	62.1	▲8.1
Conservative	Simon J. M. Gordon	23,171	17.9	▼2.2
Liberal Democrats	Kofi Bakoki Appiah	10,242	7.9	▲1.1
Green	Jean Lambert	8,386	6.5	▼11.9
Liberal	Erbie Murat	2,573	2.0	N/A
UKIP	Peter Compobassi	2,015	1.5	N/A
Natural Law	Richard Archer	1,111	0.9	N/A
Communist	Mark W. Fischer	869	0.7	▼0.1
International Communist	Antony Hyland	679	0.5	N/A
Majority		57,085	44.1	▲10.3
Turnout		129,302	26.6	▼1.0
Labour hold		Swing	▲5.1	
