= Syed Kamall =

British politician (born 1967)

The Right Honourable The Lord Kamall
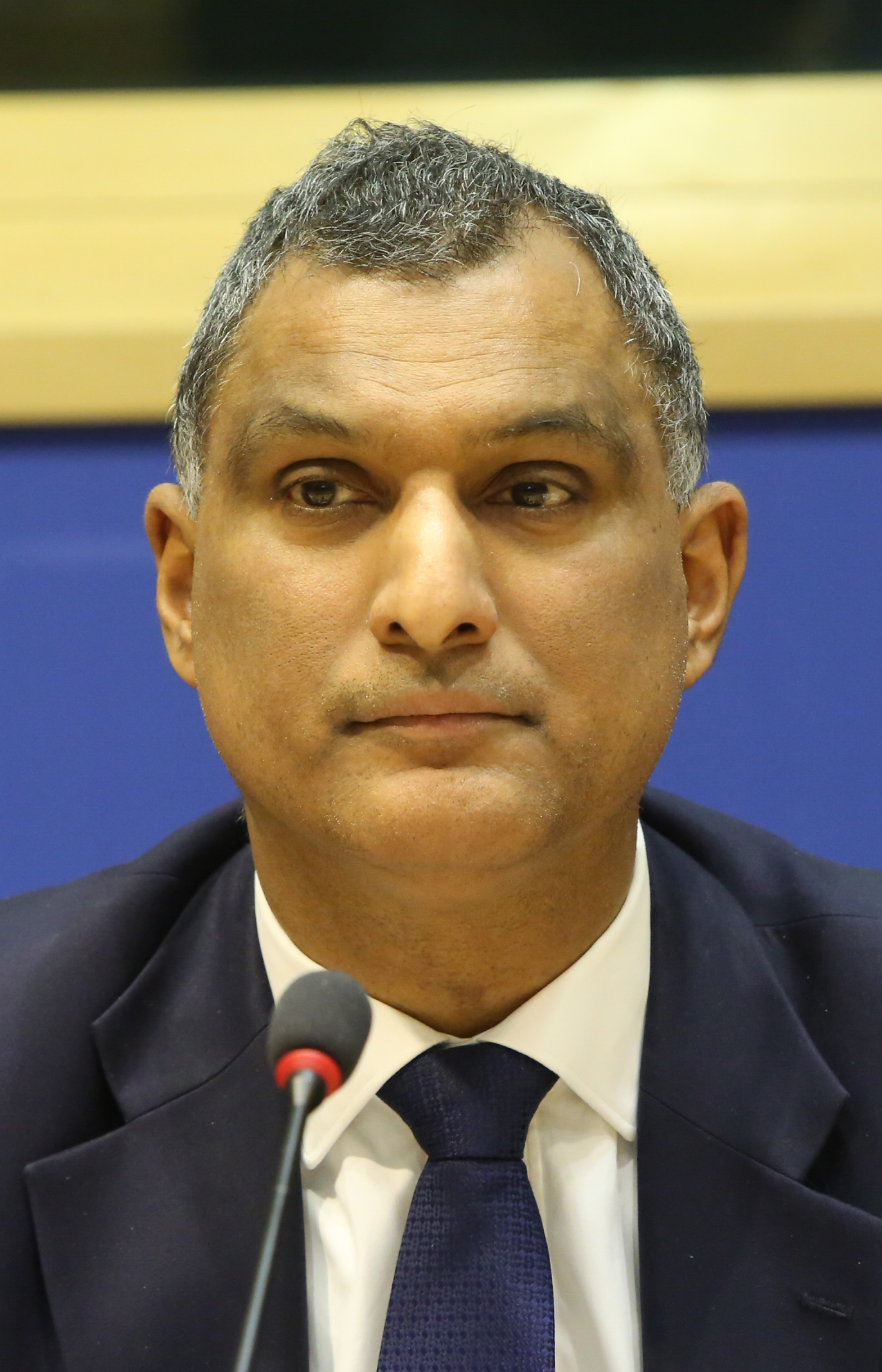
- Kamall in 2019

Shadow Minister for Health and Social Care
- Incumbent
- Assumed office 1 September 2024
- Leader: Rishi Sunak; Kemi Badenoch
- Preceded by: The Baroness Merron

Parliamentary Under-Secretary of State for Civil Society, Heritage, Tourism and Growth
- In office 20 September 2022 – 29 October 2022 Serving with Dr Caroline Johnson
- Prime Minister: Liz Truss
- Preceded by: The Baroness Barran (Note: Office vacant since 2021.)

Parliamentary Under-Secretary of State for Technology, Innovation and Life Sciences
- In office 17 September 2021 – 20 September 2022
- Prime Minister: Boris Johnson
- Preceded by: The Lord Bethell
- Succeeded by: The Lord Markham

Co-chair of the European Conservatives and Reformists
- In office 12 June 2014 – 1 July 2019
- Preceded by: Martin Callanan
- Succeeded by: Raffaele Fitto

Leader of the Conservatives in the European Parliament
- In office 19 November 2013 – 25 November 2014
- Preceded by: Richard Ashworth
- Succeeded by: Ashley Fox
Parliamentary offices
Member of the House of Lords
Lord Temporal
Life peerage 28 January 2021
Member of the European Parliament for London
In office 5 May 2005 – 1 July 2019
Preceded by	Theresa Villiers
Succeeded by	Lance Forman

Personal details
- Born: Syed Salah Kamall; 15 February 1967 (age 59) Hornsey, London, England
- Party: Conservative
- Spouse: Sandira Beekoo (m. 1997)
- Education: The Latymer School
- Alma mater: University of Liverpool (BEng); London School of Economics (MSc); City University, London (PhD)
- Occupation: Politician; academic
- Website: Official website Parliamentary website

Syed Salah Kamall, Baron Kamall (born 15 February 1967) is a British politician and academic, who from September to October 2022 served in HM Government as Parliamentary Under-Secretary of State at the Department for Digital, Culture, Media and Sport. He was previously Parliamentary Under-Secretary of State for Innovation at the Department of Health and Social Care (2021–22).

Professor of Politics and International Relations at St Mary's University, Twickenham, Lord Kamall is also the academic and research director at the Institute of Economic Affairs, a classical liberal think tank based in London.

Kamall represented London as a Member of the European Parliament for the Conservative Party from 2005 to 2019, serving on the International Trade and Economic and Monetary Affairs Committees. From 2013 to 2014, Kamall served as Leader of the Conservatives in the European Parliament, then as Leader of the European Conservatives and Reformists, from June 2014 till 2019.

In December 2020, he was nominated by Prime Minister Boris Johnson as a Life Peer (cr. 28 Jan 2021).

== Biography ==
Kamall was born in Hornsey and brought up in Edmonton, London. He is a Muslim, and of Indo-Guyanese descent; his father migrated to London from Guyana in the 1950s.

Educated at the Latymer School in Edmonton, he then graduated from the University of Liverpool as BEng, before receiving an MSc degree from the London School of Economics and later a PhD from City University, London.

== Early career ==
Kamall started his career as a business systems analyst for NatWest Overseas Department (1989–91). He was a Management Fellow, University of Bath School of Management (1994–96), Management Research Fellow, Leeds University Business School (1996–97), Associate Director/Consultant, Omega Partners (1997–2001), and a Consultant at SSK Consulting (2001–05). He was elected a Visiting Fellow of Leeds University Business School in 2004 where he lectured MBA students on international business and strategy, and supervised doctoral students' research.

Before entering the European Parliament, Kamall worked as a consultant to companies on marketing, strategy and public affairs. In 2003, he started a diversity recruitment business. He is a co-founder of the Global Business Research Institute (GBRI), an educational body conducting outreach to business executives, journalists and civil servants, promoting a greater understanding of globalisation and its consequences.

== Political career ==
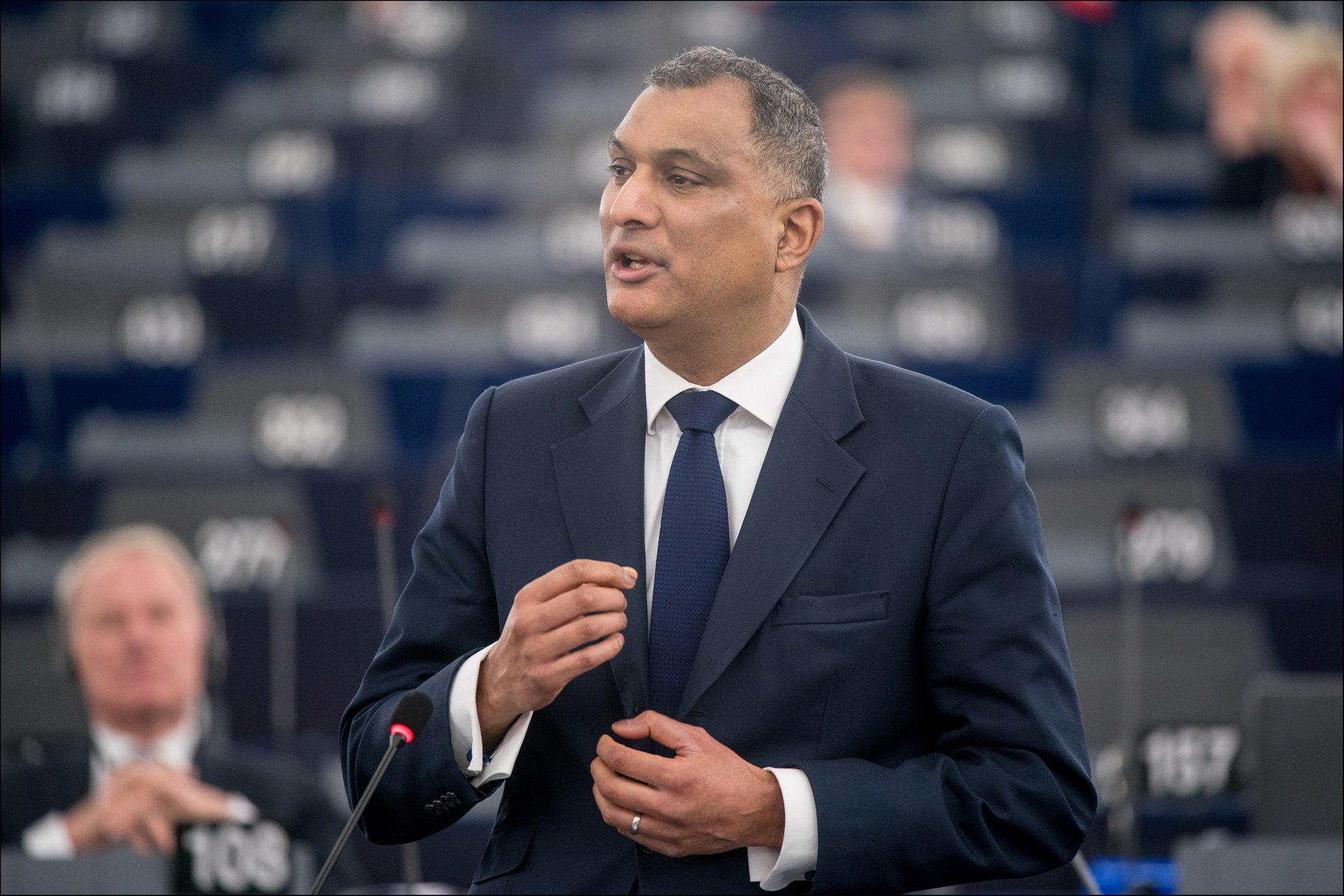
Kamall speaking in 2019

Kamall has been a member of the Conservatives since 1987 and has held various positions in the party since then: Chairman, Stockwell Ward, Vauxhall Conservative Association; Hon. Secretary, Bath Conservative Association CPC; Chairman, Eccleston Ward, and Chairman, Eccleston/Churchill CPC, Cities of London and Westminster Conservative Association; Executive Member, London Eastern Area Committee.

In May 2000, Kamall was a Conservative Candidate for the London Assembly. The following year, he was Conservative candidate for West Ham in the June 2001 General Election. He was placed fourth on the Conservative list in London for the 2004 European Parliament elections. The Conservatives won three seats and Kamall became a Member of the European Parliament in May 2005, after Theresa Villiers stepped down on being elected as an MP to the UK Parliament. In the European Parliament, he served on the Economic and Monetary Affairs, Legal Affairs and International Trade committees.

Kamall was placed on the "A-list" of Conservative parliamentary candidates ahead of the 2010 election and was again returned to Brussels in 2014 representing London as an MEP.

He is also a contributor to the free market public policy think tank The Cobden Centre, one of Europe's pre-eminent think tanks based around the Austrian School of economics.

In 2016, Kamall backed voting to leave the European Union in the run up to the Brexit referendum.

In October 2018, during a debate in which Udo Bullmann, the German leader of the Socialists and Democrats Group linked the political right to extremism, Kamall responded by saying that Nazis were National Socialists who followed left wing policies. There was an angry reaction from the Left and he apologised for any offence caused. However, he was angered himself when Udo Bullmann, issued a press release which falsely accused Kamall of calling the S&D Nazis.

In the 2019 European Parliament election, Syed Kamall lost his European Parliamentary seat.

Prime Minister Boris Johnson then nominated him as a Life Peer in December 2020, as announced in the 2020 Political Honours list. On 28 January 2021, he was created Baron Kamall, of Edmonton in the London Borough of Enfield, being introduced to the House of Lords the following month.

On 17 September 2021, Lord Kamall was appointed Parliamentary Under-Secretary of State for Innovation at the Department for Health and Social Care, in the second Cabinet reshuffle of the second Johnson ministry.

He was chosen to present the Royal Armills to the King at the 2023 Coronation.

== Publications ==
In 1996, Kamall wrote a book on EU telecommunications policy, and has written on multinational business and telecommunications policy for such books as Management in China: The Experience of Foreign Businesses; Trade and Investment in China: The European Experience; Political and Economic Relations Between Asia and Europe: New Challenges in Economics and Management, and in such journals as Management International Review and Transnational Corporations.

== Personal life ==
Kamall follows Islam, and, in 1997, married Sandira Bye Beekoo, a fellow Conservative.

After leaving the European Parliament, Syed Kamall became the Academic and Research Director at the Institute of Economic Affairs and Professor of International Relations and Politics at St Mary's University, Twickenham.

A keen player of the bass guitar, Kamall sang in a blues band called "Exiled in Brussels", with Latvian MEP Roberts Zīle.

== See also ==
- List of members of the European Parliament for the United Kingdom (2004–2009)
- List of members of the European Parliament for the United Kingdom (2009–2014)
- House of Lords
- Department for Culture, Media and Sport

== Notes ==
European Parliament
Preceded by Theresa Villiers	Member of the European Parliament for London; 2005–2019	
Party political offices
Preceded by Richard Ashworth	Leader of the Conservative Party in the European Parliament; 2013–2014	Succeeded by Ashley Fox
Preceded by Martin Callanan	Chair of the European Conservatives and Reformists; 2014–2019	
Orders of precedence in the United Kingdom
Preceded by The Lord Cruddas	Gentlemen; Baron Kamall	Succeeded by The Lord Parker of Minsmere
