= Jonathan Fryer =

British politician (1950–2021)

Jonathan Harold Fryer
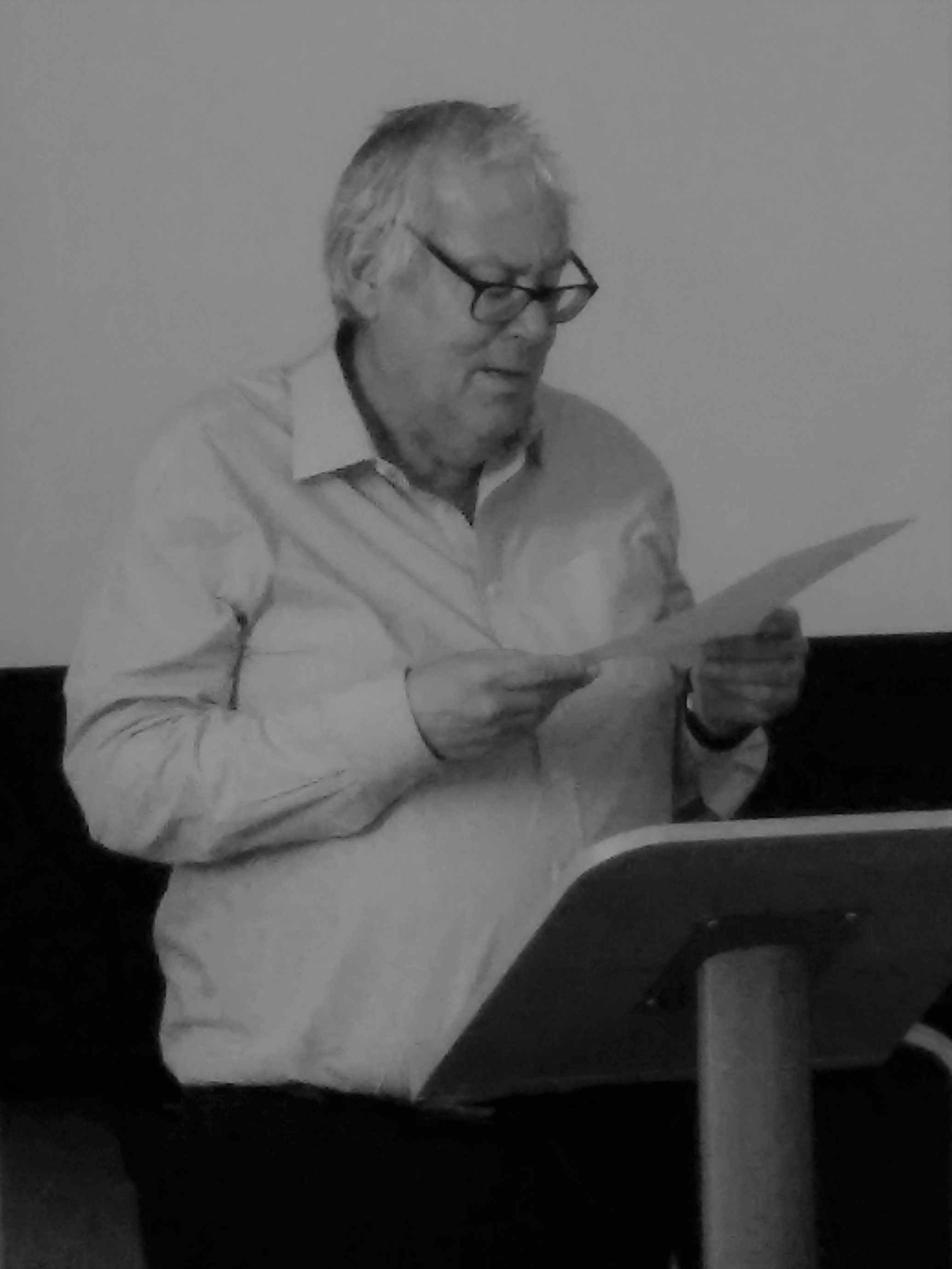
- Fryer in 2018

Chairman, London Liberal Democrats

Personal details
- Born: 5 June 1950 Manchester, England
- Died: 16 April 2021 (aged 70)
- Party: Liberal Democrats
- Education: Manchester Grammar School; St Edmund Hall, Oxford
- Profession: Politician, writer

Jonathan Harold Fryer (born Graham Leslie Morton; 5 June 1950 – 16 April 2021) was a British writer, broadcaster, lecturer and Liberal Democrat politician. His biographies of Oscar Wilde and Christopher Isherwood were the best-known of his fifteen books.

He was the candidate for the Liberal Party, or its successor, the Liberal Democrats, for various seats in Greater London in five UK General Elections. He was also a candidate for the parties for a seat in the London area in every election for the European Parliament held in the UK, except for that held in 1989. As Chairman of the London Liberal Democrats, he supervised the headquarters' move to Brixton and streamlined its operations.

== Early life ==
Fryer was born in Manchester on 5 June 1950, under the name Graham Leslie Morton. Following the divorce of his natural mother, he was adopted as an infant by a local businessman and his wife, who later spent much of their time in South Africa. He had two natural sisters and one adopted one.

== Education ==
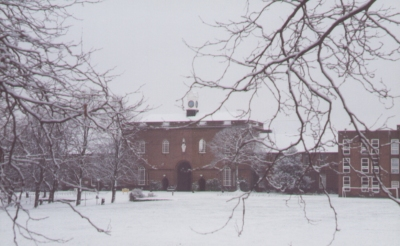
The Manchester Grammar School

After private primary education at Branwood School, Eccles, Fryer obtained a place at the independent Manchester Grammar School. He spent the summer of 1967 in Tours, at the Institut de Touraine, perfecting his French. He left school before the end of his final year (having acquired 'A' levels in English Literature, French and Geography) and travelled overland to Vietnam, where he reported on the war for the Manchester Evening News and the Geographical Magazine. His overland journey back to England in September 1969 gave him his first introduction to the Middle East, which remained an abiding interest.

Fryer had won an Open Exhibition award to St Edmund Hall, Oxford, where he started to read Geography, before switching to Oriental Studies (Chinese with Japanese). He returned to the Far East for a year in 1971–1972, studying part-time at the University of Hong Kong and in Tokyo.

== Career ==
Fryer joined Reuters news agency as a graduate trainee after university, serving for just over a year in London and Brussels. On receiving his first book contract (for The Great Wall of China) he went freelance, but kept Brussels as his base for seven years, travelling widely in Europe, Africa and the Middle East. He returned to England in 1981, settling in London, largely to develop his political interests. As a freelance writer on international affairs, he worked mainly for the BBC (Radio 4 and World Service), but also contributed to The Guardian, The Independent, The Economist, The Spectator, The Oldie, The Tablet, Society Today and The Liberal, among others.

For a decade, he regularly appeared on the Today Programme's 'Thought for the Day', as a Quaker (having joined the Religious Society of Friends after his experiences in Vietnam), but in later years became better known for his despatches in From Our Own Correspondent. He travelled to 160 countries, reporting, researching or making radio documentaries.

From 1993, Fryer taught Humanities part-time at London University's School of Oriental and African Studies (SOAS), and later began teaching at City University (Writing Non-Fiction). He lectured frequently on cruise ships, notably around the Mediterranean and the Red Sea, as well as to groups and associations in the UK. Through the British Council and the Foreign and Commonwealth Office, he gave seminars on democracy-building and the media in locations such as Egypt, Ethiopia and Uruguay. He was a Consultant with Public Affairs International (London).

== Politics ==
Fryer joined the Young Liberals after Jo Grimond came to his school during the 1964 general election. He was successively Vice-Chairman of the North West Young Liberal Federation and Secretary of the Oxford University Liberal Club. He served as a London borough councillor (in Bromley) from 1986 to 1990, and fought five general elections: Chelsea 1983, Orpington 1987, Leyton 1992, his home constituency of Poplar and Limehouse in 2010, and Dagenham and Rainham in 2017. His main political focus was, however, the European Parliament, for which he stood in London South East in the 1979, 1984 and 1994 elections. He stood on the LibDem list for the London region in each election from 1999 to 2019, coming within 0.6 per cent of winning a seat in the 2004 elections. He was the second candidate on the party's list for the 2004, 2009 and 2014 elections. In the 2019 European Parliament election, when three Liberal Democrat MEPs were elected, he was the fourth candidate on the party's list.

He held a variety of positions within the Liberal Democrats and predecessor parties, including chairing policy panels on international development (was Chairman of the Liberal International British Group), a member of the LibDems' international relations committee, an elected member of the governing Council of the European Liberal Democrats (ELDR) and was on the party's Interim Peers' List. As Chairman of the Liberal International British Group, he was automatically a Vice-President of Liberal International worldwide.

Outside party politics, active within the Religious Society of Friends (The Quakers), he was one of the small group that in 1979 set up the Quaker Council for European Affairs. This established Quaker House in Brussels situated in Square Ambiorix. He was the first Secretary of the group.

== Illness and death ==
On the afternoon of 24 March 2021, Fryer posted on his Facebook page: "Brain tumour. Incurable. Dying soon here or at St. Joseph’s Hospice, Hackney, Goodbye everyone, and thank you. Jonathan." He died three weeks later, on 16 April 2021.

== Books ==
- The Great Wall of China (1975)
- Isherwood (1977)
- Brussels As Seen by Naif Artists (1979, with Rona Dobson)
- Food for Thought (1981)
- George Fox and the Children of the Light (1991)
- Eye of the Camera (1993)
- Dylan (1993)
- The Sitwells (1994, with Sarah Bradford and John Pearson)
- André & Oscar (1997)
- Soho in the Fifties and Sixties (1998)
- Robbie Ross (2000)

Published By: The Hudson Review, Inc

- Wilde (2005)
- Fuelling Kuwait's Development (2007)
- "Kurdistan 2010"
- Eccles Cakes: An Odd Tale of Survival (2016)
