= Alliance EPP: European People's Party UK =

- Abbreviation: UK EPP
- Leader: Dirk Hazell
- Founded: 2012
- Headquarters: Office 103, 405 Kings Road, London, SW10 0BB
- Ideology: Conservatism; Pro-Europeanism
- Political position: Centre-right
- European affiliation: none
- Colours: Blue, gold and red

Website
- www.4freedomsparty.eu

The Alliance EPP: European People's Party UK, also known as UK EPP and the 4 Freedoms Party, is a pro-European Union, centre-right political party in the United Kingdom. It first contested an election at the 2014 European Parliament elections.

== Political stance ==
The party leader is Dirk Hazell, who is a former Conservative councillor, who has also been a candidate for the Liberal Democrats.

In its initial campaign before the 2014 European Parliament elections, the party was critical of the Conservative Party's departure from the European People's Party group in 2009 and opposed calls for the United Kingdom to leave the European Union. It positioned itself as a conservative, pro-European alternative to the Conservative Party and the UK Independence Party, which it condemned as "Britain's hard right". The party called for EU reform and a greater focus on jobs and training. It expressed support for Franklin D. Roosevelt's Four Freedoms, in addition to the EU's Four Freedoms. The UK EPP claimed an association with the European People's Party family but is not actually a member.

== European Parliament elections ==
In 2014, the party fielded candidates for the European election in the London constituency only. It polled 28,014 votes across the city and failed to win any seats.

The party had little public activity following the 2014 European Parliament election.

Alliance EPP did not contest the 2019 European Parliament election. Its political space became occupied predominantly by Change UK, formed in early 2019 by former Labour and Conservative members, which stood candidates in all constituencies except Northern Ireland. Change UK gathered 571,846 votes (3.3%) but did not win any seats.

== Other Conservative EPP MEPs in 2014-2019 ==
Without any link to the Alliance EPP party, two British MEPs formerly elected with the Conservative Party, Richard Ashworth and Julie Girling, joined the European People's Party group on 28 February 2018. Ashworth later joined Change UK and was a candidate for it at the 2019 European Parliament election, at which he failed to be re-elected. Girling did not stand for re-election in the 2019 European Parliament election, declaring support for the Liberal Democrats, and later became the leader of the Renew Party. Alliance EPP's founder, Dirk Hazell, has been critical of Girling and Ashworth on Twitter.

== See also ==
- The Pro-Euro Conservative Party (1999–2001), which contested the 1999 European Parliament election on a similar Pro-European Conservative platform, earning 138,097 votes (1.3%).
- The UK European Union Party (est. 2019), another minor party which contested the 2019 Peterborough by-election, earning 25 votes (0.1%), and the 2019 European Parliament election in three constituencies, earning 33,576 votes (0.2%).
