= Claude Moraes =

British politician and campaigner (born 1965)

The Right Honourable The Lord Moraes OBE
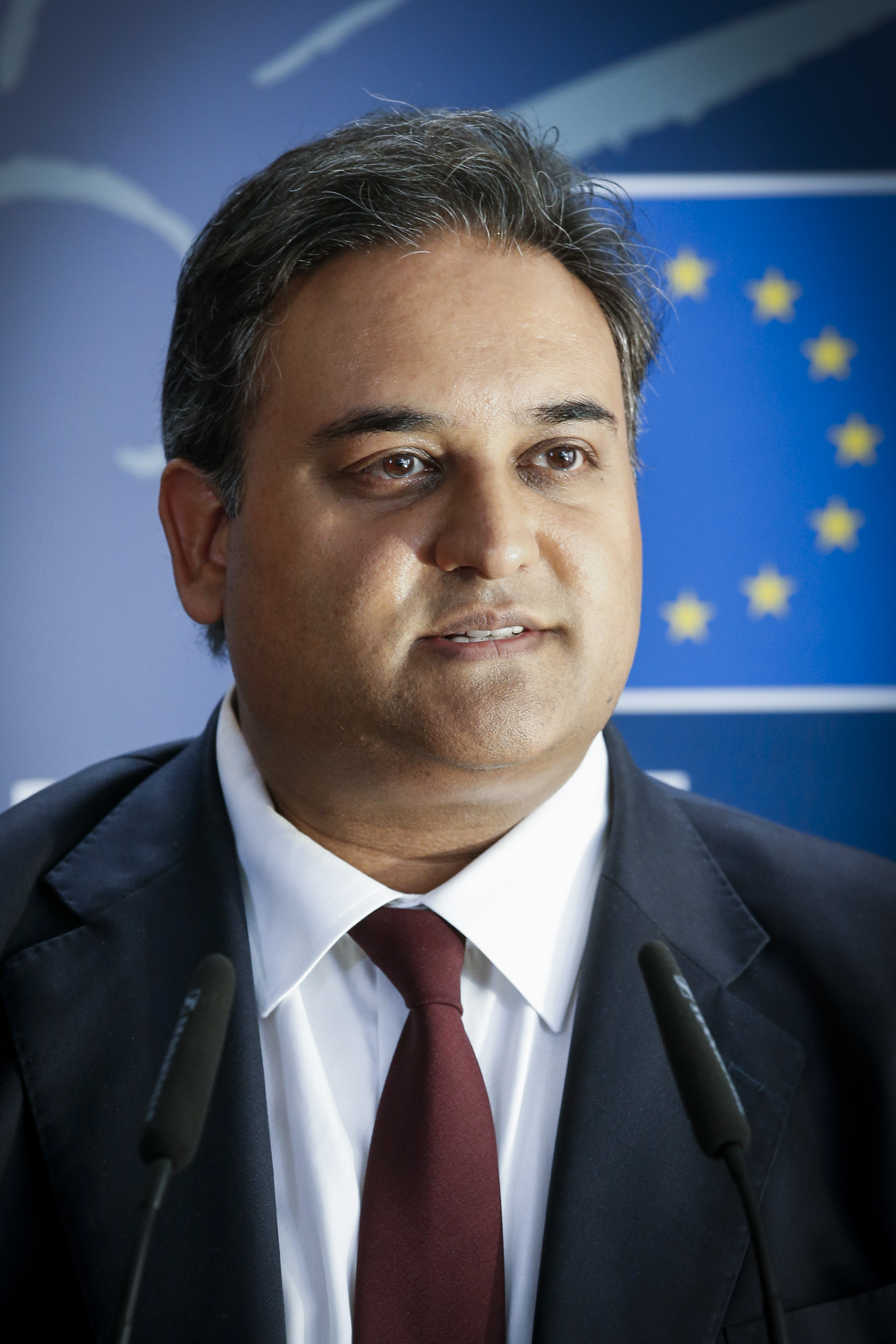
- Moraes in 2014

Lord-in-Waiting Government Whip
- In office 10 February 2025 – 22 July 2025
- Preceded by: Baron Cryer
- Succeeded by: Baron Lemos

Member of the House of Lords
- Lord Temporal
- Life peerage 15 January 2025

Member of the European Parliament for London
- In office 15 July 1999 – 31 January 2020
- Preceded by: Constituency established
- Succeeded by: Constituency abolished

Personal details
- Born: Claude Ajit Moraes Aden
- Party: Labour
- Education: University of Dundee; Birkbeck, University of London; London School of Economics

Claude Ajit Moraes, Baron Moraes, OBE is a British Labour Party life peer and campaigner, who was a member of the European Parliament (MEP) for London between 1999 and the United Kingdom's withdrawal from the EU in 2020.

== Background ==
Claude Moraes is of Indian descent. Born in Aden, he grew up in Scotland, having moved to Dundee aged five from India. His parents are Indian Catholics from Karnataka and Mumbai. He attended St Modan's High School and studied law at the University of Dundee, Birkbeck, University of London and the London School of Economics and Political Science. He is an Associate Fellow at The City Law School, University of London, Institute for the Study of European Law (ISEL).

== Previous work ==
After leaving Scotland, Moraes lived and volunteered at Toynbee Hall, an East London charity, where he was a Council Member.

He was House of Commons researcher to MPs John Reid and Paul Boateng following the 1987 general election and a policy officer at the Trades Union Congress in 1989.

Claude Moraes received recognition as director of the Joint Council for the Welfare of Immigrants, a refugee and migration legal protection NGO founded in 1967. At JCWI he helped organise legal challenges in the UK and European Courts, succeeding Dame Anne Owers as director in 1992. Moraes was appointed a Commissioner at the Commission for Racial Equality 1997-2002 and was an elected council member of Liberty 1994–2004.

He contested the parliamentary constituency of Harrow West in the 1992 general election, placing second.

== Member of the European Parliament, 1999–2020 ==
He was elected to the European Parliament in the 1999 European elections, - the first South Asian (Indian) origin MEP. He was re-elected to the European Parliament at the number one position on the Labour Party list for London in the 2004 and again in the first-place position in the 2009,2014 and 2019 European Elections.

Initially a member of the Employment and Social Affairs and Legal Affairs and Internal Market Committees he was involved in the campaign for the EU wide implementation of the Race Equality Directive (2000). His legislative reports include the Protection of Minorities in an Enlarged Europe (2005), Protection of Seasonal Workers in the EU (2014) and Blue Card Migration Directive (Revision) (2017).

From 2009 to 2014 he was the elected Spokesperson for the Socialists and Democrats Group (S&D) on the Civil Liberties, Justice and Home Affairs Committee.

In 2013 he was Rapporteur for the EU Inquiry into Mass Surveillance following the leaks from Edward Snowden. The Inquiry and his Report "US NSA surveillance programmes, surveillance bodies in various Member States and their impact on EU citizens' fundamental rights and on transatlantic cooperation in Justice and Home Affairs", voted in March 2014, was sometimes referred to as the Parliament's "European Digital Bill of Rights" looking at human rights and regulatory issues for the EU in data protection, governance of the internet, encryption, and cybercrime. In 2015 he gave the Annual CRISP Lecture on 'Mass Surveillance, EU Citizens and the State' at the LSE.

He chaired the EU Inquiry into Facebook in 2018 opening with a special evidence session questioning Mark Zuckerberg. The inquiry looked at electoral interference, misuse of personal data, and the obligations of Big Tech.

In July 2014 Moraes was elected chairman of the European Parliament Committee on Civil Liberties, Justice and Home Affairs (LIBE Committee), chairing EU legislative trilogues including GDPR, and the Anti-Money Laundering Directive (AMLD). He was a negotiater for the Parliament with third countries on a number of data adequacy and security agreements including the EU/US Terrorist Finance Tracking Programme (SWIFT).

Following the 2016 United Kingdom European Union membership referendum, he was a member of the European Parliament's Brexit Steering Committee until the 2019 European Elections. He contributed to the Parliament's position on the Withdrawal Agreement on EU citizens rights, rights of British citizens in the EU, security union, law enforcement, data adequacy, migration, asylum law and free movement.

In 2018 as part of his committee's increasing role in the humanitarian, budgetary and legislative aspects of the refugee crisis, he led delegations to Libya, Niger, Lebanon, Syrian border and the Greek and Italian reception "hotspots" to improve the EU's response. In 2019 he was Rapporteur for the European Asylum Support Agency and a Parliament negotiator for the EU Pact on Migration and Asylum presented to the EU Commission in 2020.

Also in 2018 he was Standing Rapporteur for the Parliament consent procedure on the European Commission's decision to directly invoke Article 7 of the EU Treaties for the first time into alleged rule of law breaches by the Polish government. He led all-party rule of law delegations that year to Poland and Slovakia following the murder there of investigative journalist Ján Kuciak.

In 2019 he co-chaired EU negotiations to appoint the first European Chief Public Prosecutor to primarily tackle corruption, calling on EPPO's remit to be extended to fight serious organised crime, including people trafficking.

In the May 2019 European elections Moraes stood for the Labour Party in the London constituency and was elected to the European Parliament for a fifth time. Following those elections he was elected vice president of the Socialists and Democrats Group (S&D) in the European Parliament.

== House of Lords ==
Moraes was nominated for a life peerage by Prime Minister Keir Starmer in late 2024. He was created Baron Moraes, of Hawkhill in the City of Dundee, on 15 January 2025, and was introduced to the House of Lords on 16 January. On 10 February 2025, he was appointed as a lord-in-waiting government whip. He left the Government on 22 July 2025. He was appointed to the Justice and Home Affairs Select Committee in January 2026.

== Honours and recognition ==
In 2011 Moraes was Dod's and the European Parliament Magazine's 'MEP of the Year' for work on human rights. In 2016 he was named as one of Politico's "40 MEPs Who Actually Matter". In 2017 the organisation Vote Watch Europe listed him as "the most influential" British MEP and sixth most influential MEP in the European Parliament. In 2019 he was given the Ambassador Award for work on EU citizens rights by the3million. Claude Moraes was appointed Officer of the Order of the British Empire (OBE) in the 2020 New Year Honours for services to human rights, and awarded an honorary doctorate (DUniv) by the University of Greenwich in 2022.
