= Marina Yannakoudakis =

British politician (born 1986)

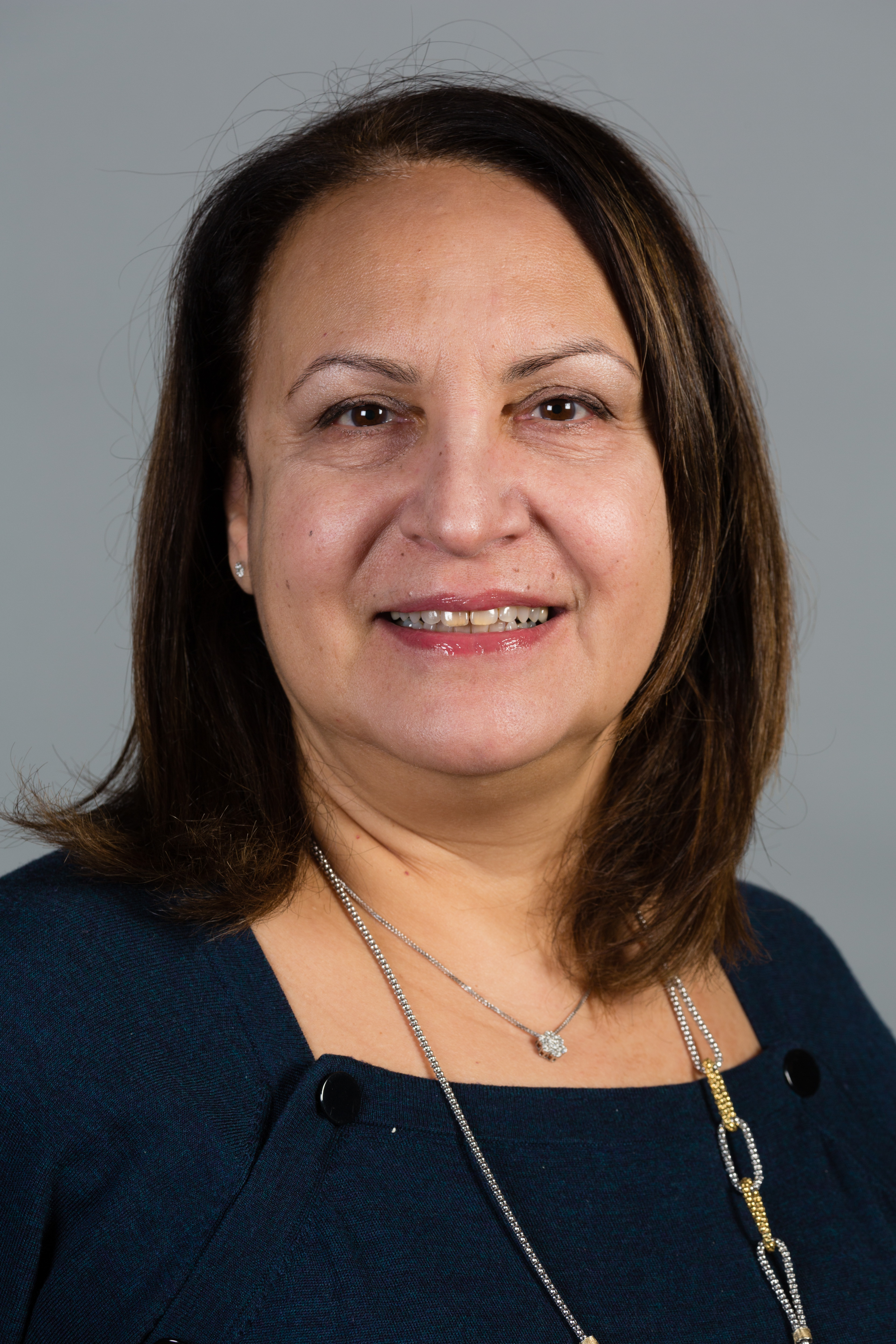

Member of the European Parliament for London
- In office 4 June 2009 – 2 July 2014
- Preceded by: John Bowis
- Succeeded by: Lucy Anderson

Personal details
- Born: Marina Yallouros; 16 April 1956 (age 70) Paddington, London, England, United Kingdom
- Party: Conservative
- Spouse: Zacharias Yannakoudakis
- Education: Brunel University; Open University
- Website: Official website

Marina Yannakoudakis (born 16 April 1956) is a member of the European Economic and Social Committee and a former Conservative Member of the European Parliament for London. She was elected at the 2009 European Parliament election. She lost her seat at the 2014 election.

== Early years ==
Yannakoudakis was born in Paddington. She studied for a BSc in government, politics and modern history at Brunel University of London (BUL), where she was chairman of the Conservative students, and also received an MA in education from the Open University.

She was a member of Barnet London Borough Council for Oakleigh Park Ward from 2006 to 2010 where she was chair of the Cleaner, Greener, Transport and Development Overview & Scrutiny Committee.

== Member of the European Parliament ==
She was a full member of the Committee on Women's Rights and Gender Equality, the Committee on the Environment, Public Health and Food Safety and a substitute member of the Special Committee on Organised Crime, Corruption and Money Laundering. She was a member of the Delegation to the EU-Former Yugoslav Republic of Macedonia Joint Parliamentary Committee.

She was also a member of the High-Level Contact Group for relations with the Turkish Cypriot community in the northern part of the island and was the Conservative and the European Conservatives and Reformists spokesman on Women's Rights and Gender Equality.

== Women's Rights ==
Yannakoudakis campaigned against EU plans to give women 20 weeks maternity leave on full pay. She led calls in the Committee on Women's Rights and Gender Equality for an impact assessment of the legislation to be conducted which resulted in the proposals being shelved. She has also spoken out against EU proposals to have a quota for women on boardrooms, where she described the proposals as "patronising".>

She pushed for a redress to the Test Achats vs Council of Ministers case, a European Court of Justice ruling which determined it was illegal for insurance companies to discriminate on the basis of gender in the European Union.

Yannakoudakis also worked on issues related to women and entrepreneurship and child protection.

Yannakoudakis led a campaign in the European Parliament against female genital mutilation.

== Health and Environment ==
In the Committee on the Environment, Public Health and Food Safety she concentrated on public health issues, where she spoke out on the need for stricter rules for EU doctors as well as ensuring that MRI scanner rules are not over-regulated by EU law. She drafted the committee's report on the voluntary donation of tissues and cells which called for more donations of cord blood for stem cell transplants. She is the committee's contact point for the European Centre for Disease Prevention and Control.

Yannakoudakis led a campaign to ensure that EU rules do not make it more difficult for electronic cigarette users to access e-cigs.

== Cyprus and LGBT Rights ==
Yannakoudakis worked to support efforts to find people who went missing during the Turkish invasion of Cyprus and Cypriot intercommunal violence. She was a member of the European Parliament Intergroup on LGBT Rights. She has campaigned for the decriminalisation of homosexuality in Northern Cyprus. She met and received assurances from Turkish Cypriot leader Dr. Derviş Eroğlu that he would sign a repeal of the gay ban into law and by putting pressure on the authorities in the north she was instrumental in overturning the anti-gay law.

She supported LGBT rights by co-authoring a resolution on LGBT rights in Africa especially the protection of lesbians and called on the EU to suspend its aid to Uganda in light of the Uganda Anti-Homosexuality Bill.

== Opposition to EU Policy ==
Yannakoudakis was strongly opposed to the introduction of a European Union financial transaction tax which she believed would have an adverse effect on the City of London. She has also campaigned to protect companies in her constituency threatened by EU rules including Prudential plc. She led a cross-party multi-national campaign to secure a level playing field for sugar cane refiners, including London's Tate & Lyle where jobs are under threat.

She led campaigns to seek savings in the EU budget. She raised concerns about spending on EU orchestras and has called for cuts to be made to the European Personnel Selection Office. and the Agencies of the European Union. She criticised the EU spending €2 million a year on Europe Day.

Yannakoudakis made a number of comments on the enlargement of the EU. She voted against the accession of Iceland to the European Union citing the ongoing Icesave dispute as an obstacle to EU membership. Yannakoudakis called for Iceland to fully compensate all UK depositors, especially the London councils which had invested surplus money. She also opposed a European Parliament report recommending the accession of Turkey to the European Union citing concerns about Ankara's failure to fully respect women's and minority rights, especially Kurds in Turkey. She also criticised Turkey's refusal to work with the 2012 Cypriot Presidency of the Council of the European Union.

== Personal life ==
She married her Greek-born husband, Zacharias Yannakoudakis, in 1983. She was finance director of the company that they founded and ran together until her election; the couple has three children. The family lives in Barnet.
