= Mary Honeyball =

British politician (born 1952)

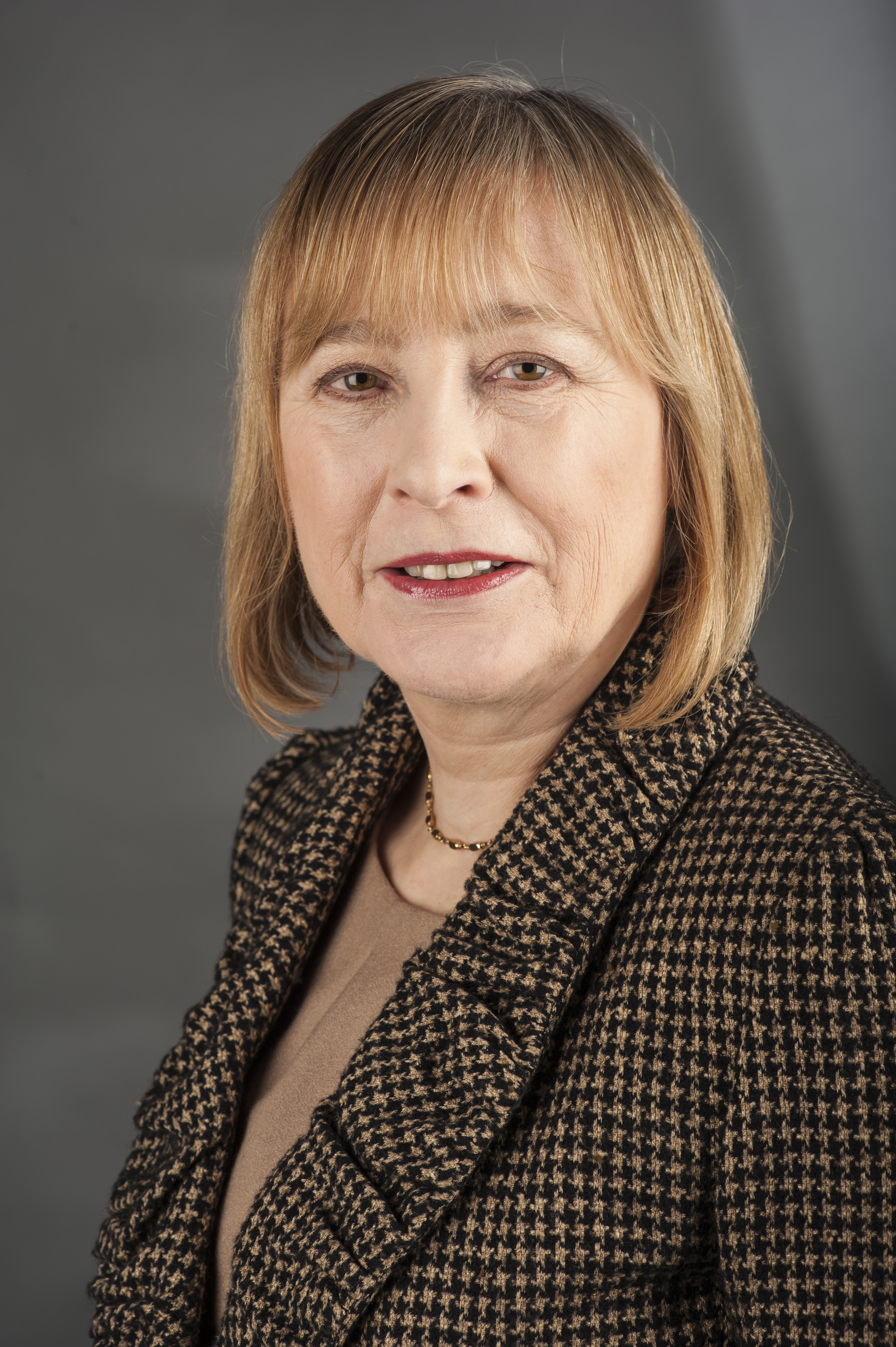
- Mary Honeyball in Strasbourg, 2014

Member of the European Parliament for London
- In office 17 February 2000 – 1 July 2019
- Preceded by: Pauline Green
- Succeeded by: Luisa Porritt

Personal details
- Born: 12 November 1952 (age 73) Weymouth, Dorset, United Kingdom
- Party: Labour
- Education: Somerville College, Oxford
- Profession: Public administration

Mary Hilda Rosamund Honeyball (born 12 November 1952) is a former British Labour Party politician. She was a Member of the European Parliament (MEP) for London from 2000 to 2019. Seventh on Labour's 1999 list, she had not been elected in the 1999 European Parliament election, but replaced Pauline Green, who resigned as an MEP in November 1999. Honeyball was subsequently elected to the European Parliament in 2004, 2009, and 2014. She did not stand for re-election in 2019, and resigned from the Labour Party shortly after voting closed in the UK. Honeyball rejoined the Labour Party during 2021.

== Biography ==
Honeyball was educated at Somerville College, Oxford. Before her election to the European Parliament, Honeyball's career was in the charitable and non-governmental sector. During the 1980s, she ran the Council for Voluntary Service in the London Borough of Newham, before going on to work as a Senior Manager for Scope, the disability charity. She was later the General Secretary of the Association of Chief Officers of Probation from 1994 to 1998, and prior to that Chief Executive of Gingerbread, the charity for single parent families. She was also a councillor in the London Borough of Barnet from 1978 to 1986. Honeyball unsuccessfully contested Enfield Southgate in 1983 and Norwich North for Labour in 1987.

Honeyball was Chair of the Greater London Labour Party Women's Committee during the 1980s and spent three years as Treasurer of Emily's List, an organisation that helps pro-choice Labour women campaign for seats in Parliament. Honeyball was the UK Labour representative in the Women's Rights and Gender Equality Committee in the European Parliament and served as Vice-Chair of the Committee from 2014 to 2019. She also held the position of Socialist & Democrat group co-ordinator on the Parliament's Culture and Education committee. She was also a regular blogger on women's rights, religion, and politics, and is an honorary associate of the National Secular Society.

When commenting on the Human Fertilisation and Embryology Bill in May 2008, Honeyball asked whether ministers should be allowed to remain on the front bench of government if they decide to oppose abortion legislation. In the same article, Honeyball also said that Catholicism exercised a "vice-like grip" on the legislative processes over large parts of Continental Europe, blocking women in Ireland and Portugal's right to abortion.

Honeyball opposes prostitution because she considers it a form of violence against women. She supports the criminalization of the purchase of sex, while decriminalizing, and assisting, the people, mainly women, who sell sex.

On 20 June 2018, Honeyball voted in favour of controversial mechanisms contained in the European Copyright Directive that would require internet companies to make "best efforts" to prevent people uploading copyrighted materials, including those contained in internet memes.

Honeyball did not stand in the Labour list for the 2019 European Parliament election, and announced, shortly after voting closed, that she had left the Labour Party, citing the party's "disastrous stance on Brexit" and the party's failure to act on anti-Semitism within the party. She rejoined the Labour Party in 2021.

Honeyball has described herself as "a humanist", and has been a regular blogger on women's rights, religion, and politics. She is a patron of Humanists UK.
