= Alf Lomas =

British politician (1928–2021)

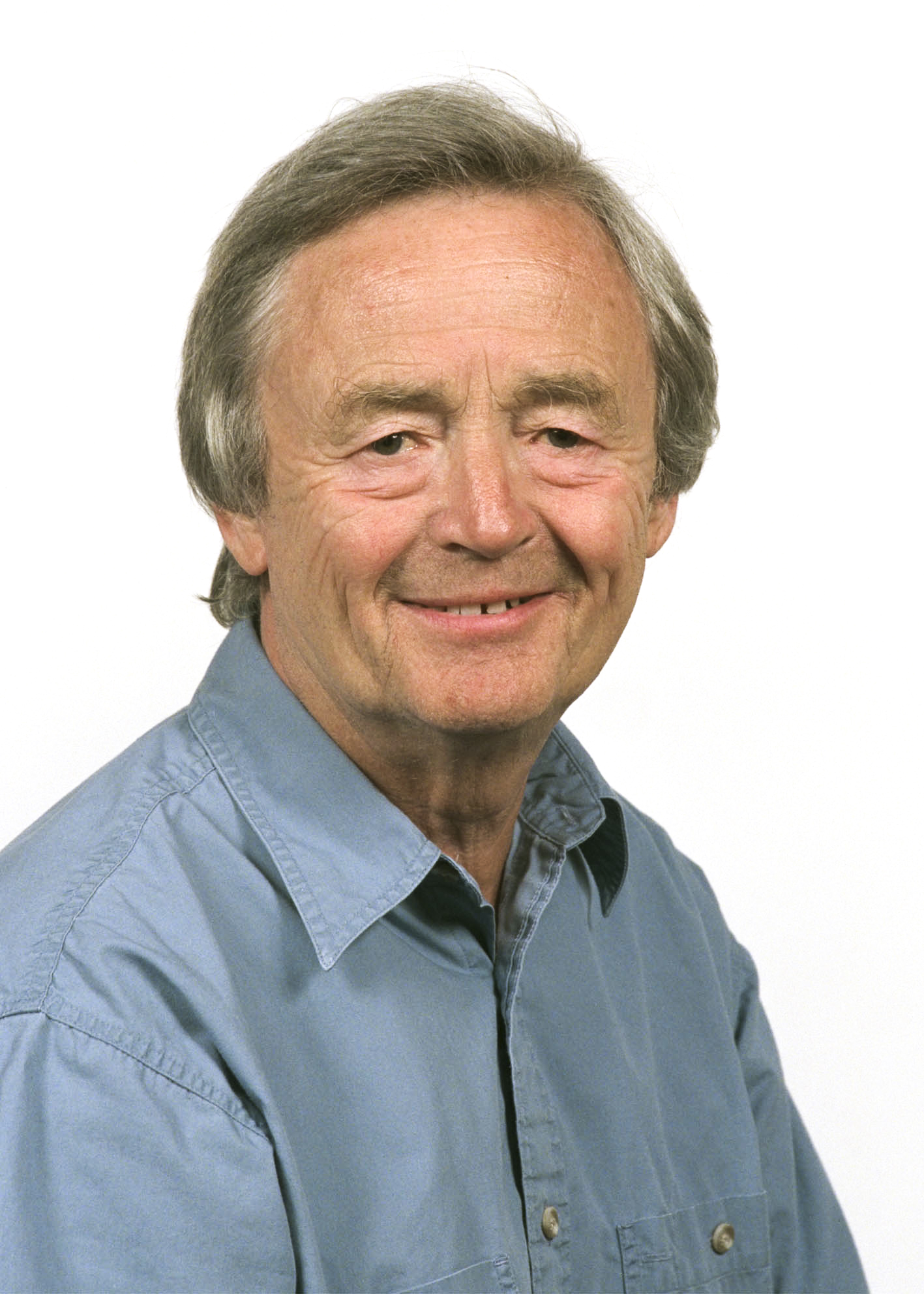
- Lomas in 1994

Member of the European Parliament for London North East
- In office 1979 – 20 July 1999
- Preceded by: Constituency established
- Succeeded by: Constituency abolished

Personal details
- Born: Alfred Lomas; 30 April 1928 Stockport, England, United Kingdom
- Died: 6 January 2021 (aged 92)
- Party: Labour

Alfred Lomas (30 April 1928 – 6 January 2021) was a British Labour politician who served as the Member of the European Parliament (MEP) for London North East for its entire existence, from the first European election in 1979 to the reorganisation of constituencies in 1999.

== Career and education ==
Lomas was educated in Stockport, before becoming a solicitor's clerk, a railway signalman, and spending time in the armed forces. He joined the Labour Party and served as a councillor, also becoming a full-time party agent. At the 1979 European Parliament election, he was elected for London North East, and from 1985 until 1987, he served as the leader of the European Parliamentary Labour Party.

Within the Parliament, Alfred LOMAS was vice-chair, Member of the Bureau and Member of the Socialist Group and Member of the Group of the Party of European Socialists.

He was chair and Member of the Delegation for relations with the countries of Central America and the Contadora Group.

During his legislative terms, Alfred Lomas was Member of the Political Affairs Committee; Member of the Committee on Development and Cooperation; Member of the Committee on Budgetary Control; Member of the Committee on Petitions and Member of the Committee on Legal Affairs and Citizens' Rights.

He was Member of the Delegation for relations with Latin - America; Member of the Delegation for relations with Canada; Member of the Delegation to the EU-Cyprus Joint Parliamentary Committee and Member of the Delegation to the EU-Malta Joint Parliamentary Committee.

Alfred Lomas was Member from the European Parliament to the Joint Assembly of the Agreement between the African, Caribbean and Pacific States and the European Economic Community (ACP-EEC).

Party political offices
Preceded by Barbara Castle	Leader of the European Parliamentary Labour Party; 1985–1987	Succeeded by David Martin
