= Charles Tannock =

British psychiatrist and politician (born 1957)

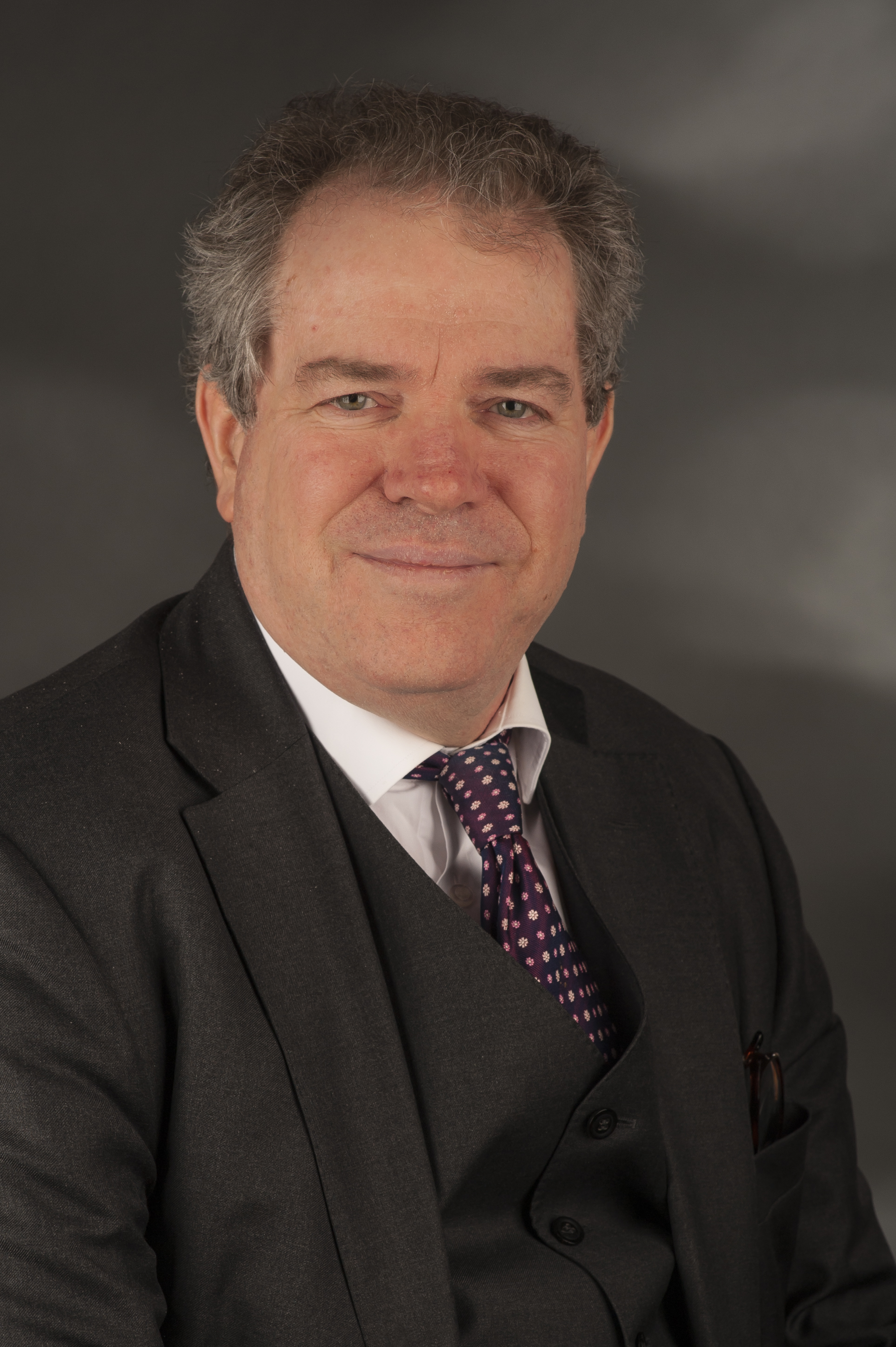

Member of the European Parliament for London
- In office 10 June 1999 – 1 July 2019
- Preceded by: Position established
- Succeeded by: Irina Von Wiese

Personal details
- Born: 25 September 1957 (age 69) Aldershot, Hampshire, England
- Citizenship: United Kingdom; Ireland (from 2017)
- Party: Conservative (until 2021)
- Education: Balliol College, Oxford; University College London

Dr Timothy Charles Ayrton Tannock MBE (born 25 September 1957) is a British psychiatrist, independent politician and former Member of the European Parliament (MEP) for London.

== Education ==
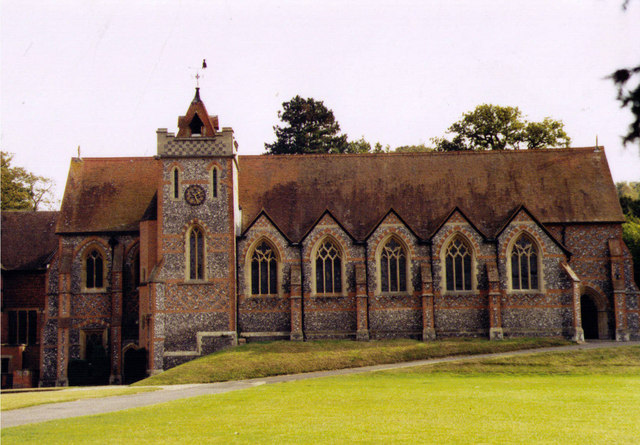
Bradfield College

Tannock was educated at Bradfield College, before going up to read medicine at Balliol College, Oxford, followed by the Middlesex Hospital Medical School, London University, where he qualified as a doctor. He speaks French, Italian, Spanish and Portuguese having spent part of his early life living abroad, first in Italy between the age of 4 and 8 then Portugal from 8 till early adulthood when he completed university.

He is a dual British and Irish citizen.

== Political career ==
Tannock was first elected to the European Parliament in 1999 and re-elected for his fourth term in 2014. He was Vice-President of the Human Rights Subcommittee of the Parliament 2004–07 and Vice-President of the EU-Ukraine PCC delegation 2004–09. He was Vice-President of the EP Delegation to the NATO Parliamentary Assembly 2009–14, and was the UK Conservative Foreign Affairs Spokesman 2002–2019, and ECR Co-ordinator (Spokesman) 2009–2019 on the Foreign Affairs Committee. He was President of the Friends of Taiwan Group 2004-9 and was adviser to the UK Overseas Territories Association in the European Parliament, and was Vice-Chairman of European Friends of Israel 2006–11. He was President of the European Parliament Friends of Kurdistan 2014–2019. He was Co-President of the European Parliament Friends of the CPLP (Community of Portuguese Language Countries) 2014-2019. He was appointed a Commissioner for Human Rights of the British Conservative Party in 2011 and reappointed in 2015. The Sunday Times carried a two page spread on Dr Tannock. Tannock reported the Sunday Thames to the Press Complaints Commission http://www.pcc.org.uk/cases/adjudicated.html?article=Nzg4OA== but his complaint was rejected and the Sunday Times was vindicated in making claims that share options were not effectively declared in a now liquidated fracking company but had made it clear that the EU Parliament authorities had cleared Tannock of any breach of its rules on declaration of members' interests.

Tannock was Rapporteur, shadow Rapporteur and co-author on numerous Reports and Joint Resolutions of the European Parliament over his 20 years as MEP.

Notably in 2004 he was Rapporteur on the AFET Committee for the European Neighbourhood Policy Report and again in 2007 AFET Rapporteur for the Eastern Partnership Dimension of the ENP. In 2006 he was responsible as Rapporteur on the ECON Committee for the Report setting out Tax and Duty Free Allowances imported by travellers from third countries, still in force to date. In 2008 he was AFET Rapporteur for the opinion on the EU-India Free Trade Agreement. In 2012 he was AFET Rapporteur for the EU strategy for the Horn of Africa. In 2012 he was AFET Rapporteur on the opinion on the EU/China agreement following Bulgarian and Romanian accession. In 2013 He was AFET Rapporteur on the Human rights situation in the Sahel Region of Africa. In 2013 he was AFET Rapporteur for the opinion on the Efforts of the international community in the area of development and of state building in South Sudan. Between 2009 and 2019 he was AFET Rapporteur for the annual update EP Reports on Montenegro as an EU accession candidate country. In 2015 he was AFET Rapporteur on the opinion on Prevention of radicalisation and recruitment of EU citizens by terrorist organisations. In 2016 he was AFET Rapporteur on the EU/Canada Strategic Partnership Agreement. In 2017 he was AFET Rapporteur on the EU/New Zealand Partnership Agreement on Relations and Cooperation. In 2018 he was AFET Rapporteur on the modernised Association Agreement between the EU and Chile. Following the 2016 UK EU Referendum result Tannock wrote three ECR booklets on the critical UK internal and external security implications of Brexit as well as the consequences of Brexit in Ireland. They are published as "Brexit: The Security Dimension" in early 2017, "The Case for a New WEU" in 2018, and a "Hong Kong in Ireland: Northern Ireland's Brexit Opportunity" in late 2018. In November 2020 he coedited with Alistair Burt the Conservative Group for Europe Publication: "European Britain Global Britain: Foreign Affairs and International Relations Post-Brexit" which sets out a vision for UK working more closely with its EU partners on Foreign Policy, Defence and Security matters globally.

A pro-European, Tannock applied for, and obtained, Irish citizenship in response to Brexit, describing himself as a "pretty angry pro-European Tory". Tannock also stated with regards to what has happened since the Brexit referendum that "I am quite ashamed to be British in many ways", speaking in regards to the treatment of EU citizens. He told The Irish Times that he was proud to be Irish and was planning a "pilgrimage" to Ireland.

Tannock is a founder of #Masks4All, and co-signed an open letter of 100 Doctors titled "why are we still prevaricating over face masks"?

In January 2021 Tannock did not renew his membership of the UK Conservative Party and now declares himself free of all party affiliation and a floating voter at the next General Election.

== Psychiatric career and retirement abroad ==
Before being elected to the European Parliament, he was a Consultant psychiatrist at University College Hospital and Honorary Senior Lecturer at UCL Medical School. He was assistant Research Secretary of the Bow Group from 1989 to 1990, publishing Bow Group papers and made several contributions to the scientific literature particularly in the field of chronic fatigue syndrome and anxiety disorders as a medical researcher. After losing his seat in July 2019 as an MEP Tannock returned to part-time clinical practice in the NHS as a Consultant Psychiatrist in London. He finally retired in 2022 when he quit the UK to live with his family in Slovakia. In Bratislava he became in 2022 a Senior Associate Fellow at Globsec, the premier Slovak NGO dealing with international relations and global security. He also is involved in supporting the Irish and Portuguese diaspora communities in Slovakia. In 2024 he became Vice-President of the Portuguese Civic Association of Slovakia and in 2025 Member of the Consultative Committee of the Portuguese Embassy in Bratislava.

== Honours ==
Tannock has been given the Freedom of the City of Cartagena de Indias and is a Freeman of the City of London. He was decorated by the President of Ukraine as Knight (3rd Grade) of the Order of Merit (Ukraine) in 2006. He was awarded in 2009 the Medal of Mkhitar Gosh by the President of Armenia. In 2013 he was awarded an honorary doctorate by Yerevan State University. In 2010 he was created a Grand Officer of the Order of San Carlos of the Republic of Colombia for services in the field of diplomacy and international relations. In 2013 he was awarded the Presidential Order of Excellence by the President of Georgia. In 2016 he was awarded by the President of Armenia the Medal of Gratitude for his long standing services towards the international recognition of the Armenian genocide. In 2018 he was awarded the "Special Diploma of Appreciation" of the Slovak Foreign Ministry for services to Slovak international relations during the 25th independence anniversary celebration of the country. In July 2019 after the end of mandate as MEP he was awarded by the President of Montenegro the 1st Class Grade of the "Order of the Montenegrin Flag" in recognition of his wide-ranging work as Standing Rapporteur in the European Parliament for EU-Montenegrin relations between 2009 and 2019. He was appointed Member of the Order of the British Empire (MBE) in the 2020 New Year Honours for political service to international relations and human rights. In October 2025 the President of Portugal awarded him the Order of Prince Henry the Navigator in the grade of Commander ( Comendador) for lifetime services to Portugal and its overseas community.
