= John Bethell =

John Bethell may refer to:

- John Bethell (inventor) (c. 1804–1867), British solicitor and inventor
- John Bethell, 1st Baron Bethell (1861–1945), British banker and politician
- John P. Bethell (1907–1981), American politician
- John Bethell, 2nd Baron Bethell (1902–1965), Baron Bethell

== See also ==
- John Bethel (born 1957), Canadian ice hockey player
