= Lesley Lewis (art historian) =

British art historian

Lesley Lewis in 1928

Lesley Lewis FSA (née Lawrence; 8 March 1909 – 29 January 2010) was an English art historian and architectural historian, whose research focused on the Georgian era. She is known for her work to conserve Britain's architectural heritage. Her 1980 memoir of life in a minor country house before the Second World War remains in print, and provides a valuable record of this period.

== Early life and education ==
Lewis was born in 1909 to an upper-middle-class family. Her father, James Lawrence, was a solicitor from a legal family that included James Bacon, vice-chancellor of the Court of Chancery. Her mother, Kathleen (née Potts), was the daughter of a soldier. Lewis had an elder brother, Bill, and two younger sisters, Barbara and Joyce. She was the niece of Susan Lawrence, an early female MP of the Labour Party.

Lewis initially lived in a village near Brentwood, Essex; the family moved to a nearby country house, Pilgrims Hall, near Pilgrims Hatch, in 1913. She was educated at home by governesses until the age of seventeen; she then spent a year in Paris at a finishing school run by the Ozanne family, where she became fluent in French. She later gained the qualifications in mathematics and Latin required for university study via a correspondence course.

In 1932, she became one of the four founding students of the Courtauld Institute of Art, part of the University of London. She gained BA and MA degrees in art history; "The Rise of Neo-Classic Architecture in England" was the title of her thesis, which was supervised by James Byam Shaw.

== Biography and research ==
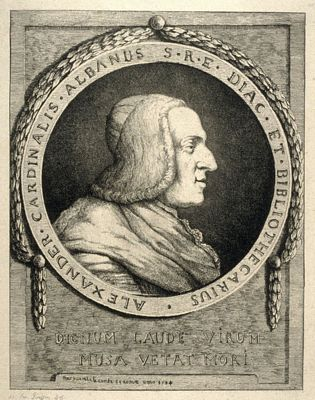
Alessandro Albani, subject of a book by Lewis

On leaving the Courtauld in 1937, her first job was as registrar of the City and Guilds of London Art School in Kennington. During the Second World War, Lewis additionally worked as a clerk in her family's Lincoln's Inn law firm, as well as serving as a fire lookout. Lewis published a "pioneering article" in 1938 on 18th-century British antiquarians Nicholas Revett and James Stuart (nicknamed "Athenian"), who co-wrote The Antiquities of Athens and Other Monuments of Greece.

In 1944, she married Dr David James Lewis, a medical entomologist who researched the insect vectors of tropical diseases such as leishmaniasis and malaria. He was the son of the rector of Shenfield, near her childhood home. The couple did not have children. After her marriage, Lewis's research was always fitted around the travel commitments associated with her husband's work on tropical diseases, which resulted in a wide and eclectic selection of research topics. They moved to the Sudan, where he was posted; there Lesley Lewis worked at the Agricultural Research Institute at Wad Medani as librarian and clerk, studying law by correspondence course in her spare time. She and her husband returned to London in 1955, after Sudan became independent from Britain. She was called to the Bar in 1956, becoming one of the earliest female members of Lincoln's Inn; although she did not practise, her legal training was important to her subsequent conservation work.

In the late 1950s and early 1960s, she researched materials in the London Public Record Office and the Vienna archives of the Holy Roman Empire relating to the Jacobite Court-in-Exile in 18th-century Rome of James Francis Edward Stuart, the so-called "Old Pretender", and British travellers on the Grand Tour. She collated the covert correspondence between Cardinal Alessandro Albani and Horace Mann, the English ambassor to Florence. Her book Connoisseurs and Secret Agents in Eighteenth Century Rome, published in 1961, focuses on the secret relationship between Albani, a Hanoverian sympathiser, and Philipp von Stosch, a Prussian antiquarian and collector who was unmasked as a spy for the British government. The book was well received, and was praised by art historian Brinsley Ford for its "judgement in selection" and "skill in presentation".

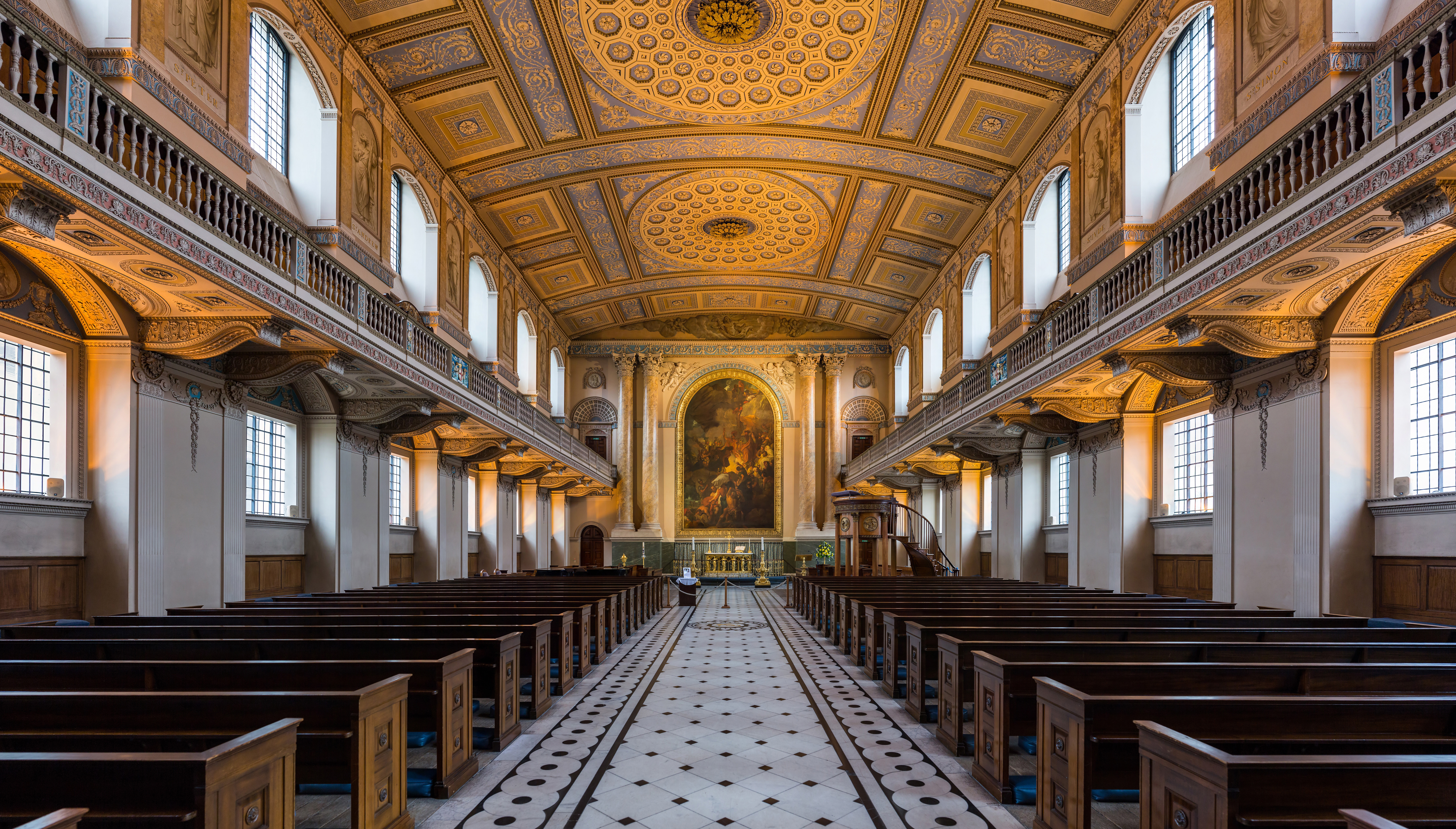
Chapel of Greenwich Hospital

A subsequent area of interest was Georgian funerary monuments in Colonial Jamaica. Lewis's obituary in The Times credits her research with stimulating the formation of the Georgian Society of Jamaica. She also published articles on Georgian architecture, including Greenwich Hospital Chapel by James Stuart and Home House by Robert Adam, the building that formerly housed the Courtauld Institute.

== Memoir ==
Her memoir, The Private Life of a Country House (1912–1939), recounts her childhood years at Pilgrims Hall, and forms a detailed account of upper-middle-class family life in a small English country house with servants before the Second World War. It first came out in 1980 and has since been reissued five times; the 2011 edition is associated with the National Trust. The Sunday Times describes it as a "minor classic", and a review of the first edition states "The charm of this book is that so many of the details of everyday life come alive and the more ordinary, prosaic things take on their true importance ... Reading it is rather like peering through the windows of a long-forgotten doll's house." Her recollections have been quoted by several recent texts; Pamela Sambrook writes that Lewis is "particularly successful at retrieving the memory of domestic trivia."

== Heritage work and later life ==
Lewis joined the Georgian Group in 1938, shortly after its foundation, and served as its chair in 1972–79, remaining on its executive committee until 1981. The organisation campaigns for the preservation of Georgian buildings; since 1971, it has been the official body consulted by the planning authorities of England and Wales on applications relating to all Georgian listed buildings and structures. She also served on various committees of the Society for the Protection of Ancient Buildings. She was vice-president of the Royal Archaeological Institute in 1980–81. She served as chair of the Chelsea Society in 1980–87.

She was elected fellow of the Society of Antiquaries in 1964. Her obituarist in The Times called the society her "spiritual home." She advised the society on giving financial grants to churches for conservation work, and served as its vice-president in 1980–84. In 2002 she was awarded its Society Medal. She was one of the trustees of Sir John Soane's Museum.

David Lewis became increasingly ill during the 1980s; he died in 1986. Lewis retained an active interest in the meetings of the Society of Antiquaries into her mid-nineties. In 2005, she recorded a total of 8 hours of interview for an oral history project of the Museum of London. She died in 2010, aged 100.

== Selected works ==
Books

- Connoisseurs and Secret Agents in Eighteenth Century Rome (1961)
- The Private Life of a Country House (1912–1939) (1980)
- The Thomas More Family Group Portraits After Holbein (1998)

Articles

- "English commemorative sculpture in Jamaica" (1972)
