= EveryDoctor =

UK advocacy group

EveryDoctor is a British grassroots advocacy group made up of doctors. The group was established in 2019, and grew during the COVID-19 pandemic in the United Kingdom. In May 2021, EveryDoctor and the Good Law Project brought legal action against the British government in relation to COVID-19 PPE contracts during the first wave of the COVID-19 pandemic, accusing the Department of Health and Social Care of unlawful procurement procedures and providing inadequate PPE supplies.

== See also ==
- COVID-19 contracts in the United Kingdom
