= Beauchamp baronets =

Set index for Beauchamp baronets

There have been two baronetcies created for persons with the surname Beauchamp, both in the Baronetage of the United Kingdom. Both titles are extinct.

- Beauchamp baronets of Grosvenor Place (1911)
- Beauchamp baronets of Woodborough (1918)

== See also ==
- Proctor-Beauchamp baronets
- Baron Beauchamp
