= London North West (European Parliament constituency) =

Former European Parliament constituency

- European Parliament constituency
- Boundary within London (1979-1984)
- Member state: United Kingdom
- Created: 1979
- Dissolved: 1999
- MEPs: 1

Prior to its uniform adoption of proportional representation in 1999, the United Kingdom used first-past-the-post for the European elections in England, Scotland and Wales. The European Parliament constituencies used under that system were smaller than the later regional constituencies and only had one Member of the European Parliament each.

The constituency of London North West was one of them.

When it was created in England in 1979, it consisted of the Westminster Parliament constituencies of Brent East, Brent North, Brent South, Chipping Barnet, Harrow Central, Harrow East, Harrow West, Hendon North and Hendon South. United Kingdom Parliamentary constituencies were redrawn in 1983 and the European constituencies were altered to reflect this. The new seat comprised the following Westminster constituencies: Brent East, Brent North, Brent South, Harrow East, Harrow West, Hayes and Harlington, Ruislip-Northwood and Uxbridge. These boundaries were used in 1984, 1989 and 1994.

Boundary within South East England and London (1984-1994)

Boundary within South East England and London (1994-1999)

== Members of the European Parliament ==
Elected	Members	Party
1979	Lord Bethell	Conservative
1984	Lord Bethell	Conservative
1989	Lord Bethell	Conservative
1994	Robert Evans	Labour
1999	Constituency abolished: see London	

== Election results ==
European Parliament election, 1979: London North West
Party	Candidate	Votes	%	±%
Conservative	Lord Bethell	87,596	55.3	N/A
Labour	Mildred Gordon	49,268	31.1	N/A
Liberal	G J Bridge	21,618	13.6	N/A
Majority		38,328	24.2	N/A
Turnout		158,482	31.3	N/A
Conservative win (new seat)				

European Parliament election, 1984: London North West
Party	Candidate	Votes	%	±%
Conservative	Lord Bethell	69,803	43.1	▼12.1
Labour	Pat Healy	62,381	38.6	▲7.5
Liberal	Andrew T. Ketteringham	29,609	18.3	▲4.7
Majority		7,422	4.6	▼19.6
Turnout		161,793	31.2	▼0.1
Conservative hold		Swing	▼9.8	

European Parliament election, 1989: London North West
Party	Candidate	Votes	%	±%
Conservative	Lord Bethell	74,900	41.3	▼1.8
Labour	A K (Keith) Toms	67,500	37.2	▼1.3
Green	Ian E Flindall	28,275	15.6	N/A
SLD	Christopher D Noyce	10,553	5.8	▼12.5
Majority		7,400	4.1	▼0.5
Turnout		181,228	35.8	▲4.6
Conservative hold		Swing	▼0.3	

European Parliament election, 1994: London North West
Party	Candidate	Votes	%	±%
Labour	Robert Evans	80,192	47.4	▲10.2
Conservative	Lord Bethell	62,750	37.1	▼4.2
Liberal Democrats	Hilary F Leighter	18,998	11.2	▲5.4
Green	Darren P Johnson	4,743	2.8	▼12.8
Communist (PCC)	Anne G Murphy	858	0.5	N/A
Natural Law	Theresa M Sullivan	807	0.5	N/A
21st Century Conservative	Colin R Palmer	740	0.5	N/A
Majority		17,442	10.3	N/A
Turnout		169,088	35.1	▼0.7
Labour gain from Conservative		Swing	▲7.2	
