= Baron Bethell =

Barony in the Peerage of the United Kingdom

Barony Bethell
- Or, on a chevron azure an estoile of the first, in chief two boar's heads couped of the second
- Creation date: 23 November 1922
- Created by: King George V
- Peerage: Peerage of the United Kingdom
- First holder: Sir John Bethell, 1st Baronet
- Present holder: James Nicholas Bethell, 5th Baron Bethell
- Heir apparent: Jacob Bethell
- Remainder to: Heirs male of the first baron's body lawfully begotten
- Motto: Servabo fidem ("I will keep faith")

John Bethell, 1st Baron Bethell

Baron Bethell, of Romford in the County of Essex, is a title in the Peerage of the United Kingdom. It was created in the 1922 Dissolution Honours for the banker and Liberal politician Sir John Bethell, 1st Baronet, who had previously represented Romford and East Ham North in Parliament. He had already been created a Baronet, of Romford in the County of Essex, on 26 June 1911.

The title descended from father to son until the early death of the third Baron, in 1967. The third Baron was succeeded by his first cousin, who became the fourth Baron; he was the son of William Gladstone Bethell, third son of the first Baron. The fourth Baron was a historian and Conservative politician.

As of 2025, the titles are held by the fourth Baron's eldest son, the fifth Baron, who succeeded in 2007. He was elected in 2018 to sit in the House of Lords as one of the 92 representatives of the hereditary peers.

== Barons Bethell (1922) ==
- John Henry Bethell, 1st Baron Bethell (1861–1945)
- John Raymond Bethell, 2nd Baron Bethell (1902–1965)
- Guy Anthony John Bethell, 3rd Baron Bethell (1928–1967)
- Nicholas William Bethell, 4th Baron Bethell (1938–2007)
- James Nicholas Bethell, 5th Baron Bethell (b. 1967)

The heir apparent is the present holder's son Jacob Nicholas Douglas Bethell (b. 2006).

Baronetage of the United Kingdom
Preceded by Ball baronets	Bethell baronets of Romford; 26 June 1911	Succeeded by Beauchamp baronets
