= 1926 East Ham North by-election =

UK parliamentary by-election

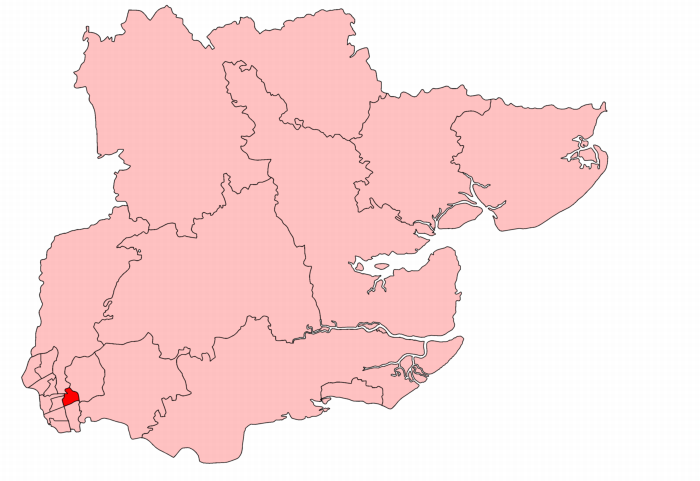
East Ham North

The 1926 East Ham North by-election of 29 April 1926 was held after the death of the Conservative politician and Member of Parliament (MP) Charles Williamson Crook. Labour took the seat in the by-election. with a majority of 1,627

== Candidates ==
- George Jarrett was the Conservative candidate and a director of a printing and publishing company.
- Susan Lawrence was the Labour candidate and had previous held the seat.
- Leslie Burgin was the Liberal Party candidate and a solicitor specialising in international law.

== Result ==
1926 East Ham North, by-election Electorate
Party	Candidate	Votes	%	±%
Labour	Susan Lawrence	10,798	40.64	+4.83
Conservative	George Jarrett	9,178	34.51	−5.04
Liberal	Leslie Burgin	6,603	24.85	+0.22
Majority		1,620	6.13	N/A
Turnout		26,572	71.71	−5.84
Labour gain from Conservative		Swing	+4.94	

== See also ==
- List of United Kingdom by-elections (1918–1931)
