= Susan Lawrence =

British politician and editor

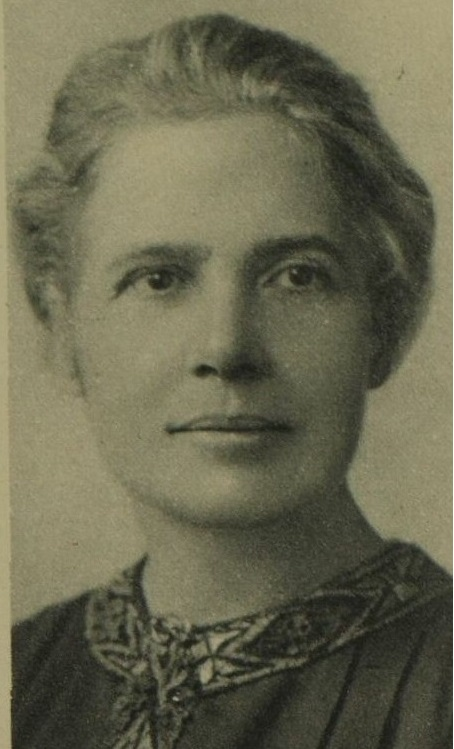
- Lawrence in 1920

Member of Parliament for East Ham North
- In office 21 July 1926 – 27 October 1931
- Preceded by: Charles Crook
- Succeeded by: John Mayhew
- In office 6 December 1923 – 28 October 1924
- Preceded by: Charles Williamson Crook
- Succeeded by: Charles Williamson Crook

Personal details
- Born: Arabella Susan Lawrence; 12 August 1871
- Died: 24 October 1947 (aged 76)
- Party: Conservative then Labour
- Education: Newnham College, Cambridge

Arabella Susan Lawrence (12 August 1871 – 24 October 1947) was a British Labour Party politician, one of the earliest female Labour MPs.

== Early life ==
Lawrence was the youngest daughter of Nathaniel Tertius Lawrence, a wealthy solicitor, and Laura Bacon, daughter of Sir James Bacon, a bankruptcy judge and Vice-Chancellor. Her great grandfather was Abraham Ogden of New Jersey, and she was also descended from the original Nonconformist Philip Henry.

== Education ==
She was educated in London and at Newnham College, Cambridge.

== Career ==
Originally a Conservative, she was a member of the London County Council 1910–1912, but after coming under the influence of the trades unionist Mary Macarthur she was converted to socialism, and rejoined the council as a Labour member from 1913 to 1927, becoming deputy chairman of the LCC 1925–26. She joined the Fabian Society, becoming close to Sidney Webb, and especially to his wife Beatrice Webb. During the First World War, she principally worked to improve the conditions of women factory workers.

As a member of the local council in Poplar, London (1919–24), led at the time by George Lansbury, Lawrence was part of the Labour group that defied central government and refused to set a rate, arguing that the poverty in the area meant that the poor were being asked to pay for the poor. Lawrence was imprisoned for five weeks in Holloway Prison in 1921, but ultimately she and her fellow councillors' campaign succeeded, in that government passed a law to equalise Poor Law rates.

Lawrence first stood, unsuccessfully, for Parliament at Camberwell North West at a by-election in 1920, but won East Ham North in the 1923 election which saw the first Labour government take office in the January of the following year. She was one of the first three female Labour MPs, alongside Dorothy Jewson and Margaret Bondfield, and the first woman elected to represent a London constituency. She objected to being referred to as a "woman MP", and is said to have rejoined "Why don't you call Churchill a man MP?" She was appointed Parliamentary Private Secretary to the President of the Board of Education. The minority government lasted only nine months; following the Zinoviev letter, the Labour Party lost the election of October 1924 and Lawrence was personally defeated. However, the Conservative victor, Charles Williamson Crook, died only 18 months later and Lawrence was easily re-elected at a by-election in April 1926.

In 1924, Lawrence visited Soviet Russia and spent six months travelling widely. Unlike the Webbs and other Fabians who went to Russia she did not believe everything the Bolsheviks alleged to foreign visitors, but tried to make contact with a wide variety of people, and she retained a critical attitude towards the Soviet system.

Susan Lawrence was appointed Parliamentary Secretary to the Ministry of Health in the second minority Labour Government elected in 1929. She was also the chair of the Labour Party Conference in Llandudno in 1930 – the first woman to hold the position. Like the vast majority of Labour MPs in Parliament, she refused to take part in Ramsay MacDonald's National Government in the summer of 1931, and she lost her seat in the 1931 general election, never again to be a Member of Parliament.

In 1935, Lawrence visited Palestine and was impressed by kibbutzim and Zionism in general. She subsequently tried, not very successfully, to persuade the Labour Party Conference that a socialist utopia was being created in Palestine which was benefitting Jewish and Arab workers alike. But, as always, her interest was not merely emotional, but practical and based on facts. In May 1936, the government appointed a Royal Commission under Lord Peel to investigate how the mandate was working in view of much communal strife between Jews and Arabs. Just before this finished its work in early 1937, Susan wrote a memorandum for the Labour Party's Advisory Committee on Imperial Affairs, on whose Palestine sub-committee she sat, stressing the problems arising for the Arabs because Jewish development was going so far ahead. The Mandate authorities, she felt, had neglected Arab needs for public works, land reclamation, and agricultural modernisation. Although the Palestine sub-committee had hoped for reconciliation rather than partition, by 1938 she was persuaded by labour leaders in Palestine to submit to the Labour party executive a memorandum saying that in the circumstances as they were, some form of partition was inevitable, and she hoped that the ensuing Jewish state would become affiliated to the Commonwealth.

Maintaining her work in the Labour Party, Lawrence was a member of the National Executive until 1941, and devoted much of her time to working with blind people for the remainder of her life. The detective novelist Cyril Hare and General Sir George Giffard were among her nephews. Lucy Norton, the translator of the writings of Louis de Rouvroy, Duc de Saint-Simon, and Lesley Lewis, art historian and author of The Private Life of a Country House, were among her nieces.

== Bibliography ==
- Lewis, Lesley. The Private Life of a Country House.
- Oxford Dictionary of National Biography
- Pugh, Martin. "Conservative 'Class Traitors'" in English Historical Review 1998
- Webb, Beatrice Diaries
- Craig, F. W. S. (1983) [1969]. British parliamentary election results 1918-1949 (3rd ed.). Chichester: Parliamentary Research Services. ISBN 0-900178-06-X.
- Centre for Advancement of Women in Politics: Susan Lawrence
- Leigh Rayment's Peerage Pages
- Hansard 1803–2005: contributions in Parliament by Arabella Lawrence

Parliament of the United Kingdom
| Preceded by Charles Crook | Member of Parliament for East Ham North; 1923–1924 | Succeeded by Charles Williamson Crook |
| Preceded by Charles Williamson Crook | Member of Parliament for East Ham North; 1926–1931 | Succeeded by John Mayhew |
Party political offices
| Preceded by Herbert Morrison | Chair of the Labour Party; 1929–1930 | Succeeded by Stanley Hirst |
