= Sir Henry Butlin, 1st Baronet =

British surgeon

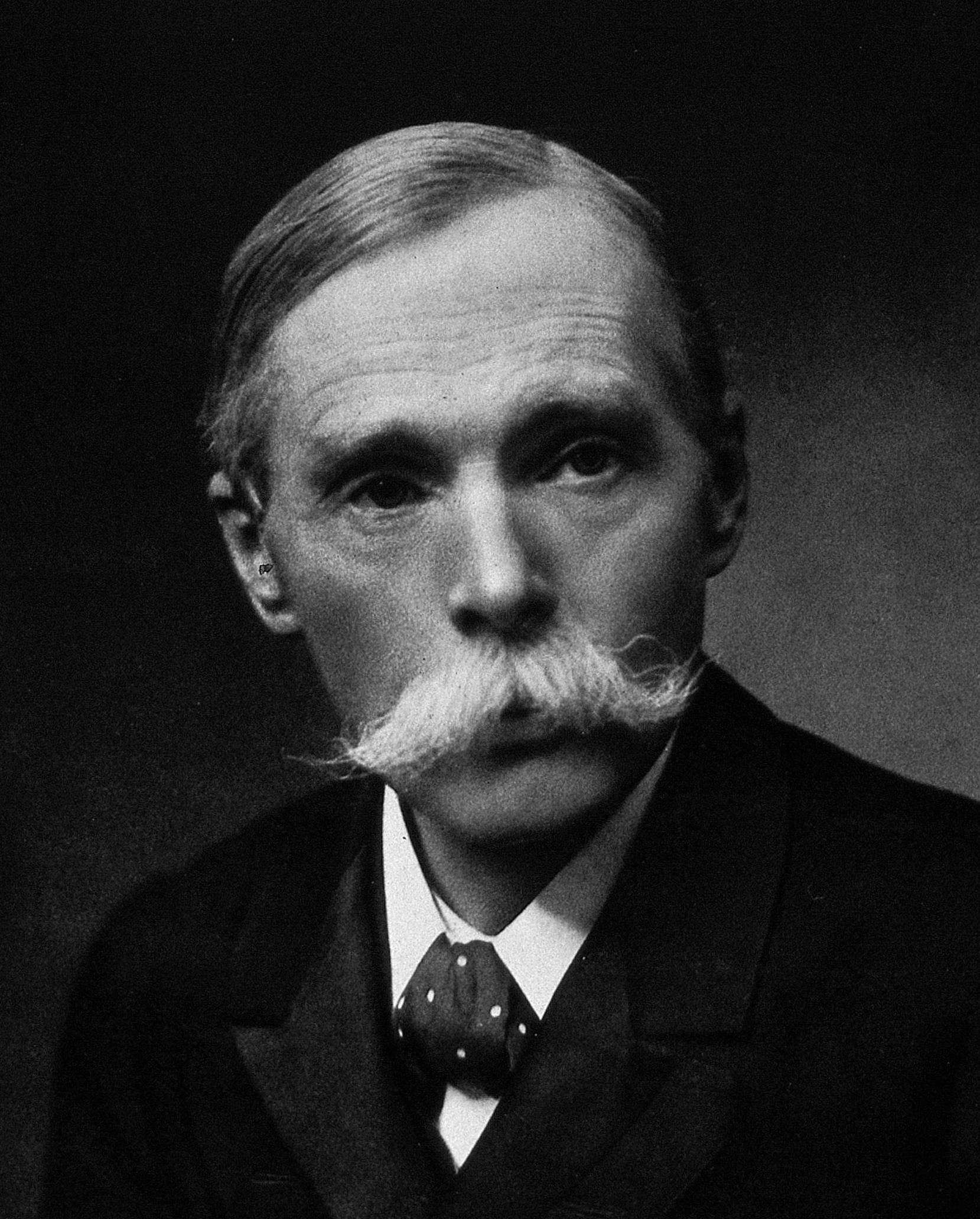
Henry Butlin

Sir Henry Trentham Butlin, 1st Baronet FRCS (24 October 1845 – 24 January 1912) was a British surgeon considered the "father of British head and neck surgery".

Butlin was created a Baronet of Harley Street in the Metropolitan Borough of St Marylebone on 28 June 1911. Sir Henry was succeeded by his son, Henry Guy Trentham Butlin, upon whose death in 1916 the baronetcy became extinct.

He was also the great-uncle of Sir Billy Butlin.

Baronetage of the United Kingdom
New creation	Baronet (of Harley Street); 1911–1912	Succeeded by Henry Guy Butlin
