= Charles Crook =

English politician (1862–1926)

Charles Williamson Crook

Member of Parliament for East Ham North
- In office 15 November 1922 – 6 December 1923
- Preceded by: John Henry Bethell
- Succeeded by: Susan Lawrence
- In office 29 October 1924 – 29 March 1926
- Preceded by: Susan Lawrence
- Succeeded by: Susan Lawrence

Personal details
- Born: 4 March 1862 Preston, Lancashire, England
- Died: 29 March 1926 (aged 64) Sidcup, Kent, England
- Party: Conservative and Unionist Party
- Spouse: Grace Swinfen
- Occupation: Teacher; trade union official

Charles Williamson Crook (4 March 1862 – 29 March 1926) was an English teacher, trade union official, and Conservative and Unionist Party politician. He was the Member of Parliament (MP) for East Ham North twice, from 1922 to 1923 and from 1924 to 1926.

Crook was born in Preston, Lancashire, on 4 March 1862, the son of William Crook. He was educated at St. James National School in Barrow-in-Furness, Alston College, and St. Johns College, Battersea. He became a BSc in 1886 and a BA in 1892 at London University. Crook held various appointments as a teacher and for 14 years was a member of the executive of the National Union of Teachers, becoming president for a year in 1916.

At the 1922 general election he was elected Member of Parliament for East Ham North for the Conservative and Unionist Party. He lost the seat the following year at the 1923 general election to the Labour Party candidate Susan Lawrence. Crook regained the seat at the 1924 general election and held it until his death.

== Family life ==
He married Grace Madeline Swinfen in 1900, and they had a son and a daughter. Crook died on 29 March 1926, aged 64, at his home in Sidcup, Kent, after a three-month illness.

Parliament of the United Kingdom
Preceded by John Henry Bethell	Member of Parliament for East Ham North; 1922 – 1923	Succeeded by Susan Lawrence
Preceded by Susan Lawrence	Member of Parliament for East Ham North; 1924 – 1926	Succeeded by Susan Lawrence
Trade union offices
Preceded by William Bridgland Steer	President of the National Union of Teachers; 1916–1917	Succeeded by Thomas Underdown
