= James Bethell, 5th Baron Bethell =

British politician (born 1967)

The Right Honourable The Lord Bethell
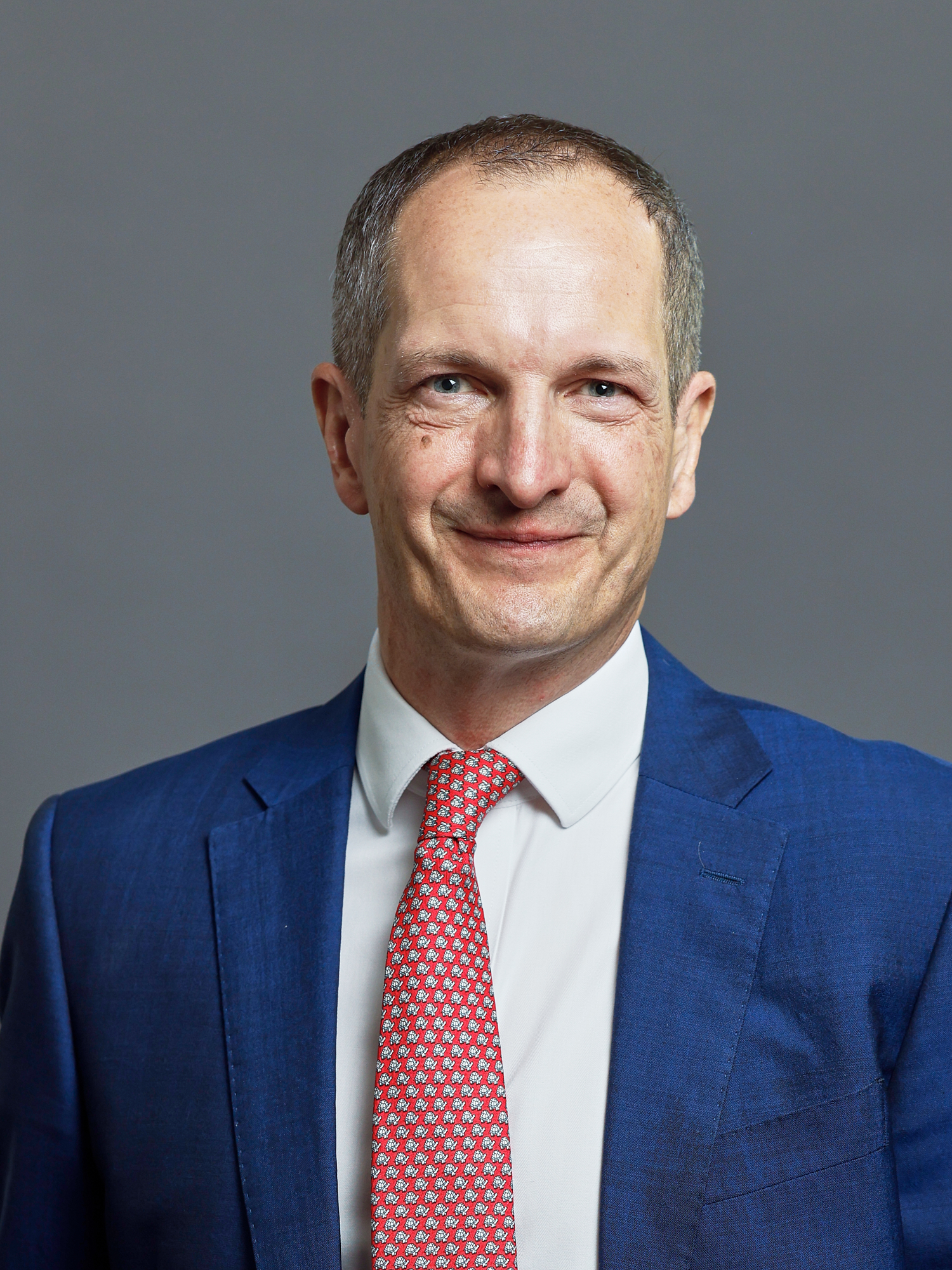
- Official portrait, 2025

Parliamentary Under-Secretary of State for Innovation
- In office 9 March 2020 – 17 September 2021
- Prime Minister: Boris Johnson
- Preceded by: The Baroness Blackwood of North Oxford
- Succeeded by: The Lord Kamall

Lord-in-waiting Government Whip
- In office 24 July 2019 – 9 March 2020
- Prime Minister: Boris Johnson
- Preceded by: The Viscount Younger of Leckie
- Succeeded by: The Baroness Penn

Member of the House of Lords
- Lord Temporal
- Elected Hereditary Peer; 19 July 2018 – 29 April 2026
- By-election: 2018
- Preceded by: The 3rd Baron Glentoran
- Succeeded by: Seat abolished

Personal details
- Born: James Nicholas Bethell; 1 October 1967 (age 59)
- Party: Conservative
- Education: Harrow School; University of Edinburgh

James Nicholas Bethell, 5th Baron Bethell (born 1 October 1967) is a British hereditary peer, Conservative politician and former member of the House of Lords. During the COVID-19 pandemic, he was Parliamentary Under-Secretary of State for Innovation at the Department of Health and Social Care and was involved in negotiating various controversial contracts.

== Early life ==
Bethell was educated at the independent, fee-paying Harrow School before going on to study for a Scottish Master of Arts (an undergraduate degree) at the University of Edinburgh.

Bethell worked as a journalist, and then managed the Ministry of Sound, a multimedia entertainment business based in London with a nightclub, before founding Westbourne Communications which he sold to Cicero Group after succeeding to his family titles.

== Political career ==
Bethell unsuccessfully contested election to the House of Commons for the Tooting constituency in the 2005 general election, losing to Labour candidate and future Mayor of London Sadiq Khan.

Bethell contested the 2009 primary to become the Conservative Party's prospective parliamentary candidate for the constituency of Gosport. He came second behind Caroline Dinenage, who went on to become the Member of Parliament in the 2010 general election.

=== House of Lords ===
Bethell entered the House of Lords in July 2018, after successfully contesting a Conservative hereditary peers' by-election. He had succeeded to the title of Baron Bethell following his father's death in 2007, but hereditary peers have not had an automatic right to a seat in the Lords since the House of Lords Act 1999.

In July 2019, he was appointed a Lord-in-Waiting and, in March 2020, was appointed as Parliamentary Under-Secretary of State for Innovation at the Department of Health and Social Care in the second Johnson ministry.

In November 2020, The Times reported Bethell's appointment as the Minister for NHS Test and Trace, formed as part of the Johnson ministry's efforts to control the COVID-19 pandemic. As minister, his responsibilities included life sciences, medicines, research, international diplomacy and relations, data and technology, and NHS security management, including cyber security. As the House of Lords health minister, he was responsible for representing health matters and legislation in the Upper House, and he moved the Coronavirus Bill at Third Reading and the Medicines and Medical Devices Bill at Second Reading in the Lords. As the junior minister supporting the health track of the United Kingdom’s G7 presidency, he took part in related health-policy work during the UK’s 2021 presidency. In July 2021, he was one of the ministers associated with the publication of the government's Life Sciences Vision, a ten-year strategy for the sector.

According to The Times, Bethell "was a surprise appointment in March having chaired Matt Hancock's leadership campaign in 2019 and giving [him] a £5,000 donation." He became the subject of allegations of "cronyism" published in The Guardian over his selection to an advisory role of lobbyists like George Pascoe-Watson, whose clients include the Boston Consulting Group "which has won several large government contracts during the pandemic."

In July 2021, Bethell was placed under investigation by the House of Lords Commissioner for Standards over a "complaint regarding Lord Bethell sponsoring a pass for Gina Coladangelo", who was a lobbyist and lover of the then Health secretary Matt Hancock.

In August 2021, it was reported that Bethell had replaced his mobile phone earlier that year and not transferred data from his previous phone, meaning that it could not be searched for messages related to an £85m contract with Abingdon Health that was subject to judicial review. In November 2021 he stated in a witness statement that three prior explanations he had given for why he could not access his messages – that he lost his phone, that his phone was defective and that he had given it to a relative – were incorrect and that he had deleted them because he incorrectly thought they were backed up.

On 17 September 2021, Lord Bethell left government during the second cabinet reshuffle of the second Johnson ministry.

In November 2021, it emerged that Lord Bethell had been part of a government meeting regarding a £600 million contract with Randox, the clinical diagnostics firm for which Owen Paterson was found to have breached parliamentary standards in which, against protocol, no minutes were taken.

In 2022 and 2023, he joined the Development Council of Sadler's Wells, and became Board Advisor to Plessey Semiconductors, Senior Advisor to the Milken Institute, and Board Member of Business for Health, a UK-based business-led coalition focused on workplace health and prevention. He has also served on the House of Lords Secondary Legislation Scrutiny Committee and as vice-chair of the All-Party Parliamentary Groups on Health and Swimming.

In June 2023, Bethell appeared on BBC Radio 4 to defend the government which was trying to prevent disclosure of Boris Johnson's WhatsApp messages to the COVID-19 inquiry and stated that no decisions were made in WhatsApp groups during the pandemic. In December 2023, after Michelle Mone admitted her involvement in PPE Medpro, Bethell posted a screenshot of a text message that Mone had sent him in 2020.

In March 2026, shortly after the House of Lords (Hereditary Peers) Bill was passed by both houses of parliament, Bethell wrote online that he was looking forward "to leaving the life of a parliamentarian".

Since leaving ministerial office, Bethell has continued to hold roles in health policy and public life. He co-hosts the podcast Prevention is the New Cure with former health minister Steve Brine, a programme in which the two former health ministers discuss health and politics. Bethell serves as Senior Counsel to Oviva UK Limited, a digital health company providing weight-management services in partnership with the NHS, including programmes involving GLP-1 weight-loss medication. He is a non-executive director of Regenerus Labs, a UK-based diagnostics company that provides functional and diagnostic testing services. He is a trustee of the Royal Society for Public Health, an independent UK health charity. He is a Senior Visiting Fellow in the Department of War Studies at King's College London. According to an official government advisory-appointments letter, the role has included research on the national-security implications of developments in the life sciences, including the dual-use risks of genomic research collaboration with China.

== Personal life ==
Bethell is married to Melissa Bethell (née Wong), a business executive who has served as a non-executive director of Tesco and Diageo. Lord and Lady Bethell have four children. He succeeded his father Nicholas as Baron Bethell in 2007.

Bethell is a member of the board of trustees of the International Centre for the Study of Radicalisation and Political Violence and a fellow of the Royal Society of Arts. He is a repeat participant in the London Marathon. Before the 2025 race, he was described as returning for his third consecutive TCS London Marathon and as the only peer participating that year.

Peerage of the United Kingdom
Preceded by Nicholas Bethell	Baron Bethell; 2007–present	Incumbent; Heir apparent: Jacob Bethell
Parliament of the United Kingdom
Preceded by The Lord Glentoran	Elected hereditary peer to the House of Lords under the House of Lords Act 1999; 2018–2026	Position abolished under the House of Lords (Hereditary Peers) Act 2026
