= 1945 Dissolution Honours =

British government recognitions

The 1945 Dissolution Honours List was issued on 7 June to mark the dissolution of the United Kingdom parliament prior to the 1945 general election.

The recipients of honours are displayed here as they were styled before their new honour, and arranged by honour, with classes (Knight, Knight Grand Cross, etc.) and then divisions (Military, Civil, etc.) as appropriate.

== Peers ==
=== Viscount ===
- The Right Honourable Christopher, Baron Addison FRCS Leader of the Labour Party in the House of Lords since 1940; for political and public services.
- The Right Honourable George Lambert MP Member of Parliament for South Molton 1891-1924 and since 1929; for political and public services.

=== Baron ===
- Captain The Right Honourable Harold Harington Balfour MC MP Minister Resident in West Africa since 1944. Parliamentary Under-Secretary of State for Air, May, 1938-1944. Member of Parliament for the Isle of Thanet since 1929.
- Colonel The Right Honourable Sir George Loyd Courthope Bt MC TD JP DL MP Parliamentary Forestry Commissioner, Member of Parliament for Rye since 1906.
- Lieutenant-Colonel The Right Honourable Sir Edward William Macleay Grigg KCMG KCVO DSO MC MP Minister Resident in the Middle East since 1944, Member of Parliament for Oldham, 1922-1925, and for Altrincham since-1933.
- The Right Honourable Sir Douglas Hewitt Hacking Bt OBE DL MP Member of Parliament for the Chorley division of Lancashire since 1918; for political and public services.
- William Frederick Jackson MP Member of Parliament for Brecon and Radnor since 1939, for political and public services.
- David John Kinsley Quibell JP MP Member of Parliament for the Brigg division of Lincolnshire, 1929-1931 and since 1935; for political and public services.
- Alexander George Walkden JP MP Member of Parliament for South Bristol, 1929-1931 and since 1935; for political and public services.

== Privy Councillor ==
The King appointed the following to His Majesty's Most Honourable Privy Council:

- Brigadier-General The Right Honourable Henry Page, Baron Croft CMG TD Parliamentary Under-Secretary of State for War since 1940.
- John James Lawson MP Member of Parliament for Chester-le-Street since 1919; for political and public services.
- Major James Milner MC TD DL MP Chairman of Ways and Means and Deputy-Speaker of the House of Commons, March 1943 to May 1945. Member of Parliament for South-East Leeds since 1929.
- Sir Geoffrey Hithersay Shakespeare Bt MP Member of Parliament for Wellingborough, 1922-1923, and for Norwich since 1929; for political and public services.
- William James Thorne CBE MP Member of Parliament for West Ham, South, 1906-1918, and for the Plaistow Division of West Ham since 1918; for political and public services.
- Henry Graham White MP Member of Parliament for Birkenhead, East, 1922-1924 and since 1929; for political and public services.

== Baronetcies ==
- Sir Reginald Blair JP DL MP Member of Parliament for Bow and Bromley, 1912-1922, and for Hendon since 1935; for political and public services.
- Alexander Galloway Erskine-Hill KC MP Member of Parliament for North Edinburgh since 1935; for political and public services.
- Sir Ernest Whittome Shepperson JP MP Member of Parliament for Leominster since 1922; for political and public services.
- Sir Robert Workman Smith JP MP Member of Parliament for Aberdeen and Kincardine, Central division, since 1924; for political and public services.

== Knight Bachelor ==
- Major Albert Newby Braithwaite DSO MC MP Member of Parliament for the Buckrose division of the East Riding of Yorkshire since 1926; for political and public services.
- David Owen Evans MP Member of Parliament for Cardiganshire since 1932; for political and public services.
- Walter Sydney Liddall CBE JP MP Member of Parliament for Lincoln since 1931; for political and public services.
- Lieutenant-Colonel John Mayhew TD JP DL MP Member of Parliament for East Ham, North, since 1931; for political and public services.
- Arthur Conrad Reed JP MP Member of Parliament for Exeter since 1931; for political and public services.

== The Most Excellent Order of the British Empire ==
=== Knight Commander of the Order of the British Empire (KBE) ===
Civilian Division

- Wing-Commander Archibald William Henry James MC MP Member of Parliament for Wellingborough since 1931; for political and public services.
- Captain Peter Drummond Macdonald MP Member of Parliament for the Isle of Wight since 1924; for political and public services.
- The Right Honourable Ben Smith MP Minister Resident in Washington for Supply, 1943-1945, Member of Parliament for the Rotherhithe division of Bermondsey, 1923-1931, and since 1935.

== Members of the Order of the Companions of Honour (CH) ==
- The Right Honourable Clement Richard Attlee MP Lord President of the Council, 1943-1945, Member of Parliament for the Limehouse division of Stepney since 1922.
- The Right Honourable Arthur Greenwood MP Member of Parliament for Nelson and Colne, 1922-1931, and for Wakefield since 1932.
