= Beauchamp baronets of Woodborough (1918) =

Extinct baronetcy

Escutcheon of the Beauchamp baronets of Woodborough

The Beauchamp baronetcy, of Woodborough in the County of Somerset, was created in the Baronetage of the United Kingdom on 4 October 1918 for Major Frank Beauchamp, an army officer and local politician. The title became extinct on the death of the 2nd baronet in 1983.

== Beauchamp baronets, of Woodborough (1918) ==
- Sir Frank Beachim Beauchamp, 1st Baronet (1866–1950)
- Sir Douglas Clifford Beauchamp, 2nd Baronet (1903–1983)
