= Westbourne Communications =

U.S. public relations firm

- Industry: Public relations
- Founder: James Bethell, 5th Baron Bethell
- Parent: Cicero Communications (from 2018)

Westbourne Communications is a public relations firm founded by James Bethell, 5th Baron Bethell.

In June 2018, the company was sold to Cicero Communications.

== Campaigns ==
=== Campaign for High Speed Rail ===
Westbourne was involved in creating Campaign for High Speed Rail, a group promoting the HS2 transit line in London, whose spokesperson was Lucy James, a Westbourne employee. Westbourne organized a conference in 2011, it was attended by Transport secretary Philip Hammond, at which rail companies were asked to contribute £10,000 each to the launch of the campaign. Westbourne chose not to emphasize the government's position that the project would speed transit times, instead seeking to redefine opposition for the £33 billion project in terms of "posh nimbys" in the Chilterns worried about hunting rights. Posters for the campaign asked people to choose between "their lawns or our jobs". The company toured northern working-class cities by bus, working with politicians and celebrities to promote the project. The efforts were praised by transport minister Simon Burns, and Lord Adonis.

The tactics were denounced by opposing group Spinwatch as "astroturfing", and cited as a case of the "triumph of vested interests and the power of their lobbying companies". Tactics described as "keeping a lid on protests" in a campaign involved a confrontational approach against the "insurgency tactics" of online campaigners. VICE quoted Bethell: "You've got to fight them on every street corner... You can't just sit and watch your opponents run around doing what they like. You’ve got to get out into the bush, using their tactics and being in their face." In comments made at a conference with U.S. high speed rail advocates in 2012, Westbourne had advised lobbyists to "pick off" opponents with "sniper-scope accuracy" and "shut them up" with aggressive rebuttal campaigns, which Bethell called an "exhausting but crucial" part of successful lobbying.

The role of the government in spending public money on the lobbying was criticized, with Westbourne receiving over £80,000 from HS2 Ltd, with an additional £84,480 spent for two Westbourne staff working on secondment to HS2 Ltd, and a further £24,000 paid to the firm by the Department for Transport. Another firm, Tomboy Films, was paid £86,000 to create two informational videos supporting the project.

=== Other campaigns ===
The company also conducted a "Nothing British" PR campaign against the British National Party, enlisting military figures to promote their cause, and launched "Doctors for Reform", organizing 1000 doctors to call for changes to the National Health Service. "Nothing British" is described as "a viral video campaign led by Westbourne Communications and hosted by The Sun to counter the rise of the BNP following their success in the 2009 European Parliamentary elections." It is described in a video featuring Simon Weston, one of four people profiled, as "a campaign against racism and extremism".
