= Butlin baronets =

Extinct baronetcy in the Baronetage of the United Kingdom

- Escutcheon of the Butlin baronets of Harley Street
- Creation: 1911
- Created by: George V
- First holder: Sir Henry Butlin, 1st Baronet
- Last holder: Sir Henry Guy Trentham Butlin, 2nd Baronet
- Extinction date: 1916
- Motto: Courage sans peur, courage without fear
- Arms: Argent a fess bezanty gules between three crescents gules
- Crest: On a billet fessways argent charged with two crescents in fess gules, a cornish chough rising proper

The Butlin baronetcy, of Harley Street in the Metropolitan Borough of St Marylebone, was a title in the Baronetage of the United Kingdom. It was created on 28 June 1911 for the physician Henry Butlin, considered the father of British head and neck surgery. The title became extinct on the death of the 2nd Baronet in 1916.

== Butlin baronets, of Harley Street (1911) ==
- Sir Henry Trentham Butlin, 1st Baronet (1845–1912)
- Sir Henry Guy Trentham Butlin, 2nd Baronet (1893–1916), left no heir.

Baronetage of the United Kingdom
Preceded by Beauchamp baronets	Butlin baronets of Harley Street; 28 June 1911	Succeeded by Coates baronets
