= John Mayhew (Conservative politician) =

British Member of Parliament

Lieutenant-Colonel Sir John Dixon Mayhew TD JP DL MP (2 October 1884 – 27 January 1954) was a British industrialist, army officer and Conservative Party politician.

He was the son of Horace Mayhew, of Broughton Hall, Flintshire and his first wife Mary Helena Mayhew (née Dixon). He was educated at King William's College on the Isle of Man. He was an agriculturist and industrialist, with large landholdings and interests in a number of companies.

In 1902 he was commissioned as an officer in the Denbighshire Hussars, a part-time yeomanry cavalry regiment. By 1913 he had been promoted to the rank of major. When the First World War broke out in 1914 the regiment was mobilised, and saw service on the western Front. The Denbighshire Hussars were converted to infantry as the 24th Battalion, Royal Welsh Fusiliers. Mayhew was wounded in action but stayed in active service, and was promoted to lieutenant-colonel in 1918.

After the war he acquired Clayton Priory near Burgess Hill in Sussex, and took an active interest of the farming of the estate. He subsequently moved to Newton Hall, Great Dunmow, Essex.

A Unionist in politics, Mayhew was selected by the Conservative Party to contest the Essex constituency of Harwich at the 1929 general election, but failed to be elected. Two years later a National Government of which the Conservatives were part, was formed. A general election was called and Mayhew was selected to be the Conservative and Government candidate at East Ham North. The government won a large majority and Mayhew was elected to the Commons, unseating the Labour Party MP, Susan Lawrence. He was re-elected at the 1935 general election.

During the Second World War Mayhew acted as an army welfare officer, and he was knighted in the 1945 Dissolution Honours List. He attempted to defend his parliamentary seat at 1945 general election, but was heavily defeated as the Labour Party won a landslide victory. His opponent, Percy Daines, gained a majority of more than 10,000 votes.

Mayhew married Guendolen Gurney, of Blaenau Hall, Merionethshire in 1907. They had two sons, and she died in 1946. In 1950 his oldest son, John de Parigault Gurney Mayhew, issued divorce proceedings against his wife. He alleged that she had committed adultery with his father on a number of occasions between 1947 and 1949, and Sir John was forced to give testimony. His evidence was accepted and costs were awarded against his son.

Mayhew died suddenly in January 1954, aged 69.

Parliament of the United Kingdom
Preceded by Susan Lawrence	Member of Parliament for East Ham North; 1931–1945	Succeeded by Percy Daines
