= Trevor Kavanagh =

English journalist and political commentator

Trevor Michael Thomas Kavanagh (born 19 January 1943) is an English journalist and political commentator. He is best known for his long career at The Sun, where he served as political editor from 1983 to 2005 and later as associate editor. He retired in July 2024 after covering the United Kingdom general election but has since returned to the paper as a columnist.

== Early life and career ==
Kavanagh was born in Southall, Middlesex, and educated at Reigate Grammar School.

He left school at 17 to work for newspapers in Surrey and later Hereford. In 1965, he emigrated to Australia, working on several newspapers. After a short stint back in the United Kingdom with the Bristol Evening Post, he returned to Australia to work on the political desk of the Daily Mirror in Sydney.

== Career ==
In 1978, he returned to the United Kingdom permanently, joining the news desk of The Sun. He became industrial correspondent in 1980 and political editor in 1983.

In January 2004, Kavanagh published details of the Hutton Inquiry before its official release, based on information from an anonymous source.

He covered his last UK general election as political editor in May 2005. Later that year, it was announced he would become associate editor of The Sun. His successor as political editor was his deputy, George Pascoe-Watson.

In December 2015, Kavanagh joined the board of the Independent Press Standards Organisation (IPSO). He left the board in December 2017 after two years.

=== Parliamentary press roles ===
He served as Chairman of the House of Commons Press Gallery in 1999–2000. He was also chairman of the Lobby journalists.

=== Awards and recognition ===
- British Press Awards — Journalist of the Year (1997).
- British Press Awards — Specialist Reporter/Journalist of the Year (1997).
- What the Papers Say — Scoop of the Year (2000).
- What the Papers Say — Scoop of the Year (2004), for his Hutton report story.
- Political Studies Association — Political Journalist of the Year (2004).
- Foreign Press Association (London) — Print Story of the Year (2004).

Note: The What the Papers Say Scoop of the Year (2002) went to the Mail on Sunday and Daily Mail for the "Cheriegate" revelations, not to Kavanagh.

== Controversies ==
In February 2017, IPSO upheld a complaint against a column by Kavanagh about allegedly false refugee claims, describing the piece as "significantly misleading".

In August 2017, he wrote a controversial Sun column referring to "The Muslim Problem", citing Labour MP Sarah Champion’s article the previous week. The phrasing drew comparisons to Nazi-era language and led to a joint complaint by several faith groups, as well as a cross-party letter of protest signed by over 100 MPs.

== Articles ==
- The new politics of decline. The Spectator. 311 (9446): 14–15. 12 September 2009.
- Lifeblood of Democracy – Is Freedom of the Press Safe in Keir Starmer’s Hands?. Free Speech Union, April 2025.

== Personal life ==
Kavanagh is married and lives in London. He has two sons and three grandchildren. In July 2022, during an appearance on TalkTV, he stated that he holds an Australian passport which he might use "if Sadiq Khan becomes prime minister".
