= Frank Beauchamp =

British industrialist (1866–1950)

Colonel Sir Frank Beachim Beauchamp, 1st Baronet CBE (born Mells, Somerset 1866, died Worthing, West Sussex, 17 June 1950) was an industrialist who owned mines in the Somerset coalfield, notably in Midsomer Norton and Radstock. He was the first baronet of the Beauchamp Baronetcy of Woodborough, in the County of Somerset, created for him in 1918. He was also a Conservative county councillor for thirty-nine years.

== Early and personal life ==
He was born in 1866 in Mells, Somerset where he was educated privately. He grew up at Norton Hall (formerly Norton Down House), a now-demolished mansion in Midsomer Norton. His father, also involved in coalmines, was William Beauchamp, and his sister Rose was the sister-in-law of the composer and music administrator Sir Reginald Thatcher.

In 1897 he married Mabel Constance Bannon whose photographic portrait is part of the Lafayette Negative Archive at the Victoria & Albert Museum in London. They had four children including Sir Douglas Clifford Beauchamp, the second and last Beauchamp baronet, and Irene Mabel.

== Adult life and career ==
He was a magistrate, a Conservative member of Somerset County Council from 1907 to 1946 and a Parliamentary candidate in 1910. In May 1915 he joined the army and after eighteen months in Britain he went to the US in an advisory capacity to the War Department in Washington D.C. He reached the rank of colonel and was created a baronet in 1918 and appointed a CBE in 1919. Sir Frank's business interests were centred on Radstock and Midsomer Norton where he owned a number of collieries, a coal distribution business, a wagon works and a gasworks. He was a partner with his brother Louis in the Norton Hill colliery in Midsomer Norton, chairman of the East Bristol colliery company and director of the Somerset colliery company.

In 1926 he was named High Sheriff of Somerset

He lived at Woodborough House, a now-demolished mansion between Peasedown St John and Radstock, Somerset.

== Later life and death ==
Due to ill health he spent his final years in Worthing, West Sussex, where he died on 17 June 1950. He is buried in the churchyard of St Peter's Church, Camerton, Somerset.

Baronetage of the United Kingdom
New creation	Baronet (of Woodborough); 1918–1950	Succeeded by Douglas Beauchamp
