= 1957 East Ham North by-election =

UK Parliamentary by-election

The 1957 East Ham North by-election of 30 May 1957 was held following the death of Labour Party MP Percy Daines.

The seat was safe, having been won at the 1955 general election by over 5,500 votes

== Result of the previous general election ==
General election 1955: East Ham North
| Party | Candidate | Votes | % | ±% |
|---|---|---|---|---|
| Labour | Percy Daines | 17,961 | 59.13 | −1.23 |
| Conservative | A Silverstone | 12,416 | 40.87 | +1.23 |
| Majority | | 5,545 | 18.26 | −2.45 |
| Turnout | | 30,377 | 74.92 | −8.36 |
| Conservative hold | | Swing | -1.23 | |

== Result of the by-election ==
By-election 1957: East Ham North
| Party | Candidate | Votes | % | ±% |
|---|---|---|---|---|
| Labour | Reg Prentice | 12,546 | 56.26 | −2.87 |
| Conservative | John Henry Samuel Bangay | 6,567 | 29.45 | −11.42 |
| People's League | Edward Martell | 2,730 | 12.24 | New |
| Ind. Labour Party | William Henry Christopher | 458 | 2.05 | New |
| Majority | | 5,979 | 26.81 | +8.56 |
| Turnout | | 22,301 | 57.30 | −17.62 |
| Labour hold | | Swing | +4.28 | |
