= Controversies regarding COVID-19 contracts in the United Kingdom =

In response to the COVID-19 pandemic in the United Kingdom, the British government decided in March 2020 to rapidly place contracts and recruit a number of individuals. Shortages of personal protective equipment (PPE) were a particular political issue for the second Johnson ministry. This led to the awarding of a number of contracts without a competitive tendering process, and friends of political figures and people who had made political donations were quickly given contracts.

As a result, accusations of cronyism were made against the Conservative government, and in September 2024 the new Labour government announced a commissioner would be appointed and investigations begun into any criminal activity.

== Shortages of PPE and equipment ==
Since the 2007 H5N1 influenza outbreak, National Health Service (NHS) trusts had conducted simulations of influenza-like pandemics. Russell King, an NHS resilience manager, said; "the Cabinet Office had identified the availability and distribution of PPE [personal protective equipment] as a pinch point in a pandemic".

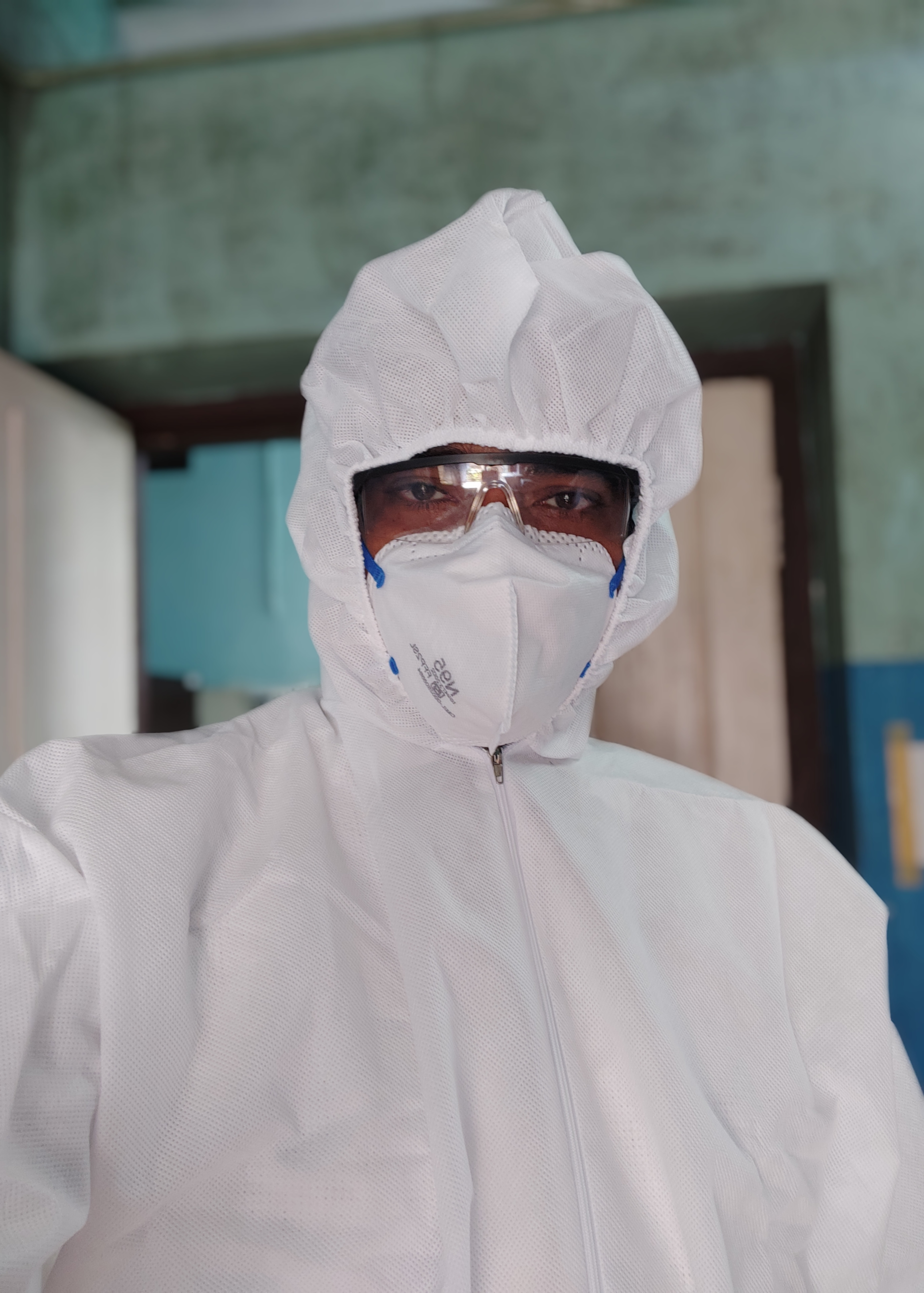
A doctor wearing PPE to prevent exposure to COVID-19

Early in the COVID-19 pandemic, the government was criticised for the lack of PPE available to NHS workers, and there was pressure to quickly supply such PPE. The UK government said it did not take part in an 8 April bid for €1.5bn (£1.3bn) worth of PPE by members of the European Union (EU), or any bids under the EU Joint Procurement Agreement, which was set up in 2014 after the H1N1 influenza pandemic because the UK had left the EU. The agreement allows EU countries to purchase as a bloc, securing the best prices and allowing quick procurement at a time of shortages. Under the terms of the Brexit withdrawal agreement, the UK government had the right to take part in the bid until 31 December 2020.

In March 2020, the government called for British industry to manufacture medical ventilators for the NHS. Dyson and Babcock revealed plans to manufacture 30,000 ventilators, a number seen as necessary based on modelling from China. The "ventilator challenge" involved companies such as Airbus, Rolls-Royce and Ford. Company sources later told The Guardian this was known to be impractical at the time; the ventilators suggested by the government were crude and would not have been able to be used in hospitals. None of the companies involved reached the final stages of testing and most were ultimately, superfluous.

The Doctors' Association UK said on 31 March 2020 shortages were covered up with intimidating emails, threats of disciplinary action and, in two cases, doctors being sent home from work. Some doctors were disciplined after managers were annoyed by material they had posted online about the shortages. Speaking to Nafeez Ahmed in April, former World Health Organization (WHO) employee Anthony Costello said; "We simply don't have enough PPE. Not enough visors, not enough N95 respirators. [The] government is not following WHO guidelines."

On 18 April, Robert Jenrick reported 400,000 protective gowns and other PPE were on their way to the UK from Turkey. One day later, they were delayed, leading hospital leaders to criticise the government for the first time since the pandemic began. The shipment arrived at Istanbul airport en route to the UK two days after ministers said the PPE would reach the UK. Only 32,000 gowns arrived—less than one-tenth of the order—despite the NHS making a down payment to secure their arrival on 22 April. The PPE shipment was ultimately returned to Turkey because it did not meet NHS standards. In May, it was learnt almost half of England's doctors sourced their own PPE or relied on donations when none was available through normal NHS channels.

== Bypassing the open call for bids ==
According to Byline Times, the UK usually publishes an open call for bids to provide PPE in the Official Journal of the European Union. The newspaper said according to EU directives, the government does not have to open up a contract to competition when there is an "extreme urgency" to buy goods or services, and can directly approach companies. During the COVID-19 pandemic, the Department of Health and Social Care (DHSC), local NHS bodies and other government agencies directly approached firms to provide services, bypassing the EU's tendering process—in some cases without a "call for competition". According to Byline Times, emergency procurement procedures under regulation 32(2)(c) of the Public Contract Regulations 2015, which allows for the sourcing of goods without a formal tendering process, were invoked. On 19 February 2021, the High Court of Justice ruled the government had violated the law by not publishing contract awards within 30 days.

=== Tendering-process concerns ===
The National Audit Office (NAO) said £10.5 billion of the overall £18 billion spent on pandemic-related contracts (58 per cent) was awarded directly to suppliers without competitive tender, with PPE accounting for 80 per cent of the contracts. The UK government was competing with governments worldwide and, to satisfy the unprecedented demand for PPE, had awarded contracts hastily and bypassed normal competitive tendering processes to secure supplies. As a result of the NAO report, the Good Law Project advocacy group opened a number of cases against the DHSC. The Good Law Project questioned the awarding of PPE contracts worth over £250 million to Michael Saiger, who headed an American jewellery company and had no experience in supplying PPE; the contracts involved a £21 million payment to intermediary Gabriel González Andersson. The contract was not advertised and there was no competitive tender process.

Transparency International UK found one-fifth of the contracts "raised red flags for possible corruption". A fast-track "VIP lane", which awarded funding at a rate 10 times higher than other routes, prioritised Conservative Party donors and others connected with the party. According to a leaked document from the Good Law Project on 16 November 2021 that was published before its planned official release by the government, 47 companies were referred to this route. Michael Gove referred Meller Designs, which received £164m in PPE contracts, and Liaoning Zhongqiao Overseas Exchange Co, which received a $15m contract for PPE, to this route. A spokesperson for Gove said the referral was not improper. Matt Hancock referred Excalibur Healthcare, which received contracts worth £135.4m; Nine United, which received a contract worth £80.7m; and Monarch Acoustics, which received a contract worth £28.8m. Lord Chadlington and Lord Feldman referred SG Recruitment which received £79.6m of contracts; Skinnydip Ltd, which received a contract worth £12.8m; and Maxima Markets, which received a contract worth £1.85m. Feldman told The Guardian he had no previous knowledge of the companies or commercial relationship with their owners, and that the companies were referred to him by third parties, and he had no knowledge they became fast-tracked. Lord Agnew referred Uniserve–one of the largest recipients of non-open tender pandemic agreements that received eight contracts worth £876m; Worldlink Resource, which received £258m of contracts; and Euthenia Investments, which received a contract worth £880,000). The Cabinet Office said Agnew had been referring companies that approached his office. Uniserve said the DHSC had approached it directly and that it had no connections with Agnew. Michelle Mone is listed as referring PPE Medpro, which received two contracts worth £202.8m; in 2020, Mone's lawyers had told The Guardian she did not have "any role or function in PPE Medpro, nor in the process by which contracts were awarded to PPE Medpro".

According to The Sunday Times, the government gave £1.5 billion to companies that are linked to the Conservative Party. Although the NAO said there was "no evidence" ministers were "involved in either the award or management of the contracts", companies that had links to government ministers, politicians and health officials were put in a high-priority channel that was fast-tracked; those in it were ten times more likely to win a contract. In an opinion piece, BBC economics correspondent Andrew Verity said there was an increased risk contracts would be seen to be "awarded not on merit or value for money but because of personal connections" when fast-tracking occurs.

A landmark study revealed widespread corruption risks in UK government Covid contracts worth over £15 billion, accounting for nearly a third of pandemic-related spending. The investigation, conducted by Transparency International UK, found systemic issues such as lack of competition, opaque accounting, and conflicts of interest in over 135 contracts. Political connections and the controversial VIP lane were flagged, with £1 billion wasted on unusable PPE. Despite the urgency of the pandemic, the report criticized the government's overreliance on non-competitive procurement, leading to significant waste. Labour pledged a Covid corruption commissioner to investigate the £7.6 billion lost to fraud and mismanagement.

=== Alleged cronyism ===
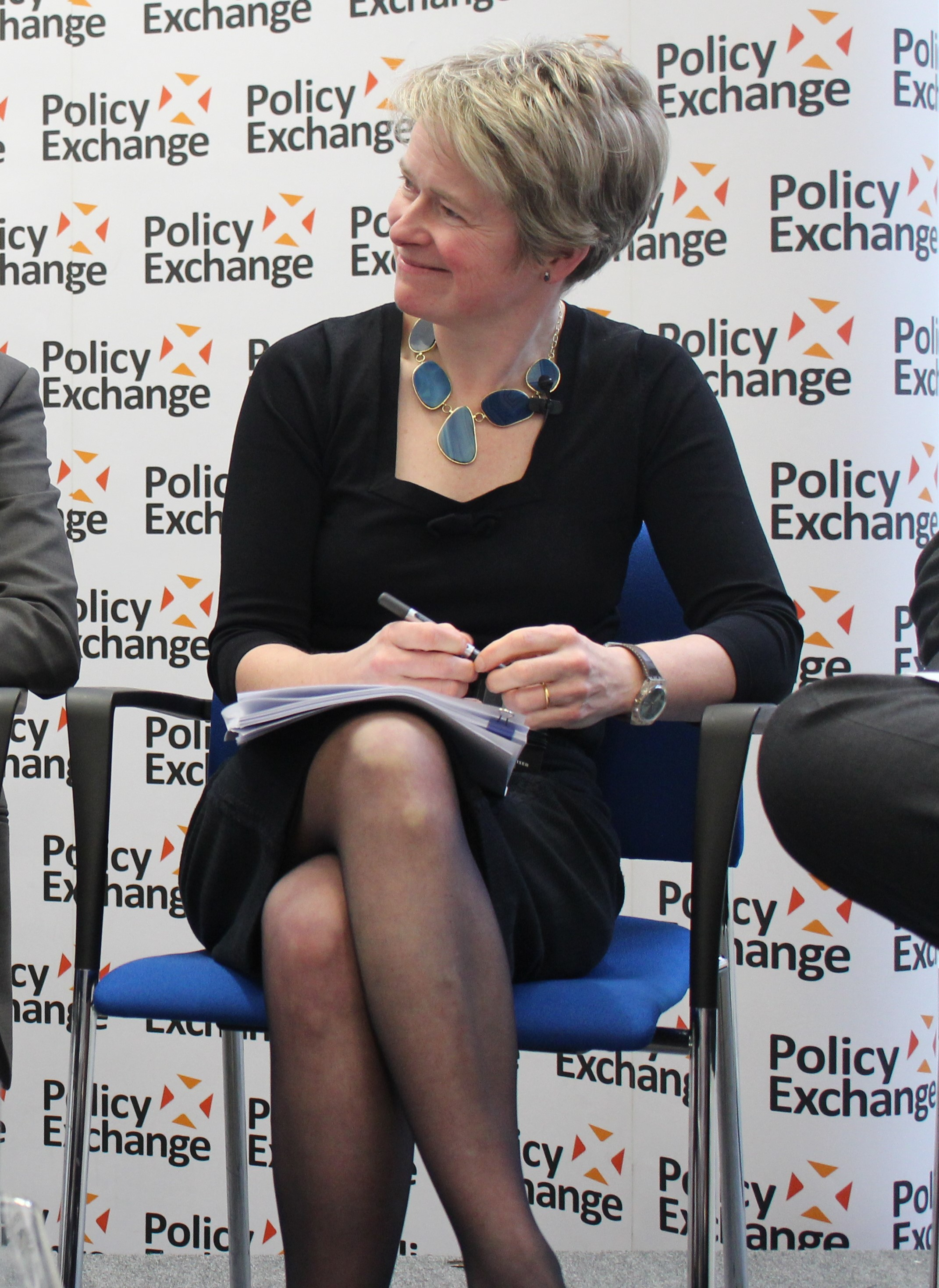
The Baroness Harding, a Tory peer, was appointed to run NHS Test and Trace, leading to accusations of cronyism

The Baroness Harding, a Conservative peer and the wife of Conservative MP John Penrose, was appointed to run NHS Test and Trace, until the establishment of the UK Health Security Agency in April 2021. Harding's appointment was also seen as controversial due to her involvement in organising the Cheltenham Festival, an annual horse-racing event in early March whose 2020 edition was alleged to be a possible early superspreading event. In October 2020, Mike Coupe, a friend of Harding, took a three-month appointment as head of infection testing at NHS Test and Trace. The Good Law Project and the Runnymede Trust brought a legal case that alleged Prime Minister Boris Johnson acted unlawfully in securing the two contracts, and had chosen the recipients because of their connections to the Conservative Party; As of June 2021, the case was still ongoing, although previous action over Kate Bingham's non-competitive appointment as head of the vaccine taskforce was dropped. A spokesman for the government told The Guardian; "We do not comment on ongoing legal proceedings."

The DHSC appointed George Pascoe-Watson, chair of Portland Communications, to an unpaid advisory position and he participated in daily strategic discussions that were chaired by Lord Bethell. Pascoe-Watson sent information about government policy to his clients before it was made public. Conservative peer Lord O'Shaughnessy was paid as an "external adviser" to the DHSC when he was a paid adviser to Portland Communications. In May 2020, O'Shaughnessy participated in a call with Bethell and Boston Consulting Group (BCG), a Portland client that received £21 million in contracts on the COVID-19 testing system. BCG management consultants were paid up to £6,250 per day to help reorganise the Test and Trace system.

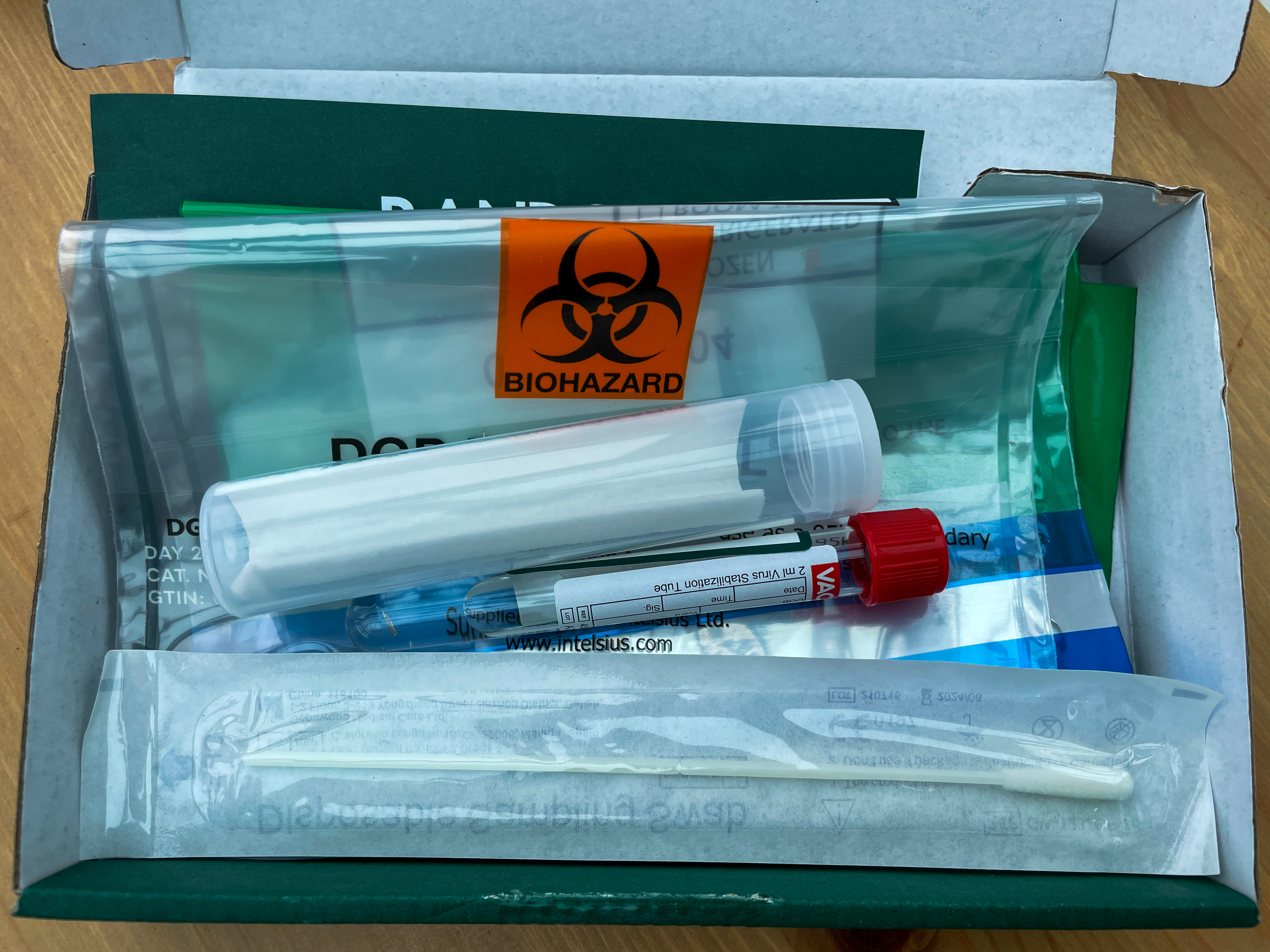
A Randox PCR home test kit in the UK, showing the swab, and multi-layer packaging to deliver it to the lab

Other allegations of cronyism include:

- Faculty, which worked with Dominic Cummings for Vote Leave during the Brexit referendum, has received government contracts since 2018. After Boris Johnson became prime minister, Cummings recruited Ben Warner, a former Faculty employee who worked on Vote Leave, to work with him in Downing Street.
- Hanbury Strategy, a policy and lobbying consultancy, was paid £648,000 for two contracts: one that was awarded under the emergency procedures to research "public attitudes and behaviours" in relation to the pandemic, and one, at a level not requiring a tender, to conduct weekly polling. The company was co-founded by Paul Stephenson, director of communications for Vote Leave and a contender for the post Downing Street Chief of Staff. In March 2019, Hanbury was tasked with assessing job applications for Conservative special advisers.
- Gina Coladangelo, a close friend of Matt Hancock with no-known health background, was paid £15,000 as a non-executive director of the DHSC on a six-month contract; Coladangelo accompanied Hancock to confidential meetings with civil servants although there was no public record of the appointment. She received a parliamentary pass sponsored by Bethell, although she is not part of Bethell's team. Coladangelo resigned from her position after it was revealed she and Hancock were having an extramarital affair.
- According to The Guardian, Alex Bourne, a former neighbour and owner of the Cock Inn public house, which is near Hancock's constituency home, received a contract that involved supplying "tens of millions of vials for NHS Covid-19 tests".

=== PPE and equipment contracts ===
In April 2020, Ayanda Capital, a Mauritius-based investment firm with no prior public-health experience, received a £252 million contract to supply face masks. The contract included an order for 50 million high-strength FFP2 medical masks that did not meet NHS standards because they had elastic ear loops instead of the required straps that tie behind the wearer's head. According to the company, they adhered to the specifications they were given. Andrew Mills, an adviser to the Board of Trade–a branch of Liz Truss's Department for International Trade–whose involvement was criticised by the Good Law Project, arranged the contract. According to the DIT, neither it nor the Board of Trade was involved in the deal.

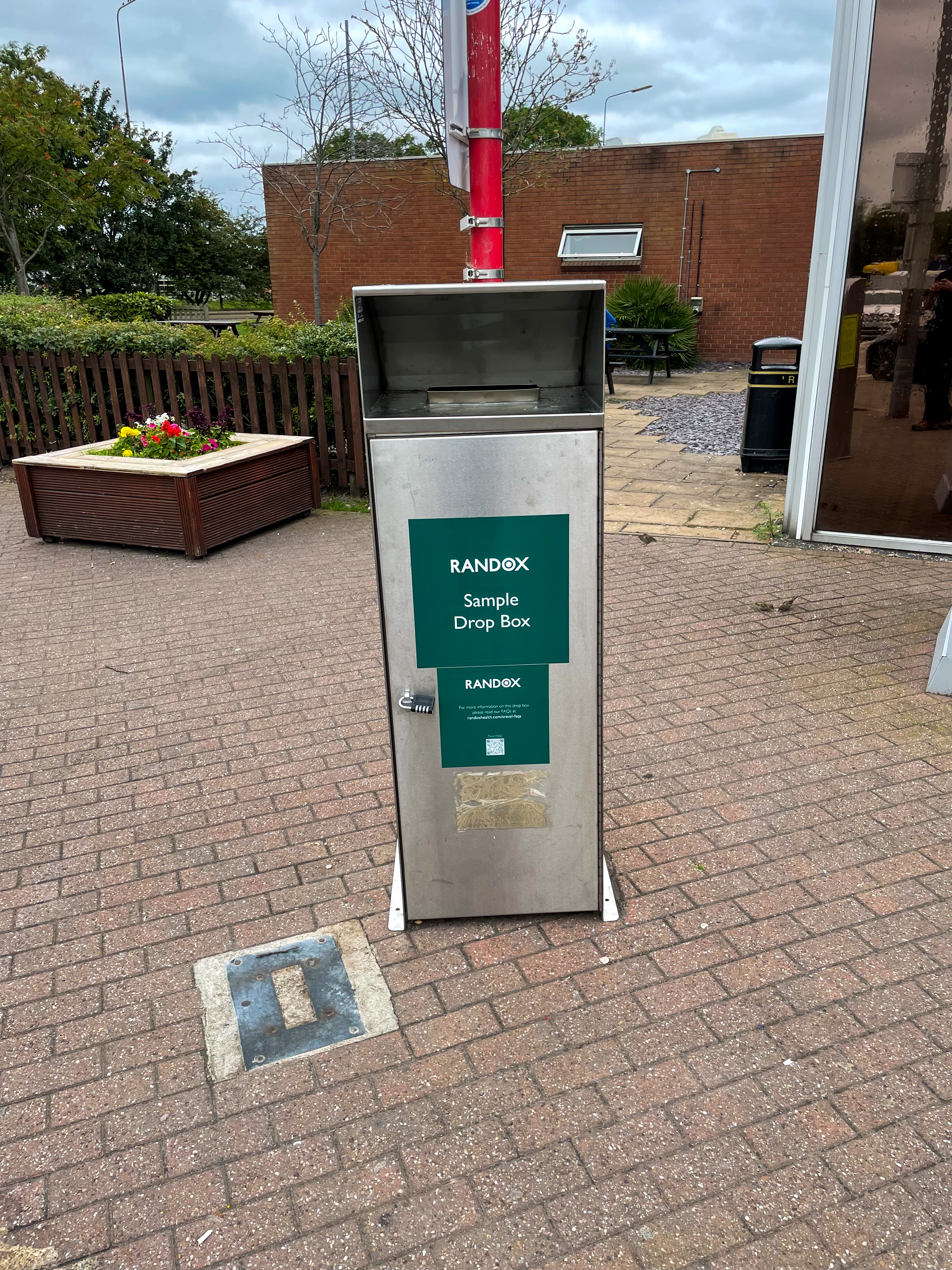
A Randox sample drop box

Former Chairman of the Conservative Party Lord Feldman was appointed as an unpaid adviser to Conservative peer Lord Bethell. Feldman was present when Bethell awarded Meller Designs, which is owned by David Meller, who gave £63,000 to the Conservative Party–mostly when Feldman was chair–£163 million in contracts for PPE on 6 April. Three days later, Conservative MP and former Secretary of State for Northern Ireland Owen Paterson participated in a telephone call with Bethell and Randox Laboratories, who pay Paterson £100,000 a year as a consultant. The Grand National, the biggest sporting event of the Jockey Club, whose executive board Harding and Paterson's late wife Rose sat on, is sponsored by Randox, who received £479 million in testing contracts. Orders continued after Randox had to recall 500,000 tests because of safety concerns. During the Owen Paterson lobbying scandal, it was reported in March 2020 Randox was awarded a £133 million contract from the DHSC to produce testing kits at a cost of £49 each with no other firms being given the opportunity to bid for the work. Six months later, a further £347 million contract was awarded to Randox without other companies being able to bid.

One of the largest government PPE contracts went to Crisp Websites (trading as PestFix), a business specialising in supplying PPE to protect users from airborne chemicals in pest-control settings. In April 2020, PestFix secured a contract with the DHSC for a £32 million batch of isolation suits; three months after the contract was signed, suits from PestFix were not released for use in the NHS because they were in an NHS supply-chain warehouse awaiting safety assessments. The Health and Safety Executive (HSE) concluded supplies of PPE had not been specified to the correct standard for use in hospitals when they were bought. That June, an email from a firm working with the HSE in June said there was " 'political' pressure" to get the suits through the quality-assurance process. The gowns were approved for use and released to hospitals during mid-2020; HSE chief executive Sarah Albon said claims her organisation was under 'political' pressure to approve PPE were untrue.

In a 25 November 2020 letter, Albon wrote: "At no time in the management of PPE supply have any HSE staff indicated that there were feelings of pressure being applied to make specific decisions, to change decisions, or to accept lower standards than required of PPE". According to Albon, technical assessments sometimes had to be repeated; the gowns' release to hospitals after failing the first inspection did not mean they were unsuitable or unsafe; saying: "In such cases HSE may have asked the supply chain to obtain further information, or to arrange for further testing, to verify the product. In these cases, products that initially had insufficient or incorrect information provided may have been subsequently reassessed and agreed for supply when those gaps had been addressed." The contract was challenged in the courts by the Good Law Project, which asked why the DHSC had agreed to pay 75 per cent in advance when the provider was "wholly unsuited" to deliver such a large and important order. The Good Law Project discovered the company had been awarded PPE contracts worth £313 million.

=== PPE Medpro controversy ===
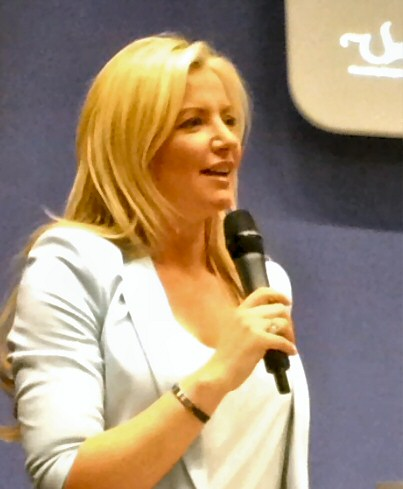
It was reported that Michelle Mone, Baroness Mone (pictured in 2013) and her children had secretly received £29 million of profits to an offshore trust from government PPE contracts, which she had lobbied for during the COVID-19 pandemic. The House of Lords Commissioner for Standards and National Crime Agency launched investigations into Mone's links to these contracts in January 2022.

In October 2020 it was revealed that PPE Medpro, a company led by Anthony Page, a business associate of Michelle Mone, Baroness Mone and her husband Doug Barrowman, had been awarded a contract for £122 million to supply personal protective equipment (PPE) to the NHS during the COVID-19 pandemic. Page resigned as secretary for MGM Media, the company that manages and receives payment for Mone's branding and media engagements and on the same day he formed Medpro. In October 2020, a spokeswoman for Mone stated she "has no role or involvement in PPE Medpro", adding: "Mr Barrowman is also not involved in the company PPE Medpro and is not a Director or Shareholder." It later emerged that a second contract for £80 million was awarded to Medpro even earlier when the company was just 4 weeks old.

In November 2021, a Freedom of Information request revealed that Mone personally recommended the company to the government through its VIP fast-track lane for firms with political connections and that the company was awarded £200 million in government contracts. This high-priority process was set up in the early stages of the COVID-19 pandemic in order to bypass the normal competitive tender process for procurement that was considered urgent. It further emerged in January 2022 that Mone recommended Medpro for a government contract five days before the company had been formed. At the time, Mone's lawyers stated that she "was not connected to PPE Medpro in any capacity" but documents leaked to The Guardian revealed that a director of the company was a long term employee of Mone's husband's company. WhatsApp messages seen by The Guardian appeared to show Mone discussing the size of garments that formed part of a contract. Lawyers for Mone and her husband denied the allegations.

Following a complaint by the Labour peer George Foulkes, the House of Lords commissioner for standards launched an investigation into the relationship between Mone and Medpro in January 2022. On 27 April 2022, Mone's homes in London and on the Isle of Man and associated business addresses were raided by the police, who have launched an investigation into potential fraud. The National Crime Agency is pursuing a tandem investigation into PPE Medpro.

In November 2022, The Guardian reported that an Isle of Man trust, of which Mone and her adult children are beneficiaries, had received £29 million originating from PPE Medpro via a series of offshore transactions involving Barrowman. Her lawyer had previously said she did not declare PPE Medpro in the House of Lords register of financial interests as "she did not benefit financially and was not connected to PPE Medpro in any capacity."

Mone also lobbied for LFI Diagnostics, a company established as a secret entity of her husband Barrowman's family office, Knox family office. An unnamed source told The Guardian that Mone was "in a class of her own in terms of the sheer aggression of her advocacy" for LFI Diagnostics. On 6 December 2022, Mone's spokesperson said she was taking a leave of absence from the House of Lords with immediate effect "in order to clear her name of the allegations that have been unjustly levelled against her."

On 19 December 2022 it emerged that the government would sue PPE Medpro for £122m plus costs. The government said that medical gowns which were supplied by the company "did not comply with the specification in the contract" and could not be used in the NHS. PPE Medpro said it would "rigorously" defend the claim.

== See also ==
- British government response to the COVID-19 pandemic
- Downing Street refurbishment controversy
- United Kingdom parliamentary second jobs controversy
