= Percy Daines =

British insurance agent and politician (1902–1957)

Percy Daines (29 November 1902 – 3 March 1957) was a British insurance agent and politician. He served as a Labour and Co-operative Party Member of Parliament for East Ham North from the 1945 general election until his death, and was on the national committee of the Co-operative Party. He was known for his opposition to Communism, and was described as "one of the most powerful back-benchers in the Labour Party".

== Insurance agent ==
Daines' early career was spent as a fireman on the railways. In 1921 he became an insurance official working for the Co-operative Insurance Society; as such he was a member of both the National Union of Railwaymen and the National Union of Distributive and Allied Workers. Daines married his wife Lilian in 1923.

During the Second World War, Daines served with the Royal Engineers. He also became a member of Enfield Urban District Council. His wife was also a councillor in Enfield and later became chairman of the council.

== East Ham North ==
He was chosen as Labour Party candidate for East Ham North for the 1945 general election, and was sponsored by the Co-operative Party which was the political wing of the Co-operative movement and in alliance with the Labour Party. The constituency was held by the Conservatives with a narrow majority of 533, but in the circumstances of the election Daines had no difficulty in gaining the seat with a majority of 10,559.

Daines spoke in a censure debate in December 1945, arguing that workers had shown unity during the war and would show it in peace if they had a social motive instead of a profit motive. He often contributed to debates on insurance issues, using his experience as an agent. In July 1946 he spoke in a debate on the introduction of bread rationing, claiming that the Master Bakers' Association was only opposing out of concern for their own profits.

== Assistant Whip ==
In December 1946, Daines was appointed an Assistant Whip. This was an unpaid position, and did not prevent him from speaking in the House of Commons. He was a loyal supporter of a controversial decision to reduce the period of the National Service in the armed forces from 18 months to 12, in a speech in April 1947. However, he resigned his post as Assistant Whip just before the summer recess of that year. He remained loyal to the government when a fellow Labour MP opposed an order which allowed the Government to choose which jobs the unemployed should take; he look forward to further orders "dealing with rentiers and spivs".

== Capital punishment ==
On foreign policy, Daines joined a group of left-wing Labour MPs in opposing the ending of the British mandate in Palestine without creating independent Jewish and Arab states in line with the United Nations partition plan. He supported a moratorium on capital punishment, and broke the whip to insist on disagreement with the House of Lords after the Government conceded to Lords opposition; he was later to be a sponsor of Sydney Silverman's bill to abolish the death penalty.

Daines was a witness in a 1948 libel action brought by Bessie Braddock over a story in the Bolton Evening News claiming she had "danced a jig on the floor of the House" in "a sorry degradation of democratic government"; he said that Braddock appeared to cross the floor of the House reluctantly (Braddock lost the case). He asserted that he was speaking for the Co-operative movement in April 1949 when he opposed the Agricultural Marketing Bill, which he described as 'capitalist-syndicalist'. Daines supported an amendment to remove the veto of the Parliament of Northern Ireland on eventual reunification of Ireland in May 1949, against the Government whip.

== Dock strike ==
With a constituency near the docks, Daines was brought into the 1949 unofficial dock strike. He denounced the strike as the product of a "wicked conspiracy cleverly rigged up", making it clear that the conspiracy was the work of the Communists. A week later he named the Communist secretary of the stevedore's union as using the power of the strike to further the claims of the Communist-controlled Canadian Seamen's Union.

== Resale price maintenance ==
In June 1950, Daines seconded a motion calling for an end to resale price maintenance, arguing that price maintenance stopped the consumer benefiting from reduced production. He was an early supporter of reform of Parliamentary hours, speaking in July 1951 of how "fantastic and stupid" it was to discuss essential legislation at 7'o'clock in the morning.

He faced a determined opponent at the 1951 election in the shape of Dundas Hamilton who had been an amateur boxer and wore boxing gloves to his adoption meeting. However, Daines was re-elected with his majority reduced to 7,359. In October 1952 he had some negative publicity when his wife obtained a decree nisi of divorce against him on grounds of his misconduct.

== Foreign policy ==
At the 1953 Co-operative Party congress, Daines warned delegates against getting themselves into a "Munich mentality" which was thought to have helped persuade the congress to reject a motion calling for the abolition of national service. He spoke in a foreign policy debate in May 1953 regretting the tendency to anti-Americanism in the Labour Party, and said that the death of Stalin had not changed the policy of the Soviet Union. Daines was incensed when a Ministry of Defence booklet was published in February 1955 which revealed that British Communists had visited prisoner of war camps during the Korean War, and attempted to convert British troops to communism. He urged their prosecution, observing that men had been hanged for lesser crimes after the Second World War.

== Kim Philby ==
When fellow Labour MP Marcus Lipton used Parliamentary privilege to name Kim Philby as the 'third man' in the spy ring involving Guy Burgess and Donald Maclean, Daines was concerned. He intervened on a speech by Lipton in the House of Commons on 7 November 1955 to observe that what Lipton had done was "tantamount to a charge against that gentleman" and ask him for the source of his information. Lipton declined to respond, and Daines then raised a point of order insisting that Philby was unable to defend himself and that Lipton "owes it to the House to give the source of his information, or should withdraw the charge".

== Suez ==
Despite his opposition to the Soviet Union, Daines felt that the invasion of Suez was stopped by the ascendancy of the Soviets in the Middle East. He called on Prime Minister Anthony Eden to resign as he was discredited in America. Daines died suddenly in hospital at Southend in March 1957, aged 54.

Parliament of the United Kingdom
Preceded by Sir John Mayhew	Member of Parliament for East Ham North; 1945 – 1957	Succeeded by Reg Prentice
