= PestFix =

British company that participated in the "VIP lane" PPE program

Crisp Websites Limited, trading as PestFix, is a British company that participated in the "VIP lane" program for the supply of personal protective equipment during the COVID-19 epidemic in the United Kingdom. It was granted contracts worth £108m.
