= East Ham North =

Parliamentary constituency in the United Kingdom, 1918–1974

- Former borough constituency for the House of Commons
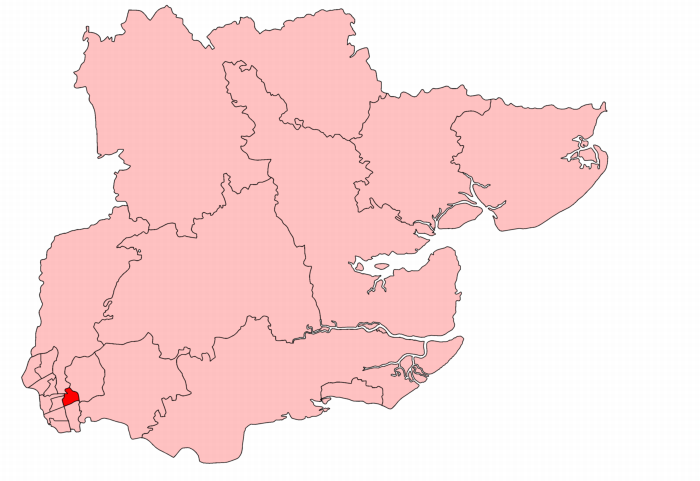
- East Ham North within Essex from 1918 to 1950
- County: 1918–1965: Essex; 1965–1974: Greater London

1918–1974
- Seats: One
- Created from: Romford
- Replaced by: Newham North East

East Ham North was a parliamentary constituency centred on the East Ham district of London, which was in Essex until 1965. It returned one Member of Parliament (MP) to the House of Commons of the Parliament of the United Kingdom, elected by the first past the post voting system.

== History ==
The constituency was created by the Representation of the People Act 1918 for the 1918 general election. It was abolished for the February 1974 general election.

== Boundaries ==
1918–1950: The County Borough of East Ham wards of Manor Park, Plashet East, and Plashet West.

1950–1974: The County Borough of East Ham wards of Kensington, Little Ilford, Manor Park, Plashet, and Woodgrange.

== Members of Parliament ==
Sir John Bethell

Election	Member	Party
1918	John Bethell	Liberal
1922	Charles Williamson Crook	Conservative
1923	Susan Lawrence	Labour
1924	Charles Williamson Crook	Conservative
1926 by-election	Susan Lawrence	Labour
1931	John Mayhew	Conservative
1945	Percy Daines	Labour Co-operative
1957 by-election	Reg Prentice	Labour
Feb 1974	constituency abolished	

== Election results ==
=== Elections in the 1910s ===
General election 1918: East Ham North
Party		Candidate	Votes	%	±%
C	Liberal	John Bethell	9,436	58.30	
	National	William Mann	6,748	41.70	
Majority			2,688	16.60	
Turnout			16,184	47.30	
Registered electors			34,219		
	Liberal win (new seat)				
C indicates candidate endorsed by the coalition government.

=== Elections in the 1920s ===
General election 1922: East Ham North
Party	Candidate	Votes	%	±%
Unionist	Charles Williamson Crook	7,215	29.74	New
Labour	Susan Lawrence	6,747	27.81	New
National Liberal	Ernest Edwards	4,775	19.68	−38.62
People's	Harry Osborn	4,021	16.57	New
Liberal	Joseph Nathaniel Emery	1,504	6.20	New
Majority		468	1.93	N/A
Turnout		24,262	69.80	+22.50
Registered electors		34,759		
Unionist gain from National Liberal		Swing		

General election 1923: East Ham North
Party	Candidate	Votes	%	±%
Labour	Susan Lawrence	8,727	35.72	+7.91
Liberal	Ernest Edwards	8,311	34.02	+27.82
Unionist	Charles Williamson Crook	7,393	30.26	+0.32
Majority		416	1.70	N/A
Turnout		24,431	68.99	−0.81
Registered electors		35,410		
Labour gain from Unionist		Swing		

General election 1924: East Ham North
Party	Candidate	Votes	%	±%
Unionist	Charles Williamson Crook	11,194	39.55	+9.29
Labour	Susan Lawrence	10,137	35.81	+0.09
Liberal	Ernest Edwards	6,970	24.63	−9.39
Majority		1,057	3.74	N/A
Turnout		24,431	77.55	+8.56
Registered electors		36,496		
Unionist gain from Labour		Swing	+4.60	

29 April 1926 by-election: East Ham North
Party	Candidate	Votes	%	±%
Labour	Susan Lawrence	10,798	40.64	+4.83
Unionist	George Jarrett	9,171	34.51	−5.04
Liberal	Leslie Burgin	6,603	24.85	+0.22
Majority		1,627	6.13	N/A
Turnout		26,572	71.71	−5.84
Registered electors		37,057		
Labour gain from Unionist		Swing	+4.94	

General election 1929: East Ham North
Party	Candidate	Votes	%	±%
Labour	Susan Lawrence	13,969	42.03	+6.22
Unionist	John Lees-Jones	11,805	35.51	−4.04
Liberal	Thomas Arnold Evans	7,459	22.44	−2.19
Majority		2,164	6.52	N/A
Turnout		33,233	71.99	−5.56
Registered electors		33,233		
Labour gain from Unionist		Swing	+5.13	

=== Elections in the 1930s ===
General election 1931: East Ham North
Party	Candidate	Votes	%	±%
Conservative	John Mayhew	22,730	65.89	+30.38
Labour	Susan Lawrence	11,769	34.11	−7.92
Majority		10,961	31.78	N/A
Turnout		34,499	73.40	+1.41
Registered electors		47,002		
Conservative gain from Labour		Swing	+19.15	

General election 1935: East Ham North
Party	Candidate	Votes	%	±%
Conservative	John Mayhew	15,295	50.89	−15.00
Labour	Thomas Burden	14,762	49.11	+15.00
Majority		533	1.78	−30.00
Turnout		30,057	64.99	−8.41
Registered electors		46,252		
Conservative hold		Swing	−15.00	

=== Election in the 1940s ===
General election 1945: East Ham North
Party	Candidate	Votes	%	±%
Labour Co-op	Percy Daines	18,373	70.16	+21.05
Conservative	John Mayhew	7,814	29.84	−21.05
Majority		10,559	40.32	N/A
Turnout		26,187	71.17	+6.18
Registered electors		37,794		
Labour Co-op gain from Conservative		Swing	+21.05	

=== Elections in the 1950s ===
General election 1950: East Ham North
Party	Candidate	Votes	%	±%
Labour Co-op	Percy Daines	20,497	57.14	−13.02
Conservative	John Mayhew	11,856	33.05	+3.21
Liberal	John Joseph Carroll	3,521	9.81	New
Majority		8,641	24.09	−16.23
Turnout		35,874	84.16	+12.99
Registered electors		42,624		
Labour Co-op hold		Swing	−8.12	

General election 1951: East Ham North
Party	Candidate	Votes	%	±%
Labour Co-op	Percy Daines	21,444	60.36	+3.22
Conservative	James Dundas Hamilton	14,085	39.64	+6.59
Majority		7,359	20.72	−2.37
Turnout		35,529	83.28	−0.88
Registered electors		42,662		
Labour Co-op hold		Swing	−1.69	

General election 1955: East Ham North
Party	Candidate	Votes	%	±%
Labour Co-op	Percy Daines	17,961	59.13	−1.23
Conservative	Arnold Silverstone	12,416	40.87	+1.23
Majority		5,545	18.26	−2.45
Turnout		30,377	74.92	−8.36
Registered electors		40,548		
Labour Co-op hold		Swing	−1.23	

30 May 1957 by-election: East Ham North
Party	Candidate	Votes	%	±%
Labour	Reg Prentice	12,546	56.26	−2.87
Conservative	John Henry Samuel Bangay	6,567	29.45	−11.42
People's League	Edward Martell	2,730	12.24	New
Ind. Labour Party	William Henry Christopher	458	2.05	New
Majority		5,979	26.81	+8.55
Turnout		22,301	57.30	−17.62
Registered electors		38,920		
Labour hold		Swing	+4.28	

General election 1959: East Ham North
Party	Candidate	Votes	%	±%
Labour	Reg Prentice	16,001	56.79	−2.34
Conservative	John Henry Samuel Bangay	12,175	43.21	+2.34
Majority		3,826	13.58	−4.68
Turnout		28,176	74.12	−0.80
Registered electors		38,014		
Labour hold		Swing	−2.34	

=== Elections in the 1960s ===
General election 1964: East Ham North
Party	Candidate	Votes	%	±%
Labour	Reg Prentice	14,501	60.36	+3.57
Conservative	John Henry Samuel Bangay	9,524	39.64	−3.57
Majority		4,977	20.72	+7.14
Turnout		24,025	67.38	−6.74
Registered electors		35,656		
Labour hold		Swing	+3.57	

General election 1966: East Ham North
Party	Candidate	Votes	%	±%
Labour	Reg Prentice	14,911	65.86	+5.50
Conservative	Laurence Giovene	7,729	34.14	−5.50
Majority		7,182	31.72	+11.00
Turnout		22,640	64.66	−2.72
Registered electors		35,016		
Labour hold		Swing	+5.50	

=== Election in the 1970s ===
General election 1970: East Ham North
Party	Candidate	Votes	%	±%
Labour	Reg Prentice	11,557	59.90	−5.96
Conservative	Neil Macfarlane	7,735	40.09	+5.95
Majority		3,822	19.81	−11.91
Turnout		19,292	52.57	−12.09
Registered electors		36,695		
Labour hold		Swing	−5.96	
