= George Jarrett =

British politician (1880–1960)

George Jarrett MP
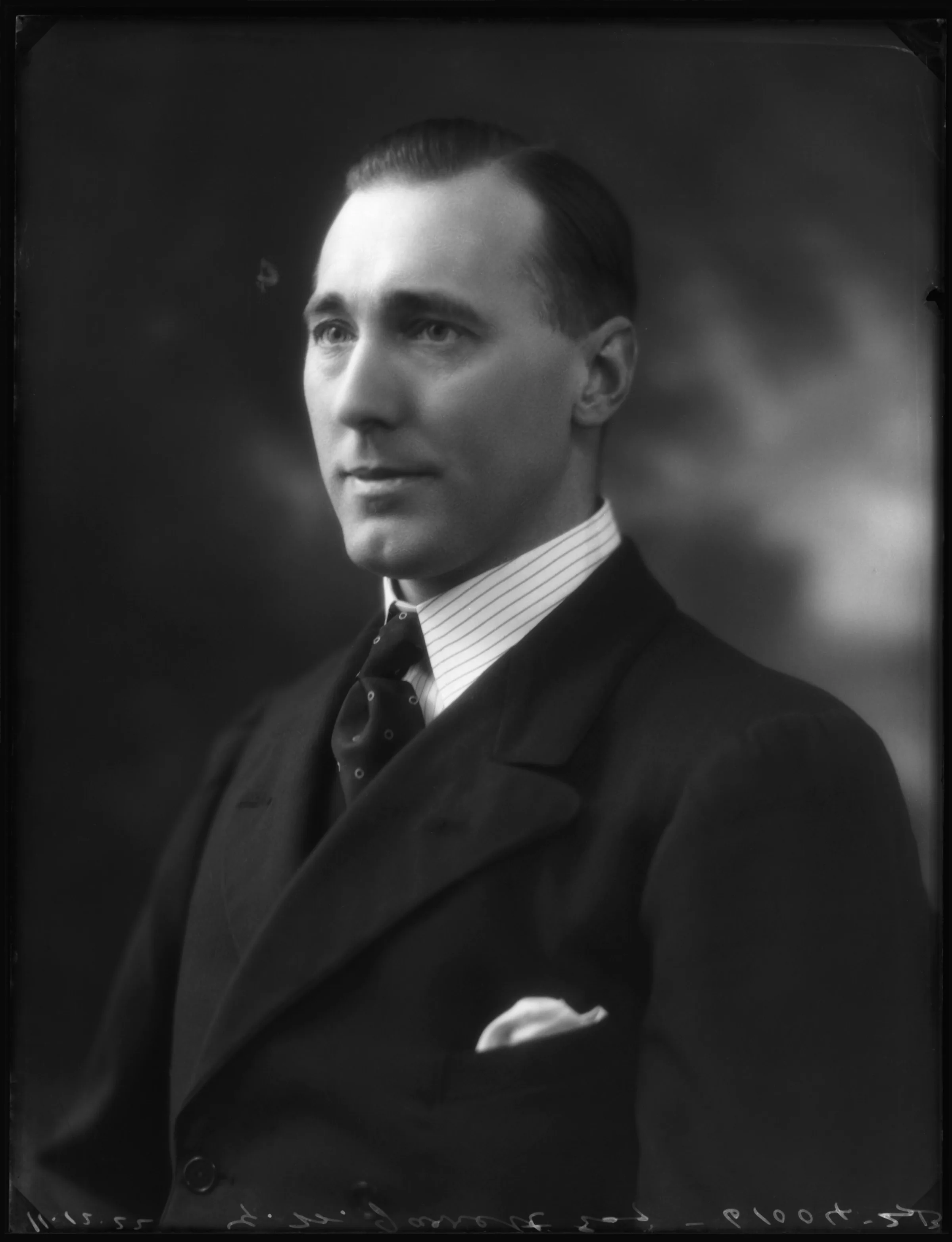
- Jarrett in 1922

Member of Parliament for Dartford
- In office 15 November 1922 – 16 November 1923
- Preceded by: John Edmund Mills
- Succeeded by: John Edmund Mills

Personal details
- Born: George William Symonds Jarrett; 15 December 1880
- Died: 6 December 1960 (aged 79)
- Party: Constitutionalist

George William Symonds Jarrett (15 December 1880 – 6 December 1960) was a British politician.

== Biography ==
During the First World War he joined the National Democratic Party (NDP), which had been set up as a pro-war party for Labour supporters. In 1917 he was appointed as the party's Chief Organiser.

At the General Election of 1918 he contested Mansfield, Nottinghamshire for the NDP. His main opponent was the Labour candidate, William Carter. Jarrett did not face a Unionist opponent but did face a Liberal candidate and an Independent candidate. His prospects improved when he received endorsement as the official Coalition candidate from Prime Minister David Lloyd George and the Unionist Leader, Bonar Law. This was helpful enough to enable him to present himself as the main challenger to Labour, however, not enough to help him win.

After 1918, the Coalition Government-supporting NDP was wound up and many of its members joined Lloyd George's National Liberal party as did Jarrett. When the Unionist party decided to end the Coalition in 1922 and force an election, Jarrett continued to support the idea of an anti-socialist coalition.

For the 1922 General Election he switched constituencies, to contest the Labour seat of Dartford, Kent, held by John Edmund Mills. He stood as a National Liberal candidate. He was again not confronted by a Unionist candidate but again had to compete with a Liberal candidate. This time he was successful, gaining the seat for the old coalition parties.Parliamentary Debates (Hansard). House of Commons. 21 December 1922.

His time as an MP was interrupted in 1923 by another General Election. For this election, Lloyd George re-united his National Liberals with the main Liberal party. Jarrett did not join the Liberal party and sought re-election in Dartford as a Constitutionalist. He again faced John Mills as the Labour candidate, but this time there was no Liberal candidate. However, this time he lost.

He did not have long to wait for a chance to get back into parliament as another General election was called for 1924. However, this time he switched to contest the Labour seat of Edmonton, Middlesex. Again he had a free run against the Labour candidate, the incumbent Francis Alfred Broad. He again stood as a Constitutionalist. Yet he narrowly failed to win the seat.

His next attempt to re-enter parliament came in 1926 when he stood as a Conservative candidate at the East Ham North by-election. The Conservatives were hoping to hold the seat they had gained at the general election. Jarrett faced both Labour and Liberal opponents and failed to hold the seat, finishing second to Labour.

His final attempt to get back into parliament was at the 1929 General election when he contested Edmonton again, this time as a Conservative candidate. However, despite the absence of a Liberal candidate, he was not able to defeat the Labour candidate.

He married Janet Mary Dunning in 1912.

Parliament of the United Kingdom
Preceded by John Edmund Mills	Member of Parliament for Dartford; 1922 – 1923	Succeeded by John Edmund Mills
