= James Bacon (judge) =

British judge

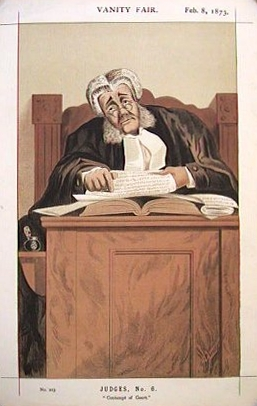
Vanity Fair caricature, 1873

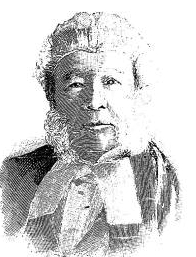
Sir James Bacon, Vice-Chancellor

Sir James Bacon (11 February 1798 – 1 June 1895) was a British judge and a Vice-Chancellor of the Court of Chancery.

Bacon was born at 10 The Polygon, Somers Town, London. His father had gone there from Holt, Norfolk, to work as an attorney's clerk in Clerkenwell. Bacon received part of his early education in Holt. He left school at twelve and worked for some years in the same attorney's firm, Rhodes and Cook, as he relates in his unpublished memoirs.

On 4 April 1822 he joined Gray's Inn and was called to the bar on 16 May 1827. As an impecunious young barrister he engaged in much literary work, such as translations from the French (including the first translation of Victor Hugo) and a pseudonymous “Memoirs of the Life and Writings of Lord Byron” which breached copyright outrageously. John Murray decided not to sue because copyright in works of doubtful moral character had become precarious following the case of William Lawrence. This work was illustrated by George Cruikshank and Bacon knew him and many literary and artistic personalities, including Charles Lamb and Mary Shelley.

He joined Lincoln's Inn in 1833 and became a bencher on 2 November 1846 soon after becoming a QC. In 1859 he became under-secretary and secretary of causes to the Master of the Rolls.

He became chief judge in bankruptcy under the Bankruptcy Act 1869, and held this post until the act was repealed in 1883 and jurisdiction over bankruptcy was transferred to the Queen's Bench Division. He also became a vice-chancellor in 1870 and was knighted and appointed to the Privy Council the following year; the post was abolished by the Supreme Court of Judicature Act 1875 but he retained the title until he retired in 1886 at the age of 88. He had become a celebrated figure for his caustic wit and activity to a great age. An example is that when a decision of his was appealed, the only thing on his notes sent to the higher court was a cartoon of the appellant and the words "This man is a liar."

He married Laura Cook, daughter of the attorney he and his father worked for, in 1827. She died in 1859. For many years he rented as a holiday home Compton Beauchamp House in Berkshire (now Oxfordshire). The couple had four sons together, two of whom predeceased the judge, and one daughter. Their granddaughter Arabella Susan Lawrence was one of the first Labour Party female MPs.

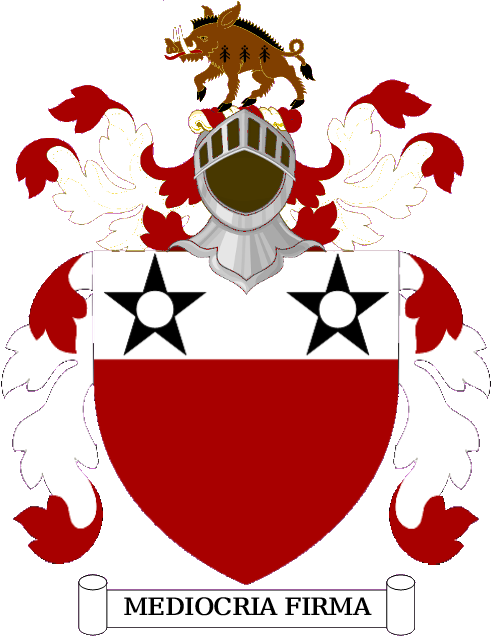
Bacon's arms as displayed at Lincoln's Inn

Legal offices
Preceded by William Milbourne James	Vice-Chancellor; 1870 - 1883	Succeeded by none (post abolished)
