= Nicholas Bethell, 4th Baron Bethell =

British politician (1938–2007)

The Right Honourable Baron Bethell GMH
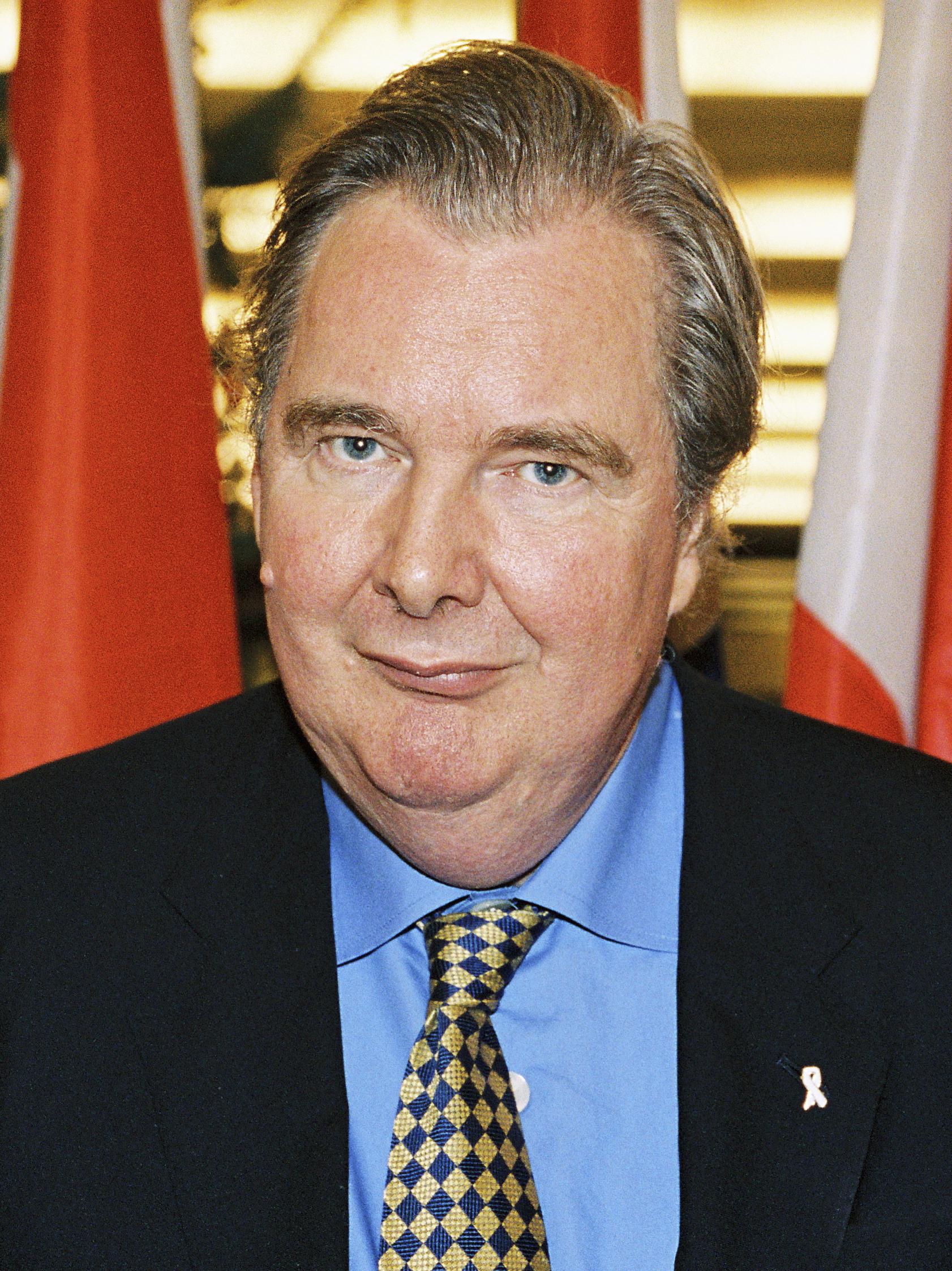
- Lord Bethell in the European Parliament in 1999.

Member of the European Parliament
- In office 1979–1994
- Constituency: London North West
- In office 1999 – October 2003
- Constituency: London

Personal details
- Born: Nicholas William Bethell; 19 July 1938 London, England
- Died: 8 September 2007 (aged 69) London, England
- Party: Conservative
- Spouse(s): Cecilia Mary Lothian Honeyman (1964–1971; divorced), Bryony Lea Morgan Griffiths (m. 1992)
- Children: 3, including James Bethell
- Education: Pembroke College, Cambridge
- Occupation: Politician, historian, translator, activist

Nicholas William Bethell, 4th Baron Bethell (19 July 1938 – 8 September 2007) was a British politician. He was a historian of Central and Eastern Europe. He was also a translator and human rights activist. He sat in the House of Lords as a Conservative from 1967 to 1999. He served as an appointed member of the European Assembly from 1975 to 1979, and as an elected Member of the European Parliament from 1979 to 1994, and from 1999 to 2003.

== Early life ==
Bethell's parents were William Gladstone Bethell (11 April 1904 – 17 October 1964) and Ann Margaret Frances (née Barlow; 27 September 1919 - 17 August 1996). His father, a stockbroker who served in the Royal Artillery in the Second World War, was the third son of John Bethell, a banker and Liberal politician who became 1st Baron Bethell in 1922. His mother was the daughter of Lieutenant Colonel Robert Barlow. His parents divorced in 1946. His mother subsequently remarried three times.

== Education ==
Bethell was educated at Harrow. He trained as a Russian interpreter during his National Service from 1956 to 1958, and studied Oriental Languages at Pembroke College, Cambridge, specialising in Arabic and Persian. He graduated in 1962, and befriended Polish students in Cambridge. He resumed his education at Cambridge as a mature student, and earned his PhD in 1987.

== Political and literary career ==
After he graduated, Bethell worked for the Times Literary Supplement from 1962 to 1964, and was a script editor for the BBC Radio Drama department from 1964 to 1967.

=== The protest of 88 and Index on Censorship ===
Professor emeritus at Georgetown University Peter Reddaway describes in some detail the role of Bethell and his close acquaintance Alexander Dolberg in "sabotaging samizdat". In 1968, for instance, Bethell supplied The Sunday Times with the text of a long, anonymous protest against the invasion of Czechoslovakia (published by The Sunday Times on 11 September) which was signed, so he asserted, by "88 of the leading Moscow progressive writers". The BBC and Radio Liberty were offered the same text by Dolberg (under his pen name "David Burg") but, unlike The Sunday Times, did not agree to publicize it.

At a time when prominent writers, scientists and public figures throughout the USSR had openly signed letters of protest against the January 1968 trial of Alexander Ginzburg and Yury Galanskov, and eight rights activists had demonstrated on 25 August that year on Red Square against the invasion of Czechoslovakia a few days earlier, the "anonymous protest" was regarded, at the least, as a hoax. Neither its author nor any more than three of its signatories were subsequently identified.

One consequence of this debacle was that Michael Scammell rather than Nicholas Bethell was chosen in 1971 to be director of Writers and Scholars International, the new NGO which founded the quarterly Index on Censorship periodical.

=== House of Lords ===
Nicholas Bethell's father died in 1964, and he inherited the barony on the unexpected early death of his cousin Guy Anthony John Bethell, 3rd Baron Bethell on 2 December 1967. He sat in the House of Lords as a Conservative until the House of Lords Act 1999 removed most hereditary peers from the chamber. He was appointed as a Lord in Waiting (a government whip in the House of Lords) in June 1970, after the 1970 general election.

=== Controversy ===
Fluent in Russian and Polish, Bethell often translated the works of Russian and Polish writers into English.

After he published a translation in 1968, together with David Burg, of Aleksandr Solzhenitsyn's Cancer Ward, an article by Auberon Waugh in Private Eye (1971) suggested Bethell had published the work without permission, and had enabled the Soviet authorities to arrest Solzhenitsyn for circulating anti-Soviet propaganda. Bethell brought a libel suit against Private Eye and resigned as a whip in January 1971 to pursue the litigation. (The case was eventually settled out of court.) The controversy denied him a place on Edward Heath's list of Conservative candidates to be appointed to the European Parliament. Heath refused to discuss the matter with him, but government papers released in 2002 under the 30-year rule revealed that Bethell's contacts with people in Communist Russia and Poland were thought to be a security risk.

Solzhenitsyn reopened the issue after he was deported from the Soviet Union, claiming that he had not authorised a Slovak dissident, Pavel Licko, to give the manuscript to Bethell, and that Licko was a Soviet agent. Licko's side of the story was given, many years later, in an issue of the Kritika i Kontekst magazine. Bethell rejected these claims, pointing out that Solzhenitsyn had accepted royalties from the publication of the translation over the years.

Solzhenitsyn first came to Western attention with the publication in the USSR of "One Day in the Life of Ivan Denisovich" (1962) and its subsequent translation into many languages (it was translated at least five times into English). Thereafter, reports of his literary activities and constant harassment by the authorities kept him in the public eye. In 1970 he was awarded the Nobel Prize for Literature, although the Soviet authorities obstructed him from receiving the award until he was deported from the USSR in 1974.

=== European Parliament ===
Bethell's political fortunes changed when Margaret Thatcher became leader of the Conservative Party. He was nominated to become a member of the European Parliament from 1975 to 1979, and sat as an elected MEP for London Northwest from 1979 to 1994. He set up the "Freedom of the Skies" in 1980, campaigning to force airlines to reduce their prices which he believed were artificially inflated by a cartel. Perceived as too European, he was not re-elected in 1994, but returned to the European Parliament as an MEP for the new regional constituency of London at the 1999 European Parliament election. At the same election, his second wife Bryony was an unsuccessful candidate on the Conservative Party list for the South East England seat. Bethell was awarded the European People's Party's Robert Schuman Medal on his retirement from the European Parliament in October 2003.

Bethell was staunchly anti-communist. In such books as Betrayed, he strongly supported the Anglo-American efforts to overthrow the Communist regimes of Eastern Europe. What Bethell criticised was the execution of such operations, not their goal. He used his European post to campaign for the human rights of dissidents in the Soviet bloc, including Andrei Sakharov and Anatoly Sharansky. He took a leading role in the foundation of the Sakharov Prize, awarded by the European Parliament since 1988.

After the fall of Communism, he continued to support critics of the Russian government, such as Vladimir Gusinsky and Alexander Litvinenko. He was also one of the first people to interview Nelson Mandela at Pollsmoor Prison in 1985.

== Awards ==
He became a Commander of the Polish Order of Merit in 1991, and received a Russian Presidential Award in 1992. Bethell was the president of the Uxbridge Conservative Association from 1995 to 1999. He was active in the movement to keep Gibraltar British, serving as president of the Friends of Gibraltar's Heritage from 1992 to 2001. For this he received the Freedom of the City of Gibraltar and the Gibraltar Medallion of Honour in 2008. He also opposed the Turkish occupation of northern Cyprus, and was president of the Friends of Cyprus Association from 2001.

== Private life ==
Bethell married twice. He married, firstly, Cecilia Mary Lothian Honeyman on 7 April 1964. She was the daughter of Alexander Honeyman, professor of Oriental Languages at St Andrews University. They had two sons, James and William, but divorced in 1971; she died in 1977. He remarried in 1992, to Bryony Lea Morgan Griffiths. They had one son, John. They resided in London. He enjoyed playing tennis and poker, and was a member of the Garrick Club and Pratt's.

He suffered from Parkinson's disease in later life, dying at age 69. He was survived by his second wife, and his three sons. He was succeeded in the barony by his eldest son, James Bethell, 5th Baron Bethell.

== Works ==
- Wladyslaw Gomulka: his Poland and his communism, New York: Holt, Rinehart and Winston, 1969.
- The War Hitler Won, September 1939, London: A. Lane 1972.
- The Last Secret: Forcible repatriation to Russia, 1944–7, with introduction by Hugh Trevor-Roper, London : Deutsch, 1974.
- Yalta: how to right the wrong, The Spectator, 25 February 1978.
- Russia Besieged, Alexandria, Va. : Time-Life Books, 1977.
- The Palestine Triangle: the struggle between the British, the Jews and the Arabs, 1935–48, London : Deutsch, 1979.
- Betrayed, London: Times Books, 1984; published in North America as The great betrayal: the untold story of Kim Philby's biggest coup, Toronto: Hodder & Stoughton, 1984.
- Spies and Other Secrets, 1994.

== Translations ==
- Six Plays by Slawomir Mrozek.
- Elegy to John Donne, And Other Poems, London: Longmans 1967 by Joseph Brodsky.
- Cancer Ward by Aleksandr Solzhenitsyn, 1968.
- The Love Girl and the Innocent by Aleksandr Solzhenitsyn, 1969.
- The Ascent of Mount Fuji by Chingiz Aitmatov, 1975.

== Notes ==
Peerage of the United Kingdom
| Preceded by Guy Anthony John Bethell | Baron Bethell; 1967–2007 | Succeeded by James Nicholas Bethell |
