= George Pascoe-Watson =

British journalist and PR consultant

- Born: 21 August 1966 (age 59); Edinburgh, Scotland
- Education: George Heriot's School; Royal High School, Edinburgh
- Alma mater: Napier College
- Occupation: Entrepreneur C-suite adviser Communication consultant Former journalist
- Spouse: Natalie Kirby (m. 2011)

George Pascoe-Watson (born 21 August 1966) is a British journalist and public relations consultant. He was formerly the political editor of The Sun newspaper, succeeding Trevor Kavanagh in January 2006.

He left The Sun in 2009 to pursue a career in consultancy, spending 14 years working for the Portland Communications agency founded by Tony Blair's former advisor Tim Allan in 2001. He is currently a founding partner at Schillings Communications.

== Early life ==
Pascoe-Watson was born in Edinburgh in 1966 to an RAF pilot and a nursing sister.

He was educated at George Heriot's School and the Royal High School. He completed a two-year journalism diploma at Napier College in Edinburgh.

== Career ==
Pascoe-Watson started his career working for local newspapers. Between 1986 and 1987, he was a reporter for the Warminster Journal in Wiltshire, and then for the free-sheet the Bristol Journal, before moving to news agency Bristol Press and Pictures.

When the news agency went bankrupt, he moved to London and joined The Sun as a junior reporter in 1988, at the age of 21. He was transferred off The Sun for a spell after he exposed a continued lack of security at Heathrow Airport shortly after the Lockerbie bombing.

In his early days at the paper, he was bylined 'Pascoe Watson' as his superiors thought the forename George and his double-barrelled surname to be too effete for the red-top's primarily working-class readership. However, they relented after he went into the Lobby.

Pascoe-Watson joined The Sun's political team in 1994. A decade later, in January 2006, he took over from Trevor Kavanagh as political editor, a post that he held until his move into consultancy.

In 2009, Pascoe-Watson joined Portland Communications, the public affairs consultancy founded by Tony Blair's former advisor Tim Allan. He spent 14 years at Portland, and was chair of the firm by the time he left in 2023.

In 2020, during the COVID pandemic Pascoe-Watson was appointed to an unpaid advisory role by the Department of Health and Social Care (DHSC); he participated in daily strategic discussions chaired by Lord Bethell. He also sent information about government policy to his paying clients before this was made public.

Pascoe-Watson co-founded Schillings Communications in January 2024, with Victoria O'Byrne. The firm is a reputation management agency affiliated with Schillings, the British libel law firm. O’Byrne was previously responsible for communications for the Prince and Princess of Wales, Richard Branson at Virgin Group, and the 2012 Olympic and Paralympic Games, and started her career as a communications advisor for the Labour Party. Pascoe-Watson and O'Byrne are both equity partners in the venture.

Pascoe-Watson has been a regular panellist on multiple broadcast shows in the UK, including BBC Question Time, Sky News, BBC News, The Week in Westminster and BBC Radio 5 Live, among others.

== Personal life ==
Pascoe-Watson married Natalie Kirby in January 2011. The two met in the Lobby, when he was political editor at The Sun and she was working for William Hague.

Media offices
Preceded by Trevor Kavanagh	Political Editor of The Sun; 2006–2009	Succeeded by Tom Newton Dunn
