= Beauchamp baronets of Grosvenor Place (1911) =

Baronetcy of the United Kingdom

Escutcheon of the Beauchamp baronets of Grosvenor Place

The Beauchamp baronetcy, of Grosvenor Place in the City of Westminster, was created in the Baronetage of the United Kingdom on 27 June 1911 for Edward Beauchamp, Member of Parliament for Lowestoft. He was the second son of the Rev. William Henry Beauchamp, second son of Sir William Beauchamp-Proctor, 3rd Baronet.

The 2nd baronet was member of Parliament for Walthamstow East from 1931 to 1945. The title became extinct on his death in 1976.

== Beauchamp baronets, of Grosvenor Place (1911) ==
- Sir Edward Beauchamp, 1st Baronet (1849–1925)
- Sir Brograve Campbell Beauchamp, 2nd Baronet (1897–1976). He had one daughter, and died leaving no male heir.

== Notes ==
Baronetage of the United Kingdom
| Preceded by Bethell baronets | Beauchamp baronets of Grosvenor Place; 27 June 1911 | Succeeded by Butlin baronets |
