= John Bethell, 1st Baron Bethell =

British politician

Sir John Bethell

John Henry Bethell, 1st Baron Bethell (23 September 1861 – 27 May 1945), known as Sir John Bethell, 1st Baronet, from 1911 to 1922, was a British banker and Liberal politician.

== Early life ==
Bethell was the son of George Bethell and his wife Frances (née Tipper), and was educated at King's College London. His younger brother was Sir Thomas Bethell (1867–1957).

== Career ==
He was a Director of Barclays Bank and of the Royal Exchange Assurance Corporation and also served twice as Mayor of East Ham and twice of West Ham.

In November 1902, Bethell was adopted as the Liberal party candidate for Romford, and he was elected to the House of Commons from that constituency in the following election in 1906. He held this seat until 1918, and then represented East Ham North between 1918 and 1922. He was created a Baronet, of Romford in the County of Essex, in 1911 and in 1922 he was raised to the peerage as Baron Bethell, of Romford in the County of Essex.

== Personal life ==
Lord Bethell married Florence, daughter of James Woolley Wyles, in 1895. They had three sons and three daughters:

- 2nd Lt. Frank Harry Bethell (18 May 1896 – † 25 September 1915), enlisted with the 3rd Battalion of the Connaught Rangers in September 1914 and joined the British Expeditionary Force in March 1915. Killed in action at the Battle of Loos.
- Dorothy Frances Bethell (17 July 1897 – 4 October 1976) married Col. Ian Ferguson MacAlpine
- Grace Bethell (3 November 1901 – 9 October 1982), married firstly Frederick Joseph Parsons, secondly Henry Seton Middleditch
- John Raymond Bethell, 2nd Baron Bethell (23 October 1902 – 30 September 1965), married Veronica Connolly
  - Guy Anthony John Bethell, 3rd Baron Bethell (1928–1967)
- William Gladstone Bethell (11 April 1904 – 17 October 1964), married Ann Margaret Frances Thornycroft
  - Nicholas William Bethell, 4th Baron Bethell (1938–2007)
- Phyllis Kathleen Bethell (19 December 1908 – 21 June 1955), married Clive Harrison Martyn

Lord Bethell died in a London nursing home, aged 83, and was succeeded in his titles by his second son, John. Lady Bethell died in 1957.

Parliament of the United Kingdom
Preceded by Louis Sinclair	Member of Parliament for Romford; 1906–1918	Succeeded by Albert Edward Martin
New constituency	Member of Parliament for East Ham North; 1918–1922	Succeeded by Charles Crook
Peerage of the United Kingdom
New creation	Baron Bethell; 1922–1945	Succeeded by John Raymond Bethell
Baronetage of the United Kingdom
New creation	Baronet (of Romford); 1911–1945	Succeeded by John Raymond Bethell
