= Norman Clarke (physicist) =

British physicist

Norman Clarke OBE (21 October 1916 – 22 November 2002), was a British physicist and politician.

== Background ==
Clarke was the eldest son of Joseph Clarke and Ellen Clarke of Oldham. He was educated at Hulme Grammar School, Oldham and then the University of Manchester, where he obtained a Bachelor of Science. While at Manchester he was President of the University Union from 1938 to 1939. In 1940 he married Hilda May Watts. They had two daughters. In 1982 he was awarded the OBE.

== Professional career ==
During the war Clarke worked on research for the Ministry of Supply. He was at the External Ballistics Department of the Ordnance Board at Chislehurst, from 1939 to 1942. He was at the Armament Research Establishment, Br. for Theoretical Research at Fort Halstead from 1942 to 1945. He was Deputy Secretary for the Institute of Physics from 1945 to 1965. He was Honorary Secretary for the International Community on Physics Education, from 1960 to 1966. He was first Secretary and then Registrar at the Institute of Mathematics and its Applications from 1964 to 1987, and then emeritus. He was FInstP; FIMA (Hon. FIMA 1990).

== Political career ==
Clarke was first Secretary and then Chairman of Manchester University Liberal Association. He sat on the Executive of the Home Counties Liberal Federation. He was Liberal candidate for the Romford division of Essex at the 1950 General Election. This was not a promising seat for the Liberals who had come third in 1945. In a difficult election for the Liberals he also finished third, losing his deposit. He did not stand for parliament again;

General Election 1950: Romford
Party	Candidate	Votes	%	±%
Conservative	John Cutts Lockwood	27,656	46.1	+11.2
Labour	Thomas Macpherson	26,387	43.9	−8.9
Liberal	Norman Clarke	6,014	10.0	−2.3
Majority		1,269	2.2	−15.8
Turnout			85.7	+11.1
Conservative gain from Labour		Swing		

He was a Member of Southend-on-Sea CBC, from 1961 to 1974 (Alderman from 1964 to 1974, Chairman of Watch Committee from 1962 to 1969 and of the Public Protection Committee from 1969 to 1978). He then sat as a member of Southend-on-Sea Borough Council from 1974 to 1993 serving as Mayor from 1975 to 1976, Chairman of the Highways Committee from 1980 to 1984, Council Leader from 1984 to 1987 and 1990–93 and Leader of the Conservative Group from 1984 to 1993. He was vice-chairman of the Essex Police Authority from 1969 to 1985. He was a Member of Essex County Council from 1973 to 1985. He was made an Honorary Freeman of Southend-on-Sea in 1996.

== Publications ==
He was editor and contributor to A Physics Anthology. With S. C. Brown he wrote International Education in Physics. He wrote Why Teach Physics? and The Education of a Physicist. He was a contributor to A Survey of the Teaching of Physics in Universities (Unesco). He wrote Metrication and various papers on education.
