= John Parker (Labour politician) =

British politician (1906–1987)

- Parker in 1978

Father of the House of Commons
- In office 3 May 1979 – 9 June 1983
- Preceded by: George Strauss
- Succeeded by: James Callaghan

Member of Parliament for Dagenham
- In office 5 July 1945 – 13 May 1983
- Preceded by: Constituency established
- Succeeded by: Bryan Gould

Member of Parliament for Romford
- In office 14 November 1935 – 5 July 1945
- Preceded by: William Hutchison
- Succeeded by: Thomas Macpherson

Personal details
- Born: Herbert John Harvey Parker; 15 July 1906 Bristol, England
- Died: 24 November 1987 (aged 81) London, England
- Party: Labour
- Spouse: Zena Mimardiere (m. 1943)
- Children: 1
- Education: St John's College, Oxford

Herbert John Harvey Parker (15 July 1906 – 24 November 1987) was a British Labour Party politician. He was first elected as the Member of Parliament for Romford in November 1935. After boundary changes, he continued as MP for Dagenham from 1945, remaining in the House of Commons until he retired in June 1983. As the longest-serving MP, he was the Father of the House of Commons from 1979 to 1983. When he left parliament in 1983, he was the last serving Member of Parliament to have served in the Commons before the Second World War.

With over 47 years in office, he was the longest-serving Labour MP in the party's history until 15 December 2017, when his record was overtaken by Dennis Skinner.

== Early and private life ==
Parker was born in Bristol and raised in Liverpool. He was educated at Marlborough College and St John's College, Oxford, where he was the chairman of the Oxford University Labour Club.

He married Zena Mimardiere in 1943; the couple had one son.

== Political career ==
He contested the seat of Holland with Boston in Lincolnshire in the 1931 general election, but the sitting National Liberal MP James Blindell was reelected.

In the 1935 general election, Parker was elected as MP for Romford in Essex, which he represented until 1945. He was elected as MP for Dagenham at the 1945 general election, a new seat carved out of the Romford constituency. (His Labour colleague Thomas Macpherson was elected in Romford in 1945, but lost the seat to the Conservative John Lockwood in 1950).

Parker was briefly a junior minister from 1945 to 1946, serving as Parliamentary Under-Secretary of State in the Dominions Office, with future prime minister James Callaghan as his Parliamentary Private Secretary (PPS). He lost this position as a result of the strong views he held regarding South Africa. He remained a backbencher afterwards, serving on several Parliamentary committees, including the Procedure Committee from 1966 to 1973.

His private member's bill introduced in 1952 to repeal the Sunday Observance Act 1780 was rejected; however, another private member's bill of his became the Legitimacy Act 1959, dealing with the legitimacy of children from void marriages and that of children whose parents married after their birth. He also shepherded a ten-minute rule bill into law, the British Nationality (No 2) Act 1964, which implemented into British law the United Nations Convention on the Reduction of Statelessness.

He remained MP for Dagenham until he retired at the 1983 general election. He was the last serving MP to have been elected before the Second World War, and he was the Father of the House of Commons from 1979 to 1983. His former PPS, James Callaghan, was the next MP to hold this honorary title.

Parker was associated with the Fabian Society throughout his political career. He became General Secretary of the New Fabian Research Bureau in 1933 and was General Secretary of the Fabian Society from 1939 to 1945. He was subsequently its Vice-Chairman and Chairman. He became President of the Fabian Society in 1980.

He wrote several books, including 42 Days in the Soviet Union (1946) and Labour Marches On (1947), and his memoirs, Father of the House (1982). His archive of papers, spanning nearly 40 years of public office from 1943 to 1982, are held by the London School of Economics as part of the British Library of Political and Economic Science.

== Death ==
Parker died in London on 24 November 1987, at the age of 81.

Parliament of the United Kingdom
Preceded by William Hutchison	Member of Parliament for Romford; 1935–1945	Succeeded by Thomas Macpherson
New constituency	Member of Parliament for Dagenham; 1945–1983	Succeeded by Bryan Gould
Political offices
Preceded by George Strauss	Father of the House; 1979–1983	Succeeded by James Callaghan
Party political offices
Preceded by Frank Wallace Galton	General Secretary of the Fabian Society; 1939 – 1945	Succeeded by Bosworth Monck
Preceded by G. D. H. Cole	Chairman of the Fabian Society; 1950 – 1953	Succeeded by Austen Albu
Preceded by Margaret Cole	President of the Fabian Society; 1980 – 1987	Succeeded by Billy Hughes
