= 1894 Romford by-election =

UK parliamentary by-election

The 1894 Romford by-election was held on 2 April 1894 after the death of the incumbent Conservative MP James Theobald. The seat was retained by the Conservative Party candidate Alfred Money Wigram.

Romford by-election, 1894
Party	Candidate	Votes	%	±%
Conservative	Alfred Wigram	7,573	52.4	−2.4
Liberal	John Bethell	6,890	47.6	+2.4
Majority		683	4.8	−4.8
Turnout		14,463	76.0	+2.8
Registered electors		19,040		
Conservative hold		Swing	-2.4	
