= 1897 Romford by-election =

UK parliamentary by-election

The 1897 Romford by-election was held on 1 February 1897 after the retirement of the incumbent Conservative MP Alfred Money Wigram. The seat was retained by the Conservative Party candidate Louis Sinclair.

Romford by-election, 1897
Party	Candidate	Votes	%	±%
Conservative	Louis Sinclair	8,156	50.4	−5.8
Liberal	Herbert Raphael	8,031	49.6	+5.8
Majority		125	0.8	−11.6
Turnout		16,187	69.0	−1.7
Registered electors		23,475		
Conservative hold		Swing	-5.8	
