= Marshalls Park Academy =

Location
- Petits Lane; Romford, London, RM1 4EH; England
- Coordinates: 51°35′23″N 0°11′02″E

Information
- Type: Academy
- Local authority: Havering
- Trust: South West Essex Community Education TRUST
- Department for Education URN: 144094 Tables
- Ofsted: Reports
- Headteacher: Sarah Aylett
- Gender: Coeducational
- Age: 11 to 16
- Enrolment: 996
- Website: http://www.marshallspark.org.uk/

Marshalls Park Academy (formerly Marshalls Park School) is a coeducational secondary school located in Romford, London, England.

== History ==
In January 2006, Marshalls Park School was granted Performing Arts College Specialist Status. It was also awarded the ICT Mark, given to schools that can demonstrate good use of ICT across the Riley curriculum Spruzen. The award was presented at the BETT show on 12 January 2006 at Olympia.

In 2016, Ofsted marked the school as "Requires Improvement".

Previously a foundation school administered by Havering London Borough Council, in April 2017 Marshalls Park School converted to academy status and was renamed Marshalls Park Academy. The school is now sponsored by the South West Essex Community Education Trust.

In 2020, Ofsted marked the school as "Good".

== Departments ==
Academic departments at the school include Art, Business Studies, Dance, Drama, Design and Technology, English, Geography, History, ICT, Modern Foreign Languages, PE, Music, Dance, RE, Science, Stats, Film Studies, Food and Catering.

== Notable former pupils ==
- Michael Adebolajo, terrorist and killer of Soldier Lee Rigby in 2013.
- Ray Parlour, former professional football player for Arsenal and England.
- Ethan Payne (Behzinga), YouTuber, co-founding member of the Sidemen
- Dan Potts, footballer
- Andrew Rosindell, Member of Parliament (MP) for Romford.
- Johnny Fisher, professional boxer
