= Chase Cross (ward) =

Electoral ward in East London, England

- Former electoral ward for the Havering London Borough Council
- Chase Cross ward boundaries from 1978 to 2002
- Borough: Havering
- County: Greater London
- Population: 7,354 (1991)
- Electorate: 5,484 (1998)
- Major settlements: Chase Cross, Havering-atte-Bower

Former electoral ward
- Created: 1978
- Abolished: 2002
- Councillors: 2
- Replaced by: Havering Park

Chase Cross was an electoral ward in the London Borough of Havering from 1978 to 2002. The ward was first used in the 1978 elections. It returned two councillors to Havering London Borough Council.

== List of councillors ==
Term	Councillor	Party
1978–1982	Randall Evans	Conservative
1978–1982	William Odulate	Conservative
1982–1988	Eric Freeman	Alliance
1982–1990	Leonard Parmenter	Alliance
1988–1990	Paul Einchcomb	Liberal Democrats
1990–2002	Andrew Rosindell	Conservative
1990–1994	Cyril North	Conservative
1994–1998	Michael White	Conservative
1998–2002	Henry Tebbutt	Conservative

== Havering council elections ==
There was a very minor adjustment of the ward boundaries on 1 April 1994.

=== 1998 election ===
The election on 7 May 1998 took place on the same day as the 1998 Greater London Authority referendum.

1998 Havering London Borough Council election: Chase Cross
Party	Candidate	Votes	%	±%
Conservative	Andrew Rosindell	2,067		
Conservative	Henry Tebbutt	1,730		
Labour	Paul Stygal	462		
Labour	Frederick Symes	427		
Registered electors				
Turnout				
Conservative hold				
Conservative hold				

=== 1994 election ===
The election took place on 5 May 1994.

1994 Havering London Borough Council election: Chase Cross
Party	Candidate	Votes	%	±%
Conservative	Andrew Rosindell	1,762	61.04	▲14.06
Conservative	Michael White	1,493		
Labour	Pauline Koseda	1,061	38.96	▲7.85
Labour	Terrance Osborne	1,017		
Registered electors		5,502		▼168
Turnout		2,889	52.51	▼3.20
Rejected ballots		7	0.24	▲0.11
Conservative hold				
Conservative hold				

=== 1990 election ===
The election took place on 3 May 1990.

1990 Havering London Borough Council election: Chase Cross
Party	Candidate	Votes	%	±%
Conservative	Andrew Rosindell	1,472	46.98	
Conservative	Cyril North	1,375		
Labour	Pauline Koseda	949	31.11	
Labour	Dennis Cook	937		
Liberal Democrats	Paul Einchcomb	683	21.91	
Liberal Democrats	Terry Hurlstone	645		
Registered electors		5,670		
Turnout		3,159	55.71	
Rejected ballots		4	0.13	
Conservative gain from Liberal Democrats		Swing		
Conservative gain from Liberal Democrats		Swing		

=== 1988 by-election ===
The by-election took place on 21 January 1988, following the death of Eric Freeman.

1988 Chase Cross by-election
Party	Candidate	Votes	%	±%
Liberal Democrats	Paul Einchcomb	830		
Conservative	Andrew Rosindell	757		
Labour	Pauline Koscda	540		
Independent	Michael Griffin	14		
Turnout				
Liberal Democrats hold				

=== 1986 election ===
The election took place on 8 May 1986.

1986 Havering London Borough Council election: Chase Cross
Party	Candidate	Votes	%	±%
Liberal Alliance FT	Eric Freeman	1,115		
Liberal Alliance FT	Leonard Parmenter	1,017		
Labour	Robert Kilbey	768		
Labour	Pauline Koseda	759		
Conservative	Roger Farrow	567		
Conservative	George Rusz	469		
Turnout				
Liberal Alliance FT hold				
Liberal Alliance FT hold				

=== 1982 election ===
The election took place on 6 May 1982.

1982 Havering London Borough Council election: Chase Cross
Party	Candidate	Votes	%	±%
Alliance	Eric Freeman	941		
Alliance	Leonard Parmenter	912		
Conservative	Philip Brown	764		
Conservative	William Odulate	693		
Labour	Terence Muldoon	575		
Labour	Henry Webb	516		
National Front	Madeline Caine	35		
National Front	Roy Allman	34		
Turnout				
Alliance gain from Conservative		Swing		
Alliance gain from Conservative		Swing		

=== 1978 election ===
The election took place on 4 May 1978.

1978 Havering London Borough Council election: Chase Cross
Party	Candidate	Votes	%	±%
Conservative	Randall Evans	1,235		
Conservative	William Odulate	1,172		
Labour	Arthur Latham	961		
Labour	Sydney Parrish	863		
Communist	Colin Harper	84		
Turnout				
Conservative win (new seat)				
Conservative win (new seat)				
