= Andrew Rosindell =

British politician (born 1966)

Andrew Rosindell MP
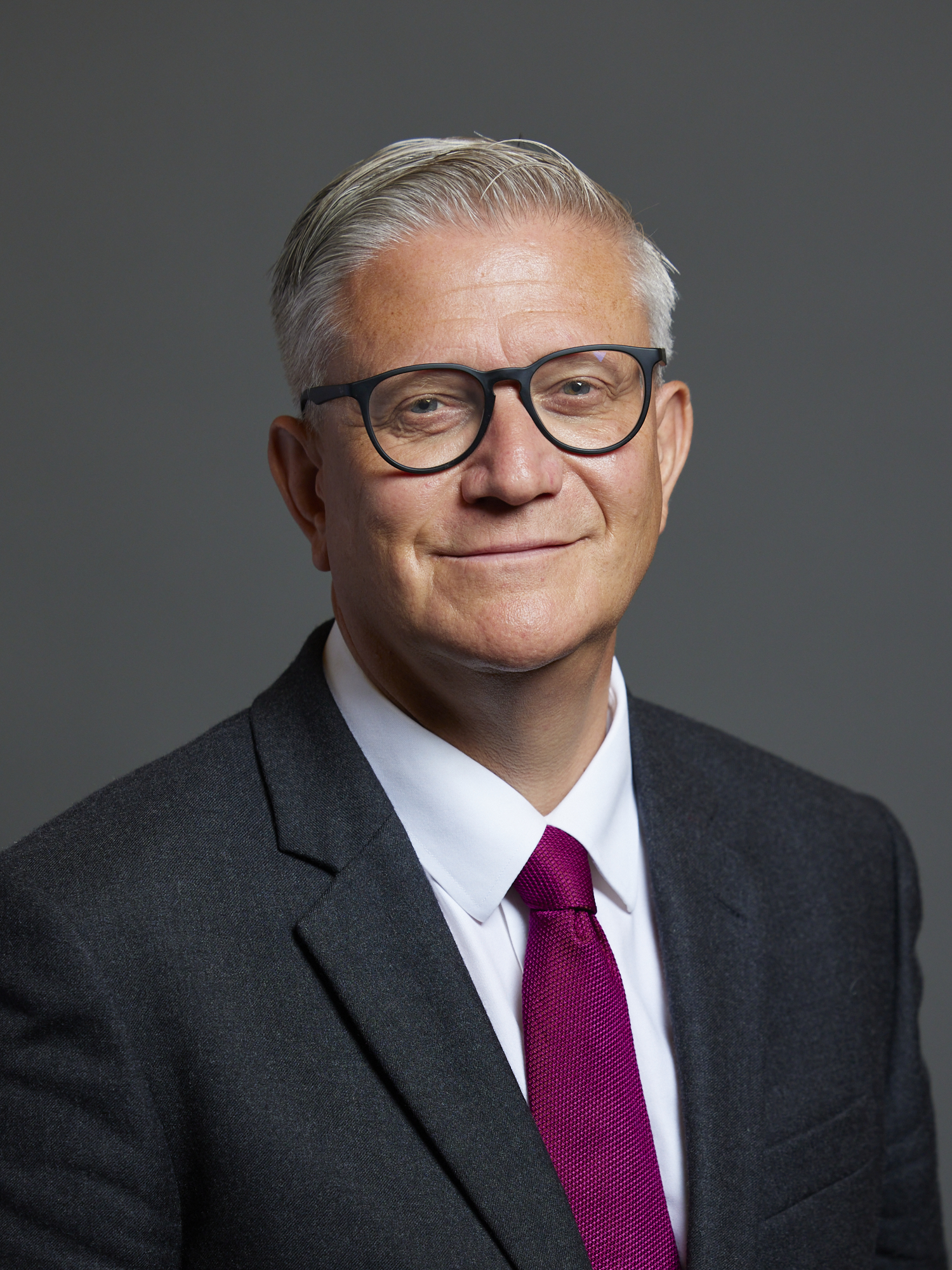
- Official portrait, 2024

Shadow Minister for Foreign Affairs
- In office 20 November 2024 – 18 January 2026
- Leader: Kemi Badenoch
- Preceded by: Alicia Kearns
- Succeeded by: Alicia Kearns (2026)

Shadow Minister for Home Affairs
- In office 3 July 2007 – 6 May 2010
- Leader: David Cameron
- Preceded by: Edward Garnier
- Succeeded by: David Hanson

Member of Parliament for Romford
- Incumbent
- Assumed office 7 June 2001
- Preceded by: Eileen Gordon
- Majority: 1,463 (3.3%)

Member of Havering London Borough Council for Chase Cross
- In office May 1990 – May 2002

Personal details
- Born: Andrew Richard Rosindell; 17 March 1966 (age 60) Romford, London, England
- Party: Reform UK (since 2026)
- Other political affiliations: Conservative (1980–2026)
- Education: Marshalls Park Academy
- Website: rosindell.com

Andrew Richard Rosindell (/ˈrɒzɪnˌdɛl/; born 17 March 1966) is a British politician who has served as the Member of Parliament (MP) for Romford since 2001. He was elected as a Conservative MP before his defection to Reform UK on 18 January 2026.

Rosindell holds socially conservative and Eurosceptic political views; he campaigned for Brexit and was one of the 28 original Conservative MPs who rebelled against Theresa May's Brexit withdrawal agreement in 2019.

He has been the international director of the European Foundation, chairman of the All Party Parliamentary Flags and Heraldry Committee and the UK's All-Party Parliamentary Group on the British Overseas Territories.

== Early life and career ==
Andrew Rosindell was born on 17 March 1966 in Romford, London, as the son of a school dinner lady. Rosindell attended Marshalls Park School. He joined the Conservative Party at the age of 14.

He was chairman of the Young Conservatives from 1993 to 1994, chairman of the International Young Democrat Union from 1998 to 2002, and from 1997 to 2001, he was director of the European Foundation think tank.

Before being elected to Parliament, he was a local councillor in Romford on Havering Council, gaining the Chase Cross ward from the Liberal Democrats in 1990. Rosindell did not stand for re-election after being elected to Parliament, and ceased to be a councillor on 2 May 2002.

Rosindell was elected to the House of Commons at the 2001 general election as MP for Romford, on his third attempt. At the 1992 general election, Rosindell had stood as the Conservative candidate in Glasgow Provan, coming third with 7.8% of the vote behind the incumbent Labour MP Jimmy Wray and the Liberal Democrat candidate. Rosindell stood for parliament again in the 1997 general election in Thurrock, coming second with 26.8% of the vote behind the incumbent Labour MP Andrew MacKinlay. His successful campaign in Romford included a visit in the constituency from former Conservative Prime Minister Margaret Thatcher during the campaign, in which Rosindell also canvassed with his Staffordshire Bull Terrier Spike, who wore a Union Flag waistcoat. This was a tactic Rosindell had employed previously, such as his campaign in Glasgow Provan in 1992.

== Parliamentary career ==
=== Backbenches (2001–2007) ===
At his election as a Conservative Member of Parliament in 2001, Rosindell's political views were chacterised as socially conservative and Thatcherite, with a 2002 BBC profile called him "a right-wing populist". Upon his election to Parliament, Rosindell was a member of the Monday Club, a Conservative-aligned group that had gained notoriety in the 1970 and 1980s for its fierce opposition to non-white immigration to Britain and its support for apartheid-era South Africa and Southern Rhodesia. Rosindell was compelled to resign from the group shortly following his election the party's then-leader Iain Duncan Smith. He is the final sitting MP who was a member while holding office.

Following his initial election in 2001, Rosindell was re-elected at the 2005 general election with an increased majority of 11,589.

=== Shadow Minister for Home Affairs (2007–2010) ===
In 2007, Rosindell was appointed by Conservative Party leader, David Cameron, to serve as a Shadow Minister for Home Affairs.

At the beginning of the MPs' expenses scandal, in June 2009, The Daily Telegraph reported that Rosindell "claimed more than £125,000 in second home expenses for a flat in London, while designating his childhood home 17 miles away – where his mother lived – as his main address", and between "2006 and 2008 claimed the maximum £400 a month for food".

In March 2010, the BBC reported that Rosindell had breached Parliamentary rules by accepting subsidised overseas trips to Gibraltar and subsequently raising multiple Gibraltar-related issues in Parliament without disclosing the trips in the Register of Members' Interests.

=== Return to the backbenches (2010–2024) ===
Roseindell was re-elected again at the 2010 general election, with a further increased majority of 16,954. and following a demotion from the Shadow frontbench, was appointed by the Chairman of the Conservative Party, Sayeeda Warsi, onto the board of the Westminster Foundation for Democracy.

In September 2010, Rosindell sponsored the first Erotica event to be held in the Houses of Parliament. Rosindell maintained that he was promoting the hosts, a Romford-based business, as was his duty as the constituency MP.

Rosindell proposed in 2012 that Crown Dependencies and British Overseas Territories should be represented in the UK parliament, like dependencies of Australia, Denmark, France and the Netherlands have been.

In June 2012, Rosindell was criticised for expressing "huge admiration" for former Chilean President Augusto Pinochet. "Pinochet ousted a communist regime in Chile that was butchering its people," he said. "Compared with the rest of Latin America during the '70s and '80s, Chile turned into a free society where people were able to prosper." The comments were condemned by Labour Leader Ed Miliband and neighbouring Labour MP Jon Cruddas, who stated in an interview with the Romford Recorder that "Augusto Pinochet assumed power in a coup d'état and overthrew a democratically elected government. According to various reports and investigations thousands of people were killed in this process, and tens of thousands were interned and tortured by his regime". Rosindell made the comments whilst defending a local colleague who had been criticised for apparently endorsing Pinochet, and stated that Pinochet had overthrown a "far worse" communist regime and that "we should be grateful" for the assistance Pinochet's Chile provided to the British forces retaking the Falkland Islands.

In 2012, Rosindell became chairman of the All-Party Parliamentary Zoos and Aquariums Group. Rosindell joined Philip Davies and Christopher Chope in repeatedly blocking a backbench bill banning the use of wild animals in circuses from progressing through Parliament, finally blocking it by lodging an objection in March 2015. Rosindell had earlier argued the circus is a "Great British institution…[that] deserves to be defended against the propaganda and exaggerations". The bill had the support of the Coalition government and the Labour opposition.

In February 2015, Rosindell cast doubt on the ability of Rachel Reeves (then Shadow Secretary of State for Work and Pensions) to handle that ministerial responsibility in a potential post-election Labour cabinet, as she would be taking maternity leave soon after the election and would then have a young child to care for following her return to the post in September. He was criticised for the remarks by Labour MPs, whilst Conservative leader and Prime Minister David Cameron described his comments as "outrageous".

At the 2015 general election, Rosindell was again re-elected, with a decreased vote share of 51% and a decreased majority of 13,859.

Since the start of 2016, Rosindell has been a member of the Advisory Board of the UK-based 'Polar Regions' think-tank Polar Research and Policy Initiative.

Rosindell was again re-elected at the snap 2017 general election, with an increased vote share of 59.4% and a decreased majority of 13,778.

During the police action surrounding the 2017 Catalan independence referendum, Rosindell spoke out in his capacity as the vice-chairman of the APPG on Catalonia to say the UK should have sent a 'much stronger' message about condemning the Spanish government's reaction, saying the violence "brought shame on Spain and shame on the European Union".

In June 2018, Rosindell co-sponsored a Bill with Lord Empey to use Libyan funds frozen under Chapter 7 of the UN Charter, to compensate victims of IRA terrorism supported by the Gaddafi regime.

On 4 July 2018, Rosindell announced his bid to become the Conservative candidate for Mayor of London at the 2020 mayoral election. He failed to make the final shortlist.

In January 2019, The Times discovered that Rosindell's Facebook account was a member of a group supporting far-right activist Tommy Robinson. The group was specifically concerned with supporting Robinson after he was jailed for contempt of court. Rosindell said that he had been added to the group without his knowledge; however, according to The Times, it would be necessary for a Facebook user to confirm acceptance before being added to a group.

At the 2019 general election, Rosindell was again re-elected, with an increased vote share of 64.6% and an increased majority of 17,893.

On 21 October 2020, Rosindell was removed as trade envoy to Tanzania, a position to which he had been appointed to by Theresa May in 2018, because of his highly critical views against Boris Johnson's three-tier lockdown plan to tackle the second wave of the coronavirus pandemic in the UK.

Following an interim report on the connections between colonialism and properties now in the care of the National Trust, including links with historic slavery, Rosindell was among the signatories of a letter to The Telegraph in November 2020 from the "Common Sense Group" of Conservative Parliamentarians. The letter accused the National Trust of being "coloured by cultural Marxist dogma, colloquially known as the 'woke agenda'". He is the Hon. President and Patron of the Royalists.

In November 2021, during an interview on the BBC's Newsnight, Rosindell said he was cautious about the idea of MPs being banned from having second jobs. He said MPs are "human beings who have families and responsibilities" but that the first duty of MPs "must be to Parliament, to our constituency and to the work we do for our country."

Politico reported in December 2022 that Rosindell was among a small group of about ten backbench MPs who had made a large number of overseas visits while in office. Rosindell's travel record included 16 trips to Gibraltar and 29 trips to other countries, valued at around £45,247.

=== Shadow Parliamentary Secretary for Foreign Affairs (2024–2026) ===
Rosindell was again re-elected at the 2024 general election, with a decreased vote share of 34.8% and a decreased majority of 1,463. In Kemi Badenoch's first shadow cabinet, Rosindell was appointed Shadow Parliamentary Secretary for Foreign Affairs.

In March 2025, Rosindell called on the Republic of Ireland to "take their rightful place in the family of the Commonwealth of Nations" during a debate on Saint Patrick's Day.

=== Reform UK (2026–) ===
On 18 January 2026, Rosindell resigned from the Conservative Party and defected to Reform UK, citing disagreements with the party's policies, and track record both in government and opposition. Rosindell also made reference to the Chagos Islands deal in his resignation. His defection came after Robert Jenrick and Nadhim Zahawi defected to Reform in the week prior.

Following Rosindell's defection from the Conservative Party to Reform UK, the Romford Conservative Association (RCA) changed the locks to their constituency office, arguing that occupation was contingent on his membership of the Conservative party. In March 2026, Rosindell attempted to obtain an injunction to order RCA to allow him and his staff entry. The High Court ruled that RCA acted lawfully, and ordered Rosindell to pay £23,000 of the RCA's legal costs.

== Views on LGBT issues ==
Rosindell has consistently voted against bills furthering LGBT rights, including equalising the age of consent, civil partnerships and scrapping Section 28 of the Local Government Act 1988, which banned teachers from "promoting homosexuality" or "teaching ... the acceptability of homosexuality as a pretended family relationship". He has said, "I do not believe that politicians should interfere with and attempt to redefine ancient customs, traditions and ceremonies, most of which are based on religious foundations and have been in existence through the ages."

In 2013, Rosindell opposed the legalisation of same-sex marriage, stating: "Where would it end? You could finish up at a stage where the monarchy in this country is in a same-sex marriage and that would have constitutional implications."

== Views on Euroscepticism and border control ==
In 2012, Rosindell unsuccessfully attempted to introduce the United Kingdom Borders Bill, a private member's bill aiming to create a dedicated entry queue for citizens of countries where the British Queen is head of state, as well as introducing pictures of the Queen and more royal symbols at UK borders. He reiterated calls for preferential treatment of "Her Majesty's subjects" visiting Britain in 2015, whilst also calling for the immigration system to favour Commonwealth citizens, as opposed to those from the EU. This measure was then adopted by Chancellor Philip Hammond in his October 2018 budget.

Rosindell has spoken in favour of a federal UK and in 2014 proposed a bill calling for a separate English Parliament, whilst declaring himself opposed to the idea of imposing English votes for English laws restrictions on the Westminster Parliament.

In September 2015, Rosindell presented a Ten Minute Rule Bill to Parliament entitled the United Kingdom Borders (Control and Sovereignty) Bill. In his speech presenting the Bill, he argued that Britain must take back control of its borders from the European Union, stating that "A nation that does not retain sovereignty over its national borders will ultimately be powerless to determine its own destiny". The speech also advocated a policy of controlled immigration, arguing that public services were unable to keep up with the number of people entering the country every year.

In an early day motion of 3 November 2016, as a celebration of the Brexit vote and Britain withdrawing from the European Union, Rosindell argued for a return to the broadcasting of "God Save the Queen" at the end of BBC One transmissions each day. The practice was dropped in 1997 (ostensibly due to BBC One adopting 24-hour broadcasting by simulcasting BBC News 24 overnight, rendering closedown obsolete). That evening, BBC Two's Newsnight programme ended its nightly broadcast with host Kirsty Wark saying that they were "incredibly happy to oblige" Rosindell's request, before ending with a clip of the Sex Pistols performing the punk song of the same name (an anti-monarchist song), much to Rosindell's discontent.

In 2017, Rosindell said: "The humiliation of having a pink European Union passport will now soon be over and the United Kingdom nationals can once again feel pride and self-confidence in their own nationality when travelling, just as the Swiss and Americans can do. National identity matters and there is no better way of demonstrating this today than by bringing back this much-loved national symbol when travelling overseas."

== Flags and heraldry ==
Rosindell is well known for his interest in flags, being described by The Times in 2011 as a "flag fanatic".

On 5 February 2008, Rosindell became founding chairman of the All Party Parliamentary Flag Group (APPFG), and proposed a Union Flag Bill under the Ten Minute Rule. The APPFG changed its name to the Flags & Heraldry Committee in April 2010.

In April 2021 Rosindell joined other Conservative Party members in calling for the Union Flag to be flown outside all UK schools.

== Sexual assault allegation ==
In May 2022, Rosindell was arrested by the Metropolitan Police on suspicion of indecent assault, sexual assault, rape, abuse of position of trust, and misconduct in public office. He had been under investigation since January 2020 for events occurring between 2002 and 2009, when he was a whip and shadow minister. He repeatedly denied any wrongdoing.

In February 2024, the Metropolitan Police concluded that the evidence held did not meet the threshold for prosecution and that no further action would be taken. A spokesperson for Rosindell stated that "He has been working constantly for Romford throughout the past 21 months and will continue to speak up for the people of his beloved home town as their local MP."

Parliament of the United Kingdom
Preceded by Eileen Gordon	Member of Parliament for Romford; 2001–present	Incumbent
