= Lord Macpherson =

Lord Macpherson may refer to:

- Thomas Macpherson, 1st Baron Macpherson of Drumochter (1888–1965), Scottish businessman and politician
- Nick Macpherson, Baron Macpherson of Earl's Court (born 1959), British former civil servant
