= Narratophilia =

Sexual arousal from explicit language

Narratophilia is a sexual fetish in which words and stories are sexually arousing, usually by the telling of dirty and obscene words or stories to a partner. For some people, writings or words that are not outright obscene can have the same arousal effect. The term is also used for arousal by means of listening to obscene words and stories.

== Etymology ==
=== Terminology and classification ===
The term narratophilia derives from the Latin verb narrāre, to tell or relate, and the Greek-derived suffix -philia, fondness for or attraction to. It follows a morphological pattern common in twentieth-century neologisms in sexology, where a descriptive root is joined with -philia to describe a particular focus of erotic arousal. Examples include pictophilia (attraction to images), coprophilia (sexual interest in feces), and scopophilia (sexual arousal from observation). This terminology shows an effort by clinicians and researchers to construct a neutral vocabulary for describing atypical sexual interests during the rise of modern sexology in the mid-twentieth century.

Within the taxonomy of paraphilias, narratophilia is regarded as one of many atypical sexual interests rather than a formally recognized clinical condition. The term indicates arousal elicited by erotic or obscene verbal content which can be spoken, written, or imagined. This places it alongside other paraphilias that involve sensory or representational media, such as pictophilia.

Major diagnostic manuals, including the Diagnostic and Statistical Manual of Mental Disorders, do not list narratophilia as a discrete disorder. Under current criteria for nosology, a paraphilic interest is not considered pathological unless it results in clinically significant distress, functional impairment, or involves non-consensual behavior. Consequently, narratophilia is classified as a paraphilic interest but not diagnostically as a "paraphilic disorder."

=== Earliest Usage ===
The earliest documented appearance of the term narratophilia is dated to the early 1970s, when the sexologist John Money and his collaborator Anke Ehrhardt introduced the terms narratophilia and pictophilia in the book Man & Woman, Boy & Girl as examples of erotographic paraphilias. This placed narratophilia in Money's larger framework of lovemaps, a conceptual model that describes the way people develop erotic arousal patterns. This early 1970s usage is corroborated by simultaneous scholarly writings that adopted the term as a part of the technical terminology of paraphilias.

Subsequent commentary has confirmed this publication as when the term was coined. A later Archives of Sexual Behavior article by Diederik F. Janssen explicitly identifies Money and Ehrhardt as the first to use the word narratophilia in print, noting that it arose within the background of mid-century clinical sexology that searched to catalogue paraphilias with increasing linguistic precision. Janssen places the term alongside other neologisms coined by Money to describe atypical erotic focuses, emphasizing its etymological transparency and its alignment with contemporaneous linguistic trends in psychosexual classification.

=== Research and use in literature ===
Narratophilia is typically referenced in literature and research in primarily three different contexts. In historical and terminological surveys of paraphilic nomenclature, where they trace how clinicians and researchers adopted and used terms such as narratophilia to describe their place in sexology. Many overviews of atypical sexual interests list narratophilia among a large range of sexual interests that are triggered by verbal stimulus. As well as surveys and epidemiological studies that include narratophilia among self-reported fantasies and interests.

== History ==
=== Origin of Concept ===
The origin of narratophilia is considered difficult to pinpoint due to the conflict between a modern clinical term and its ancient, unnamed presence in culture and literature. For centuries, paraphilia was framed as a sin and a crime through the dominant religious view in the Western world. Those who exhibit sexual interest and behaviors outside of procreation were deemed as sinners, a moral failure, and a criminal. These behaviors were often lumped together under the stigmatizing label of perversion or sexual deviation.

==== Shift to Clinical Study ====
In the late 19th century, sexologists like Richard von Krafft-Ebing began studying these behaviors, shifting them from "sin" to a medical condition. His work, Psychopathia Sexualis, was the first major attempt to catalog non-genital sexual interests as medical conditions. His book created the clinical framework for classifying and identifying sexual arousal, though Krafft-Ebing did not define narratophilia. This new profound clinical shift established the medical field's role in diagnosis, leading to early interventions like surgical castration (removal of one or both testicles), which are often considered to be severe.

==== Modern Clinical Distinction ====
With John Money's introduction to narratophilia in Lovemap, it was only considered for treatment if it rose to the level of a paraphilic disorder that causes distress or impairment to individuals, such as severe compulsion or distress over the behavior. Under current clinical standards, narratophilia is not listed as a distinct disorder in the American Psychiatric Association's DSM-5 (2013). Instead, it is classified under "other specified paraphilic disorder."

This distinction means that individuals who experience narratopohilia generally do not face the same intense treatment as those diagnosed with severe paraphilic disorders, such as pedophilic disorder or sexual sadism disorder. In some cases, Luteinizing Hormone-Releasing Hormone (LHRH) agonists, which chemically suppress testosterone to below castration levels, were used as a treatment for those with the highest risk of sexual offending due to their severe side effects. Narratophilia is typically managed, if at all, through psychotherapy or counseling focused on associated distress.

=== Development ===
Despite the medicalization and intense moral scrutiny, narratophilia offered a discreet and private form of eroticism that circumvented the public censorship and policing applied to visual pornography or overtly sexual behaviors. Audio erotica is nearly as old as the phonograph itself, with historians noting the existence of ribald material on phonographic cylinders from the 1890s. This was a collection of both amateur and commercial audio recordings that discussed the topics of sex. However, the recordings were targeted for prosecution under the Comstock Act of 1873 and were later referred to as "pornophony."

==== Post-War HI FI Culture ====
A less formal history of narratophilic experience existed long before the term. Following World War II, many American men developed an interest in high-fidelity audio equipment, a hobby connected to their wartime electronics training. The home hi-fi stereo became a male status, and magazines marketed audio enthusiasts as "high, masculine, individualistic art," while watching television was regarded as "low, feminine, mass entertainment." These recordings used the new, clearer, longer-playing audio format to simulate sex, erotic environments, or male-only spaces, and this technical clarity made the men feel more "hard core."

==== Vinyl erotica ====
Mid-century "party records" and bachelor-pad erotica demonstrate that forms of narratophilic arousal predate the modern clinical term. As the adult record market expanded, party records, stag LPs, and records were sold under the counter. These records allowed the forbidden language and sexual themes that were absent from mainstream media.

The transition from 78 rpm "blue discs," which relied mostly on dirty jokes and innuendo, to 33⅓ rpm LPs allowed extended vocal performances and immersive erotic storytelling. These LPs often employed what scholars called porno-performativity, which contains spoken seduction scenes, explicit sex scenes, heavy breathing, and moans. Notably, even educational and therapeutic LPs of the 1960s and 1970s (such as The Sensuous Woman or The Pleasures of Love) blurred the lines between instruction and erotic performance, demonstrating how sexualized vocality permeated both entertainment and sexology.

==== 21st century ====
In recent decades, with the rise of digital communication, erotica, and audio-based intimacy (such as ASMR, erotic podcasts, audio description porn, and erotic audios), narratophilia has gained renewed attention as a distinct expression of human sexuality. These contemporary practices continue the long tradition of erotic storytelling and the relationship between narration, imagination, and arousal.
