= Baron Macpherson of Drumochter =

Barony in the Peerage of the United Kingdom

Baron Macpherson of Drumochter, of Great Warley in the County of Essex, is a title in the Peerage of the United Kingdom. It was created in 1951 for the Scottish businessman, public servant and Labour politician Thomas Macpherson. He had previously represented Romford in Parliament. As of 2013 the title is held by his grandson, the third Baron, who succeeded his father in 2008. His heir is his son, the Hon. Daniel Thomas Macpherson, b. 23 January 2013.

== Barons Macpherson of Drumochter (1951) ==
- Thomas Macpherson, 1st Baron Macpherson of Drumochter (1888–1965)
- (James) Gordon Macpherson, 2nd Baron Macpherson of Drumochter (1924–2008)
- James Anthony Macpherson, 3rd Baron Macpherson of Drumochter (b. 1979)

The heir apparent is the present holder's son Hon. Daniel Thomas Macpherson (b. 2013).

== Arms ==
Coat of arms of Baron Macpherson of Drumochter
Crest "A wildcat sejant guardant proper holding a cross-crosslet fitchée gules." Escutcheon "Arms Per fesse or and azure, a lymphad sail furled flags and pennon flying counter-changed between in chief a dexter hand fessewise couped at the wrist grasping a dagger point upwards, and a cross-crosslet fitchée gules, and in base an oak tree eradicated proper fructed or." Supporters "Dexter: a lion gules, gorged with a collar, pendent therefrom an escutcheon or, charged with a garb azure; Sinister: a bull gules, armed and unguled azure, gorged with a collar pendent therefrom an escutcheon gold charged with a boar's head couped also azure." Motto Above the Crest: Touch Not This Cat But A Glove; Below the Arms: If There's No Ripple at the Bow There's Something Wrong
