= William Guyer Hunter =

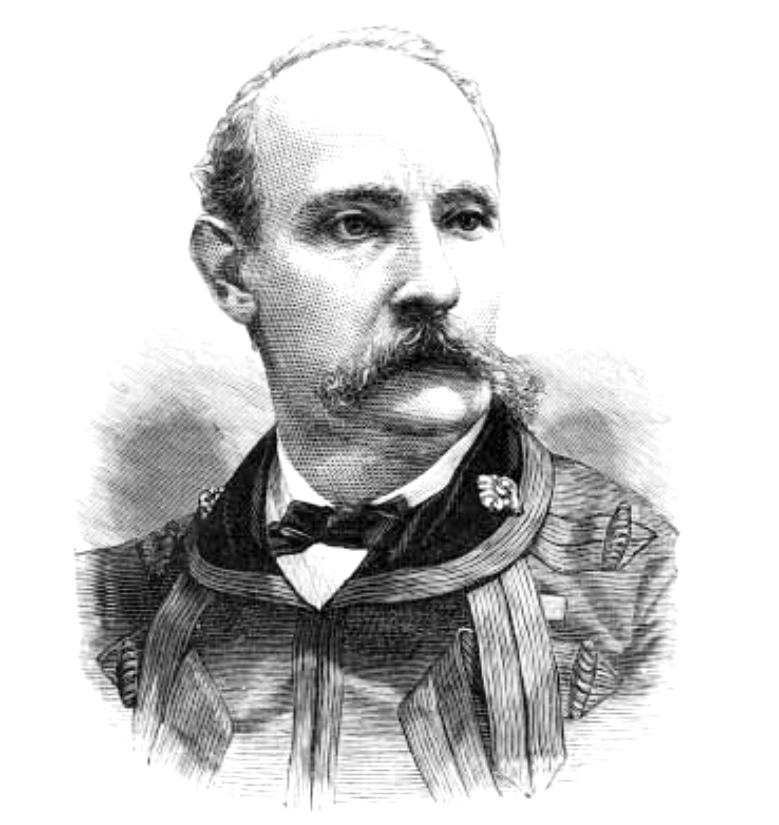

Sir William Guyer Hunter, KCMG, FRCP (1829 – 14 March 1902) was a British surgeon-general in India, principal of medical colleges and Conservative politician. He took part in official enquiries into vaccination and cholera.

== Life ==
Hunter was born at Calcutta, India, and was educated at King's College London and Aberdeen University. He began his training at Charing Cross Hospital in 1844 at the same time as Thomas Henry Huxley and Joseph Fayrer, and passed, in 1850, into the Bombay medical department as an assistant-surgeon. He became Principal of Grant Medical College in 1866, a post he held for ten years. He was appointed Vice Chancellor of Bombay University in 1880 by Sir Richard Temple.

He returned to London and was a member of the Royal Commission on Vaccination which was initiated in 1879 and sat for seven years. Hunter was surgeon to the Queen in 1881. In 1883 there was an outbreak of cholera in Egypt which had fallen under British jurisdiction in the previous year. There was an international dispute as to whether the disease was brought from Calcutta and hence should be dealt with by quarantine or whether it was indigenous. Hunter was sent as a medical commissioner and concluded "Facts…lead to the conclusion that cholera, be it called by whatever name it may…has existed in Egypt for some time past…In order to obtain as much information as possible on the subject above referred to, instructions have been issued to the medical officers recently arrived from England to institute cautious and careful inquiry". The following year he was appointed a Knight Commander of the Order of St Michael and St George (KCMG) for his services in Egypt.

In the 1885 general election, Hunter was elected MP for Hackney Central and held the seat until the 1892 general election.

Hunter married first, in 1856, a daughter of Rev. C. Packe, Vicar of Ruislip; and second, in 1871, Mary Louisa, daughter of Joseph Stainburn. His elder daughter Lilian Mary Hunter married in 1902 Charles Hunter Ward, son of Commander C. T. Ward.

He died at Anerley Hill, Upper Norwood, on 14 March 1902.

Parliament of the United Kingdom
New constituency see Hackney	Member of Parliament for Hackney Central; 1885 – 1892	Succeeded by Andrew Richard Scoble
