= Albert Spicer =

Sir Albert Spicer 1st Baronet
- Sir Albert Spicer

Member of Parliament for Monmouth Boroughs (1892–1900)

1st Baronet
- In office 1892–1900
- Preceded by: Sir George Elliot
- Succeeded by: Frederick Rutherfoord Harris

Member of Parliament for Hackney Central (1906–1918)
- In office 1906–1918
- Preceded by: Augustus Henry Eden Allhusen
- Succeeded by: William James Uglow Woolcock

Personal details
- Born: 16 March 1847
- Died: 20 December 1934 (aged 87) Bayswater, London, England
- Party: Liberal
- Spouse: Jessie Stewart Dykes
- Children: Albert, Marion, Bertha, Grace, Stewart Dykes, Janet, Lancelot, Gwendoline Elaine, Eva, Olga, Ursula
- Occupation: Businessman, Politician
- Known for: Founder of James Spicer & Sons (Spicers Ltd), Member of Parliament

Sir Albert Spicer, 1st Baronet PC (16 March 1847 – 20 December 1934) was an English businessman and Liberal Party politician.

He was born in Brixton, London, the son of James Spicer D.L. of Alton, Hampshire (1807–1888), a wealthy paper merchant and a well-known congregationalist, and Louisa Edwards (1813–1892), daughter of Evan Edwards and Mary Ann Johnson. He was the sixth child in a family of ten, with three brothers and six sisters; he was the second son, after his brother James (great-grandfather of the Labour MP Harriet Harman).

When his father died in 1888, Albert inherited the paper company James Spicer & Sons (since 1922 Spicers Ltd) with his brother James, transforming it into the largest and most productive paper company in the world.

On 6 March 1879, he married Jessie Stewart Dykes, daughter of David Dykes and his wife Janet Buxton. They had eleven children, three boys and eight girls: Albert, Marion, Bertha, Grace, Stewart Dykes, Janet, Lancelot, Gwendoline Elaine, Eva, Olga and Ursula. He was created a Baronet in 1906, and served as Member of Parliament for the Monmouth Boroughs from 1892 to 1900, and for Hackney Central from 1906 to 1918. He was a J.P. for Essex and was appointed as a Privy Councillor in 1912.

He died aged 87 on 20 December 1934 at 24 Palace Road, Bayswater, London, and was cremated in Golders Green Crematorium on 21 December 1934. His wife had predeceased him. His title was inherited by his first son Albert, then, on his death in 1966, Stewart Dykes inherited the title. The paper trade was taken over by his son Lancelot Dykes Spicer (1893–1979).

== Sources ==
- Leigh Rayment's list of baronets
- Leigh Rayment's Historical List of MPs

Parliament of the United Kingdom
Preceded by Sir George Elliot	Member of Parliament for Monmouth Boroughs; 1892 – 1900	Succeeded by Frederick Rutherfoord Harris
Preceded by Augustus Henry Eden Allhusen	Member of Parliament for Hackney Central; 1906 – 1918	Succeeded by William James Uglow Woolcock
Baronetage of the United Kingdom
New creation	Baronet (of Lancaster Gate); 1906–1934	Succeeded by Albert Dykes Spicer
