= Michael Neubert =

British politician (1933–2014)

Sir Michael Neubert

Under-Secretary of State for the Armed Forces
- In office 19 December 1988 – 23 July 1990
- Prime Minister: Margaret Thatcher
- Preceded by: Roger Freeman
- Succeeded by: Arthur Gore

Vice-Chamberlain of the Household
- In office 26 July 1988 – 19 December 1988
- Prime Minister: Margaret Thatcher
- Preceded by: Tristan Garel-Jones
- Succeeded by: Tony Durant

Member of Parliament for Romford
- In office 28 February 1974 – 8 April 1997
- Preceded by: Dick Leonard
- Succeeded by: Eileen Gordon

Personal details
- Born: 3 September 1933
- Died: 3 January 2014 (aged 80) Cheltenham, Gloucestershire, England
- Party: Conservative

Sir Michael Jon Neubert (3 September 1933 – 3 January 2014) was Conservative MP for Romford from 1974 until 1997. His loss in the landslide 1997 general election was considered something of a surprise.

He was educated at Bromley Grammar School and Downing College, Cambridge, and worked as a travel and industrial consultant. He was a local councillor and alderman in Bromley 1960–1974 being council leader for a time and Mayor of Bromley in 1972.

He contested the parliamentary seat of Hammersmith North in 1966, and Romford in 1970, before being elected in February 1974. From 1983 he held several junior government posts, and was Under-Secretary of State for Defence Procurement at the Ministry of Defence 1989–1990.

In April 1990 he visited Gruinard Island to declare the island safe after World War II Anthrax experiments.

== Personal life ==
Neubert and his wife, Sally, had one son. He died on 3 January 2014, at the age of 80, in Cheltenham.

Political offices
Preceded by Tristan Garel-Jones	Vice-Chamberlain of the Household; 1988	Succeeded by Tony Durant
Parliament of the United Kingdom
Preceded by Dick Leonard	Member of Parliament for Romford; February 1974–1997	Succeeded by Eileen Gordon
