= Fred Watkins (politician) =

English politician (1883–1954)

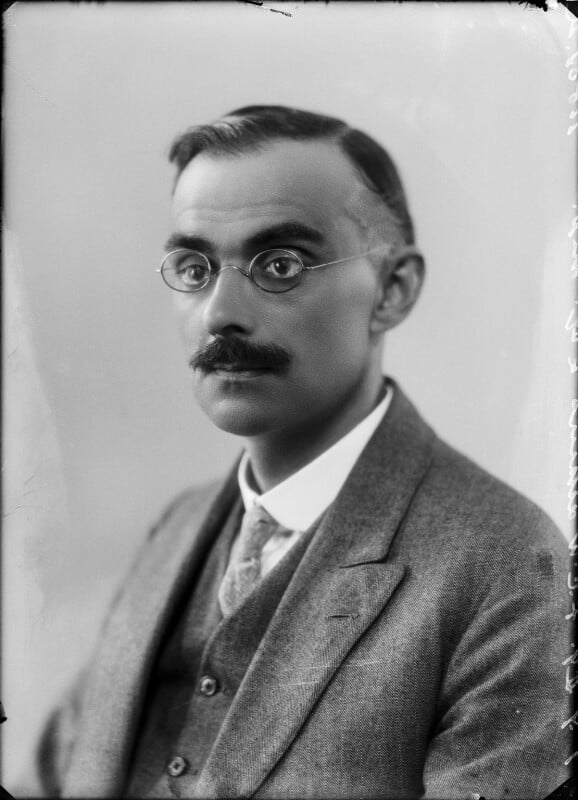
Watkins in 1929

Frederick Charles Watkins (24 February 1883 – 31 January 1954) was a Labour Party politician in England.

He was an unsuccessful candidate at the 1923 general election in Aylesbury. At the 1929 general election, he was elected as member of parliament (MP) for Hackney Central. He was defeated at the 1931 general election, but regained his seat in 1935 and served until he stood down at the 1945 general election.

== Sources ==
- Craig, F. W. S. (1983) [1969]. British parliamentary election results 1918-1949 (3rd ed.). Chichester: Parliamentary Research Services. ISBN 0-900178-06-X.
- Leigh Rayment's Historical List of MPs

Parliament of the United Kingdom
Preceded by Robert Gower	Member of Parliament for Hackney Central; 1929 – 1931	Succeeded by John Lockwood
Preceded by John Lockwood	Member of Parliament for Hackney Central; 1935 – 1945	Succeeded by Harry Hynd
Trade union offices
Preceded by Fred Simpson	President of the Railway Clerks' Association; 1937–1943	Succeeded by Percy Morris
