= Alfred Money-Wigram =

Member of Parliament for Romford
- In office 2 April 1894 – 16 January 1897
- Preceded by: James Theobald
- Succeeded by: Louis Sinclair

Personal details
- Born: 21 July 1866
- Died: 13 October 1899 (aged 33)
- Party: Conservative

Alfred Money-Wigram (sometimes Alfred Wigram, 21 July 1856 – 13 October 1899) was a British brewery company director, and Member of Parliament for the Romford division of Essex from 1894 to 1897.

== Biography ==
Money-Wigram was born on 21 July 1856. Look and Learn describes him as a "wealthy banker"; the International Brewers' Journal records an Alfred Money-Wigram as a shareholder in Reid's Brewery Company, and he is listed as a director of Reid's Brewery Company Limited in a successful 1894 taxation case before the High Court of Justice.

Alfred Money-Wigram was elected Conservative MP for Romford in an 1894 by-election on 2 April 1894 arising from the death of the incumbent Conservative MP, James Theobald. He retained the seat in the 1895 United Kingdom general election held from 13 July to 7 August 1895, but resigned his seat on 16 January 1897.

He died on 13 October 1899.

Parliament of the United Kingdom
Preceded by James Theobald	Member of Parliament for Romford; 1894–1897	Succeeded by Louis Sinclair
