= Eileen Gordon =

British Labour politician

Member of Parliament for Romford
- In office 1 May 1997 – 14 May 2001
- Preceded by: Michael Neubert
- Succeeded by: Andrew Rosindell

Personal details
- Born: Eileen Leatt; 22 October 1946 (age 79)
- Party: Labour
- Spouse: Tony Gordon (d. 2005)
- Children: 2
- Occupation: Politician

Eileen Gordon (née Leatt; born 22 October 1946) is a former Labour Member of Parliament in the United Kingdom, who represented Romford from 1997 to 2001.

== Early life and education ==
Gordon was born in Islington, the daughter of Charles and Margaret Rose Leatt (née Mallett). She was educated at Harold Hill Grammar School, Shoreditch Comprehensive School, and Westminster College, Oxford (Cert.Ed.).

== Career ==
She worked as a teacher for the Mawney School in Romford. At the 1986 local elections, Gordon and her husband Tony were the Labour candidates for Collier Row, centred on the area of that name in Havering (part of the Romford constituency). However, both council seats were held by the Conservative Party.

Gordon was an assistant to the Labour MP for West Ham, Tony Banks, from 1990 to 1997.

She contested the Conservative-held seat of Romford for Labour at the 1992 general election, but was unsuccessful. In 1994, she stood for election to Havering Council again, this time for Gidea Park (named for the area of the same name).

The 1992 general election had been her party's fourth loss in a row, but in 1997, as part of the landslide victory spearheaded by party leader Tony Blair, Gordon won Romford, becoming the first Labour elected MP for the seat since 1970. Whilst in Parliament, she was a member of the Broadcasting Select Committee from 1998 to 2001, and the Health Select Committee, from 1999 to 2001.

However, despite Blair winning a second term as Prime Minister at the subsequent 2001 election, Gordon lost her seat to the Conservative candidate Andrew Rosindell. It was one of the few Labour losses at that election, which saw her party retain its large majority from the 1997 election.

== Personal life ==
In 1969, Gordon married Tony Gordon; the couple had a son and daughter. Tony was elected to Havering Borough Council in 1990, representing Oldchurch in Romford until 1998. He died in 2005.

Parliament of the United Kingdom
Preceded by Michael Neubert	Member of Parliament for Romford; 1997–2001	Succeeded by Andrew Rosindell
