= Andrew Scoble =

Indian politician

Scoble in 1895.

Sir Andrew Richard Scoble, KCSI, PC, KC (1831–17 January 1916) was an English lawyer, politician and judge.

== Family ==
Andrew Scoble was born in London in 1831. His father was John Scoble, an English Congregational minister and later Canadian politician who was active in the British abolitionism movement from the 1830s to the 1850s, including assisting the integration of escaped American slaves into Canada. His brother, Thomas Clarkson Scoble, was an early advocate of the Hudson Bay Railway in Manitoba.

In 1863, Scoble married Augusta Hariette Nicholson.

== Education and professional life ==
Scoble was educated at the City of London School and was called to the Bar at Lincoln's Inn in 1856.

From 1870 to 1877, he served as the Advocate-General of Bombay, in which capacity he appeared regularly before the Bombay courts and served as an ex-officio member of the Bombay Legislative Council. He also served a one-year term as Dean of Law at the University of Bombay in 1871 and was appointed Queen's Counsel in 1876.

In his capacity as Advocate General, he led the prosecution in a notable state trial of Malhar Rao, Gaekwar Bahadur of Baroda, who was charged with attempting to poison the British Resident, Colonel Robert Phayre. The trial, before a special six-member Commission, lasted five weeks and ended in a split decision: the three British members were in favour of conviction, two of the Indian members held the prosecution was not proven, and the third Indian member voted for an acquittal. The Government resolved the issue by deposing the Gaekwar in favour of his twelve-year-old nephew, on the basis of alleged misgovernment.

From 1886 to 1891, Scoble was law member of the Council of the Governor-General of India and was responsible for introduction of the Age of Consent Act, 1891 in the house which eventually paved the way for the age of consent for sexual intercourse for all girls, married or unmarried, to be raised from ten to twelve years in all jurisdictions, its violation subject to criminal prosecution as rape. He was made a Companion of the Order of the Star of India in 1889 and the next year elevated to a Knight Companion of the order.

== Political activity ==
In 1886, Scoble stood unsuccessfully for the Conservative Party in a by-election in the constituency of Hackney South, coming in second, behind the Liberal candidate, Sir Charles Russell.

On his return to Britain, he was Conservative Member of Parliament for Hackney Central from 1892 until 1900.

In Parliament, he supported the proposal for leasehold enfranchisement in London, which would broaden the franchise to include tenants in leaseholds, a proposal advocated by Lord Randolph Churchill and other Conservatives. He was appointed a member of the Royal Commission on Indian civil and military expenditure. In 1899, he served as Treasurer of Lincoln's Inn.

== Judicial career ==
After leaving Parliament, Scoble was appointed to the Judicial Committee of the Privy Council in 1901.

== Death ==
Scoble was pre-deceased by his wife, Lady Augusta, who died in 1904. Scoble himself died at his residence, Chivelston, Parkside, Wimbledon Common, on 17 January 1916.

== Publications ==
Guizot’s History of English Revolution (translation).

Mignet’s History of Mary Queen of Scots (translation).

Parliament of the United Kingdom
Preceded by William Guyer Hunter	Member of Parliament for Hackney Central; 1892 – 1900	Succeeded by Augustus Allhusen
