= Ron Ledger =

Ronald Joseph Ledger (7 November 1920 – 11 December 2004) was a Labour Co-operative politician in the United Kingdom.

== Early life ==
Ledger was born in Tunbridge Wells and was raised in a Barnardo's orphanage after his father abandoned the family in 1923, during which time he was separated from his brother, sister, and pregnant mother. He was educated at Skinner's Grammar School and then at the University of Nottingham, where he founded the university's Labour Club and was its first chairman from 1948 to 1949.

He served with the Royal Air Force from 1942 to 1947.

== Politics ==
Ledger unsuccessfully contested Rushcliffe at the 1951 general election, and was a member of Hertfordshire County Council from 1952 to 1954.

He was elected at the 1955 general election as the Labour Co-operative member of parliament (MP) for Romford, and held the seat until he retired from Parliament at the 1970 general election.

Ledger was a director of the London Co-operative Society from 1961. He was later the owner of a casino, and served as chairman of the Hairdressing Council from 1966.

Parliament of the United Kingdom
Preceded by John Cutts Lockwood	Member of Parliament for Romford; 1955–1970	Succeeded by Dick Leonard
