= Augustus Henry Eden Allhusen =

British politician

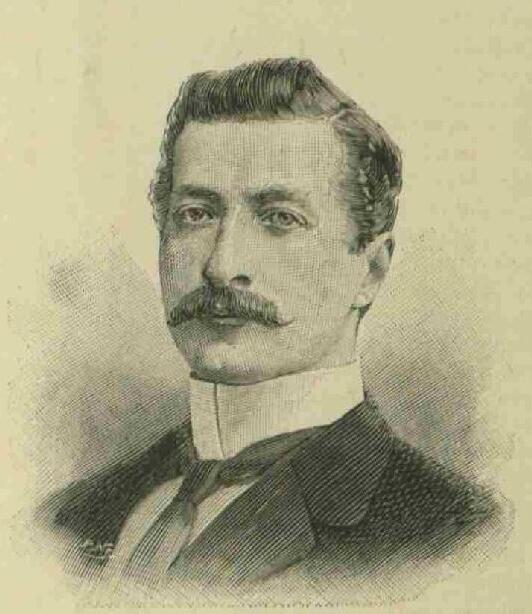
- Born: 1867
- Died: 25 May 1925 (aged 57–58)
- Occupation: Politician
- Spouse(s): Osma Mary Dorothy Stanley
- Position held: member of the 27th Parliament of the United Kingdom (1900–1906), member of the 26th Parliament of the United Kingdom (1897–1900), High Sheriff of Buckinghamshire (1913–1914)

Augustus Henry Eden Allhusen DL (20 August 1867 – 2 May 1925) was an English Conservative Party politician. He sat in the House of Commons from 1897 to 1906.

== Life ==
Allhusen was the son of Henry Christian Allhusen, son of Danish-born chemical magnate Christian Allhusen. Born in Gateshead, he was educated at Cheltenham College and at Trinity College, Cambridge (matriculated 1887, B.A. 1890).

He was commissioned in 1900 as a 2nd Lieutenant in the 1st Newcastle upon Tyne (Western division, Royal Garrison Artillery) Volunteers and later served as a lieutenant in the 2nd Royal Bucks Regiment of Yeomanry and as a Justice of the Peace for Buckinghamshire. He was elected at a by-election in January 1897 as the Member of Parliament (MP) for Salisbury, following the resignation of the Conservative MP Edward Hulse. He did not contest Salisbury at the 1900 general election, when he was elected as the MP for Hackney Central. He was defeated at the 1906 general election, and did not stand again.

He was appointed as a Deputy Lieutenant of Buckinghamshire in January 1897, and was High Sheriff of Buckinghamshire in 1913.

== Family ==
In 1897 he married Mary Dorothy Osma, daughter of Lieut.-Col. John Constantine Stanley and his wife Susan Elizabeth Mary Stewart-Mackenzie, a hostess and politician better known under her later name as Mary Jeune, Baroness St Helier.

Parliament of the United Kingdom
Preceded by Edward Hulse	Member of Parliament for Salisbury; 1897 – 1900	Succeeded by Walter Palmer
Preceded by Sir Andrew Scoble	Member of Parliament for Hackney Central; 1900 – 1906	Succeeded by Albert Spicer
