= Erotica (disambiguation) =

Erotica are works that deal with erotically stimulating or arousing descriptions.

The term Erotica may also refer to:

== Erotic art and entertainment ==
- Erotica (mural painting), depicting Love Poetry in the Literature series, Library of Congress Thomas Jefferson Building
- Erotica Expo, an annual adult entertainment convention held in Auckland, New Zealand
- Erotica UK, an annual adult entertainment convention held in London, England

== Music ==
=== Albums ===
- Erotica (Madonna album), 1992
- Erotica (The Darling Buds album), 1992
- Erótica, a 1981 album by Uruguayan jazz harpist Roberto Perera
- Erotica, a 2006 album by Serbian turbo-folk singer Marta Savić
- Erotica, a 2010 album by Bulgarian pop-folk singer Kamelia

=== Songs ===
- "Erotica" (song), 1992 single from Madonna's album Erotica
- "Erotica", jazz composition by Herb Alpert
- "Erotica", composition for wind quintet by José Serebrier
