= William Woolcock =

British politician

William Woolcock

William James Uglow Woolcock CMG CBE MP (1878 – 13 November 1947) was a Liberal Party politician in England.

During the First World War, he was Assistant Director of Army Contracts, followed by Chairman of Medical Stores Committee for the War Office. He was appointed an Officer of the Order of the British Empire in the 1918 New Year Honours and a Commander of the Order in the 1920 New Year Honours.

At the 1918 general election, he was elected unopposed as Coalition Liberal Member of Parliament (MP) for Hackney Central. He stood down at the 1922 general election, and did not stand for Parliament again.

He later served as Chairman of the Committee of Non-official Advisers associated with the Industrial Advisers of the United Kingdom Delegation at the Ottawa Conference. He was appointed a Companion of the Order of St Michael and St George in the 1933 New Year Honours.

== Sources ==
- Craig, F. W. S. (1983) [1969]. British parliamentary election results 1918-1949 (3rd ed.). Chichester: Parliamentary Research Services. ISBN 0-900178-06-X.

Parliament of the United Kingdom
| Preceded by Albert Spicer | Member of Parliament for Hackney Central; 1918–1922 | Succeeded by Sir Arthur Lever, Bt |
