= Samuel Woolf Magnus =

British politician

Samuel Woolf Magnus (30 September 1910 – 28 February 1992), was a judge and politician in both Britain and Zambia.

== Background ==
He was the son of Samuel Woolf Magnus. He was educated at University College, London where he received a BA Honors in 1931. He married, in 1938, Anna Gertrude Shane. They had one daughter.

== Professional career ==
Called to Bar, Gray’s Inn, 1937. Served War of 1939–45, Army. Practised in London, 1937–59; partner in legal firm, Northern Rhodesia, 1959–63; subseq. legal consultant. QC 1964, MLC 1962, Puisne Judge, High Court for Zambia, 1968. FCIArb 1987. He was Justice of Appeal, at the Court of Appeal for Zambia in 1971. He was Commissioner, of the Foreign Compensation Commission from 1977–83.

== Political career ==
He was Liberal Party candidate for the Central Hackney Division of London at the 1945 General Election.

General Election 1945: Hackney Central Electorate 33,531
Party	Candidate	Votes	%	±%
Labour	Henry Hynd	14,810	67.2	+15.6
Conservative	R.R. Harris	4,889	22.2	−26.2
Liberal	Lt. Samuel Woolf Magnus	2,348	10.6	n/a
Majority		9,921	45.0	+41.8
Turnout		22,047	65.7	+5.1
Labour hold		Swing	+18.9	

He was Treasurer of the Association of Liberal Lawyers. He was a Member of the Council of the London Liberal Party and President of North Hendon Liberal Association until 1959. He served as an MP January–October 1964 in Northern Rhodesia and an MP in Zambia from 1964–68. He was Chairman of the Law, Parliamentary and General Purposes Cttee of the Board of Deputies of British Jews from 1979–83.

== Publications ==
- (with M. Estrin) Companies Act 1947, 1947
- (with M. Estrin) Companies: Law and Practice, 1948, 5th edn 1978, and Supplement, 1981
- (with A. M. Lyons) Advertisement Control, 1949
- Magnus on Leasehold Property (Temporary Provisions) Act 1951, 1951
- Magnus on Landlord and Tenant Act 1954, 1954
- Magnus on Housing Repairs and Rents Act 1954, 1954
- Magnus on the Rent Act 1957, 1957
- (with F. E. Price) Knight’s Annotated Housing Acts, 1958
- (with Tovell) Magnus on Housing Finance, 1960
- (with M. Estrin) Companies Act 1967, 1967
- Magnus on the Rent Act 1968, 1969
- Magnus on Business Tenancies, 1970
- Magnus on the Rent Act 1977, 1978
- Butterworth’s Company Forms Manual, 1987
- contributor: Law Jl; Halsbury’s Laws of England; Encycl. of Forms and Precedents; Atkin’s Court Forms and Precedents
