= James Theobald (politician) =

British politician (1829–1894)

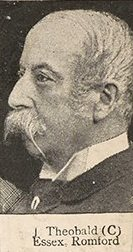

Member of Parliament for Romford, Essex
- In office 1 July 1886 – 10 March 1894
- Preceded by: John Westlake
- Succeeded by: Alfred Wigram

Personal details
- Born: 1829
- Died: 1894 (aged 64–65)
- Party: Conservative

James Theobald (1829–10 March 1894) was a British Conservative politician from Essex, who represented Romford in the House of Commons of the United Kingdom from 1886 to 1894.

== Biography ==
James Theobald of Grays Thurrock and of Havering atte Bower, Essex, was the eldest son of James Theobald of Hyde Abbey in Hampshire, and Sarah, daughter of the Reverend Charles Richards, Canon of Winchester. He was born in Winchester in 1829. He was educated at Trinity College, Oxford, where he matriculated 30 May 1849, aged nineteen. He took his B.A. and M.A. in 1859, and became a student of the Inner Temple in 1851.

In 1865 Theobald married Mable Laura, daughter of W.R. Eaton Esq. of Cheshire. He was Deputy Lieutenant for Essex, Lord of the Manor of Grays Thurrock and a large landowner in the county.

In 1856, James Theobald was part of the expedition led by Robert Stuart to the summit of Mount Ararat, along with Major Alick Fraser, the Rev. Walter Thursby and John Evans.

He was commissioned as a Lieutenant in the Hampshire Militia on 4 May 1861 and was promoted to Captain on 19 May 1864, before retiring in 1869.

A Conservative, and opposed to home rule, he represented the Romford Division of Essex in Parliament from 1886 to 1894. He entered parliament on the Conservative ticket for Romford at the 1886 general election, and was reportedly very popular and hard working.

== Death ==
On 9 March 1894, Theobald was at Romford Station to catch the 2:16pm train to London. He attempted to board it, but the train had already started moving, and he fell between the footboard and the platform. Station staff stopped the train and pulled the injured Theobald free. He was, at his own request, carried on a stretcher to the Golden Lion Hotel. Two local doctors and a surgeon from Guy's Hospital diagnosed four fractured ribs and wounds to the head and body, as well as internal injuries. After a brief rally, James Theobald died at 6.02 the next morning.
