= Romford (constituency) =

Parliamentary constituency in the United Kingdom, 1885 onwards

Coordinates: 51.588°N 0.187°E

- Borough constituency for the House of Commons
- Interactive map of boundaries since 2024
- County: Greater London
- Population: 107,064 (2020 mid-year estimate)
- Electorate: 73,730 (March 2020)

Current constituency
- Created: 1885
- Member of Parliament: Andrew Rosindell (Reform UK)
- Seats: One
- Created from: South Essex
- During its existence contributed to new seat(s) of: East Ham North (1918); East Ham South (1918); Ilford (1918); Leyton East (1918); Barking (1945); Dagenham (1945); Hornchurch (1945); Billericay (1955); Upminster (1974)

Romford is a constituency (Note: A borough constituency (for the purposes of election expenses and type of returning officer).) in Greater London represented in the House of Commons of the UK Parliament since 2001 by Andrew Rosindell. Rosindell was elected as a Conservative but defected to Reform UK in January 2026. (Note: As with all constituencies, the constituency elects one Member of Parliament (MP) by the first past the post system of election at least every five years.)

It was created in 1885 and was subject to significant changes in boundaries in 1918 and 1945. It initially covered a huge swathe of what is now East London, with parts of the constituency progressively removed as they experienced significant increases in population as London expanded. The constituency has more or less coincided with the town of Romford since 1955.

== Constituency profile ==
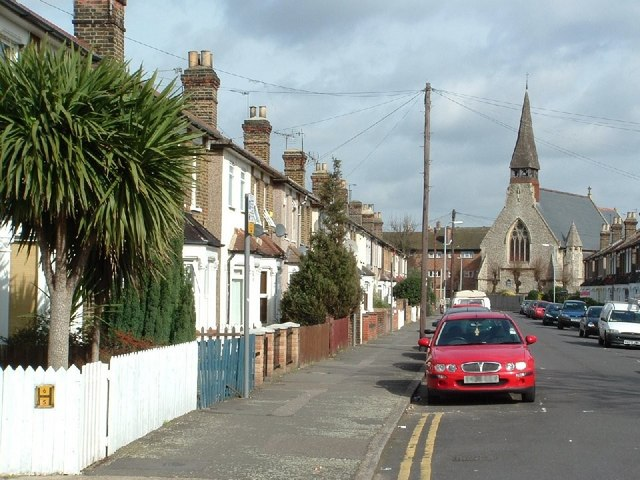
Cotleigh Road, Romford

Romford is a constituency in Greater London in England, within the Borough of Havering. It covers the town of Romford and parts of the neighbouring town of Hornchurch.

Romford is a large, suburban town, located around 14 miles (23 km) east of the centre of London. Traditionally a rural market town, Romford underwent large-scale suburban development during the interwar period. Today, the town is one of Outer London's major retail and entertainment centres and is served by the Elizabeth line. Overall, this constituency has average levels of wealth; there is some deprivation in Romford town centre, where most residents live in dense flats, whilst the outer suburbs are more affluent with many semi-detached homes. These outer neighbourhoods include the wealthy Gidea Park, an Edwardian housing estate. House prices across the constituency are generally lower than the rest of London but higher than the UK average.

Romford has a low population of older adults and an above-average proportion of working-age adults with families. Residents have high levels of income and homeownership and the child poverty rate is low. They have low levels of education and a high proportion work in the health and construction sectors. The percentage of residents claiming unemployment benefits is above-average. White people made up 72% of the population at the 2021 census. Asians were 13% of residents and Black people were 8%.

At the local borough council, all seats in this constituency are represented by Reform UK councillors. Voters in Romford strongly supported leaving the European Union in the 2016 referendum; an estimated 68% voted in favour of Brexit compared to the UK-wide figure of 52%, making Romford one of the top 40 most Brexit-supporting constituencies out of 650 nationwide according to Electoral Calculus.

== Boundaries ==
=== Historic ===
Map of boundaries 2010–2024

1885–1918: The Liberty of Havering-atte-Bower, and part of the Sessional Division of Becontree.

1918–1945: The Urban Districts of Barking and Romford, and the Rural District of Romford.

1945–1950: The Borough of Romford.

1950–1955: The Borough of Romford, and the Urban District of Brentwood.

1955–1974: The Borough of Romford.

1974–1983: The London Borough of Havering wards of Bedfords, Central, Collier Row, Gidea Park, Heath Park, Mawney, and Oldchurch.

1983–1997: The London Borough of Havering wards of Brooklands, Chase Cross, Collier Row, Gidea Park, Heath Park, Mawney, Oldchurch, Rise Park, and St Edward's.

1997–2010: The London Borough of Havering wards of Ardleigh Green, Brooklands, Chase Cross, Collier Row, Gidea Park, Heath Park, Mawney, Oldchurch, Rise Park, and St Edward's.

2010–2024: The London Borough of Havering wards of Brooklands, Havering Park, Hylands, Mawneys, Pettits, Romford Town, and Squirrel's Heath.

NB: Contents, but not the boundaries of the constituency, were changed as a result of a local government boundary review which came into effect in May 2022.

=== Current ===
Romford from 2024

Further to the 2023 review of Westminster constituencies, the composition of the constituency was, from the 2024 general election onward, expanded slightly to include parts of the Emerson Park ward (as it existed on 1 December 2020), primarily that part of polling district EM2 to the west of the River Ravensbourne.

Following this minor change, as well as reflecting the 2022 local government review, the constituency now comprises the following wards of the London Borough of Havering from the 2024 general election:

- Havering-atte-Bower; Hylands and Harrow Lodge; Marshalls and Rise Park; Mawneys; Rush Green and Crowlands; St Alban's; St Edward's; Squirrels Heath.

== History ==
This seat was created in the Redistribution of Seats Act 1885. It included the civil parishes of Havering-atte-Bower, Hornchurch and Romford which together formed the Liberty of Havering-atte-Bower, combined with Barking (including Great Ilford), Dagenham, East Ham, Little Ilford and Wanstead. The 1918 revision removed the populous county borough of East Ham (including Little Ilford) and the municipal borough of Ilford. Wanstead became part of the Epping constituency. The parishes of Cranham, Great Warley and Upminster were gained from Chelmsford and Rainham and Wennington were gained from South East Essex. The Romford constituency then comprised the parishes of Barking, Cranham, Dagenham, Great Warley, Havering-atte-Bower, Hornchurch, Noak Hill, Rainham, Romford, Upminster and Wennington.

At the 1935 general election there were 167,939 people registered to vote, making Romford the largest constituency in the country. By 1939 this had risen to 207,101, although Hendon had become larger. The House of Commons (Redistribution of Seats) Act 1944 caused the constituency to be divided. The revised boundary coincided with the municipal borough of Romford, which had been enlarged in the 1930s to include Havering-atte-Bower and Noak Hill. The Brentwood Urban District, which had been expanded in the 1930s to include Hutton, Ingrave and South Weald, was included in the constituency from 1950 to 1955. Harold Hill was removed from the constituency in 1974. The constituency shared boundaries with the Romford electoral division for election of councillors to the Greater London Council at elections in 1973, 1977 and 1981. Subsequent boundary revisions have been relatively minor, with Ardleigh Green gained from Upminster in 1997 and Hylands gained from Hornchurch in 2010.

== Members of Parliament ==
Sir John Bethell

Although Romford was, through much of the 20th century, highly marginal in terms of majorities obtained, its boundaries have changed significantly. It has been Conservative since the February 1974 general election, except for the 1997 landslide. It was one of the few Conservative gains in 2001. The 2015 result made the seat the 157th-safest of the Conservative Party's 331 seats by percentage of majority.

Election	Member	Party	Notes
1885	John Westlake	Liberal	
1886	James Theobald	Conservative	Died March 1894
1894 by-election	Alfred Money-Wigram	Conservative	Resigned January 1897
1897 by-election	Louis Sinclair	Conservative	
1906	John Bethell	Liberal	
1916	John Bethell	National Liberal	Contested East Ham North following redistribution
Constituency split into five parts, forming the new seats of East Ham North, East Ham South, Ilford and Leyton East
1918	Albert Edward Martin	Coalition Liberal	
1922	Albert Edward Martin	National Liberal	
Nov 1923	Albert Edward Martin	Conservative	
Dec 1923	Charles Rhys	Conservative	Parliamentary Private Secretary to the Prime Minister (1927–1929)
1929	H. T. Muggeridge	Labour	
1931	William Hutchison	Conservative	
1935	John Parker	Labour	Contested Dagenham following redistribution
Constituency split into four parts, forming the new seats of Barking, Dagenham and Hornchurch
1945	Thomas Macpherson	Labour	
1950	John Lockwood	Conservative	Member for Hackney Central (1931–1935)
1955	Ron Ledger	Labour Co-op	
1970	Dick Leonard	Labour	
Constituency split, minority merged with part of Hornchurch to form the new seat of Upminster
Feb 1974	Michael Neubert	Conservative	
1997	Eileen Gordon	Labour	
2001	Andrew Rosindell	Conservative	
2026	Andrew Rosindell	Reform	

== Election results 2024–present ==
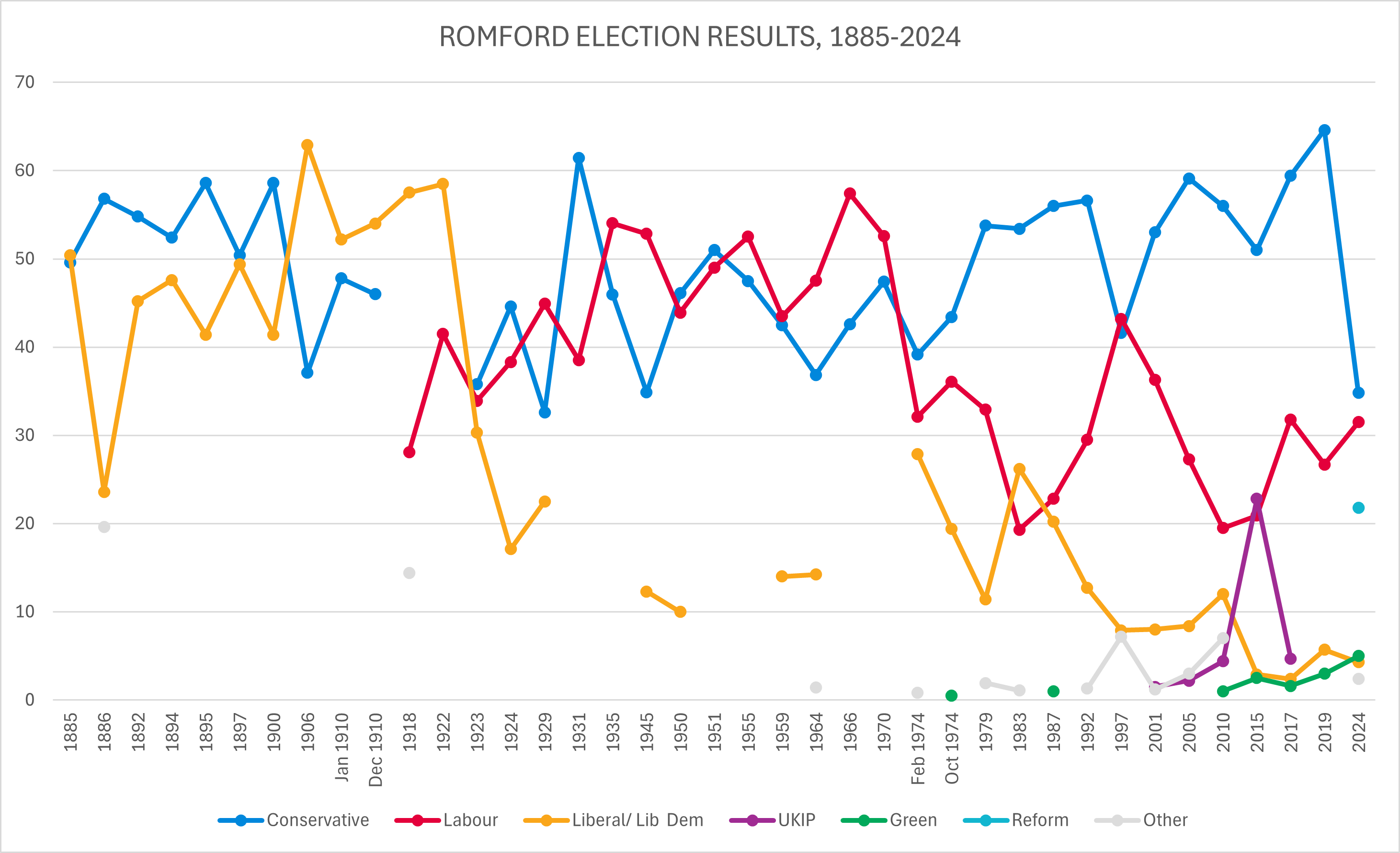
Election results 1885–2024

=== Elections in the 2020s ===
General election 2024: Romford
Party	Candidate	Votes	%	±%
Conservative	Andrew Rosindell	15,339	34.8	▼30.0
Labour	Andrew Achilleos	13,876	31.5	▲5.1
Reform	Philip Hyde	9,624	21.8	N/A
Green	David Hughes	2,220	5.0	▲2.0
Liberal Democrats	Thomas Clarke	1,895	4.3	▼1.5
Workers Party	Zhafaran Qayum	898	2.0	N/A
English Constitution Party	Colin Birch	195	0.4	N/A
Majority		1,463	3.3	▼35.0
Turnout		44,047	60.4	▼5.2
Registered electors		72,978		
Conservative hold		Swing	▼17.6	

2019 notional result
Party	Vote	%
Conservative	31,322	64.8
Labour	12,786	26.4
Liberal Democrats	2,789	5.8
Green	1,462	3.0
Turnout	48,359	65.6
Electorate	73,730	

== Election results 2010–2024 ==
=== Elections in the 2010s ===
General election 2019: Romford
Party	Candidate	Votes	%	±%
Conservative	Andrew Rosindell	30,494	64.6	+5.2
Labour	Angelina Leatherbarrow	12,601	26.7	−5.1
Liberal Democrats	Ian Sanderson	2,708	5.7	+3.3
Green	David Hughes	1,428	3.0	+1.4
Majority		17,893	37.9	+10.3
Turnout		47,231	65.3	−2.7
Registered electors		72,350		
Conservative hold		Swing	+5.1	

General election 2017: Romford
Party	Candidate	Votes	%	±%
Conservative	Andrew Rosindell	29,671	59.4	+8.4
Labour	Angelina Leatherbarrow	15,893	31.8	+10.9
UKIP	Andrew Beadle	2,350	4.7	−18.1
Liberal Democrats	Ian Sanderson	1,215	2.4	−0.5
Green	David Hughes	815	1.6	−0.9
Majority		13,778	27.6	−0.6
Turnout		49,944	68.0	+0.3
Registered electors		73,493		
Conservative hold		Swing	−1.4	

General election 2015: Romford
Party	Candidate	Votes	%	±%
Conservative	Andrew Rosindell	25,067	51.0	−5.0
UKIP	Gerard Batten	11,208	22.8	+18.4
Labour	Sam Gould	10,268	20.9	+1.4
Liberal Democrats	Ian Sanderson	1,413	2.9	−9.1
Green	Lorna Tooley	1,222	2.5	+1.5
Majority		13,859	28.2	−8.3
Turnout		49,178	67.7	+2.4
Registered electors		72,594		
Conservative hold		Swing	−11.7	

General election 2010: Romford
Party	Candidate	Votes	%	±%
Conservative	Andrew Rosindell	26,031	56.0	−1.7
Labour	Rachel Voller	9,077	19.5	−9.5
Liberal Democrats	Helen Duffett	5,572	12.0	+3.6
BNP	Robert Bailey	2,438	5.2	+2.7
UKIP	Gerard Batten	2,050	4.4	+2.1
English Democrat	Peter Thorogood	603	1.3	N/A
Green	Gerry Haines	447	1.0	N/A
Independent	Philip Hyde	151	0.3	N/A
Independent	David Sturman	112	0.2	N/A
Majority		16,954	36.5	+7.9
Turnout		46,481	65.2	+3.2
Registered electors		71,306		+4.2
Conservative hold		Swing	+3.9	

2005 notional result
Party	Vote	%
Conservative	24,442	57.7
Labour	12,322	29.1
Liberal Democrats	3,572	8.4
BNP	1,088	2.6
UKIP	965	2.3
Turnout	42,389	61.9
Electorate	68,425	

== Election results 1997–2010 ==
=== Elections in the 2000s ===
General election 2005: Romford
Party	Candidate	Votes	%	±%
Conservative	Andrew Rosindell	21,560	59.1	+6.1
Labour	Margaret Mullane	9,971	27.3	−9.0
Liberal Democrats	Geoff M. Seeff	3,066	8.4	+0.4
BNP	John McCaffrey	1,088	3.0	+1.8
UKIP	Terry P. Murray	797	2.2	+0.7
Majority		11,589	31.8	+15.1
Turnout		36,482	62.3	+2.7
Registered electors		58,540		
Conservative hold		Swing	+7.5	

General election 2001: Romford
Party	Candidate	Votes	%	±%
Conservative	Andrew Rosindell	18,931	53.0	+11.4
Labour	Eileen Gordon	12,954	36.3	−6.9
Liberal Democrats	Nigel Meyer	2,869	8.0	+0.1
UKIP	Steven Ward	533	1.5	–1.9
BNP	Frank McAllister	414	1.2	–0.1
Majority		5,977	16.7	N/A
Turnout		35,701	59.6	−11.4
Registered electors		59,893		
Conservative gain from Labour		Swing	+9.1	

=== Elections in the 1990s ===
General election 1997: Romford
Party	Candidate	Votes	%	±%
Labour	Eileen Gordon	18,187	43.2	+14.8
Conservative	Michael Neubert	17,538	41.6	−16.5
Liberal Democrats	Nigel Meyer	3,341	7.9	−4.5
Referendum	Steven Ward	1,431	3.4	N/A
Liberal	Terry E. Hurlstone	1,100	2.6	N/A
BNP	Michael J. Carey	522	1.2	N/A
Majority		649	1.6	N/A
Turnout		42,119	71.1	−6.6
Registered electors		59,276		
Labour gain from Conservative		Swing	+15.6	

1992 notional result
Party	Vote	%
Conservative	27,462	58.1
Labour	13,398	28.3
Liberal Democrats	5,865	12.4
Others	546	1.2
Turnout	47,271	77.6
Electorate	60,903	

== Election results 1974–1997 ==
=== Elections in the 1990s ===
General election 1992: Romford
Party	Candidate	Votes	%	±%
Conservative	Michael Neubert	23,834	56.6	+0.6
Labour	Eileen Gordon	12,414	29.5	+6.7
Liberal Democrats	Pat A. Atherton	5,329	12.7	−7.5
Green	Frederick Gibson	546	1.3	+0.3
Majority		11,420	27.1	−6.1
Turnout		42,123	78.0	+5.1
Registered electors		54,001		
Conservative hold		Swing	−3.7	

=== Elections in the 1980s ===
General election 1987: Romford
Party	Candidate	Votes	%	±%
Conservative	Michael Neubert	22,745	56.0	+2.6
Labour	Nigel Smith	9,274	22.8	+3.5
Liberal	John Bates	8,195	20.2	−6.0
Green	Frederick Gibson	385	1.0	N/A
Majority		13,471	33.2	+6.0
Turnout		40,599	72.9	+3.1
Registered electors		55,668		
Conservative hold		Swing	−0.5	

General election 1983: Romford
Party	Candidate	Votes	%	±%
Conservative	Michael Neubert	20,771	53.4	−0.4
Liberal	John Bates	10,197	26.2	+14.8
Labour	Jack Hoepelman	7,494	19.3	−13.6
National Front	Madelaine P. Caine	432	1.1	−0.8
Majority		10,574	27.2	+6.3
Turnout		38,894	69.8	−6.81
Registered electors		55,758		
Conservative hold		Swing	−7.6	

=== Elections in the 1970s ===
General election 1979: Romford
Party	Candidate	Votes	%	±%
Conservative	Michael Neubert	22,714	53.8	+10.3
Labour	Suzanne Bartlett	13,902	32.9	−3.8
Liberal	John Hayward Bates	4,818	11.4	−8.0
National Front	Madelaine P. Caine	820	1.9	N/A
Majority		8,812	20.9	+14.2
Turnout		42,254	76.6	+5.2
Registered electors		55,154		
Conservative hold		Swing	+7.1	

General election October 1974: Romford
Party	Candidate	Votes	%	±%
Conservative	Michael Neubert	17,164	43.4	+4.3
Labour	D.R. O'Flynn	14,513	36.7	+4.6
Liberal	Terry E. Hurlstone	7,663	19.4	−8.5
PEOPLE	L. C. H. Sampson	200	0.5	N/A
Majority		2,651	6.7	−0.3
Turnout		39,540	71.5	−8.4
Registered electors		55,337		
Conservative hold		Swing	−0.2	

General election February 1974: Romford
Party	Candidate	Votes	%	±%
Conservative	Michael Neubert	17,134	39.2	−20.4
Labour	D.R. O'Flynn	14,061	32.1	−8.3
Liberal	Terry E. Hurlstone	12,190	27.9	N/A
Independent	E. Bates	374	0.9	N/A
Majority		3,073	7.0	N/A
Turnout		43,759	79.9	+13.6
Registered electors		54,790		
Conservative hold		Swing	–6.1	

1970 notional result
Party	Vote	%
Conservative	22,400	59.6
Labour	15,200	40.4
Turnout	37,600	66.3
Electorate	56,718	

== Election results 1955–1974 ==
=== Elections in the 1970s ===
General election 1970: Romford
Party	Candidate	Votes	%	±%
Labour	Richard Leonard	27,899	52.60	−4.81
Conservative	Michael Neubert	25,139	47.40	+4.81
Majority		2,760	5.20	−9.62
Turnout		53,038	66.76	−8.68
Registered electors		79,448		
Labour hold		Swing	+4.8	

=== Elections in the 1960s ===
General election 1966: Romford
Party	Candidate	Votes	%	±%
Labour Co-op	Ron Ledger	31,221	57.41	+9.90
Conservative	Brian James Higgs	23,160	42.59	+5.75
Majority		8,061	14.82	+4.15
Turnout		54,381	75.44	−2.32
Registered electors		72,089		
Labour Co-op hold		Swing	+2.1	

General election 1964: Romford
Party	Candidate	Votes	%	±%
Labour Co-op	Ron Ledger	27,143	47.51	+4.00
Conservative	Antony T.R. Fletcher	21,046	36.84	−5.64
Liberal	Douglas Geary	8,133	14.24	+0.23
Ratepayer	Edgar Bates	811	1.42	N/A
Majority		6,097	10.67	+9.64
Turnout		56,322	77.76	−2.61
Registered electors		73,473		
Labour Co-op hold		Swing	+4.8	

=== Elections in the 1950s ===
General election 1959: Romford
Party	Candidate	Votes	%	±%
Labour Co-op	Ron Ledger	25,558	43.51	−9.01
Conservative	Richard Jon Stanley Harvey	24,951	42.48	−5.00
Liberal	Douglas Geary	8,228	14.01	N/A
Majority		607	1.03	−4.02
Turnout		58,737	80.37	+5.91
Registered electors		73,082		
Labour Co-op hold		Swing		

General election 1955: Romford
Party	Candidate	Votes	%
Labour Co-op	Ron Ledger	27,326	52.52
Conservative	Richard Jon Stanley Harvey	24,701	47.48
Majority		2,625	5.04
Turnout		52,027	75.46
Registered electors		68,942	
Labour Co-op win (new boundaries)			

== Election results 1945–1955 ==
=== Elections in the 1950s ===
General election 1951: Romford
Party	Candidate	Votes	%	±%
Conservative	John Lockwood	33,120	51.00	+4.90
Labour	Arthur Creech Jones	31,822	49.00	+5.10
Majority		1,298	2.00	−0.20
Turnout		64,942	83.81	−1.89
Registered electors		77,483		
Conservative hold		Swing		

General election 1950: Romford
Party	Candidate	Votes	%
Conservative	John Lockwood	27,656	46.1
Labour	Thomas Macpherson	26,387	43.9
Liberal	Norman Clarke	6,014	10.0
Majority		1,269	2.2
Turnout		60,057	85.7
Registered electors		70,204	
Conservative win (new boundaries)			

=== Elections in the 1940s ===
General election 1945: Romford
Party	Candidate	Votes	%
Labour	Thomas Macpherson	16,979	52.83
Conservative	Montague Lavander Berryman	11,202	34.86
Liberal	Henry John G Hare	3,957	12.31
Majority		5,777	17.97
Turnout		32,138	74.62
Registered electors		43,070	
Labour win (new boundaries)			

== Election results 1918–1945 ==
=== Elections in the 1930s ===
General election 1935: Romford
Party	Candidate	Votes	%	±%
Labour	John Parker	55,723	54.03	+15.49
Conservative	William Hutchison	47,416	45.97	−15.49
Majority		8,307	8.06	N/A
Turnout		103,139	61.41	−3.90
Registered electors		167,939		
Labour gain from Conservative		Swing		

General election 1931: Romford
Party	Candidate	Votes	%	±%
Conservative	William Hutchison	50,097	61.46	+16.56
Labour	H. T. Muggeridge	31,410	38.54	−6.36
Majority		18,687	22.92	N/A
Turnout		81,507	65.31	−4.79
Registered electors		124,795		
Conservative gain from Labour		Swing		

=== Elections in the 1920s ===
General election 1929: Romford
Party	Candidate	Votes	%	±%
Labour	H. T. Muggeridge	31,045	44.9	+6.6
Unionist	Charles Rhys	22,525	32.6	−12.0
Liberal	Arthur F Wood	15,527	22.5	+5.4
Majority		8,520	12.3	N/A
Turnout		69,097	70.1	−4.4
Registered electors		98,577		
Labour gain from Unionist		Swing	+9.3	

General election 1924: Romford
Party	Candidate	Votes	%	±%
Unionist	Charles Rhys	15,520	44.6	+8.8
Labour	Albert Emil Davies	13,312	38.3	+4.4
Liberal	David Marshall Mason	5,957	17.1	−13.2
Majority		2,208	6.3	+4.4
Turnout		34,789	74.5	+13.1
Registered electors		46,708		
Unionist hold		Swing	+2.2	

General election 1923: Romford
Party	Candidate	Votes	%	±%
Unionist	Charles Rhys	9,585	35.8	N/A
Labour	Albert Emil Davies	9,109	33.9	−7.6
Liberal	David Marshall Mason	8,144	30.3	−28.2
Majority		476	1.9	N/A
Turnout		26,838	61.4	+2.2
Registered electors		43,715		
Unionist gain from Liberal		Swing	N/A	

General election 1922: Romford
Party	Candidate	Votes	%	±%
National Liberal	Albert Edward Martin	14,070	58.5	+1.0
Labour	Albert Emil Davies	9,967	41.5	+13.4
Majority		4,103	17.0	−12.4
Turnout		24,037	59.2	+10.8
Registered electors		40,597		
National Liberal hold		Swing		

=== Elections in the 1910s ===
General election 1918: Romford
Party		Candidate	Votes	%
C	National Liberal	Albert Edward Martin	10,300	57.5
	Labour	Walter H. Letts	5,044	28.1
	National Socialist Party	Arthur Whiting	2,580	14.4
Majority			5,256	29.4
Turnout			17,924	48.4
Registered electors			37,055	
	National Liberal win (new boundaries)			
C indicates candidate endorsed by the coalition government.

== Election results 1885–1918 ==
=== Elections in the 1910s ===
General election December 1910: Romford
Party	Candidate	Votes	%	±%
Liberal	John Bethell	22,119	54.0	+1.8
Conservative	Peter Griggs	18,850	46.0	−1.8
Majority		3,269	8.0	+3.6
Turnout		40,969	77.3	−6.5
Registered electors		53,002		
Liberal hold		Swing	+1.8	

General election January 1910: Romford
Party	Candidate	Votes	%	±%
Liberal	John Bethell	23,181	52.2	−10.7
Conservative	G.H. Williamson	21,224	47.8	+10.7
Majority		1,957	4.4	−21.4
Turnout		44,405	83.8	+8.7
Registered electors		53,002		
Liberal hold		Swing	−10.7	

=== Elections in the 1900s ===
General election 1906: Romford
Party	Candidate	Votes	%	±%
Liberal	John Bethell	21,534	62.9	+21.5
Conservative	Louis Sinclair	12,679	37.1	−21.5
Majority		8,855	25.8	N/A
Turnout		34,213	75.1	+14.3
Registered electors		45,579		
Liberal gain from Conservative		Swing	+21.5	

General election 1900: Romford
Party	Candidate	Votes	%	±%
Conservative	Louis Sinclair	10,450	58.6	+2.4
Liberal	L. R. Holland	7,388	41.4	0.0
Majority		3,062	17.2	+4.8
Turnout		17,838	60.8	−9.9
Registered electors		29,316		
Conservative hold		Swing	+2.4	

=== Elections in the 1890s ===
1897 Romford by-election: Romford
Party	Candidate	Votes	%	±%
Conservative	Louis Sinclair	8,156	50.4	−5.8
Liberal	Herbert Raphael	8,031	49.6	+5.8
Majority		125	0.8	−11.6
Turnout		16,187	69.0	−1.7
Registered electors		23,475		
Conservative hold		Swing	−5.8	

- Caused by Wigram's resignation

General election 1895: Romford
Party	Candidate	Votes	%	±%
Conservative	Alfred Money-Wigram	8,257	56.2	+1.4
Liberal	John Bethell	6,430	41.4	−3.8
Majority		1,827	12.4	+2.8
Turnout		14,687	70.7	−2.5
Registered electors		20,779		
Conservative hold		Swing	+1.4	

1894 Romford by-election: Romford
Party	Candidate	Votes	%	±%
Conservative	Alfred Money-Wigram	7,573	52.4	−2.4
Liberal	John Bethell	6,890	47.6	+2.4
Majority		683	4.8	−4.8
Turnout		14,463	76.0	+2.8
Registered electors		19,040		
Conservative hold		Swing	−2.4	

- Caused by Theobald's death

General election 1892: Romford
Party	Candidate	Votes	%	±%
Conservative	James Theobald	6,724	54.8	−2.0
Liberal	Herbert Raphael	5,542	45.2	+21.6
Majority		1,182	9.6	−23.6
Turnout		12,266	73.2	+14.1
Registered electors		16,750		
Conservative hold		Swing	−11.8	

=== Elections in the 1880s ===
General election 1886: Romford
Party	Candidate	Votes	%	±%
Conservative	James Theobald	4,233	56.8	+7.2
Liberal	James Hume Webster	1,755	23.6	−26.8
Liberal Unionist	John Westlake	1,457	19.6	N/A
Majority		2,478	33.2	N/A
Turnout		7,445	59.1	−9.8
Registered electors		12,591		
Conservative gain from Liberal		Swing	+17.0	

General election 1885: Romford
Party	Candidate	Votes	%
Liberal	John Westlake	4,370	50.4
Conservative	James Theobald	4,306	49.6
Majority		64	0.8
Turnout		8,676	68.9
Registered electors		12,591	
Liberal win (new seat)			

== Boundary changes ==
Previous constituency	Year	Area	Year	Subsequent constituency
South Essex	1885	East Ham	1918	East Ham North, East Ham South
South Essex	1885	Ilford	1918	Ilford
South Essex	1885	Little Ilford	1918	East Ham North
South Essex	1885	Wanstead	1918	Epping
South Essex	1885	Barking	1945	Barking
South Essex	1885	Dagenham	1945	Dagenham
South Essex	1885	Hornchurch	1945	Hornchurch
South Essex	1885	Noak Hill/Harold Hill	1974	Upminster
South Essex	1885	Romford, Havering-atte-Bower	1974	Current Romford constituency
South East Essex	1918	Rainham, Wennington	1945	Hornchurch
Chelmsford	1918	Cranham, Great Warley, Upminster	1945	Hornchurch
Chelmsford	1950	Brentwood	1955	Billericay

== See also ==
- Parliamentary constituencies in London

== Sources ==
- Leigh Rayment's Historical List of MPs – Constituencies beginning with "R" (part 2)
