= William Hutchison (MP for Romford) =

Manx Member of Parliament and actor

William Gordon Douglas Hutchison (26 September 1904 – 18 July 1975) was a Manx Member of Parliament and actor.

Born on the Isle of Man, Hutchison was educated at St William's College on the island. He became an actor, and also a supporter of the Conservative Party. He stood in Romford at the 1931 United Kingdom general election, winning the seat, but was defeated at the 1935 general election.

During World War II, Hutchison served in the Royal Navy, becoming a lieutenant.
