= Hackney Central (UK Parliament constituency) =

Parliamentary constituency in the United Kingdom, 1955–1983

- Former borough constituency for the House of Commons

1885–1950
- Seats: one
- Created from: Hackney
- Replaced by: Hackney South and Stoke Newington and Hackney North

1955–1983
- Seats: one
- Created from: Hackney South
- Replaced by: Hackney North and Stoke Newington and Hackney South and Shoreditch

Hackney Central was a borough constituency in what was then the Metropolitan Borough of Hackney, in London. It returned one Member of Parliament (MP) to the House of Commons of the Parliament of the United Kingdom.

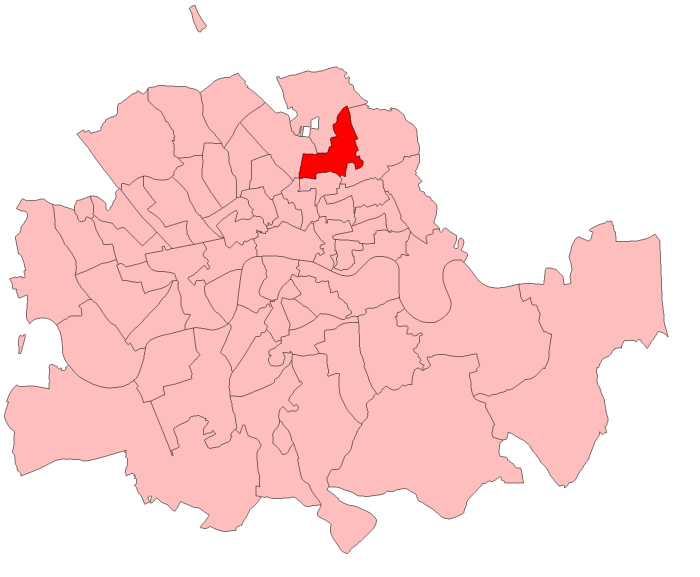
Hackney Central in the Metropolitan area, boundaries 1885–1918

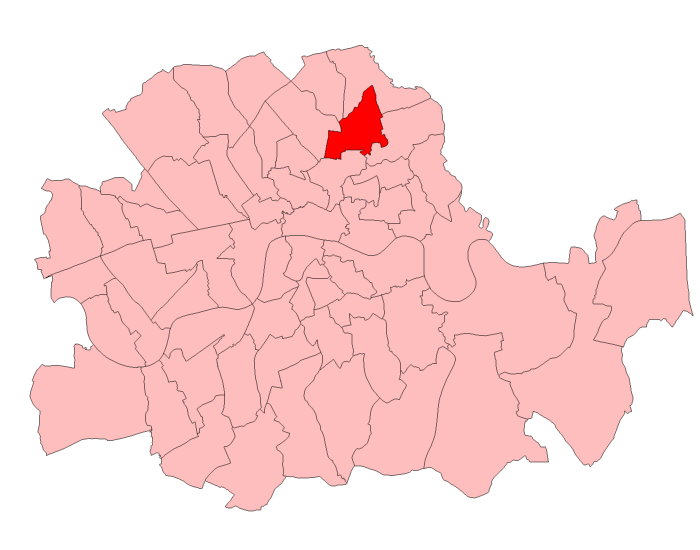
Hackney Central in the County of London, boundaries 1918–1950

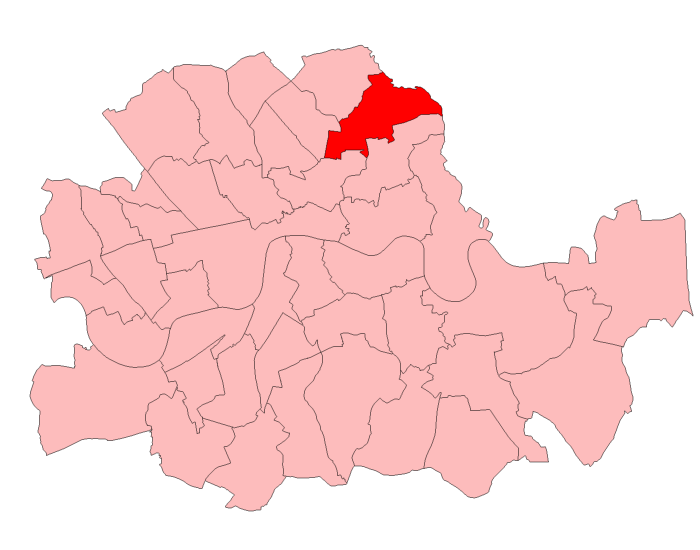
Hackney Central in the County of London, boundaries 1955–1974

A map showing the wards of Hackney Metropolitan Borough as they appeared in 1916.

The constituency was created under the Redistribution of Seats Act, 1885 from 1885, and abolished for the 1950 general election. It was recreated for the 1955 general election, and abolished again for the 1983 general election.

== Boundaries ==
1885–1918: The wards of Dalston and De Beauvoir Town, and part of Hackney ward.

1918–1950: The Metropolitan Borough of Hackney wards of Downs, Hackney, and Kingsland, and part of West Hackney ward.

1955–1974: The Metropolitan Borough of Hackney wards of Albion, Chatham, Kenninghall, Kingsland, Kingsmead, Leabridge, Pembury, Rushmore, and Town Hall.

1974–1983: The London Borough of Hackney wards of Chatham, Downs, Kingsmead, Leabridge, Rectory, and Wick.

== Members of Parliament ==
=== MPs 1885–1950 ===
Election	Name	Party
1885	Sir William Guyer Hunter	Conservative
1892	Andrew Scoble	Conservative
1900	Augustus Allhusen	Conservative
1906	Sir Albert Spicer	Liberal
1918	William Woolcock	Coalition Liberal
1922	Arthur Lever	National Liberal
1923	Leonard Franklin	Liberal
1924	Robert Gower	Conservative
1929	Fred Watkins	Labour
1931	John Lockwood	Conservative
1935	Fred Watkins	Labour
1945	Harry Hynd	Labour
1950	constituency abolished	

=== MPs 1955–1983 ===
Election	Name	Party
1955	constituency recreated	
1955	Herbert Butler	Labour
1970	Stanley Clinton-Davis	Labour
1983	constituency abolished	

== Election results ==
=== Elections in the 1880s ===
General election 1885: Hackney Central
Party	Candidate	Votes	%
Conservative	William Hunter	2,941	51.7
Liberal	John Holms	2,748	48.3
Majority		193	3.4
Turnout		5,689	77.1
Registered electors		7,381	
Conservative win (new seat)			

General election 1886: Hackney Central
Party	Candidate	Votes	%	±%
Conservative	William Hunter	3,047	60.8	+9.1
Liberal	Martin Hume	1,961	39.2	−9.1
Majority		1,086	21.6	+18.2
Turnout		5,008	67.8	−9.3
Registered electors		7,381		
Conservative hold		Swing	+9.1	

=== Elections in the 1890s ===
Andrew Scoble

General election 1892: Hackney Central
Party	Candidate	Votes	%	±%
Conservative	Andrew Scoble	3,478	52.1	−8.7
Liberal	John Fyfe Stewart	3,193	47.9	+8.7
Majority		285	4.2	−17.4
Turnout		6,671	74.5	+6.7
Registered electors		8,951		
Conservative hold		Swing	-8.7	

General election 1895: Hackney Central
Party	Candidate	Votes	%	±%
Conservative	Andrew Scoble	3,278	52.5	+0.4
Liberal	Charles Russell	2,966	47.5	−0.4
Majority		312	5.0	+0.8
Turnout		6,244	70.7	−3.8
Registered electors		8,835		
Conservative hold		Swing	+0.4	

=== Elections in the 1900s ===
General election 1900: Hackney Central
Party	Candidate	Votes	%	±%
Conservative	Augustus Allhusen	3,747	62.6	+10.1
Liberal	Israel Hart	2,243	37.4	−10.1
Majority		1,504	25.2	+20.2
Turnout		5,990	68.9	−1.8
Registered electors		8,692		
Conservative hold		Swing	+10.1	

Albert Spicer

General election 1906: Hackney Central
Party	Candidate	Votes	%	±%
Liberal	Albert Spicer	3,998	54.2	+16.8
Conservative	Augustus Allhusen	3,382	45.8	−16.8
Majority		616	8.4	N/A
Turnout		7,380	84.1	+15.2
Registered electors		8,779		
Liberal gain from Conservative		Swing	+16.8	

=== Elections in the 1910s ===
General election January 1910: Hackney Central
Party	Candidate	Votes	%	±%
Liberal	Albert Spicer	4,429	53.5	−0.7
Liberal Unionist	Felix Cassel	3,853	46.5	+0.7
Majority		576	7.0	−1.4
Turnout		8,282	88.6	+4.5
Liberal hold		Swing	-0.7	

General election December 1910: Hackney Central
Party	Candidate	Votes	%	±%
Liberal	Albert Spicer	3,954	53.3	−0.2
Conservative	Albert Henry Jessel	3,464	46.7	+0.2
Majority		490	6.6	−0.4
Turnout		7,418	79.4	−9.2
Liberal hold		Swing	-0.2	

W. Woolcock

General election 1918: Hackney Central
Party		Candidate	Votes	%	±%
C	Liberal	William Woolcock	Unopposed		
	Liberal hold				
C indicates candidate endorsed by the coalition government.

=== Elections in the 1920s ===
A. Lever

General election 1922: Hackney Central
Party	Candidate	Votes	%	±%
National Liberal	Arthur Lever	9,795	46.4	New
Liberal	Thomas Wood	6,825	32.3	N/A
Labour	Arthur Lynch	4,507	21.3	New
Majority		2,970	14.1	N/A
Turnout		21,127	60.3	N/A
National Liberal gain from Liberal		Swing	N/A	

General election 1923: Hackney Central
Party	Candidate	Votes	%	±%
Liberal	Leonard Franklin	8,569	38.6	+6.3
Unionist	Daniel Thomas Keymer	7,252	32.7	New
Labour	Ernest E. Hunter	6,354	28.7	+7.4
Majority		1,317	5.9	−8.2
Turnout		22,175	62.8	+2.5
Liberal hold		Swing	+10.0	

General election 1924: Hackney Central
Party	Candidate	Votes	%	±%
Unionist	Robert Gower	11,414	42.7	+10.0
Labour	Ernest E. Hunter	9,684	36.3	+7.6
Liberal	Leonard Franklin	5,594	21.0	−17.6
Majority		1,730	6.4	N/A
Turnout		26,692	74.2	+11.4
Unionist gain from Liberal		Swing	+13.8	

General election 1929: Hackney Central
Party	Candidate	Votes	%	±%
Labour	Fred Watkins	12,462	37.3	+1.0
Unionist	Alfred Bossom	10,814	32.3	−10.4
Liberal	Leonard Franklin	10,186	30.4	+9.4
Majority		1,648	5.0	N/A
Turnout		33,462	70.0	−4.2
Labour gain from Unionist		Swing	+5.7	

=== Elections in the 1930s ===
General election 1931: Hackney Central
Party	Candidate	Votes	%	±%
Conservative	John Lockwood	16,963	52.1	+19.8
Labour	Fred Watkins	9,295	28.5	−8.8
Liberal	Leonard Franklin	6,316	19.4	−11.0
Majority		7,668	23.6	N/A
Turnout		32,574	67.8	−2.2
Conservative gain from Labour		Swing	+14.3	

General election 1935: Hackney Central
Party	Candidate	Votes	%	±%
Labour	Fred Watkins	15,332	51.6	+23.1
Conservative	John Lockwood	14,375	48.4	−3.7
Majority		957	3.2	N/A
Turnout		29,707	60.6	−7.2
Labour gain from Conservative		Swing	+13.4	

General Election 1939–40

Another General Election was required to take place before the end of 1940. The political parties had been making preparations for an election to take place from 1939 and by the end of this year, the following candidates had been selected;

- Labour: Fred Watkins
- Conservative: William Arthur Fearnley-Whittingstall

=== Elections in the 1940s ===
General election 1945: Hackney Central
Party	Candidate	Votes	%	±%
Labour	Harry Hynd	14,810	67.2	+15.6
Conservative	R.R. Harris	4,889	22.2	−26.2
Liberal	Samuel Woolf Magnus	2,348	10.6	New
Majority		9,921	45.0	+41.8
Turnout		22,047	65.7	+5.1
Labour hold		Swing	+18.9	

=== Elections in the 1950s ===
General election 1955: Hackney Central
Party	Candidate	Votes	%	±%
Labour	Herbert Butler	27,012	61.74	
Conservative	James Allason	15,212	34.77	
Communist	John R Betteridge	1,530	3.50	New
Majority		11,800	26.97	
Turnout		43,754	66.11	
Labour hold		Swing		

General election 1959: Hackney Central
Party	Candidate	Votes	%	±%
Labour	Herbert Butler	25,407	61.50	
Conservative	John C T Waring	15,905	38.50	
Majority		9,502	23.00	
Turnout		41,312	66.03	
Labour hold		Swing		

=== Elections in the 1960s ===
General election 1964: Hackney Central
Party	Candidate	Votes	%	±%
Labour	Herbert Butler	23,110	66.32	
Conservative	H Martin L Morton	11,376	33.68	
Majority		11,376	32.66	
Turnout		34,844	57.09	
Labour hold		Swing		

General election 1966: Hackney Central
Party	Candidate	Votes	%	±%
Labour	Herbert Butler	21,466	63.76	
Conservative	H Martin L Morton	7,440	22.10	
Liberal	Cecil V Gittins	4,762	14.14	New
Majority		14,026	41.66	
Turnout		33,668	57.54	
Labour hold		Swing	+4.5	

=== Elections in the 1970s ===
General election 1970: Hackney Central
Party	Candidate	Votes	%	±%
Labour	Stanley Clinton-Davis	17,380	64.4	+0.6
Conservative	Kenneth Lightwood	9,339	34.6	+12.5
Independent	Aftab Qureshi	252	0.9	New
Majority		8,041	29.8	−12.1
Turnout		26,971	50.8	−6.7
Registered electors		53,120		
Labour hold		Swing		

General election February 1974: Hackney Central
Party	Candidate	Votes	%	±%
Labour	Stanley Clinton-Davis	18,705	61.81	
Conservative	Kenneth Lightwood	6,302	20.82	
Liberal	MG Snow	5,256	17.37	New
Majority		12,403	40.99	
Turnout		30,263	62.70	
Registered electors		48,270		
Labour hold		Swing		

General election October 1974: Hackney Central
Party	Candidate	Votes	%	±%
Labour	Stanley Clinton-Davis	17,650	68.89	
Conservative	Kenneth Lightwood	4,797	18.72	
Liberal	MG Snow	3,174	12.39	
Majority		12,853	50.17	
Turnout		25,621	52.80	
Registered electors		48,524		
Labour hold		Swing		

General election 1979: Hackney Central
Party	Candidate	Votes	%	±%
Labour	Stanley Clinton-Davis	16,506	59.0	
Conservative	Nicholas Bennett	7,718	27.6	
Liberal	Elikkos Georghiades	1,835	6.6	
National Front	Ronald May	1,418	5.1	New
Communist	D Boyes	340	1.2	New
Workers Revolutionary	Mark Johnson	136	0.5	New
Majority		8,788	31.4	
Turnout		27,953	60.2	
Registered electors		46,464		
Labour hold		Swing		
