= Havering Park (ward) =

Former electoral ward of the London Borough of Havering, England

- Former electoral ward for the Havering London Borough Council
- Havering Park ward boundaries from 2002 to 2022
- Borough: Havering
- County: Greater London

Former electoral ward
- Created: 2002
- Abolished: 2022
- Councillors: 3
- Replaced by: Gooshays and Havering-atte-Bower

Havering Park was an electoral ward in the London Borough of Havering from 2002 to 2022. It was first used in the 2002 elections and last used in the 2018 elections. The ward returned three councillors to Havering London Borough Council.

== List of councillors ==
Term	Councillor	Party
2002–2010	Andy Mann (Note: Andy Mann changed parties in 2006)	Conservative
2002–2010	Andy Mann	Residents
2002–2006	Michael Armstrong	Conservative
2002–2014	Geoffrey Starns	Conservative
2006–2014	Sandra Binion	Conservative
2010–2014	Billy Taylor	Conservative
2014–2018	Margaret Davis	Conservative
2014–2022	Raymond Best	Conservative
2014–2022	John Crowder	Conservative
2018–2022	Christine Vickery	Conservative

== Summary ==
Councillors elected by party at each general borough election.

- Conservative
- Residents

== Havering council elections ==
=== 2018 election ===
The election took place on 3 May 2018.

2018 Havering London Borough Council election: Havering Park
Party	Candidate	Votes	%	±%
Conservative	Raymond Best	2,088	64.1	
Conservative	John Crowder	2,001	61.4	
Conservative	Christine Vickery	1,865	57.2	
Labour	David Dawson	802	24.6	
Labour	Carol Singh	687	21.1	
Labour	Birendra Singh	678	20.8	
UKIP	David Rumble	370	11.4	
Green	Andrew Longhurst	356	10.9	
Liberal Democrats	Peter Hobday	190	5.8	
Turnout			32.1%	
Majority		1,063		
Conservative hold		Swing		
Conservative hold		Swing		
Conservative hold		Swing		

=== 2014 election ===
The election took place on 22 May 2014.

2014 Havering London Borough Council election: Havering Park
Party	Candidate	Votes	%	±%
Conservative	Margaret Davis	1,787		
Conservative	Raymond Best	1,699		
Conservative	John Crowder	1,635		
UKIP	Sandra Binion	1,527		
UKIP	Andrew Wilson	1,493		
UKIP	Edward Martin	1,421		
Labour	Emma Adams	656		
Labour	David Dawson	533		
Labour	Peter Mcinerney	533		
Green	Joanna Steranka	149		
Liberal Democrats	Peter Spence	90		
Turnout				
Conservative hold		Swing		
Conservative hold		Swing		
Conservative hold		Swing		

=== 2010 election ===
The election on 6 May 2010 took place on the same day as the United Kingdom general election.

2010 Havering London Borough Council election: Havering Park
Party	Candidate	Votes	%	±%
Conservative	Billy Taylor	2,910		
Conservative	Sandra Binion	2,889		
Conservative	Geoffrey Starns	2,849		
Residents	Andy Mann	1,814		
Residents	Denis Stevens	1,451		
Residents	Kevin Tonks	1,373		
Labour	Peter Mcinerney	853		
Labour	John Mccole	806		
Labour	Irene Stacey	769		
UKIP	Edward Martin	729		
Turnout				
Conservative hold				
Conservative hold				
Conservative gain from Residents		Swing		

=== 2006 election ===
The election took place on 4 May 2006.

2006 Havering London Borough Council election: Havering Park
Party	Candidate	Votes	%	±%
Conservative	Sandra Binion	1,617	44.3	
Conservative	Geoffrey Starns	1,606		
Residents	Andy Mann	1,400	38.3	
Conservative	Alby Tebbutt	1,365		
Residents	Kevin Tonks	1,230		
Residents	Jean Gower	1,224		
Labour	Peter McInerney	415	11.4	
Labour	Peter White	404		
Labour	Pervez Badruddin	383		
UKIP	Charles Hawksbee	221	6.0	
UKIP	Harry Parkinson	179		
UKIP	Jennie Parkinson	168		
Turnout			39.0	
Conservative hold		Swing		
Conservative hold		Swing		
Residents gain from Conservative		Swing		

=== 2002 election ===
The election took place on 2 May 2002. As an experiment, it was a postal voting election, with the option to hand the papers in on election day.

2002 Havering London Borough Council election: Havering Park
Party	Candidate	Votes	%	±%
Conservative	Andy Mann	2,776		
Conservative	Michael Armstrong	2,703		
Conservative	Geoffrey Starns	2,703		
Labour	Christopher Collard	997		
Labour	Frederick Symes	980		
Labour	Paul Stygal	959		
Turnout				
Conservative win (new seat)				
Conservative win (new seat)				
Conservative win (new seat)				
