= Louis Sinclair =

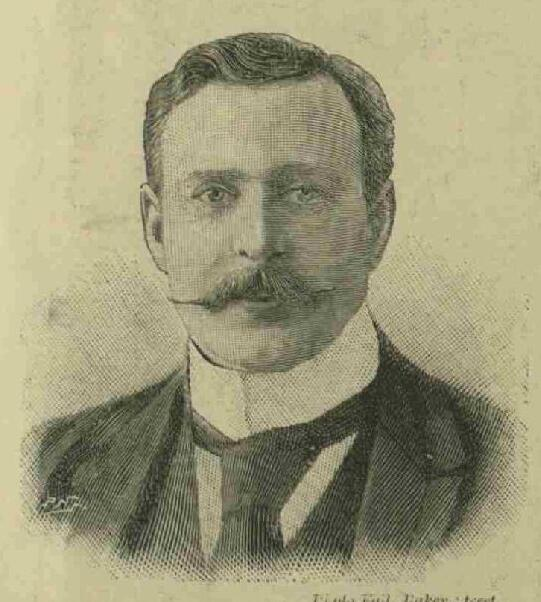
- Born: 1861
- Died: 4 January 1928 (aged 66–67)
- Occupation: Politician
- Position held: member of the 27th Parliament of the United Kingdom (1900–1906), member of the 26th Parliament of the United Kingdom (1897–1900)

Louis Schlesinger Sinclair (1861 – 4 January 1928) was Conservative MP for Romford.

Born in Paris of English parents, Sinclair was educated at University College, London and on the Continent, He went to Australia in 1878 and was on the staff of The Argus, then engaged in various commercial pursuits before retiring at the age of 25.

He won the seat at the 1897 Romford by-election, held it in 1900, but lost it in the 1906 Liberal landslide. Much concerned with commercial questions, he was involved with the formation of various parliamentary committees related to the subject. He also promoted Anglo-French relations and organized parliamentary visits between the two countries.
