= John Lockwood (British politician) =

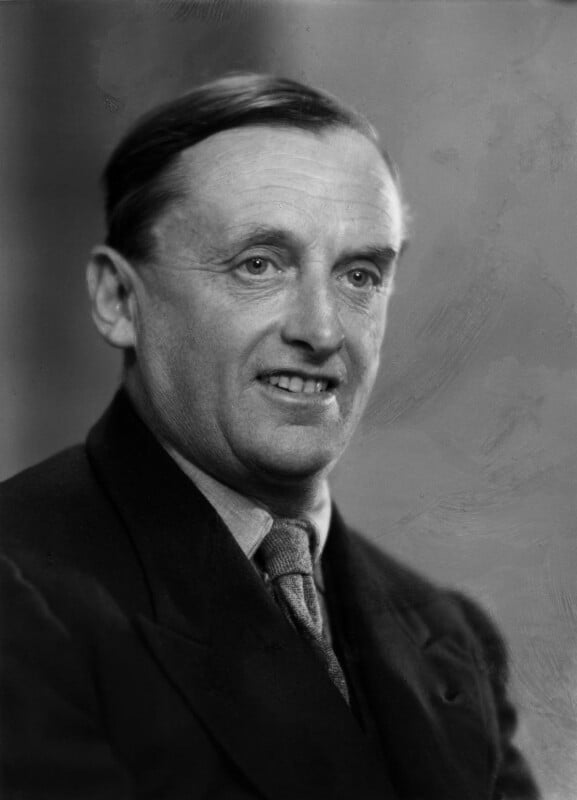
Lockwood in 1946

Lieutenant-Colonel John Cutts Lockwood CBE TD (December 1890 – 18 January 1983) was a Conservative Party politician in England.

At the 1931 general election, he was elected as member of parliament (MP) for Hackney Central. He was defeated at the 1935 general election, and unsuccessfully contested the Bexley constituency at the 1945 general election.

He was returned to the House of Commons at the 1950 general election as MP for Romford, and held the seat until retiring at the 1955 general election.

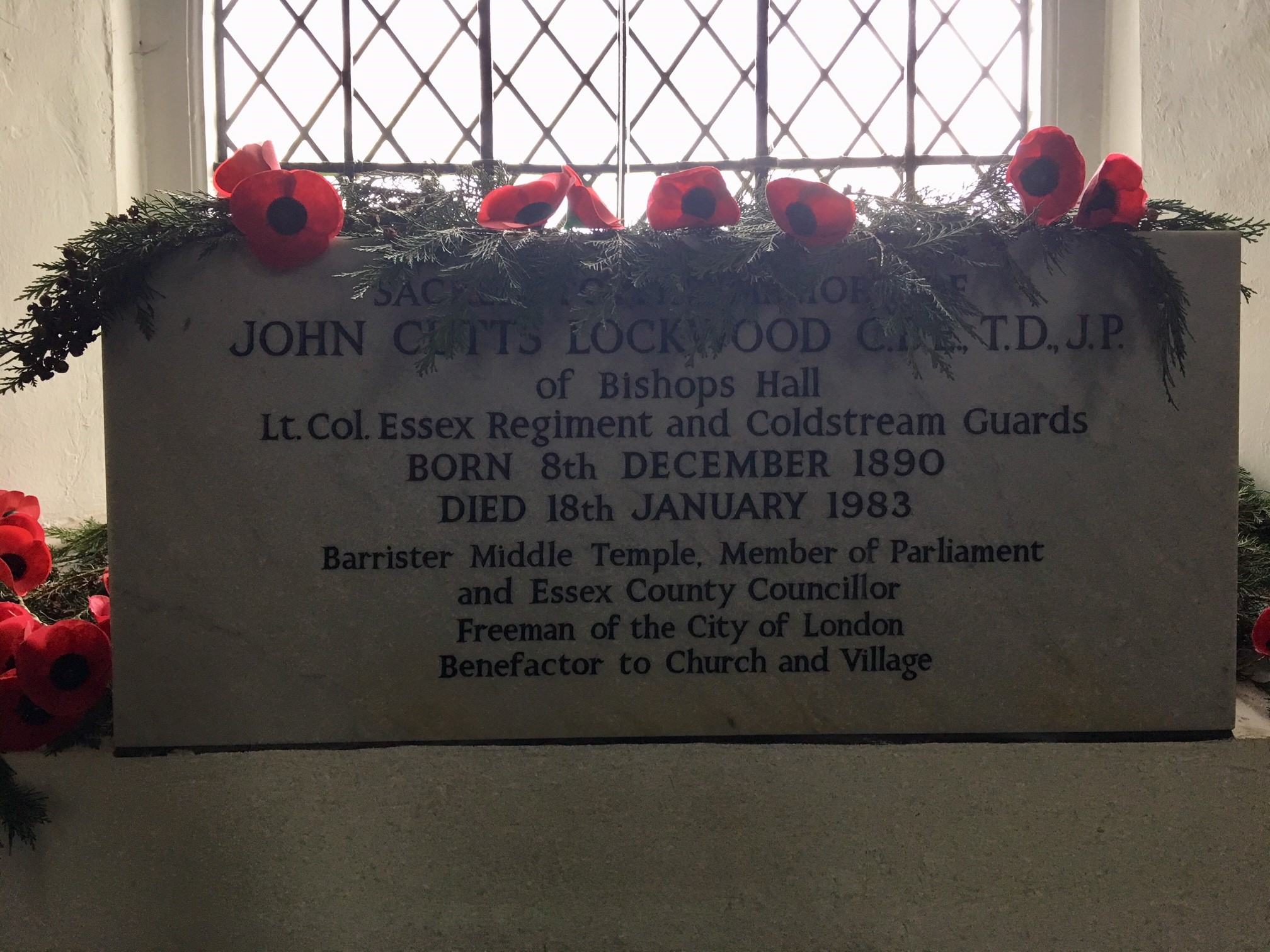
Memorial to John Lockwood in the church of St Mary and All Saints, Lambourne, Essex

== Sources ==
- Craig, F. W. S. (1983) [1969]. British parliamentary election results 1918-1949 (3rd ed.). Chichester: Parliamentary Research Services. ISBN 0-900178-06-X.
- Richard Kimber's Political Science Resources: UK General Elections since 1832
- Leigh Rayment's Historical List of MPs

Parliament of the United Kingdom
Preceded by Frederick Charles Watkins	Member of Parliament for Hackney Central; 1931 – 1935	Succeeded by Frederick Charles Watkins
Preceded by Thomas Macpherson	Member of Parliament for Romford; 1950 – 1955	Succeeded by Ron Ledger
