= Erotica UK =

Erotic consumer exhibition in London, England

Erotica was an adult, consumer exhibition held each November at Olympia, London, UK. A mainstream "lifestyle show" aimed primarily at women and couples, it encouraged visitors to celebrate or re-kindle their relationships with goods and services aimed to enhance their love lives. Erotica's organisers claimed that it was the world's largest lifestyle show "for freethinking adults who are comfortable with their sexuality". Erotica cancelled its 2014 show and has not taken place since.

Exhibitors, including many small- to medium-sized companies and sole traders, offered fashion, corsetry, lingerie, shoes, jewellery, art, photography, sculpture, adult toys, games, books, DVDs, furniture and romantic gifts. Popular free entertainment included stage shows that ran several times each day (produced by London's Torture Garden), Dreamboys, entertainers that wandered among the crowds, workshops and demonstrations (including glamour photography, bodycasting, and burlesque classes), and a team of National Health Service sexual health advisors offering free advice, condoms, and chlamydia testing. Erotica was keen to promote safe, respectful and responsible sex, and welcomed visitors of all sexual orientations – straight, gay, and transgender.

== History ==
Erotica's first show was at Olympia London, in 1997 and was an annual event there every November thereafter. Erotica Manchester had its first show at the G-Mex Centre in March 2003 but ticket sales were poor in 2005 despite attempts the previous year to attract visitors by having former Conservative Member of Parliament Neil Hamilton promote the event and the organisers did not return.

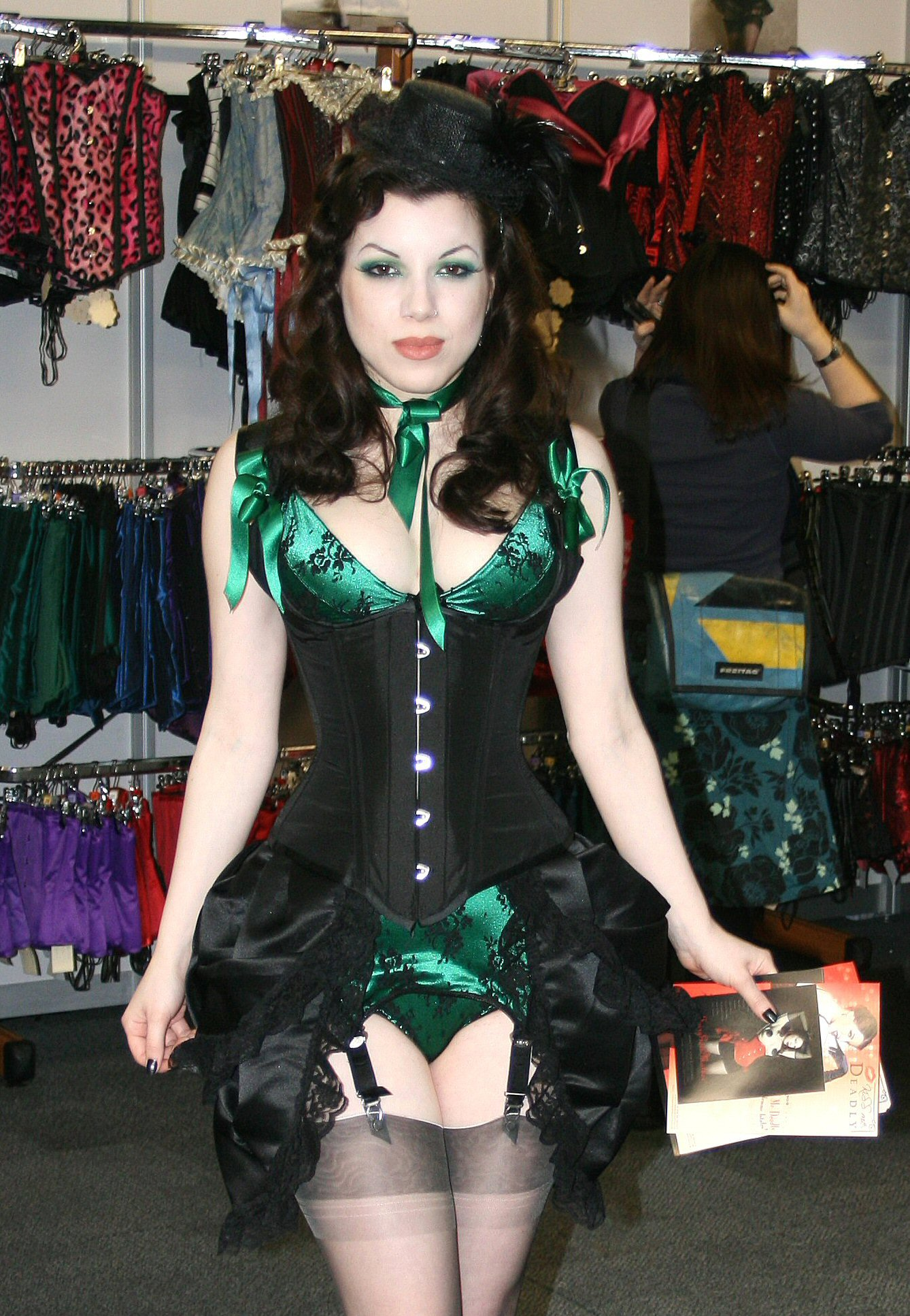
Erotica London exhibitor, 2008

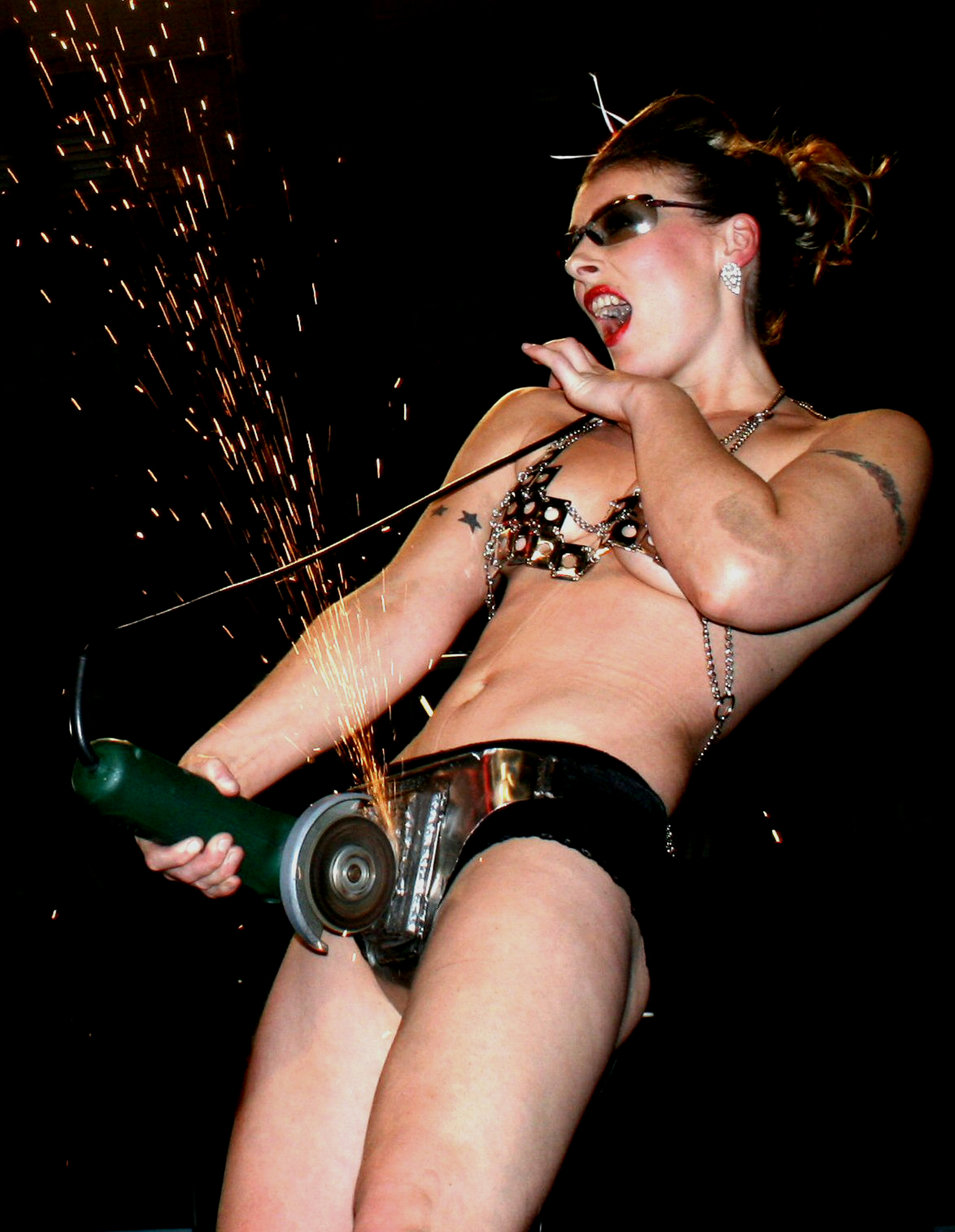
Stage show at Erotica Olympia, London

== Previous shows ==
Erotica in London
Year	Dates	Visitors
1997	28–30 November	12,000
1998	??–?? May	14,000
1998	27–29 November	17,000
1999	26–28 November	19,379
2000	24–26 November	41,237
2001	30 Nov – 2 Dec	54,984
2002	22–24 November	59,797
2003	14–16 November	65,542
2004	19–21 November	70,000
2005	18–20 November	80,000
2006	17–19 November	82,000
2007	23–25 November	70,000
2008	21–23 November	56,000
2009	20–22 November	56,000
2010	19–21 November	TBC

Erotica in Manchester
Year	Dates
2003	21–23 March
2004	26–28 March
2005	1–3 April

Erotica 2013 was held on 25–27 October 2013 at Tobacco Dock in London.
