= Thomas Macpherson, 1st Baron Macpherson of Drumochter =

British businessman and politician (1888–1965)

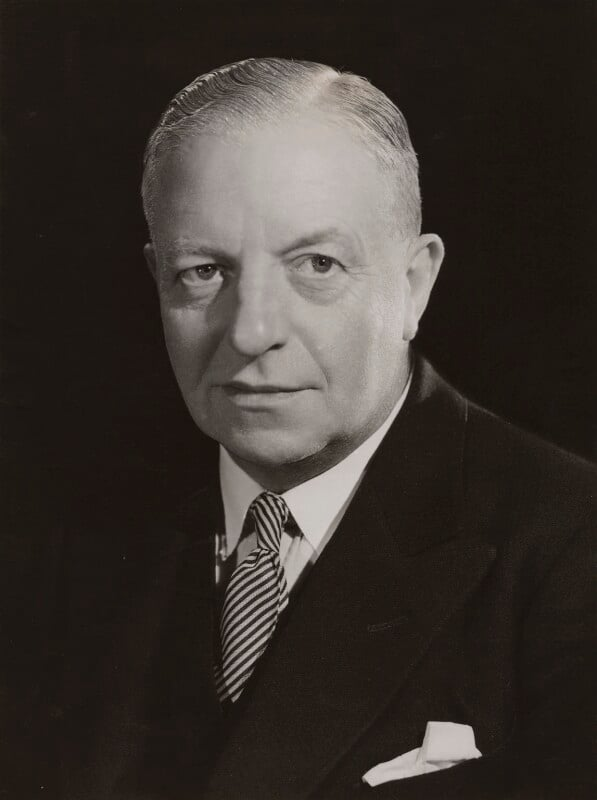
Macpherson in 1947

Thomas Macpherson, 1st Baron Macpherson of Drumochter (9 July 1888 – 11 June 1965), was a British businessman and Labour Party politician.

Macpherson was the son of James Macpherson of Muirhead, near Chryston in Lanarkshire. He was Chairman of Macpherson, Train & Co Ltd, food and produce importers and exporters. He was also involved in the Food Defence Plans organisation from 1938 to 1939 and served as Chairman of the London Provision Exchange and as a Member of the Port of London Authority. He was Chairman of Romford Division Liberal Association before joining the Labour Party in 1934.

In 1945 Macpherson was elected to the House of Commons as Member of Parliament (MP) for Romford, a seat he held until 1950. The following year, on 30 January 1951, he was raised to the peerage as Baron Macpherson of Drumochter, of Great Warley in the County of Essex.

Lord Macpherson of Drumochter married Lucy, daughter of Arthur Butcher, in 1920. He died in June 1965, aged 76, and was succeeded in the barony by his only son Gordon. Lady Macpherson of Drumochter died in 1984.

== Arms ==
Coat of arms of Thomas Macpherson, 1st Baron Macpherson of Drumochter
Crest "A wildcat sejant guardant proper holding a cross-crosslet fitchée gules." Escutcheon "Arms Per fesse or and azure, a lymphad sail furled flags and pennon flying counter-changed between in chief a dexter hand fessewise couped at the wrist grasping a dagger point upwards, and a cross-crosslet fitchée gules, and in base an oak tree eradicated proper fructed or." Supporters "Dexter: a lion gules, gorged with a collar, pendent therefrom an escutcheon or, charged with a garb azure; Sinister: a bull gules, armed and unguled azure, gorged with a collar pendent therefrom an escutcheon gold charged with a boar's head couped also azure." Motto Above the Crest: Touch Not This Cat But A Glove; Below the Arms: If There's No Ripple At The Bow There's Something Wrong

Parliament of the United Kingdom
Preceded by John Parker	Member of Parliament for Romford; 1945–1950	Succeeded by John Lockwood
Peerage of the United Kingdom
New creation	Baron Macpherson of Drumochter; 1951–1965	Succeeded by James Gordon Macpherson
