= Tiorati Brook Road =

Parkway in New York, US

Tiorati Brook Parkway
- Tiorati Brook Road highlighted in red

Route information
- Maintained by Palisades Interstate Park Commission
- Length: 3.6 mi (5.8 km)
- Restrictions: No commercial vehicles

Major junctions
- West end: Seven Lakes Drive / Arden Valley Road in Harriman State Park
- East end: Palisades Parkway / Lake Welch Parkway in Harriman State Park

Location
- Country: United States
- State: New York
- Counties: Orange, Rockland

Highway system
- New York Highways; Interstate; US; State; Reference; Parkways

Tiorati Brook Road is an east-west parkway located within Harriman State Park in southern New York in the United States. The highway extends for 3.6 miles (5.8 km) between Tiorati Circle, a traffic circle connecting Tiorati Brook Road to Seven Lakes Drive in Orange County, and an interchange with the Lake Welch Parkway just west of where that parkway ends at the Palisades Interstate Parkway in Rockland County. The road crosses over the county line roughly midway between the two locations. Tiorati Brook Road is owned and maintained by the Palisades Interstate Park Commission.

The road, once known as Cedar Ponds Road, was first spotted on a map of Rockland County by David Barr in 1839. The route was taken over by the county of Rockland in 1899 until 1915, when the Palisades Park Interstate Commission took over the highway. The group paved the rugged route through Harriman State Park with gravel in 1915, widening it a year later. In 1931, the route was paved from Tiorati Circle to NY 210 (now County Route 106). Since 1931, the route has been truncated twice: once for the construction of the Palisades Interstate Parkway and later for the construction of Lake Welch Parkway.

== Route description ==
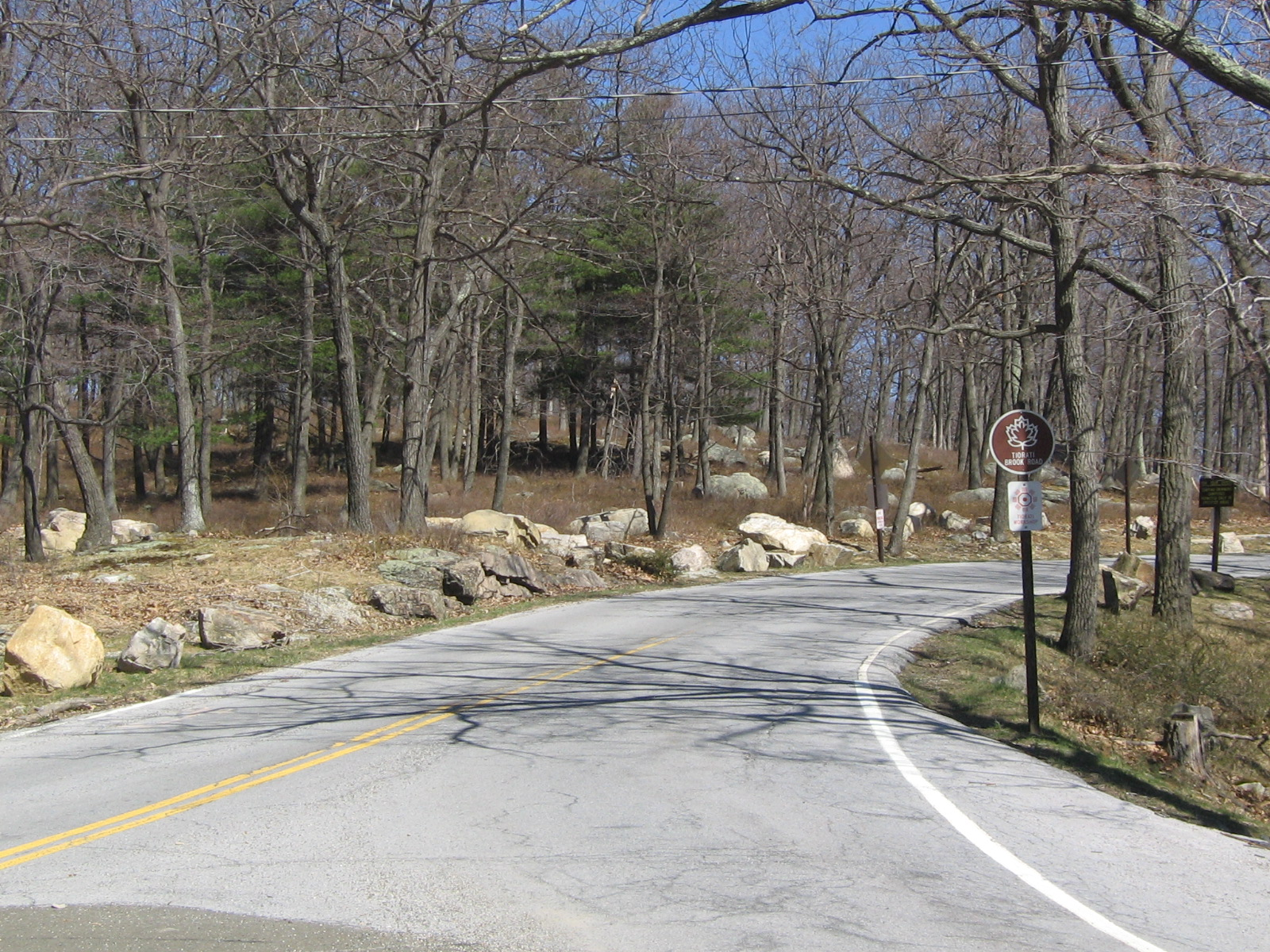
Tiorati Brook Road begins at the Tiorati Circle on Seven Lakes Drive.

Tiorati Brook Road begins at Tiorati Circle, a traffic circle at the north end of Lake Tiorati in Harriman State Park. Here, the road connects to Seven Lakes Drive and the eastern terminus of Arden Valley Road. The highway heads southeast from the junction, running along the northeastern edge of Lake Tiorati as it passes by the dense forests that comprise most of Harriman State Park. After 1 mile (1.6 km), the highway serves the Tiorati Workshop, a collaboration between the State Park and Bank Street College of Education, located adjacent to the eastern lake shore. Past the workshop, the road takes on a more southerly routing and descends down a hill before crossing Tiorati Brook by way of a dam. Just south of the dam is Day Camp in the Park, where Tiorati Brook Road turns back to the east to follow its namesake waterway away from the lake.

For the next 2 miles (3.2 km), the highway meanders southeastward across the park's sprawling forests, intersecting no other roads of note. During this stretch, the road passes from Orange County to Rockland County. It eventually ends at a wye interchange with Lake Welch Parkway, where the road merges into the northbound direction of the parkway. The southbound connection is made by way of a northbound to southbound U-turn a short distance to the east. The interchange lies just west of Lake Welch Parkway's northern terminus at Palisades Interstate Parkway exit 16, a partial interchange lacking a connection between Lake Welch Parkway northbound and Palisades Parkway northbound.

== History ==
The roadway that would later become Tiorati Brook Road dates back to records from a map of Rockland County in 1839 by David Barr. Known as the Cedar Ponds Road, the road was acquired by the county in 1899, and in 1907, when a report to the county was made, the route was in really poor condition for their roads. Topographical maps dating as far back as 1910 show Tiorati Brook Road as a local road reaching as far east as what is today the intersection of Gate Hill Road (Rockland CR 106) and Cedar Falls Road (CR 69), east of the Palisades Interstate Parkway.

In May 1915, the Palisades Interstate Park Commission took over maintenance of the road, which ran from the dam at Cedar Ponds to the village of Stony Point. In 1916, the Commission widened the road to 26 feet (7.9 m) of gravel. Fifteen years later, the Commission paved the roadway with asphalt from Tiorati Circle to the junction with NY 210 (designated the prior year, now CR-106). In 1953, construction of the Palisades Interstate Parkway caused the road to be truncated in a local section called Pingyp. The final truncation to Tiorati Brook Road occurred in 1971 with construction of the Lake Welch Parkway (originally Lake Welch Drive), which ate a 0.5 miles (0.80 km) long section.

== Major intersections ==
County	Location	mi	km	Destinations	Notes
Orange	Harriman State Park	0.00	0.00	Seven Lakes Drive / Arden Valley Road west to US 6 / Palisades Parkway – Bear Mountain, Lake Kanawauke, Lake Sebago, Lake Welch, Sloatsburg	Tiorati Circle; western terminus; eastern terminus of Arden Valley Road
Rockland	Harriman State Park	3.60	5.79	Palisades Parkway south / Lake Welch Parkway south to Seven Lakes Drive – Lake Tiorati	Eastern terminus; northern terminus of Lake Welch Parkway; exit 16 on Palisades Parkway
1.000 mi = 1.609 km; 1.000 km = 0.621 mi
