= County Route 106 (Orange County, New York) =

Road in New York, United States

County Route 106
- Lake Kanawauke Road
- Map of Orange County in southeastern New York with CR 106 highlighted in red

Route information
- Maintained by Orange County Highway Department
- Length: 5.23 mi (8.42 km)
- Existed: April 1, 1980–January 1, 2014

Major junctions
- West end: NY 17 / NY 17A in Southfields
- Seven Lakes Drive in Harriman State Park
- East end: CR 106 at the Rockland County line in Haverstraw

Location
- Country: United States
- State: New York
- County: Orange

Highway system
- County routes in New York; County Routes in Orange County
← CR 105	→ CR 107

County Route 106 (CR 106) in the county of Orange County, New York, was a continuation of two routes, New York State Route 17A (NY 17A) at its western terminus and Rockland CR 106 at the eastern terminus. Route 106 began at an intersection with NY 17A and its parent route, NY 17 in Southfields, where CR 106 signs are still posted according to the August 2018 Google Street View images. The route went eastward through Harriman State Park, crossing Seven Lakes Drive before entering nearby Rockland County, New York. There it became Rockland County Route 106 and heads all the way to Stony Point.

CR 106 was originally a part of NY 210. When Route 210 was assigned in the 1930 New York State Route renumbering, it stretched from the New Jersey border in Greenwood Lake, over the current alignments of NY 17A, Orange CR 106 and Rockland CR 106, all the way to Stony Point. During a maintenance swap in 1980, NY 210 was truncated all the way back to NY 17A north of Greenwood Lake, and the route was replaced by both County Route 106s. CR 106 in Orange County was decommissioned on January 1, 2014, when maintenance of the road was transferred to the Palisades Interstate Park Commission.

Much of CR 106 was mountainous, with peaks reaching as high as 1,200 feet (370 m). The road is also very scenic, passing many hiking trails in Harriman State Park as well as several lakes. CR 106 was only one of two routes in Orange County to retain their Rockland County designation when crossing the border. The other was County Route 72 northeast of Sloatsburg.

== Route description ==
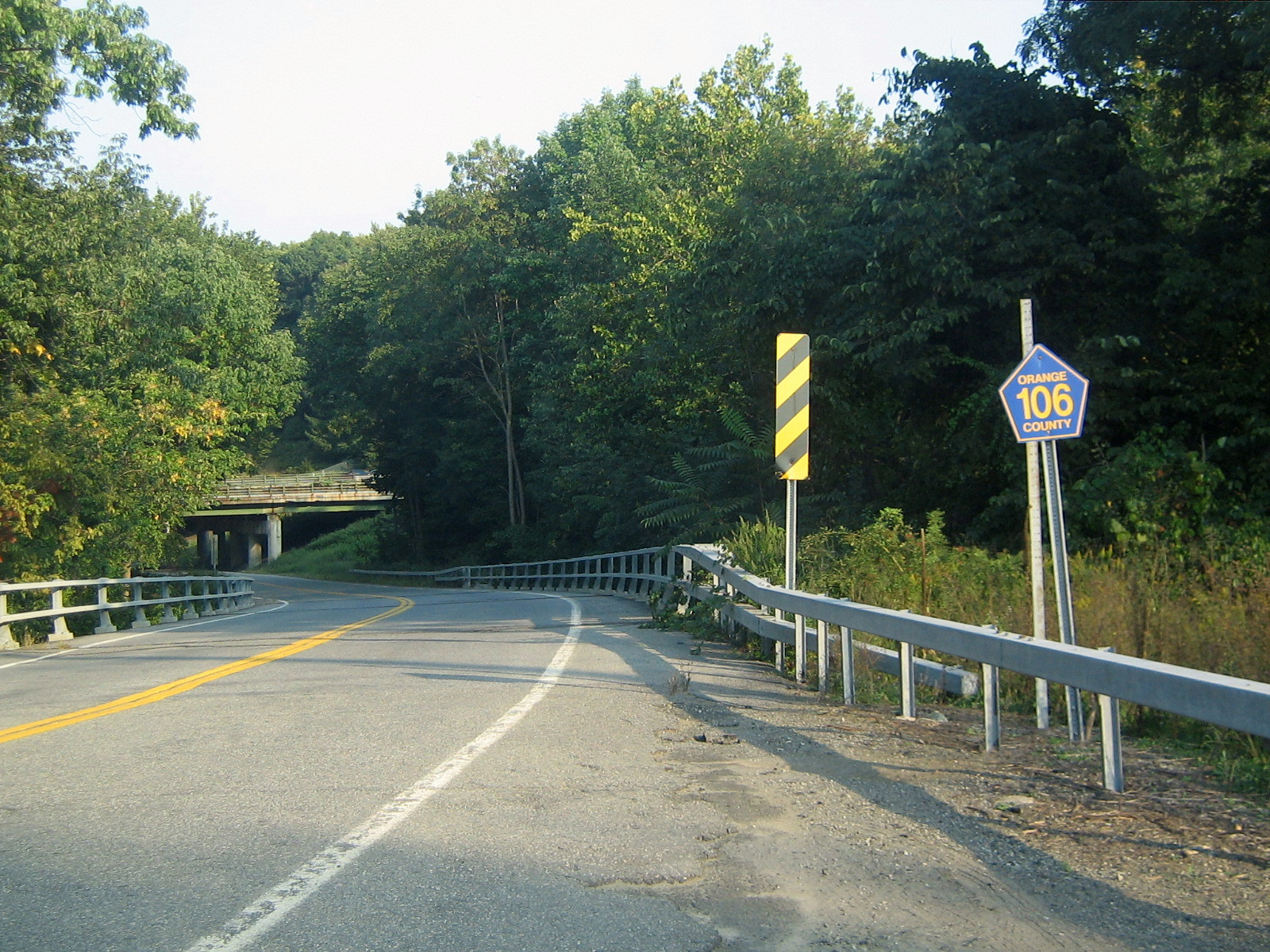
CR 106 underpass near the western terminus

Route 106 begins at an interchange with NY 17 (the Orange Turnpike) and NY 17A (the Warwick Turnpike) in the hamlet of Southfields. Route 106 heads eastward, crossing over the Ramapo River and passing below the New York State Thruway before entering the mountainous regions of Harriman State Park. The highway heads into Harriman as Lake Kanawauke Road, passing to the south of Green Pond Mountain, a peak in Harriman that also contains part of the Appalachian Trail.

Much of the route heads in different directions, with constant curves. Route 106 heads south of Lake Stahahe, a large lake in Harriman, curving around the base of a mountain. After leaving the lake and mountain behind, Route 106 makes several drastic turns, one to the north and one to the south. After another curve, this time to the east, Route 106 passes to the north of Tom Jones Mountain, the highest peak along the highway. Soon after, the road parallels the shore of Little Long Pond.

Route 106 crosses Lake Kanawauke after leaving the shore of Little Long Pond. Soon afterwards, the highway intersects with Seven Lakes Drive at a roundabout. Just after the roundabout, Route 106 crosses the county border into Rockland County.

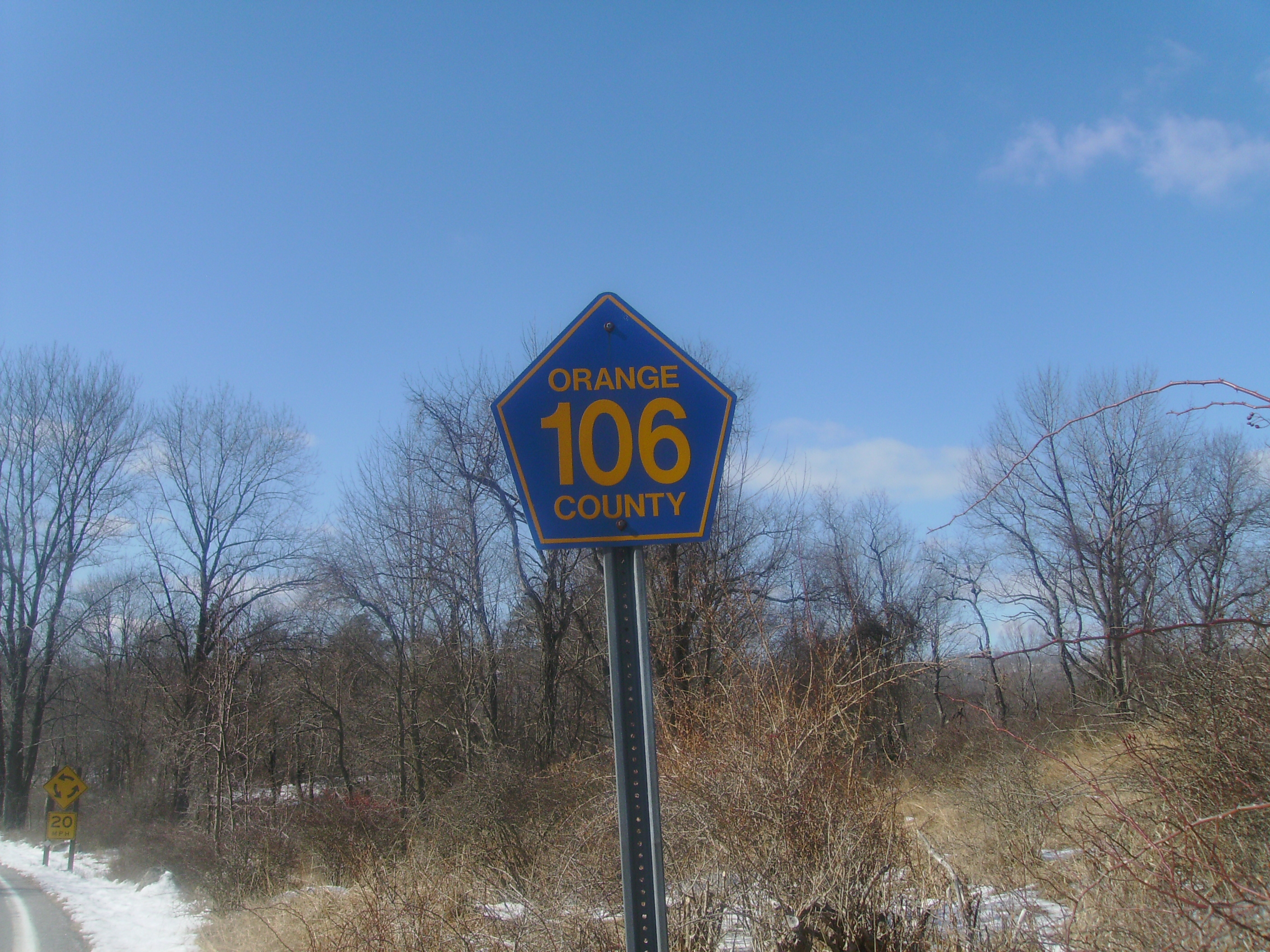
Orange 106 shield near county line

== History ==
=== Historic turnpikes ===
The highway that would later become part of CR 106 originated in 1824. That is when the road was chartered as the New Turnpike, which stretched from what is now Southfields (formerly known as Monroe) to a fork in the road, which part later became NY 210. When the park opened in 1910, CR 106 was known as Southfields Road. In 1913, it became part of Seven Lakes Drive, with another designation coming three years later as County Highway 416. During the period of 1919 and 1920, the road was reconstructed, with a bridge being built three years later. A new route was assigned that year making up the old Warwick Turnpike as NY 17A.

=== NY 210 ===
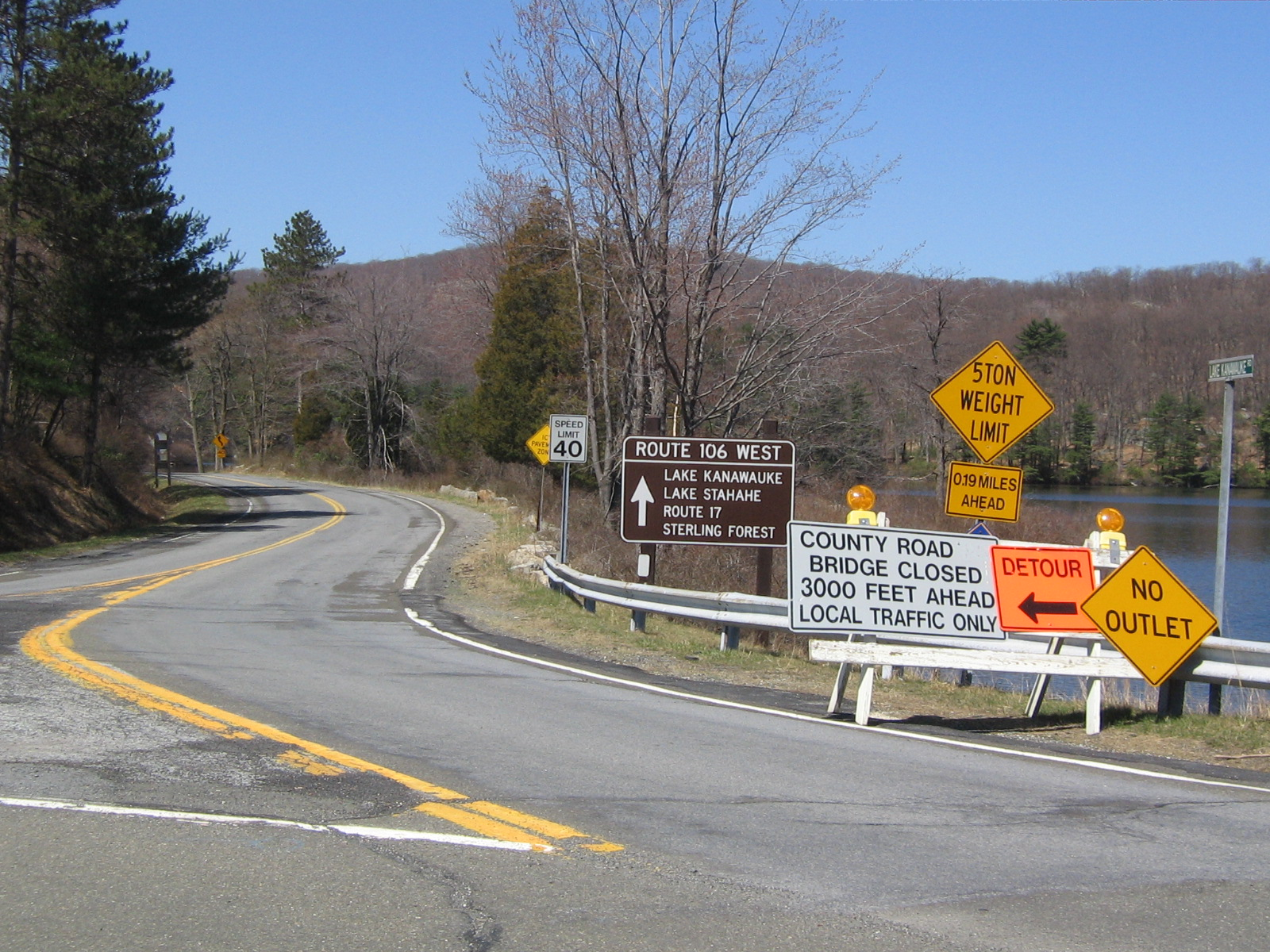
Signs depicting the closed Route 106 for the culvert failure in April 2008 (at Seven Lakes Drive)

Route 210 was assigned over the current CR 106 alignment in the 1930 New York State Route renumbering. The route then stretched from County Route 511 south of Greenwood Lake, all the way up to NY 17A, where the two routes became concurrent. At the interchange for NY 17, Route 17A ended, with 210 continuing eastward into Harriman. Route 210 headed eastward, into Rockland County, ending in Stony Point. During the maintenance swaps between the state of New York and various counties in 1980, Route 210 was truncated to the part between CR 511 to the Route 17 interchange. The route was replaced by County Route 106 in both Rockland and Orange counties.

=== Palisades Interstate Park Commission ownership ===
Effective January 1, 2014, County Road 106 was transferred from ownership and maintenance responsibilities by Orange County to the Palisades Interstate Park Commission as a park road between Route 17 and the Rockland/Orange County border. Orange County had closed the road in the Spring of 2008 as a result of two culverts associated with Lake Kanawauke being determined by the County as unsafe to carry vehicular traffic. After discussions with the Commission, the County agreed to repair the culverts as well as make other required improvements to the road on the condition that the Commission takes possession of the road upon completion of said improvements. The agreement also made clear that the Commission would only accept the road as a park road and retain the authority to close it seasonally consistent with other park roads. As of August 2018, CR 106 signs remain posted at the NY 17 / NY 17A junction according to the Google Street View Images.

=== 2008 culvert failure ===
Route 106 near Little Long Pond was closed in March 2008 due to the failure of a culvert between Little Long Pond and Lake Kanawauke. Route 106 was closed off in the area, with the rest of the road open for hikers. However, the road was not going to be connected again until summer of 2008. People are also allowed to walk in the area. Although the projected date of the summer of 2008 passed, the Palisades Interstate Park Commission and Orange County Department of Highways did not open the highway. On April 3, 2009, over one year since the closing of the highway, the Commission, Department of Highways (in conjunction with the New York State Department of Transportation) reported that the construction to fix the safety concerns near Little Long Pond would cost $300,000 (2009 USD). The construction report said the probable finish date for the project is December 1, 2009. The construction was, in fact, completed in December 2009 which also included the reconstruction of a second culvert connecting the northern and southern portions of Lake Kanawauke, located approximately 1/2 mile east of the failed culvert.

== Major intersections ==
Location	mi	km	Destinations	Notes
Southfields	0.00	0.00	NY 17A west – Greenwood Lake	Continuation west
Southfields	0.00	0.00	NY 17 – Tuxedo, Harriman	Interchange
Harriman State Park	5.20	8.37	Seven Lakes Drive to NY 17 / Lake Welch Parkway north – Lake Sebago, Lake Tiorati, Bear Mountain	Kanawauke Circle; Lake Welch Parkway signed as Lake Welch Drive
Harriman State Park	5.23	8.42	CR 106 east (Kanawauke Road)	Continuation into Rockland County
1.000 mi = 1.609 km; 1.000 km = 0.621 mi

== See also ==
- County Route 106 (Rockland County, New York)
- List of county routes in Orange County, New York
