= County Route 106 =

County Route 106 may refer to:

- County Route 106 (Albany County, New York)
- County Route 106 (Bergen County, New Jersey)
- County Route 106 (Cortland County, New York)
- County Route 106 (Erie County, New York)
- County Route 106 (Nassau County, New York)
- County Route 106 (Orange County, New York)
- County Route 106 (Orleans County, New York)
- County Route 106 (Rockland County, New York)
- County Route 106 (Schenectady County, New York)
- County Route 106 (Suffolk County, New York)
- County Route 106 (Westchester County, New York)
