= Arden Valley Road =

Highway in New York

Arden Valley Parkway
- Arden Valley Road highlighted in red

Route information
- Maintained by Palisades Interstate Park Commission
- Length: 5.2 mi (8.4 km)
- Existed: 1922–present
- Restrictions: No commercial vehicles

Major junctions
- West end: NY 17 in Southfields
- East end: Seven Lakes Drive / Tiorati Brook Road in Harriman State Park

Location
- Country: United States
- State: New York
- Counties: Orange

Highway system
- New York Highways; Interstate; US; State; Reference; Parkways

Arden Valley Road is an east-west parkway located in Southfields, New York, in the United States, that travels through Harriman State Park and is owned by the Palisades Interstate Park Commission. At 5.2 miles (8.4 km) long, it begins at New York State Route 17 (NY 17) in Southfields and ends at Seven Lakes Drive in Harriman State Park. Arden Valley Road also serves a trout stocking area for the Ramapo River. The road is located entirely in Orange County and is home to the Elk's Pen Trailhead in Harriman State Park. In 1921, plans arose by the commission to construct the road, which was completed the same year and stretched along the borderline with the Harriman estate. Major William A. Welch ordered 75 elk from Yellowstone National Park to be placed in a wired cage between Arden and Southfields in 1919. The elk eventually disappeared from the pen by 1942, and the area became the current Elk's Pen trailhead for trails within Harriman State Park.

== Route description ==
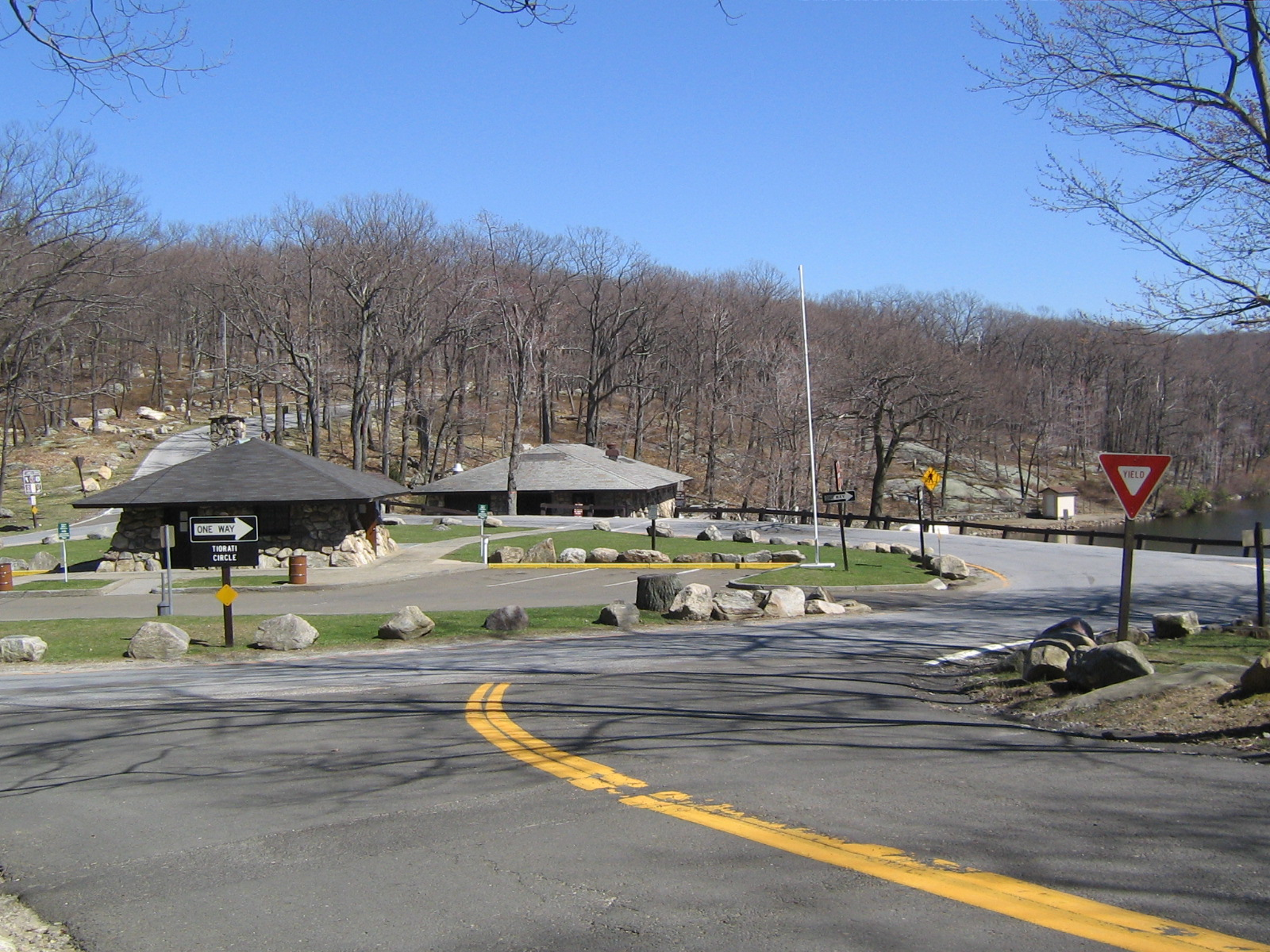
Arden Valley Road's eastern terminus at Tiorati Circle and Lake Tiorati.

Arden Valley Road begins at an intersection with NY 17 in the hamlet of Southfields (within the town of Tuxedo). The road immediately becomes a part of the right-of-way for the Appalachian Trail, a roughly 2,100-mile (3,400 km) trail spanning the eastern United States. The road heads into Harriman State Park and crosses a pair of train tracks before passing over the New York State Thruway. The highway continues along the border of Harriman State Park; at the Elk's Pen Trailhead, the Appalachian Trail leaves Arden Valley Road and heads into the park.

The road intersects with Island Pond Road, a dirt path in Harriman, as it heads along the border. Arden Valley Road intersects with Crooked Road thereafter. Harris Mine is visible to the left as the road proceeds around the base of Echo Mountain. To the southeast of Lindley Mountain, Arden Valley Road turns east and into the park. Arden Valley Road passes Lake Cohasset and Upper Lake Cohasset as it heads eastward. The road intersects with the Long Path and Ramapo–Dunderberg–Appalachian Trails soon afterward. Bradley Mine is visible to the left, and Arden Valley Road comes to an end at Tiorati Circle, where the road continues eastward as Tiorati Brook Road.

== History ==
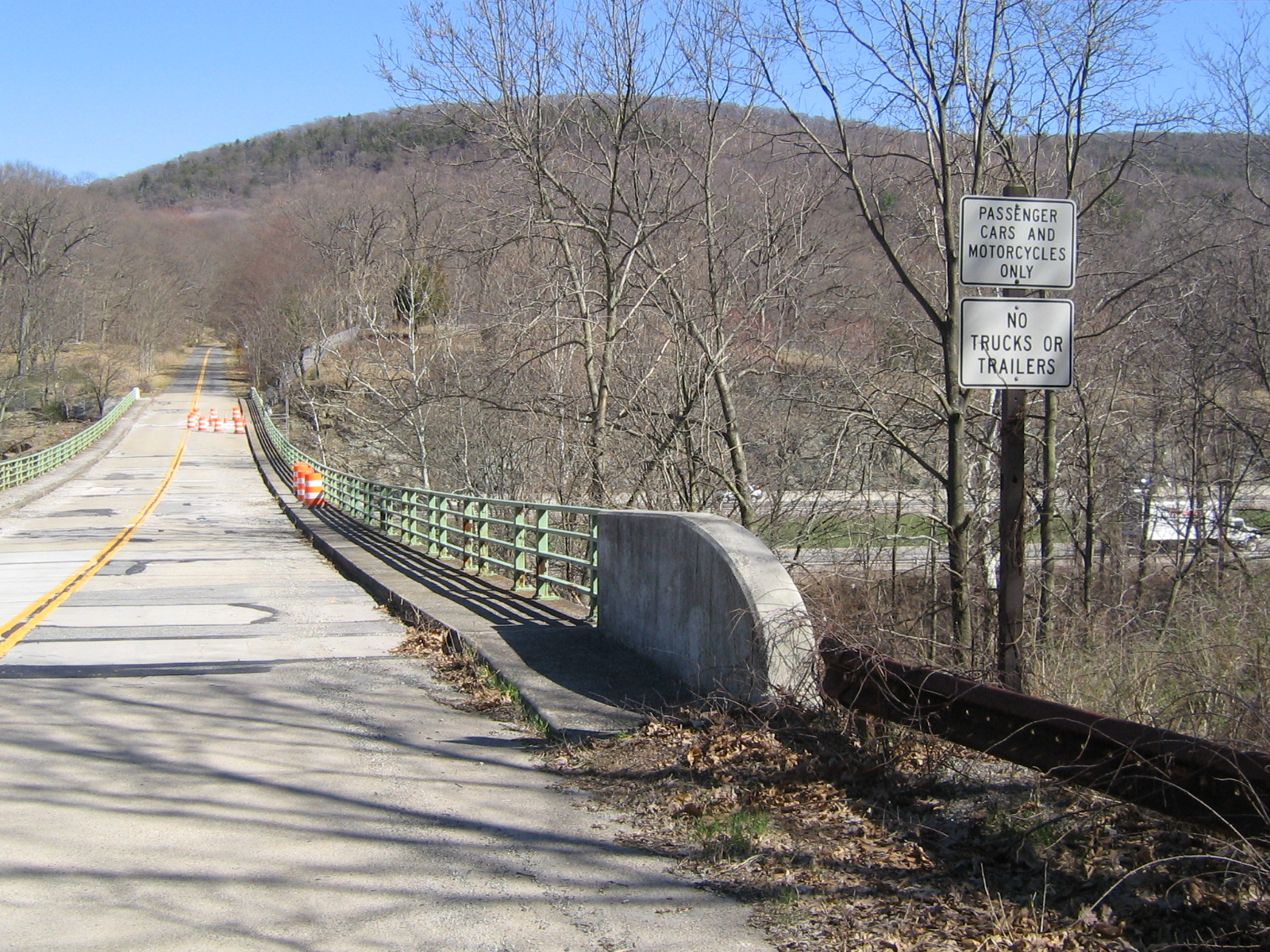
Arden Valley Road crosses the New York State Thruway just east of its western terminus at NY 17.

Construction of the Arden Brook Valley Road, which intended to connect Lake Cohasset and the brand new Upper Cohasset Lake started around 1922, with money given by the New York State Legislature in 1921 Construction of the new road was completed in 1922, extending along the borderline with the Harriman estate. Originally, people to cross the Erie Railroad tracks and the Ramapo River to continue along Arden Valley Road. This was remedied by building an underpass under the Erie Railroad and a ford over the Ramapo River. When the New York State Thruway was constructed through the Hudson Valley in 1953, engineers included the ford in construction, and as of 1999, the structure still stands.

In 1919, Major William A. Welch ordered 75 elk from Yellowstone National Park; however, some had died en route. The remaining elk were kept in a wired cage between Arden and Southfields. By 1935, some of the animals were still alive. However, by 1942, all of the elk had died. The remaining area is now known as the Elk's Pen Trailhead, which serves the Appalachian and Arden–Surebridge Trails. The remains of the pen still currently stand.

== Major intersections ==
The entire route is in Orange County.

Location	mi	km	Destinations	Notes
Arden	0.00	0.00	NY 17	Western terminus
Harriman State Park	5.20	8.37	Seven Lakes Drive / Tiorati Brook Road east to US 6 / Palisades Parkway – Bear Mountain, Lake Kanawauke, Lake Sebago, Lake Welch, Sloatsburg	Tiorati Circle; eastern terminus; western terminus of Tiorari Brook Road
1.000 mi = 1.609 km; 1.000 km = 0.621 mi

== See also ==
- Palisades Interstate Park Commission
