= Seven Lakes Drive =

Highway in New York

Seven Lakes Parkway
- Seven Lakes Drive highlighted in red (Section managed as NY 981G backed in blue, locally maintained section backed in black, and NY 987E otherwise)

Route information
- Maintained by NYSDOT and the village of Sloatsburg
- Length: 17.92 mi (28.84 km)
- Restrictions: No commercial vehicles in state parks

Major junctions
- South end: NY 17 in Sloatsburg
- US 6 / Palisades Parkway in Harriman State Park
- North end: US 9W / US 202 in Bear Mountain State Park

Location
- Country: United States
- State: New York
- Counties: Rockland, Orange

Highway system
- New York Highways; Interstate; US; State; Reference; Parkways

Seven Lakes Drive is a north–south parkway located in the Hudson Valley region of New York in the United States. It extends for just under 18 miles (29 km) on a northeast–southwest alignment from an intersection with New York State Route 17 (NY 17) in the village of Sloatsburg to a junction with U.S. Route 9W (US 9W) and US 202 south of the Bear Mountain Bridge in the town of Stony Point. Most of the parkway is located in either Harriman or Bear Mountain state parks, except for a small stretch near its southern end. Ownership of Seven Lakes Drive is split between three entities, two of which are also responsible for maintenance of the road.

Sections of Seven Lakes Drive and several other roads in the park system (Tiorati Brook Road, Lake Welch Drive, and Perkins Memorial Drive), are closed for the winter from December through March.

== Route description ==
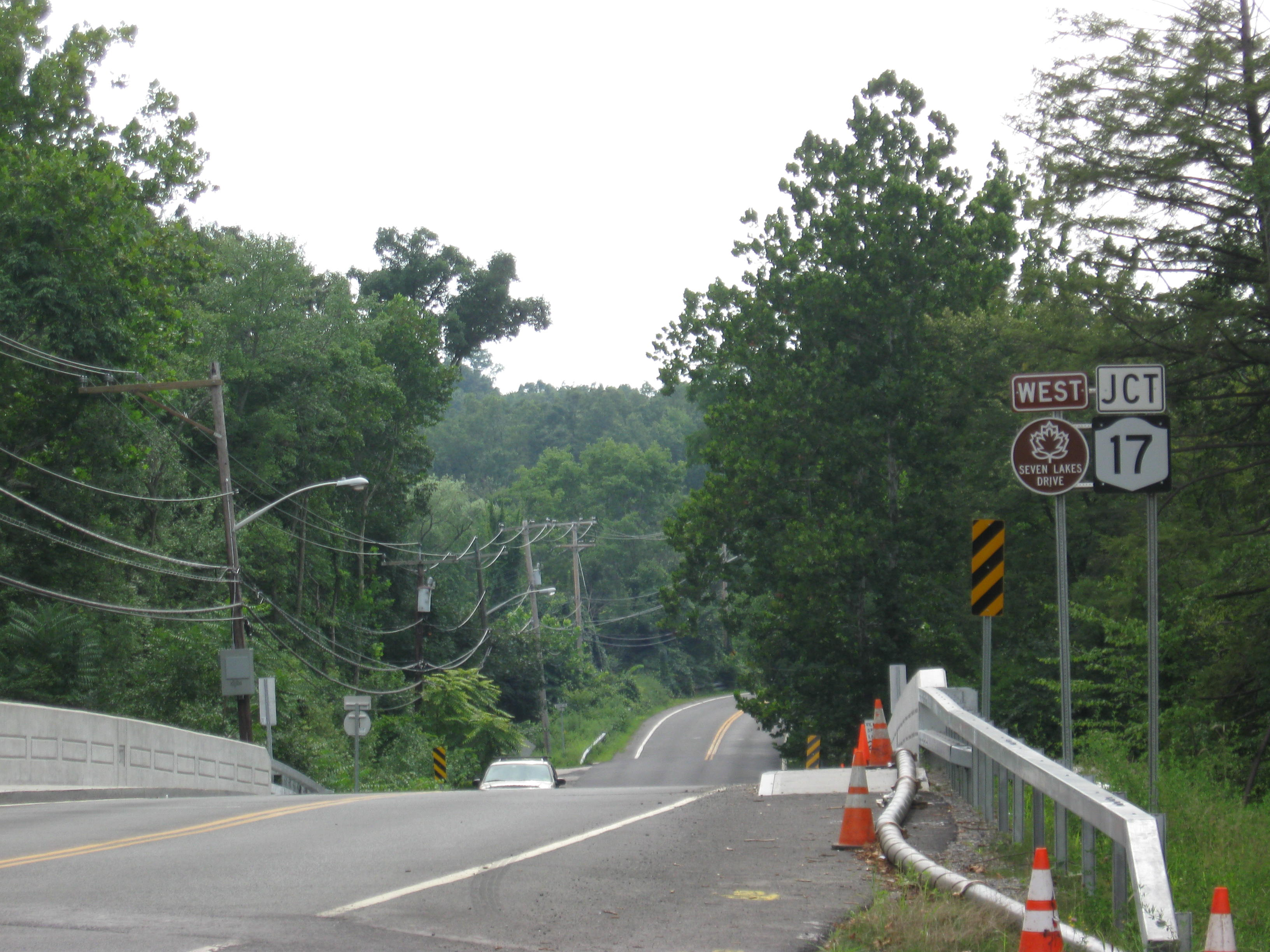
The southern terminus of Seven Lakes Drive in Sloatsburg.

As its name implies, Seven Lakes Drive passes by seven lakes located at various points along the road. From south to north, the lakes are Lake Sebago and Lake Kanawauke in the towns of Haverstraw and Tuxedo; Lake Skannatati and Lake Askoti in Tuxedo; Lake Tiorati in Tuxedo and Woodbury; Silver Mine Lake in Woodbury; and Queensboro Lake in Highlands.

The parkway is not owned by a single entity; instead, the New York State Department of Transportation (NYSDOT), the Palisades Interstate Park Commission (PIPC), and the village of Sloatsburg all own different parts of the road. In Sloatsburg, the southernmost 0.33-mile (0.53 km) from NY 17 to Waldron Terrace is state-owned and maintained as New York State Route 981G (NY 981G). Seven Lakes Drive is locally owned and maintained for another 0.44 miles (0.71 km) east to Johnsontown Road. The remaining 17.15 miles (27.60 km) is owned by PIPC and maintained by NYSDOT as New York State Route 987E (NY 987E). The NY 981G and NY 987E designations are reference routes and are unsigned.

=== Southern Rockland County ===
Seven Lakes Drive begins at an intersection with NY 17 in the village of Sloatsburg. It heads northeast through the community as a two-lane residential street, crossing over the Ramapo River and intersecting a handful of residential village streets before passing under the New York State Thruway (Interstate 87). The parkway continues to run past homes on the opposite side of the Thruway overpass, where it intersects Johnsontown Road, a road that parallels Seven Lakes Drive for 1.5 miles (2.4 km) before terminating at a dead end adjacent to the parkway. Seven Lakes Drive meets a short, unnamed connector to Johnsontown Road just 0.25 miles (0.40 km) later, at which point the road begins to pass through undeveloped wooded areas on its way across Stony Brook and into Harriman State Park.

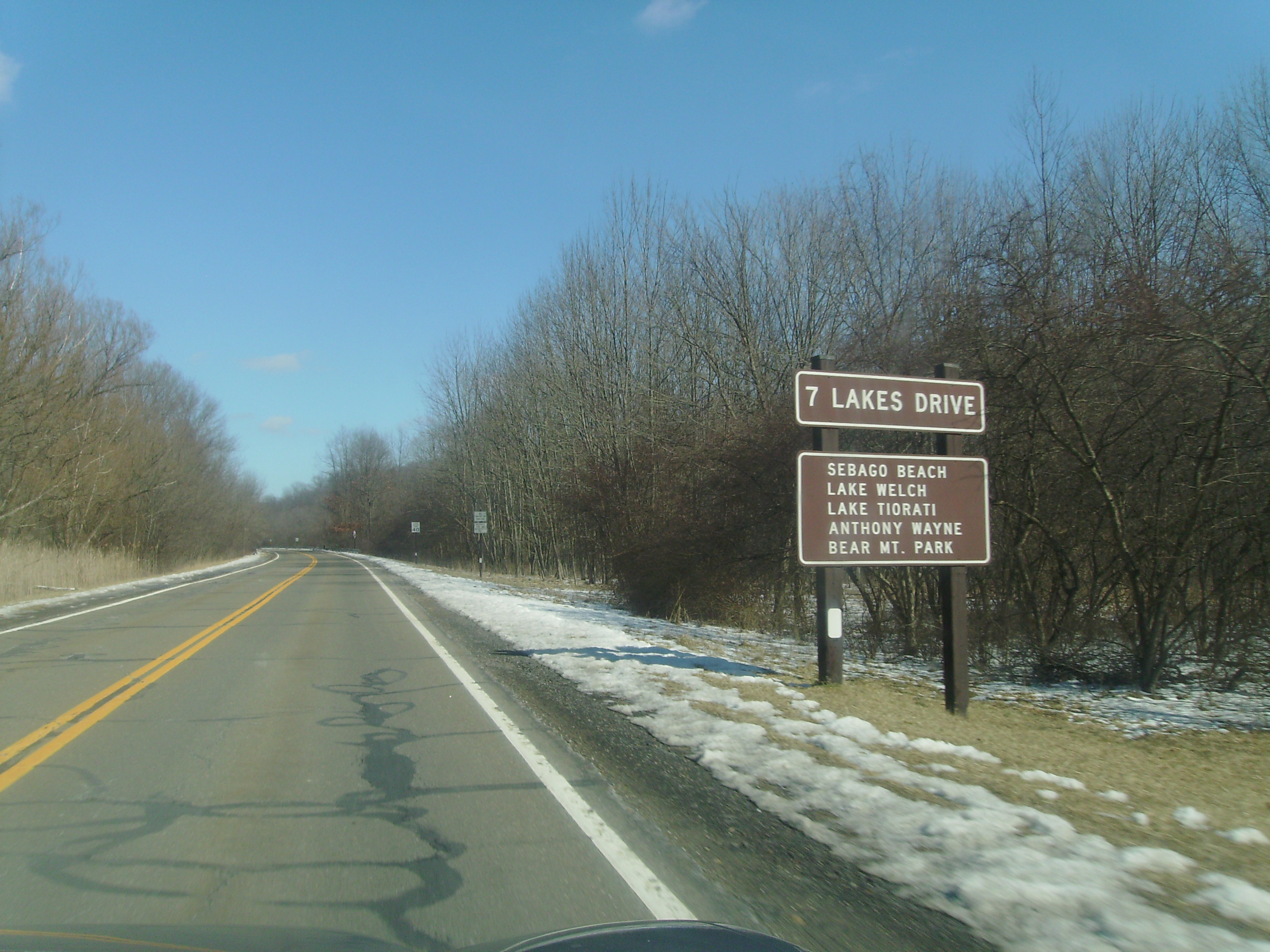
Seven Lakes Drive sign at the western entrance to Harriman State Park

Just east of the Stony Brook bridge, the Pine Meadow Trail begins on the southeast side of the parkway. The road loosely parallels Stony Brook as it heads deeper into the park and serves the Reeves Meadow Visitor Center. The center is also a trailhead for the Reeves Brook Trail which is a 3.8 mile loop trail, with the Pine Meadow Trail passing the facility on its southeast side. Past the visitor center, the parallel alignments of Seven Lakes Drive and Johnsontown Road come to an end as the latter ends at a cul-de-sac adjacent to the former. The dead end serves as the trailhead for two hiking trails: the Blue Disc Trail, which starts just before the cul-de-sac; and the White Bar Trail, which begins at the cul-de-sac's northern end. Not far from this point, the Kakiat Trail crosses Seven Lakes Drive on its way toward Kakiat County Park.

Continuing on, Seven Lakes Drive begins to parallel the White Bar Trail as both head to the northeast through the rugged, forested terrain of the park. Eventually, the White Bar Trail splits from the parkway and proceeds to the north while Seven Lakes Drive remains on a generally northeasterly track. Stony Brook reaches its source at Lake Sebago, the first of the seven lakes the road passes, where the Tuxedo–Mount Ivy Trail briefly follows the parkway before turning off to the east. The parkway runs along the southeastern shore of Lake Sebago for just over 1 mile (1.6 km), passing a lakeside parking area and a ski trail. Past the lake, Seven Lakes Drive makes a slight turn to the north before intersecting with the Lake Welch Parkway by way of an elongated traffic circle. The road reverts to a northeasterly routing past the junction, briefly paralleling the Rockland–Orange county line as it runs past Lake Kanawauke's southeastern edge. Seven Lakes Drive crosses the county line near the lake's midpoint.

=== Orange and northern Rockland counties ===
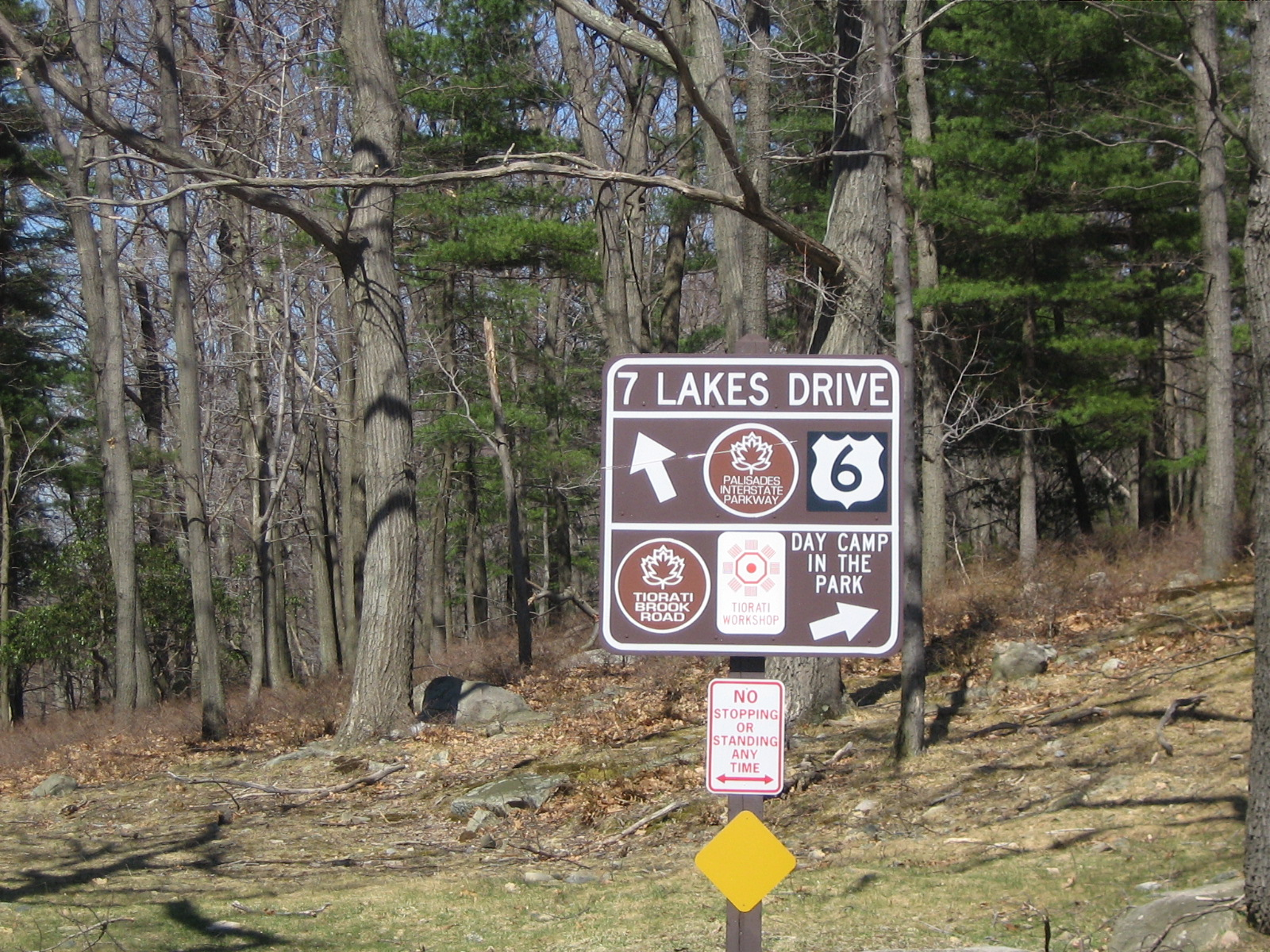
Signpost for Seven Lakes Drive at Tiorati Circle

The parkway continues to follow Lake Kanawauke to Kanawauke Circle, where it intersects with County Route 106 (CR 106), formerly part of NY 210. Not far from the junction, Seven Lakes Drive passes two more lakes, Lake Skannatati to the west and Lake Askoti to the east, as it slowly curves to the north. The parkway crosses the Long Path near Lake Skannatati and connects to a parking area near Lake Askoti. Another trail, the Red Cross Trail, traverses Seven Lakes Drive at the northern end of Lake Askoti. About a half-mile (0.8 km) north of Lake Askoti is Lake Tiorati, located along the eastern edge of the road. As the parkway runs past the lake, it turns back to the northeast and eventually reaches Tiorati Circle at the northern tip of the lake. The junction serves as the east end of Arden Valley Road, the west end of Tiorati Brook Road, and the trailhead of the Lake Tiorati Trail.

Seven Lakes Drive continues northeast from the circle, intersecting with several trails, including the Ramapo–Dunderberg Trail and the Appalachian Trail. A crossing of the Menomine Trail follows as the parkway turns to the east. The Menomine Trail follows Seven Lakes Drive for a short distance to nearby Silver Mine Lake on the south edge of the road. The Silver Mine Ski Road, a trail paralleling most of the lake, meets the parkway at the eastern lakeshore. From here, the road parallels Queensboro Brook for roughly 1 mile (1.6 km) to reach the Long Mountain Roundabout adjacent to Queensboro Lake, the last of the seven lakes from south to north. Here, Seven Lakes Drive directly intersects US 6 and indirectly connects to the nearby Palisades Interstate Parkway (PIP) by way of ramps leading away from the circle. Seven Lakes Drive follows US 6 through the circle, joining the route as both roads merge onto the PIP.

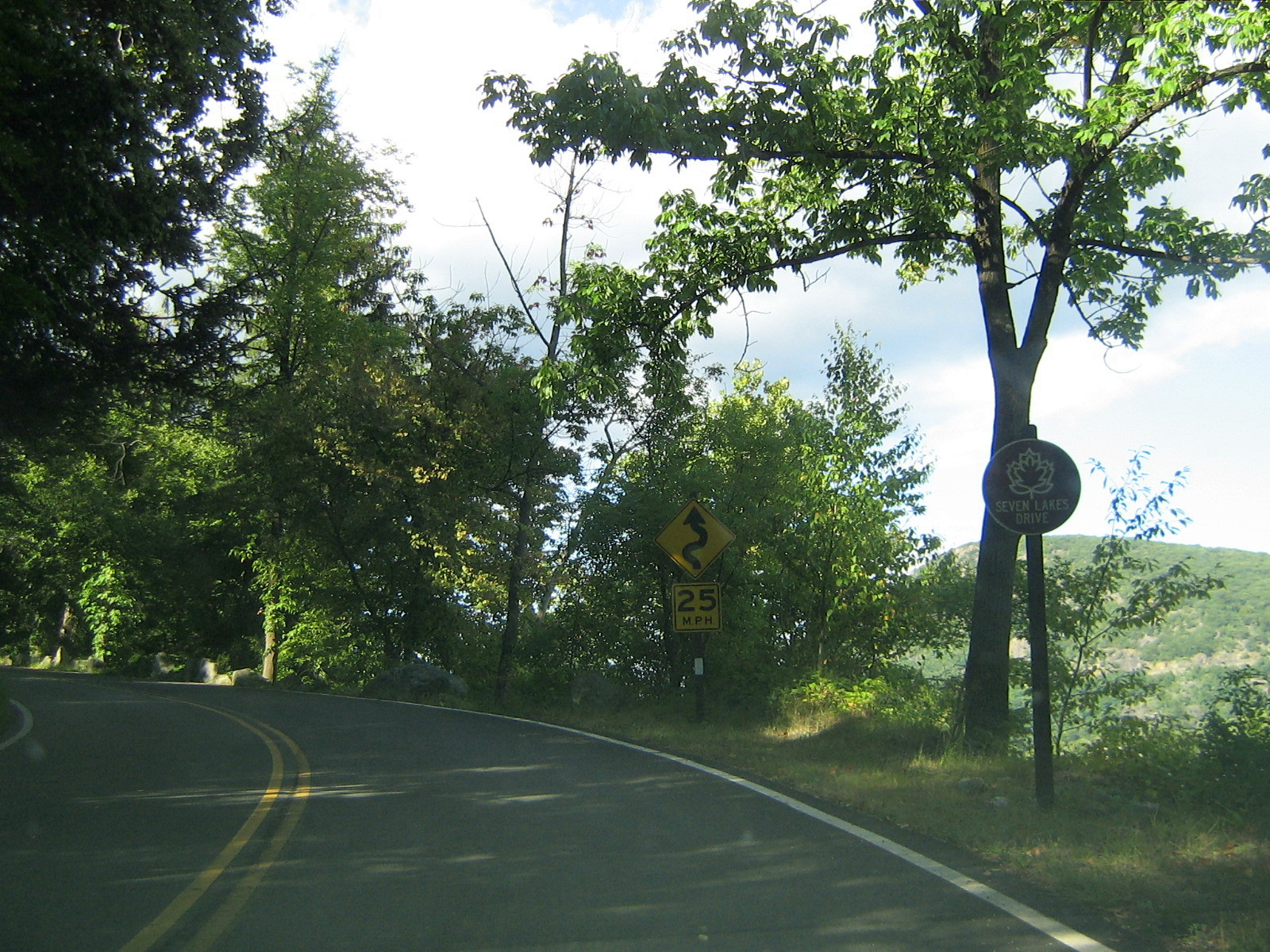
Seven Lakes Drive's eastern beginning at US 9W and US 202 in Bear Mountain State Park

The overlap with both US 6 and the PIP lasts for just 0.2 miles (0.32 km) as Seven Lakes Drive leaves the PIP at the next junction, a trumpet interchange southwest of Bear Mountain. Seven Lakes Drive heads eastward from the interchange as a two-lane surface road, running along the southern base of the large mountain as it intersects with several trails and passes seamlessly into the adjacent Bear Mountain State Park. Just east of the park boundary, the parkway crosses the county line once again, re-entering Rockland County near its northernmost point. At the southeastern edge of Bear Mountain, Seven Lakes Drive begins to descend a series of switchbacks as it enters the Hudson River valley. The road gradually makes its way to the western edge of the river, where it ends at an intersection with US 9W and US 202 due east of Bear Mountain's and just south of the Bear Mountain Bridge.

== History ==
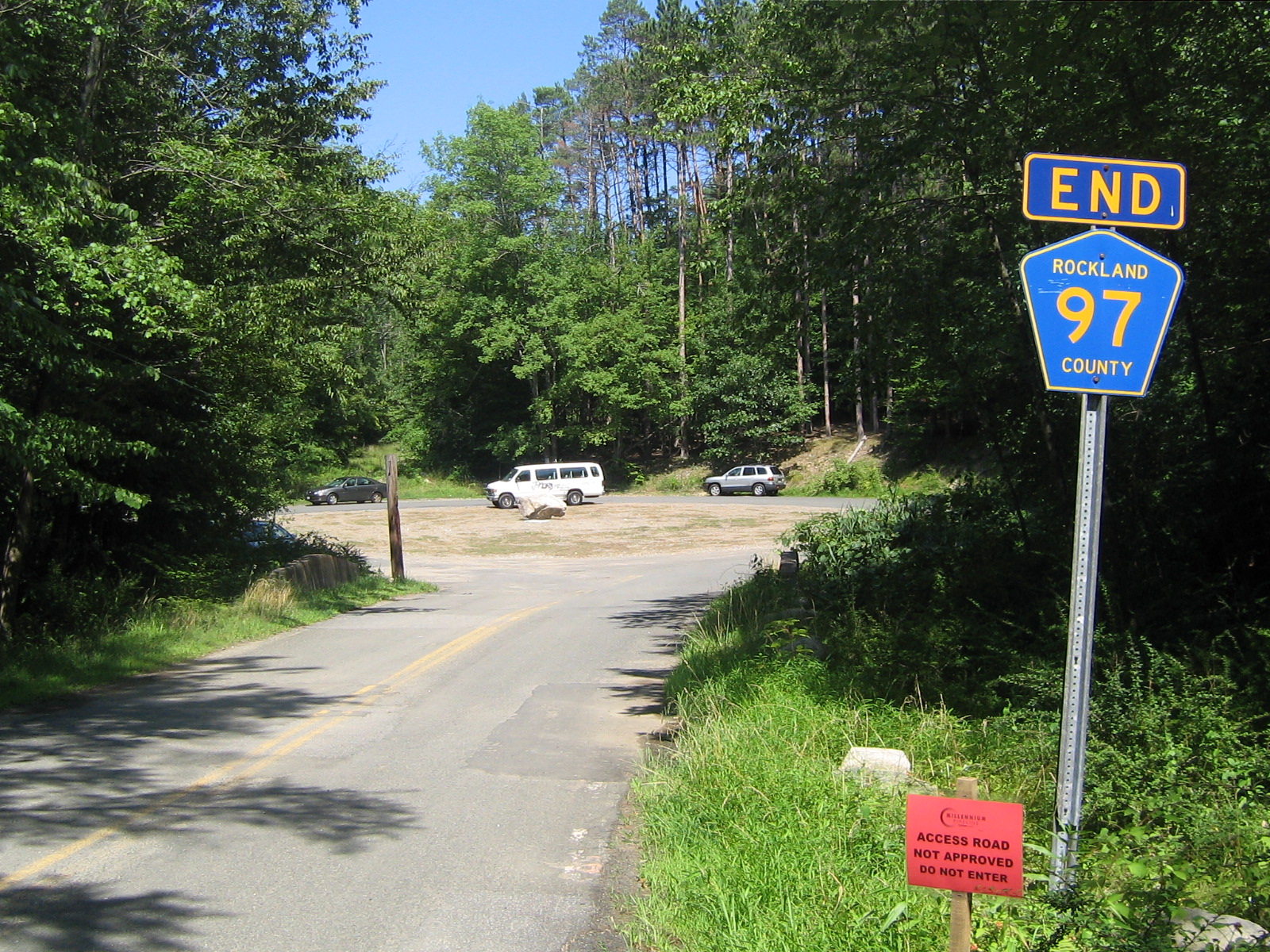
The cul-de-sac at the east end of Johnsontown Road (CR 97), located adjacent to Seven Lakes Drive

The origins of Seven Lakes Drive date as far back as the 1920s, by which time the basis for the modern road was in place from the southern tip of Lake Kanawauke to the banks of the Hudson River. At its south end, the parkway connected to Johnstown Road, which continued southwest to Sloatsburg and northeast to Lake Welch. The section of Johnstown Road southwest of this point was also known as Stony Brook Drive, named for its proximity to Stony Brook, a tributary of the Ramapo River. Stony Brook and Seven Lakes drives were renamed Seven Lakes Parkway c. 1962. Although the road's name has since reverted to Seven Lakes Drive, the Seven Lakes Parkway name is still used by NYSDOT for the section owned by PIPC and designated NY 987E.

In 1960, the state of New York made plans to construct a 7-mile (11 km) extension of Seven Lakes Drive leading southwest from Kanawauke Circle to Sloatsburg. As planned, it would be built in the then-Stony Brook Drive corridor as a straighter alternative to the original parkway. The new road was completed in 1962, lessening or eliminating several curves that existed in the old route. Most of what was originally Stony Brook Drive was dismantled as part of the route's construction; however, a 1.5-mile (2.4 km) section near Sloatsburg was left intact and renamed Johnsontown Road. The road only connects to Seven Lakes Drive at its west end; the east end of the parkway is at a cul-de-sac adjacent to where Seven Lakes Drive merges into Stony Brook Drive's old right-of-way. The 0.91-mile (1.46 km) portion of Johnsontown Road outside of the Sloatsburg village limits is now maintained by Rockland County as CR 97.

== Major intersections ==
County	Location	mi	km	Exit	Destinations	Notes
Rockland	Sloatsburg	0.00	0.00		NY 17 (Orange Turnpike)	Southern terminus
Rockland	Harriman State Park	5.33	8.58		Lake Welch Parkway south to CR 106 east / Palisades Parkway south – Lake Welch Beach	Modified roundabout; northern terminus of Lake Welch Parkway; Lake Welch Parkway signed as Lake Welch Drive
Orange	Harriman State Park	7.03	11.31		Kanawauke Road to St. Johns Road – Stony Point, Lake Welch Beach, Lake Kanawauke, Sterling Forest	Kanawauke Circle; former CR 106
Orange	Harriman State Park	10.34	16.64		Arden Valley Road west / Tiorati Brook Road east	Tiorati Circle; eastern terminus of Arden Valley Road; western terminus of Tiorati Brook Road
Orange	Harriman State Park	13.91	22.39	Southern end of freeway section		
Orange	Harriman State Park	13.91	22.39	18	US 6 west / Palisades Parkway south to I-87 Toll / New York Thruway / NY 17 – New York City, New Jersey, Central Valley	Long Mountain Circle; southern end of US 6/Palisades Parkway concurrency
Orange	Bear Mountain State Park	14.51	23.35	19	US 6 east / Palisades Parkway north – Bear Mountain Bridge	Northern end of US 6/Palisades Parkway concurrency
Orange	Bear Mountain State Park	14.51	23.35	Northern end of freeway section		
Rockland	Bear Mountain State Park	17.45	28.08		To US 9W south / US 202 west – Stony Point, Rockland Lake	Access via South Entrance Road
Rockland	Bear Mountain State Park	17.92	28.84		US 9W north / US 202 east – Bear Mountain Bridge	Northern terminus
1.000 mi = 1.609 km; 1.000 km = 0.621 mi: Concurrency terminus

== See also ==
- List of county routes in Rockland County, New York (76–118A)
