= Lake Tiorati =

- Location within New York
- Location: Harriman State Park, Orange County, New York
- Coordinates: 41°15′58″N 74°05′28″W
- Type: lake
- Basin countries: United States
- Surface area: 292 acres (118 ha)
- Surface elevation: 1,030 ft (314 m)

Lake Tiorati is one of the seven main lakes in Harriman State Park, located in Orange County, New York. It is a man-made lake, created by dredging swampland and constructing a concrete dam. The name Tiorati means "Blue like Sky". Its name is the Algonquin word for "sky-like". The Appalachian Trail passes by the lake along a mountain ridge to the west.

== Access ==
Lake Tiorati can be accessed from Exit 16 on the Palisades Interstate Parkway via Tiorati Brook Rd, Arden Valley Rd from NY-17, and Seven Lakes Drive from Exit 18 on the PIP or Sloatsburg. Tiorati Brook Rd and Arden Valley Rd are closed December 1 through April 1.

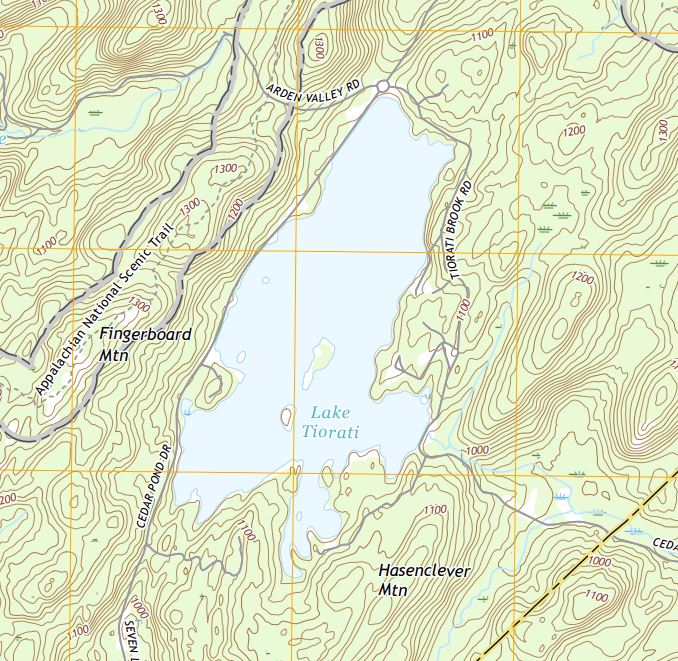
Excerpt from USGS's POPOLOPEN LAKE, NY QUADRANGLE, 7.5 minutes series

== Fauna ==
Among the fish to be found in Lake Tiorati are largemouth and smallmouth bass, bluegill, bullhead, pumpkinseed, white and yellow perch, and chain pickerel. The lake is a popular ice-fishing location.

== Activities ==
There is a public beach at the north end of the lake, maintained by the Palisades Interstate Park Commission, which is heavily used by swimmers. There are also campsites near the beach. Hiking is a frequent activity on the trails around the lake.

A restricted-access boat launch for rowboats, kayaks, and canoes is located at the southeast corner of the lake on Tiorati Brook Road. A boat sticker permit must be purchased from the Palisades Interstate Park Commission, and a key must be purchased for access to the Tiorati boat launch. Boat permits and boat launch keys are sold at the Tiorati Park office (located at Tiorati circle at the intersection between Seven Lakes Drive, Tiorati Brook Rd, and Arden Valley Rd).

== Geology ==
Geological formations near the lake have been studied by scientists researching continental drift.

== History ==
In 1983 the body of murdered millionaire arms dealer George M. Perry was found floating in Lake Tiorati.

== See also ==
- Lake Welch
- Harriman State Park (New York)
- Palisades Interstate Park Commission
- Palisades Interstate Parkway
