= Lake Welch Parkway =

- Lake Welch Parkway highlighted in red

Route information
- Maintained by NYSDOT
- Length: 5.60 mi (9.01 km)
- Existed: June 27, 1971–present
- Restrictions: No commercial vehicles; most of the parkway is closed from December to March

Major junctions
- South end: Seven Lakes Drive in Harriman State Park
- North end: Palisades Parkway / Tiorati Brook Road in Harriman State Park

Location
- Country: United States
- State: New York
- Counties: Rockland

Highway system
- New York Highways; Interstate; US; State; Reference; Parkways

The Lake Welch Parkway, sometimes labeled Lake Welch Drive, is a limited-access parkway located within Harriman State Park in southern New York in the United States. It extends for 5.60 miles (9.01 km) on a southwest–northeast alignment from an intersection with Seven Lakes Drive to a partial interchange with the Palisades Interstate Parkway. The highway is located entirely in Rockland County, although it runs close to the border with Orange County. It is inventoried by the New York State Department of Transportation as New York State Route 987A (NY 987A), an unsigned reference route; however, it is owned by the Palisades Interstate Park Commission. The portion of the Lake Welch Parkway that lies south of Tiorati Brook Road is closed during the winter. The parkway is the main route to access all beaches in Harriman State Park: Lake Welch, Lake Tiorati, and Lake Sebago (closed as of 2011).

== Route description ==
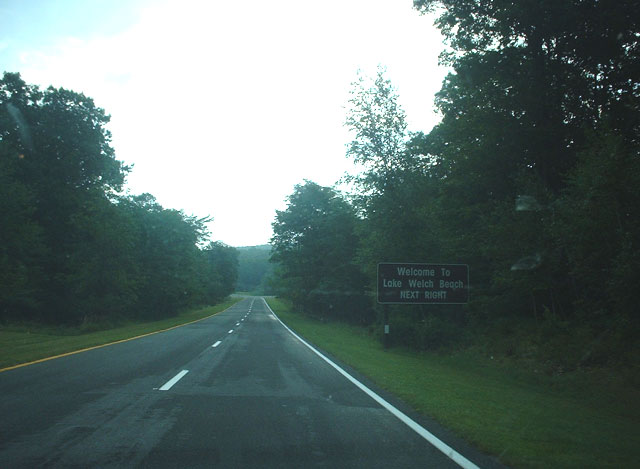
The Lake Welch Parkway approaching the access to Lake Welch Beach

The Lake Welch Parkway begins, heading north as a two-lane expressway, on the northbound side of Seven Lakes Drive. Although there is no direct connection with southbound Seven Lakes Drive, the section containing the interchange is widened to form a modified traffic circle, allowing U-turns on either side of this divider to permit access from both sides.

The next intersection north is with Johnsontown Road, a dirt road which parallels the Lake Welch Parkway, and used to run uninterrupted to Lake Welch, partially along the current parkway's right of way. It is now interrupted after 3/4 mi (1.2 km) at Pine Meadow Road, a service road for camp activities, at the next intersection with Lake Welch Parkway. A 1/2 mi (0.80 km) later, the parkway intersects with the St. John's Rd, which is paved; at the same point, the Long Path then crosses the parkway on its way up Nat House Mountain. There is a bridge 2/3 mi (1.1 km) later over County Route 106 (CR 106, Gate Hill Road and Kanawauke Rd, formerly NY 210,). There is no interchange between the Parkway and CR 106, but St. John's Rd provides access to CR 106, Lake Welch, and St. John's-in-the-Wilderness Church.

About 1 mile (1.6 km) northeast of the bridge, the parkway divides, forming a modified traffic circle with the access road to the Lake Welch recreation area (Beach and Picnic Area). The access road continues south to CR 106, forming another path between the two roads. Lake Welch Parkway continues as a two-lane undivided road for another mile to the vicinity of Tiorati Brook Road, where it widens into a divided highway once again. The parkway connects to the road by way of a Y-interchange with a northbound-to-southbound U-turn. North of Tiorati Brook Road (also known as Cedar Pond Road), the parkway is only open seasonally.

The median ends just east of the interchange with the Palisades Interstate Parkway (exit 16 of the Palisades). The first connection encountered of this interchange is the Palisades southbound exit ramp, which merges into Lake Welch Parkway southbound. This is followed by ramps to the Palisades southbound and from the Palisades northbound, where Lake Welch Parkway ends. It is only a partial interchange, lacking a connection between the Lake Welch Parkway northbound and the Palisades Parkway northbound. To access the Palisades Parkway northbound requires a 3-mile detour via Gate Hill Road.

== History ==
Lake Welch Parkway was conceived in the early 1960s as a new 2.19-mile-long (3.52 km) roadway through Harriman State Park. The new 24-foot-wide (7.3 m) road would connect Lake Welch Beach (which opened in 1962) to the Palisades Interstate Parkway via Tiorati Brook Road. The new roadway would be constructed by the Palisades Interstate Park Commission with a 292 feet (89 m) bridge over Tiorati Creek and two other smaller bridges along the right-of-way. The new parkway would temporarily terminate at Lake Welch Beach, where an extension down to Seven Lakes Drive would be constructed. Engineers estimated the first section of the Lake Welch Parkway to cost $4.13 million (1962 USD) to build, and contracts would be let in Albany on November 16, 1962.

Construction of the second segment between Seven Lakes Drive and Lake Welch Beach was announced in November 1967 with the letting of a contract to County Asphalt Incorporated, a firm based in Tarrytown. The contract was for $2,275,744 (1967 USD) and would construct the final 3.43 miles (5.52 km) of Lake Welch Parkway. The firm won the contract as the lowest of four bidders. The extension would also be 24 feet (7.3 m) wide beginning at the Sebago Circle along Seven Lakes Drive. In addition to the new right-of-way, an additional 0.84 miles (1.35 km) of right-of-way would be used to access the extension with Lake Welch Beach. Also included a project was a bridge over then-NY 210 (now CR 106). The slated completion date of the project was December 3, 1969 and would be supervised by the New York State Department of Transportation and its engineer out of Poughkeepsie.

Construction was completed nearly four years later, with the new Lake Welch Parkway opening to traffic on June 27, 1971, a little more than 9 years after the opening of Lake Welch Beach. The new parkway, 5.75 miles (9.25 km) long, intended to relieve congestion along NY 210 in access to Lake Welch Beach, and would connect to the Palisades Interstate Parkway at exit 14A (current exit 16).

== Exit list ==
The entire route is in Harriman State Park, Rockland County. All exits are unnumbered.

mi	km	Destinations	Notes
0.00	0.00	Seven Lakes Drive	Modified roundabout; southern terminus
3.40	5.47	To CR 106 (Kanawauke Road) – St. John's Church, Welch Beach	At-grade intersection; access via St. Johns Road
5.10	8.21	Tiorati Brook Road west	Northbound access is via center median u-turn ramp; eastern terminus of Tiorati Brook Road
5.60	9.01	Palisades Parkway south	Northern terminus; exit 16 on Palisades Parkway
1.000 mi = 1.609 km; 1.000 km = 0.621 mi
