= New York State Route 210 =

State highway in Orange County, New York, US

New York State Route 210
- Map of southern Orange County and northern New Jersey with NY 210 highlighted in red

Route information
- Maintained by NYSDOT
- Length: 4.04 mi (6.50 km)
- Existed: 1930–present

Major junctions
- South end: CR 511 at the New Jersey state line in Warwick
- North end: NY 17A in Greenwood Lake

Location
- Country: United States
- State: New York
- Counties: Orange

Highway system
- New York Highways; Interstate; US; State; Reference; Parkways
← US 209	→ NY 211

New York State Route 210 (NY 210) is a state highway in Orange County, New York, in the United States. It runs north from the New Jersey state line—where it continues south as Passaic County Route 511 (CR 511)—along the west shore of Greenwood Lake to the eponymous village of Greenwood Lake, where it ends at a junction with NY 17A. It was once much longer, as it originally extended east along NY 17A and CR 106 in Orange and Rockland counties to Stony Point when it was assigned as part of the 1930 renumbering of state highways in New York. The route was truncated to its current length in 1982. Prior to becoming NY 210 in 1930, the road alongside Greenwood Lake was part of NY 55, a route connecting New Jersey to Goshen, in the 1920s.

== Route description ==
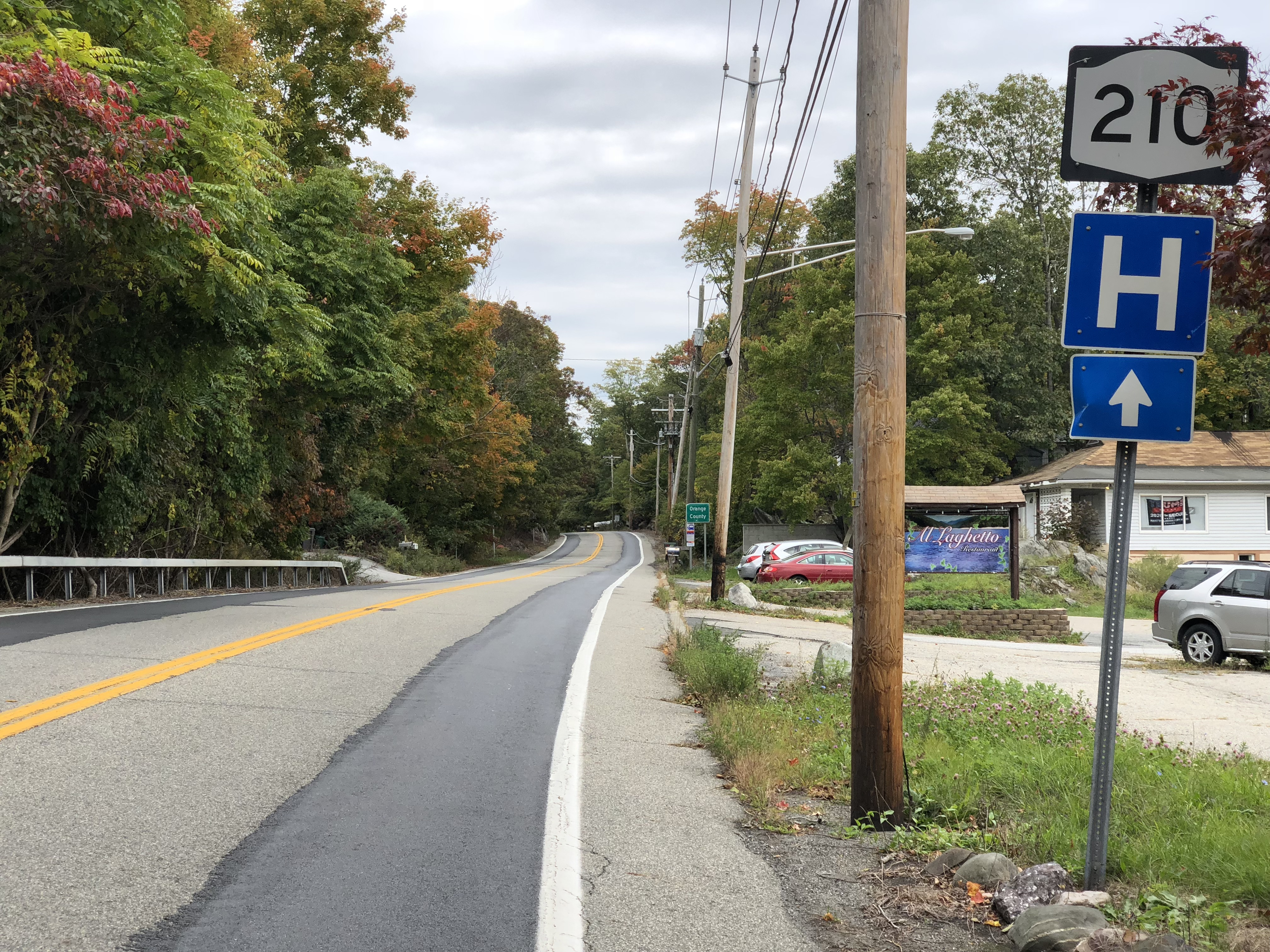
NY 210 northbound past its southern terminus at CR 511 at the New Jersey border in Warwick

NY 210 commences at the New York–New Jersey state line in the town of Warwick, where it connects to CR 511 in West Milford Township, Passaic County, New Jersey. Like CR 511 in New Jersey, NY 210 is the primary lakeside roadway along Greenwood Lake, an interstate lake located roughly equally in New Jersey and New York. NY 210 heads north from the state line along the western edge of the base of a deep valley surrounding the lake to a community known as Indian Park, entirely situated on the steep incline leading away from the lake. The route continues on to the eponymous village of Greenwood Lake, located at the northern tip of the lake.

NY 210 enters the village center from the west on Jersey Avenue. It follows the village street for four blocks to Windermere Avenue, where it turns to follow that street to the northeast. The route terminates nine blocks later upon intersecting NY 17A north of the village center.

== History ==
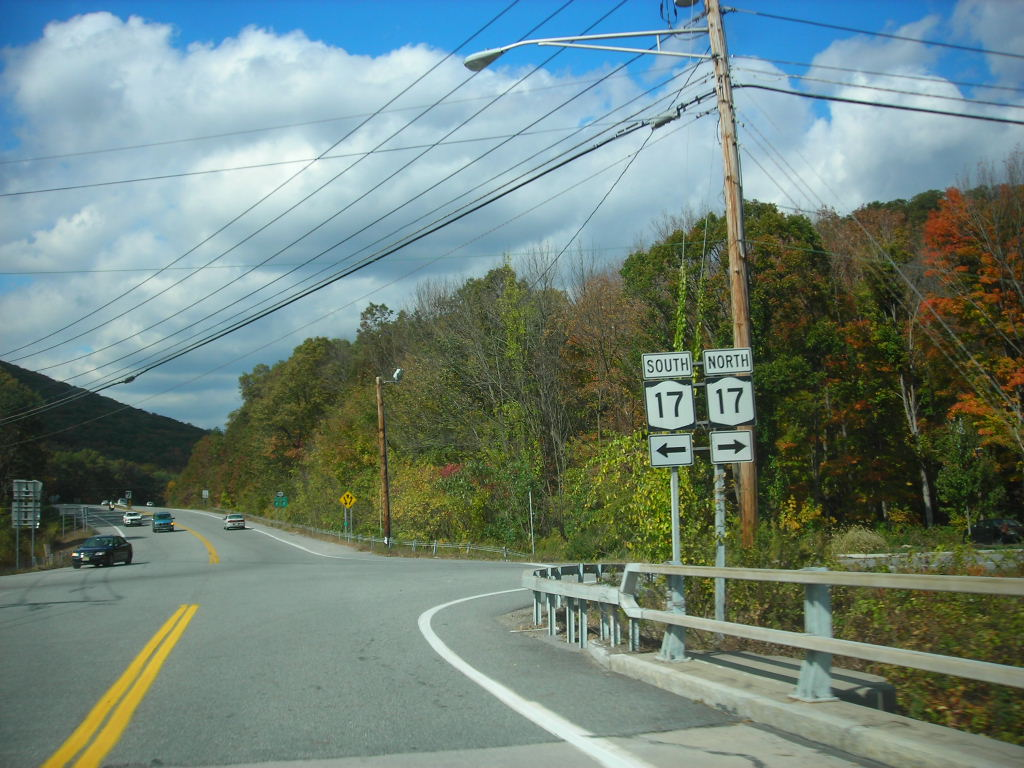
Junction of NY 17 and NY 17A in Southfields. From 1930 to 1982, NY 210 entered this intersection from the background on NY 17A and left in the foreground on modern CR 106.

=== Old roads ===
From 1930 to 1982, NY 210 extended eastward into Rockland County. This 20-mile (32 km) extension was primarily made up of several highways that were previously part of a privately maintained road. On March 10, 1824, the New York State Legislature passed a law incorporating the Monroe and Haverstraw Road Company. The new company was tasked with building a turnpike from the hamlet of Monroe (now Southfields) east to the town of Haverstraw, where it ended at a fork in the road somewhere in the town. The turnpike company ceased to exist on April 28, 1870, when the legislature passed a law repealing the 1824 document that created the turnpike company. The highway was subsequently sold off in order to pay off the debts of the company and to finance repairs to bridges along the road.

When Harriman State Park opened in 1910, the Monroe–Haverstraw highway was renamed Southfields Road. Three years later, a portion of the route became part of Seven Lakes Drive, a major highway built to traverse the park. In 1916, Rockland County numbered its highways for the first time. The Rockland County section of the former Monroe and Haverstraw Road was designated as CR 416 at this time. From 1919 to 1920, the highway was reconstructed and rebuilt to state standards.

=== Designation ===
In the late 1920s, what is now NY 210 was originally designated as part of NY 55, a connector between NY 17 in Goshen and the New Jersey state line south of the village of Greenwood Lake. In the 1930 renumbering of state highways in New York, NY 55 was incorporated into two longer routes: NY 210 from New Jersey to Greenwood Lake and NY 17A from Greenwood Lake to Goshen. Initially, NY 17A ended in Greenwood Lake while NY 210 continued east to U.S. Route 9W (US 9W) on the banks of the Hudson River in West Haverstraw. From Greenwood Lake to Southfields, NY 210 was routed on modern NY 17A. The route continued east from there along Southfields Road to the eastern fringe of Harriman State Park, at which point it headed to West Haverstraw via Willow Grove and Letchworth Village roads, Suffern Lane, and Railroad Avenue.

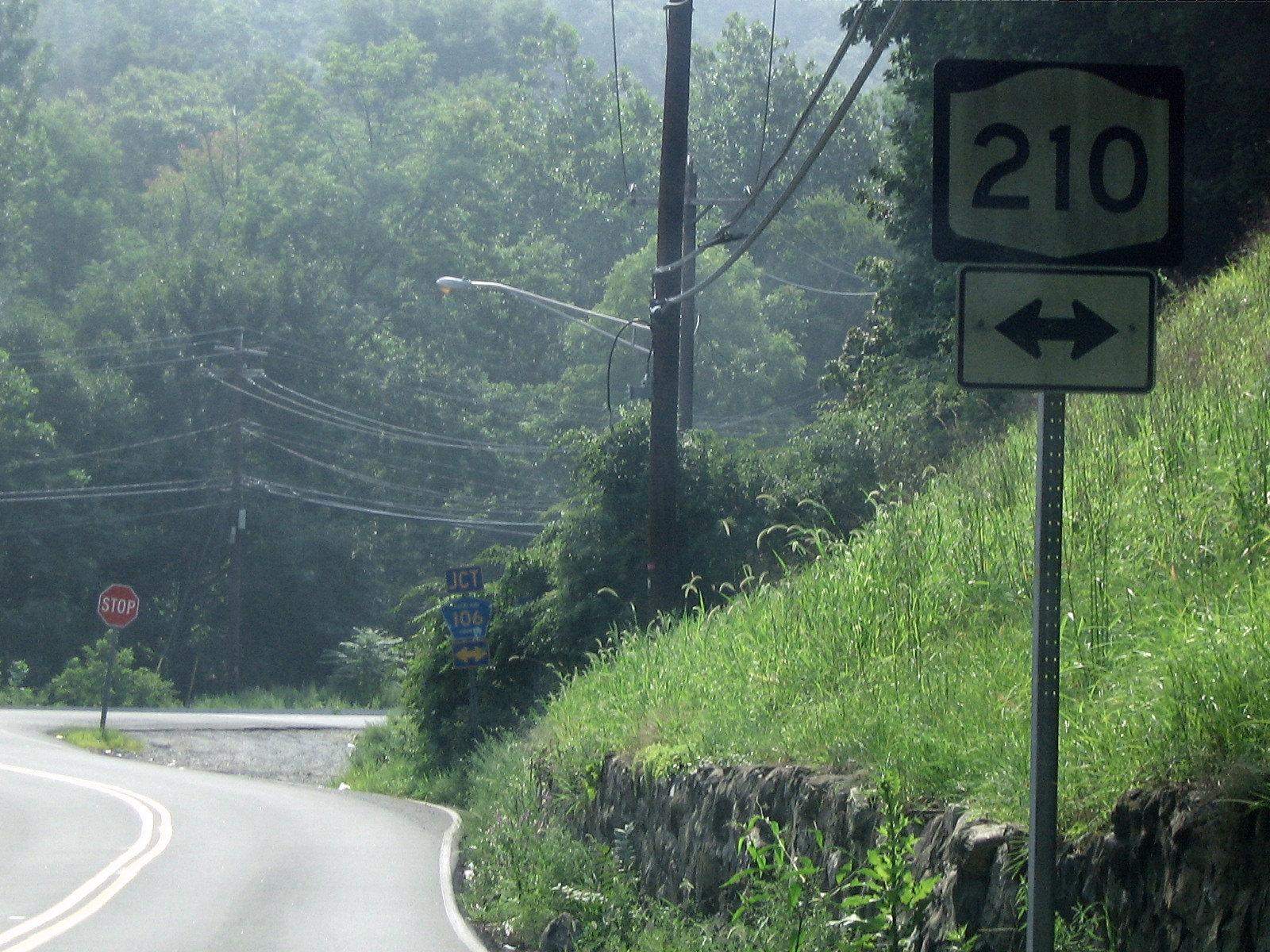
Sign assembly for NY 210 at CR 106 (former NY 210) in Rockland County

By 1933, NY 17A was extended eastward along NY 210 to Southfields, completing the alternate loop of NY 17, while NY 210 was realigned on its east end by 1938 to end at US 9W in Stony Point. Instead of following Willow Grove Road, the highway remained on modern Gate Hill Road to the vicinity of Stony Point, where it entered the hamlet on Main Street. It was rerouted again between 1968 and 1973 to bypass Main Street to the south on Central Drive.

On April 1, 1980, ownership and maintenance of the portion of NY 210 from NY 17 to the Orange–Rockland county line was transferred from the state of New York to Orange County as part of a highway maintenance swap between the two levels of government. Two years later, the portion of the route within Rockland County was turned over from the state to the county. As a result, NY 210 was truncated to the former western terminus of its overlap with NY 17A in Greenwood Lake. The former routing of NY 210 was designated as CR 106 in both Orange and Rockland counties. The Orange side was turned over the Palisades Interstate Park Commission on January 1, 2014.

=== Accidents ===
Over the years, at least two fatal accidents have occurred on the portion of NY 210 that runs alongside Greenwood Lake. On July 15, 1940, a Brooklyn couple was killed when their car struck a stone ledge near the lake. Two others were injured in the accident. On December 1, 1968, three were killed and one person was injured when two cars had a head-on collision just north of the New Jersey state line.

== Major intersections ==
The entire route is in Orange County.

Location	mi	km	Destinations	Notes
Town of Warwick	0.00	0.00	CR 511 south	Continuation into New Jersey; hamlet of Sterling Forest
Greenwood Lake	4.04	6.50	NY 17A to NY 17 – Warwick, Monroe, Sterling Forest	Northern terminus
1.000 mi = 1.609 km; 1.000 km = 0.621 mi
