= Parkways in New York =

Highway system

- Standard parkway markers in New York

Highway names
- Interstates: Interstate X (I-X)
- US Highways: U.S. Route X (US X)
- State: New York State Route X (NY X)

System links
- New York Highways; Interstate; US; State; Reference; Parkways

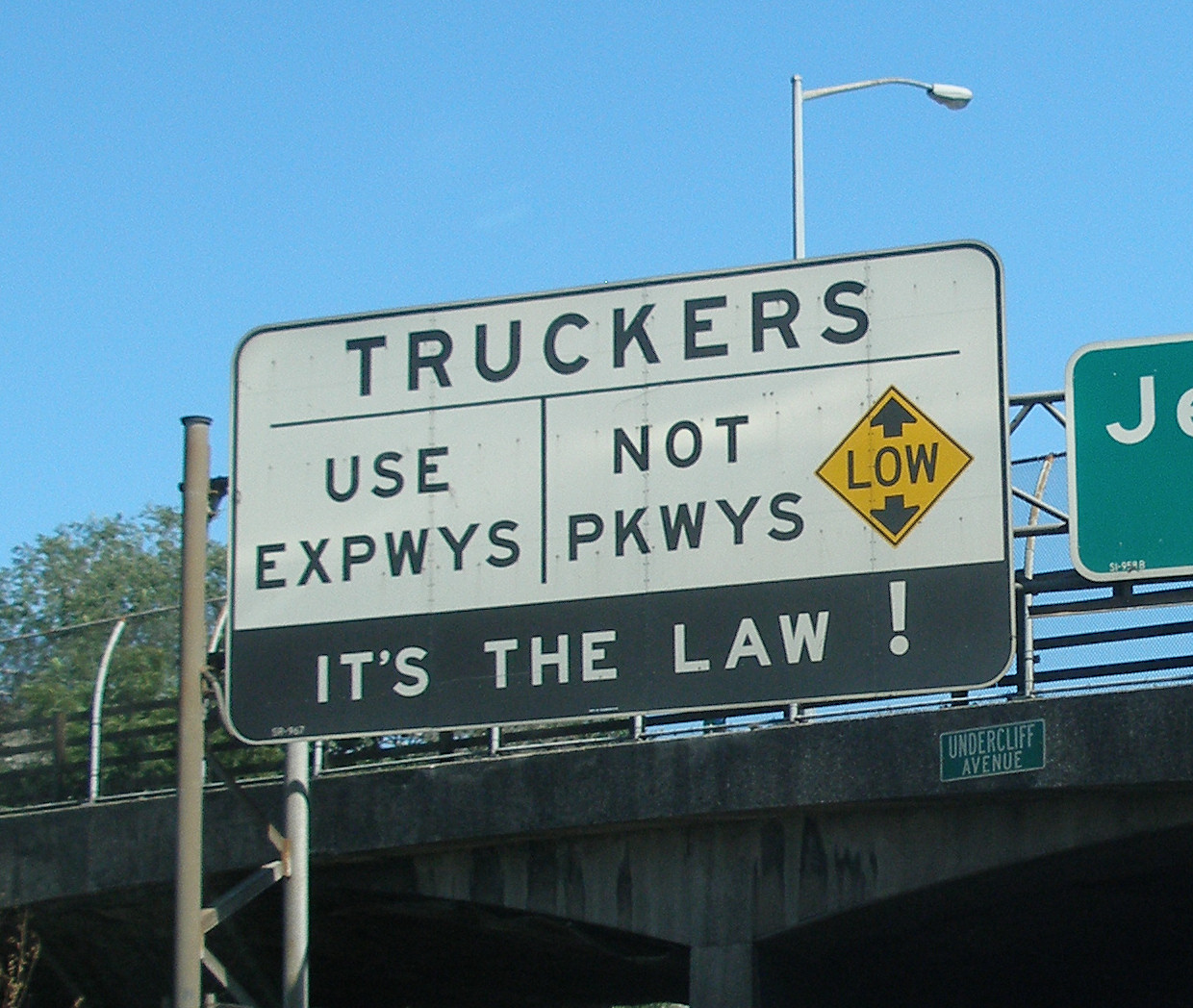
Sign informing truckers it is illegal to use a parkway in New York City.

Most parkways in the US state of New York are part of a statewide parkway system owned by several public and private agencies such as New York City Department of Transportation (NYCDOT) and New York State Office of Parks, Recreation and Historic Preservation (NYS OPRHP) but mostly maintained by the New York State Department of Transportation (NYSDOT). A handful of other roads in the Hudson Valley and on Long Island are also known as parkways but are not part of the state system. The roads of the state parkway system were among the first expressways to be constructed. These highways were not divided and allowed no driveway cuts, but did have intersections for some of the streets they crossed. A small section of the privately financed Long Island Motor Parkway was the first expressway to begin operation as a toll road and the first highway to use bridges and overpasses to eliminate intersections.

The individual parkways vary widely in composition. Some, such as the Sprain Brook Parkway, are functionally equivalent to a freeway; others, like Seven Lakes Drive, are two-lane undivided roads. Most parkways are located in downstate New York, where the state parkway system originated in the early 20th century.

== State parkways ==
The state's parkway system originally began as a series of then-high-speed (25 miles per hour or 40 kilometres per hour) four-lane roads that were created to provide a scenic way into, out of, and around New York City. The first section of this system opened in 1908. Most of the early roads have been replaced and redesigned to address higher speed requirements and to increase capacity. In later sections north of New York City, the roadways were typically divided by a wide landscaped median and provided service areas along the way that offered fuel and restrooms. During the 1930s, urban planner Robert Moses developed a system of parkways in the New York City area.

Many of these parkways were built by regional agencies such as the Long Island State Park Commission (LISPC), New York City Parks Department, Taconic State Park Commission (TSPC), Westchester County Parks Commission (WCPC), and Palisades Interstate Park Commission (PIPC). Most are now maintained, if not owned, by NYSDOT outside New York City and the New York City Department of Transportation (NYCDOT) within New York City.

Today, the state parkways are for the most part equivalent to expressways and freeways built in other parts of the country, except for a few oddities. First, because many of these roads were either designed before civil engineers had experience building roads for automobile use or widened in response to increasing traffic, many New York parkways lack shoulders. Second, because designers focused more on making routes scenic rather than efficient, the parkways are meandering, often built to follow a river, and so contain many turns. Finally, because most use low, decorative stone-arch overpasses that would trap trucks, commercial vehicles, trucks and tractor trailers are banned from parkways. In Manhattan, this has led to nearly all trucks being forced onto local streets as the island has only one short Interstate (the Trans-Manhattan Expressway) passing through Washington Heights, a neighborhood in Upper Manhattan.

=== List of parkways ===
Parkway	Opened	Region	From	To	Owner	Maintained by
Bay Parkway	1892 as 22nd Avenue	New York City	Brooklyn	Brooklyn	NYSDOT/NYCDOT	NYSDOT
Bay Parkway	N/A	Long Island	Jones Beach State Park	Jones Beach State Park	NYS OPRHP	NYSDOT/NYS OPRHP
Bear Mountain State Parkway	1932	Hudson Valley	Peekskill	Cortlandt	NYSDOT	NYSDOT
Belt Parkway	1941	New York City	Brooklyn	Queens	NYSDOT/NYCDOT	NYSDOT/NYCDOT
Bethpage State Parkway	1936	Long Island	Massapequa	Bethpage State Park	NYS OPRHP	NYSDOT/NYS OPRHP
Bronx River Parkway	1908	Hudson Valley	The Bronx	North Castle	NYCDOT/Westchester County	NYCDOT/Westchester County
Cross County Parkway	1947	Hudson Valley	Yonkers	Eastchester	NYSDOT	NYSDOT
Cross Island Parkway	1940	New York City	Queens	Queens	NYCDOT	NYCDOT
Eastern Parkway	1874	New York City	Brooklyn	Brooklyn	NYCDOT	NYCDOT
Franklin D. Roosevelt East River Drive	1955	New York City	Lower Manhattan	Upper Manhattan	NYSDOT/NYCDOT	NYSDOT/NYCDOT
Grand Central Parkway	1936	New York City	Queens	New York City line	NYSDOT	NYSDOT
Harlem River Drive	1964	New York City	Upper Manhattan	Upper Manhattan	NYSDOT	NYSDOT
Heckscher State Parkway	1959	Long Island	West Islip	Heckscher State Park	NYS OPRHP	NYSDOT/NYS OPRHP
Henry Hudson Parkway	1937	New York City	Manhattan	New York City line	NYSDOT/NYCDOT/PANYNJ	NYSDOT/NYCDOT/PANYNJ
Hutchinson River Parkway	1928	Hudson Valley	The Bronx	Connecticut state line	NYSDOT/NYCDOT	NYSDOT/NYCDOT
Jackie Robinson Parkway	1935	New York City	Brooklyn	Queens	NYCDOT	NYSDOT
Korean War Veterans Parkway	1972	New York City	Staten Island	Staten Island	NYSDOT	NYSDOT
Lake Ontario State Parkway		Western New York	Carlton	Rochester	NYSDOT/NYS OPRHP	NYSDOT
Little Neck Parkway		New York City	Queens	Queens		
Lake Welch Parkway	1971	Hudson Valley	Harriman State Park	Harriman State Park	PIPC	NYSDOT
Long Mountain Parkway		Hudson Valley	Harriman State Park	Bear Mountain State Park	NYSDOT	NYSDOT
Loop Parkway	1934	Long Island	Lido Beach	Jones Beach State Park	NYS OPRHP	NYSDOT
Meadowbrook State Parkway	1934	Long Island	Jones Beach State Park	Westbury	NYS OPRHP	NYSDOT/NYS OPRHP
Mosholu Parkway	1937	New York City	Bronx Park	Van Cortlandt Park	NYSDOT/NYCDOT	NYSDOT/NYCDOT
Niagara Scenic Parkway		Western New York	Niagara Falls	Porter	NYS OPRHP	NYSDOT
Northern State Parkway	1931	Long Island	New York City line	Hauppauge	NYS OPRHP	NYSDOT
Ocean Parkway		New York City	Brooklyn	Brooklyn		
Ocean Parkway	1934	Long Island	Jones Beach State Park	Captree State Park	NYS OPRHP	NYSDOT/NYS OPRHP
Palisades Interstate Parkway	1958	Hudson Valley	Fort Lee, NJ	Bear Mountain State Park	PIPC	NYSDOT/NJDOT
Pelham Parkway	1911	New York City	The Bronx	Pelham Bay Park	NYCDOT	NYCDOT
Prospect Mountain Veterans Memorial Highway	1969	Adirondacks	Lake George	Prospect Mountain	NYSDEC	NYSDEC
Robert Moses Causeway	1951	Long Island	Robert Moses State Park	West Islip	NYS OPRHP	NYSDOT/NYS OPRHP
Rockaway Parkway		New York City	Brooklyn	Brooklyn		
Sagtikos State Parkway	1952	Long Island	West Islip	Commack	NYS OPRHP	NYSDOT
Saw Mill River Parkway	1954	Hudson Valley	New York City line	Bedford	NYS OPRHP	NYSDOT
Seven Lakes Drive		Hudson Valley	Sloatsburg	Bear Mountain State Park	PIPC	NYSDOT
Southern State Parkway	1949	Long Island	Valley Stream	West Islip	NYS OPRHP	NYSDOT
Sprain Brook Parkway	1961	Hudson Valley	Yonkers	Hawthorne	NYSDOT	NYSDOT
Sunken Meadow State Parkway	1957	Long Island	Commack	Sunken Meadow State Park	NYS OPRHP	NYSDOT/NYS OPRHP
Taconic State Parkway	1925	Hudson Valley	North Castle	East Chatham	NYSDOT	NYSDOT
Wantagh State Parkway	1929	Long Island	Jones Beach State Park	Westbury	NYS OPRHP	NYSDOT/NYS OPRHP
Whiteface Mountain Veterans Memorial Highway	1935	Adirondacks	Wilmington	Whiteface Mountain	NYSDEC	NYSDEC

== Other parkways ==
Some regions of New York have parkways that are not owned or maintained by a state agency. Westchester County, for example, contains some highways that were originally part of the TSPC and WCPC, while Suffolk County has preserved a section of the former Long Island Motor Parkway (LIMP) for current driving and built their own roads on land originally reserved for the LISPC. The surviving remnant of the LIMP in western Suffolk County, named the Vanderbilt Motor Parkway, became a surface road that is no longer an expressway nor off limits to commercial vehicles.

=== List of parkways ===
Parkway	Opened	Region	From	To	Owner	Maintained by
Arden Valley Road	1922	Hudson Valley	Harriman State Park	Harriman State Park	PIPC	PIPC
Central Westchester Parkway		Hudson Valley	White Plains	White Plains	Westchester County	Westchester County
Farragut Parkway		Hudson Valley	Hastings-on-Hudson	Hastings-on-Hudson	Westchester County	Westchester County
Fire Island Beach Road		Long Island	Fire Island	Fire Island	Suffolk County	Suffolk County
Memorial Parkway		Mohawk Valley	Genesee Street, Utica	Albany Street, Utica	City of Utica	City of Utica
Playland Parkway	1929	Hudson Valley	Harrison	Playland	Westchester County	Westchester County
Tiorati Brook Road		Hudson Valley	Harriman State Park	Bear Mountain State Park	PIPC	PIPC
Vanderbilt Motor Parkway		Long Island	Melville	Lake Ronkonkoma	Suffolk County	Suffolk County
William Floyd Parkway		Long Island	Fire Island	Rocky Point	Suffolk County	Suffolk County
