= William A. Welch =

American engineer and environmentalist

Major William Addams Welch (August 20, 1868 – May 4, 1941) was an American engineer and environmentalist who would have a major impact on the state and national park systems of the United States. Born in Cynthiana, Kentucky, he obtained a civil engineering degree from Colorado College in 1882 and a master's degree from the University of Virginia in 1886.

== Background ==
In the 1890s, working for the U.S. government in Alaska, he assembled the first iron steamship to be built in that territory. He also designed railroads in southwest Mexico, Ecuador, Colombia and Venezuela, and worked on the legendary 228-mile (367 km) Madeira-Mamoré Railway in Bolivia. In 1907, yellow fever forced him to return to the U.S. where he worked for John C. and Frederick Law Olmsted.

In 1912, he was hired as assistant engineer by George W. Perkins, chairman of the newly formed Palisades Interstate Park Commission (PIP), and in 1914, he was made chief engineer and general manager. Under his leadership, Bear Mountain State Park and Harriman State Park grew from an initial 10,000 acres (40 km^{2}) to 43,000 acres (170 km^{2}). By 1919, it was estimated that a million people a year were coming to the park. In the early 1920s, Welch's engineering work gained nationwide attention when he built Storm King Highway into the sheer cliffs above the Hudson River north of Bear Mountain.

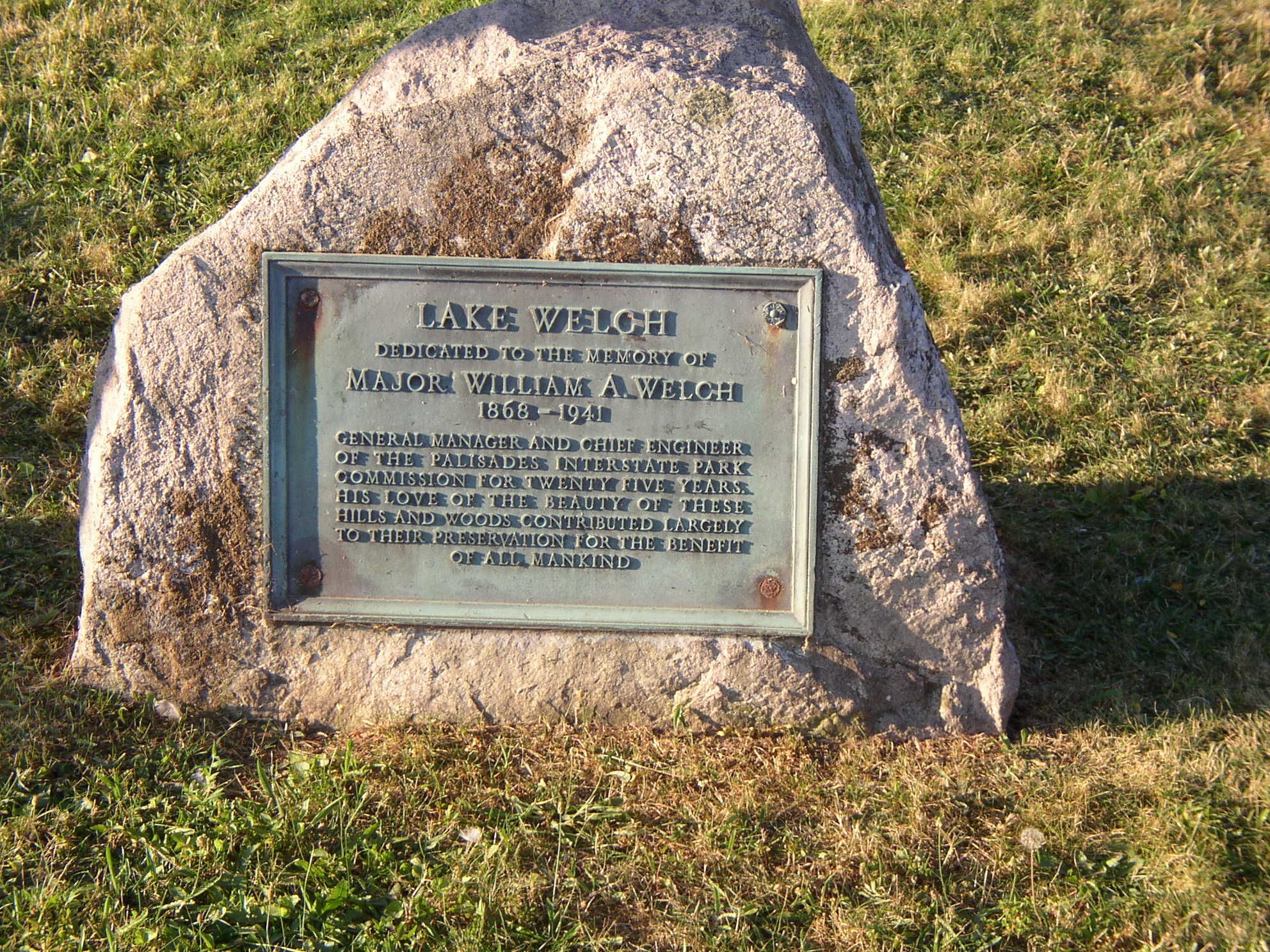
Plaque dedicated for Welch in Harriman State Park

When Welch started work on Bear Mountain State Park and Harriman State Park, there were no existing models or precedents to guide him. Welch organized a massive reforestation program, built 23 new lakes, a hundred miles of scenic drives and 103 children's camps, where 65,000 urban children enjoyed the outdoors each summer. He helped found the Palisades Interstate Park Trail Conference and served as chairman of the Appalachian Trail Conference.

The Boy Scouts of America presented the Silver Buffalo Award to Welch in 1927 for his work in engineering and conservation. Lake Welch in Harriman State Park is named after him.
