= County Route 106 (Rockland County, New York) =

Highway in Rockland County, New York

County Route 106

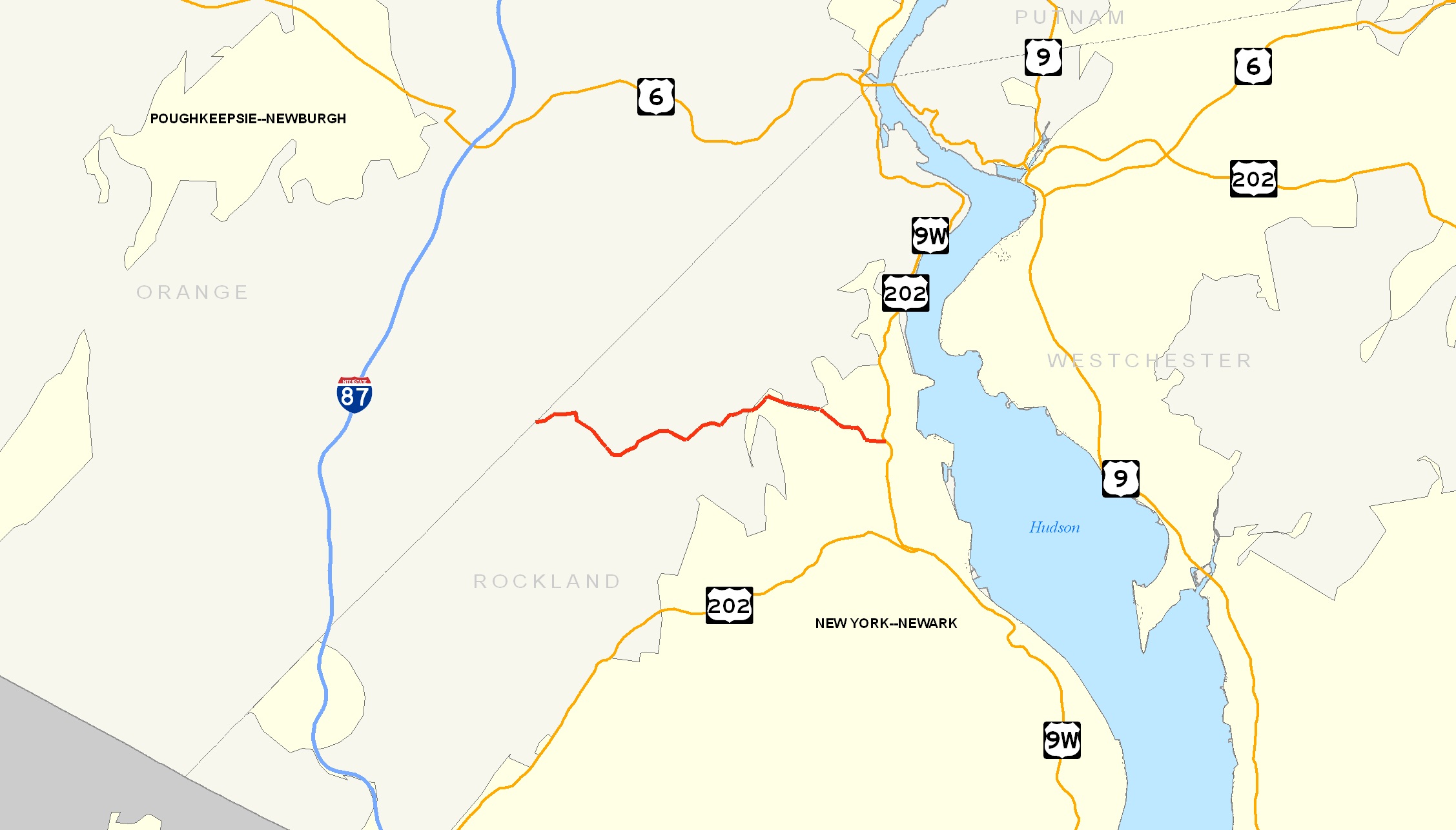

Route information
- Maintained by Rockland County Highway Department
- Length: 7.8 mi (12.6 km)
- Existed: 1982–present

Major junctions
- West end: Kanawauke Road in Harriman State Park
- Palisades Parkway in Harriman State Park
- East end: US 9W / US 202 in Stony Point

Location
- Country: United States
- State: New York
- County: Rockland

Highway system
- County routes in New York; County Routes in Rockland County

County Route 106 (CR 106) is a 7.8-mile (12.6 km) east–west county route in Rockland County, New York, in the United States. It serves as an eastward continuation of Kanawauke Road (former Orange CR 106), extending from the Orange County line to U.S. Route 9W (US 9W) and US 202 in Stony Point via Harriman State Park. CR 106 intersects with several county highways in Rockland County along the way. The route was only one of two in Rockland County to keep its numbering from Orange County, with the other being CR 72. CR 106 had one spur route, CR 106A, which was recently decommissioned.

The route was originally designated County Highway 416 in the 1920s and 1930s. In 1930, it became the easternmost part of New York State Route 210 (NY 210), a state highway continuing westward into Orange County. In 1982, NY 210 was truncated to end in Greenwood Lake, and its former routing east of NY 17 was replaced by CR 106 in Orange and Rockland counties. CR 106 in Orange County was decommissioned on January 1, 2014, when maintenance was transferred to the Palisades Interstate Park Commission.

== Route description ==
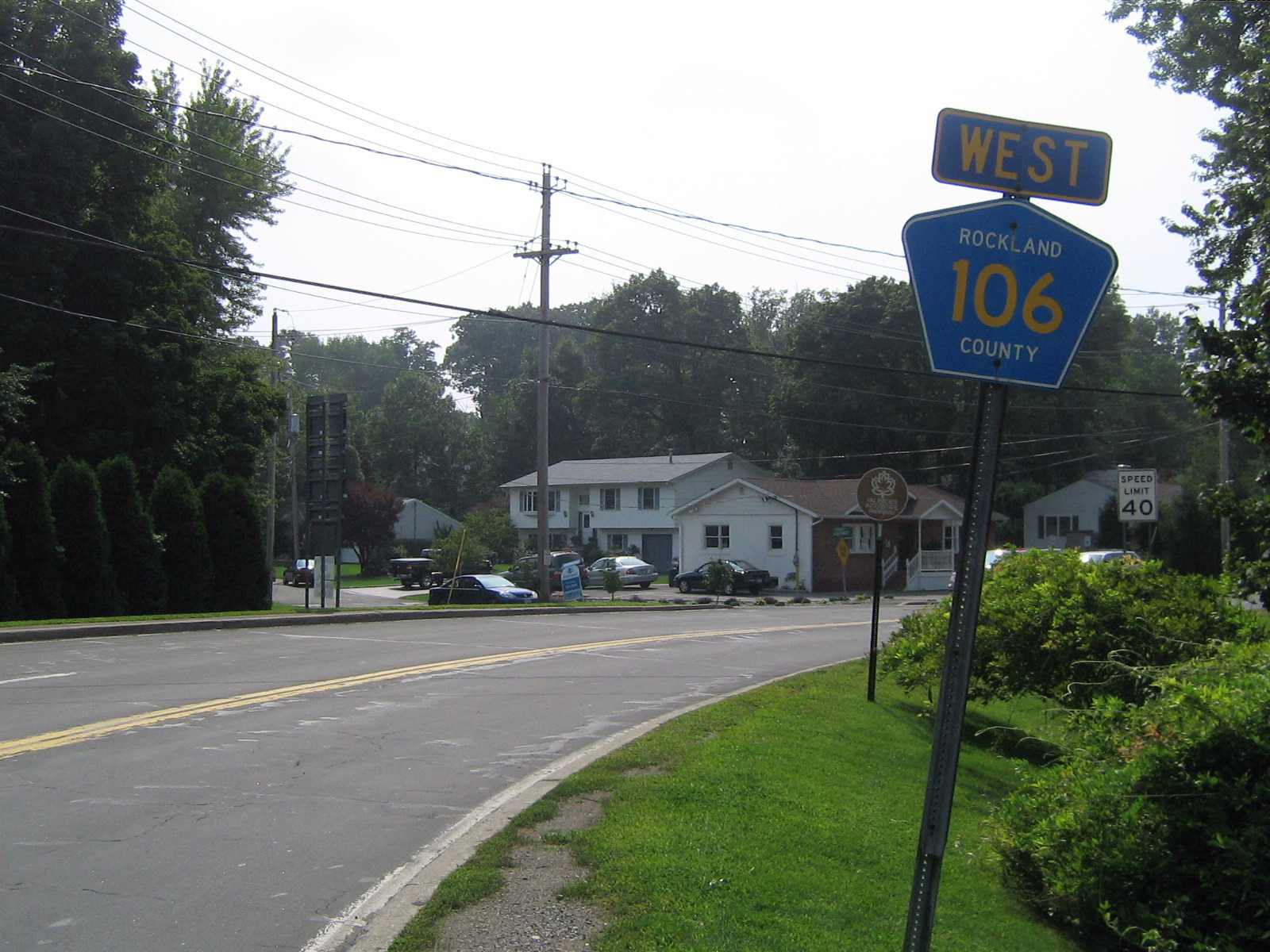
CR 106 begins here in Stony Point, and heads west providing an intersection with the Palisades Parkway.

CR 106 begins at the Orange County line in Harriman State Park as a continuation of Kanawauke Road (formerly that county's CR 106). The route was only one of two county routes that have the same number in both Rockland and Orange counties; the other is CR 72.

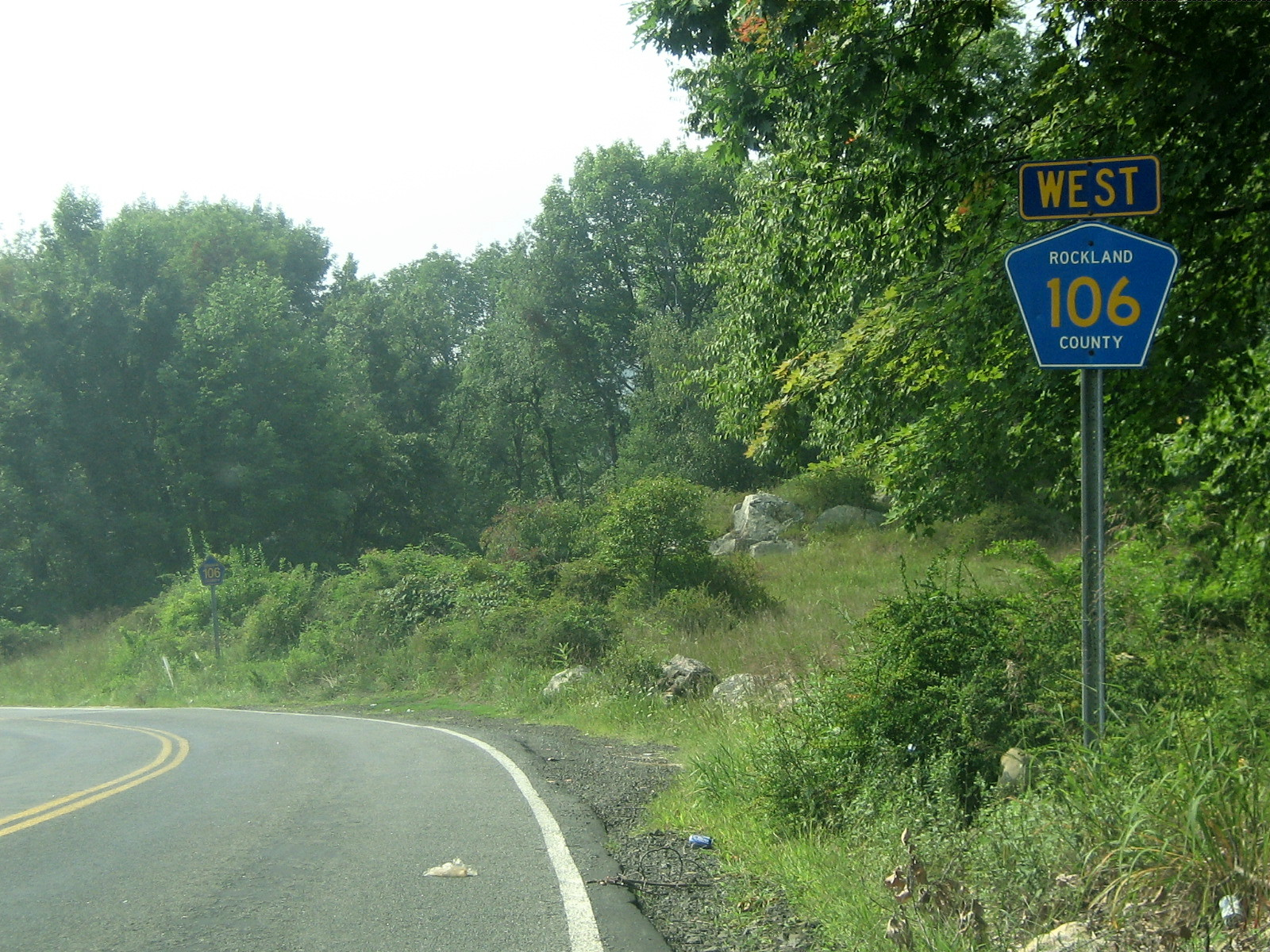
CR 106's western terminus at the Rockland/Orange County line.

CR 106 proceeds east from here where it then intersects Lake Welch Parkway, a seasonal road which provides a route to Lake Welch Beach and Palisades Interstate Parkway South. Then, CR 106 cross Lake Welch on a causeway over the southern side of the lake. CR 106 then begins its trek out of Harriman State Park and into the town of Stony Point.

Immediately after entering Stony Point, CR 106 intersects CR 98 where CR 106 makes a left turn. CR 106 then proceeds east toward its intersection with the Palisades Parkway at Exit 15 and the last residential exit northbound on the PIP, with everything north of this point being exits within Harriman and Bear Mountain.

Just after its intersection with the PIP, the road intersects former Rockland County Route CR 106A At this point CR 106 becomes a 45-mile-per-hour (72 km/h) highway with turning lanes. The highway intersects CR 108, CR 47, and CR 33 as Central Drive. CR 106 comes to an end shortly after these intersections at US 9W and US 202 in downtown Stony Point, about a mile west from the Hudson River and the Stony Point Marina.

== History ==
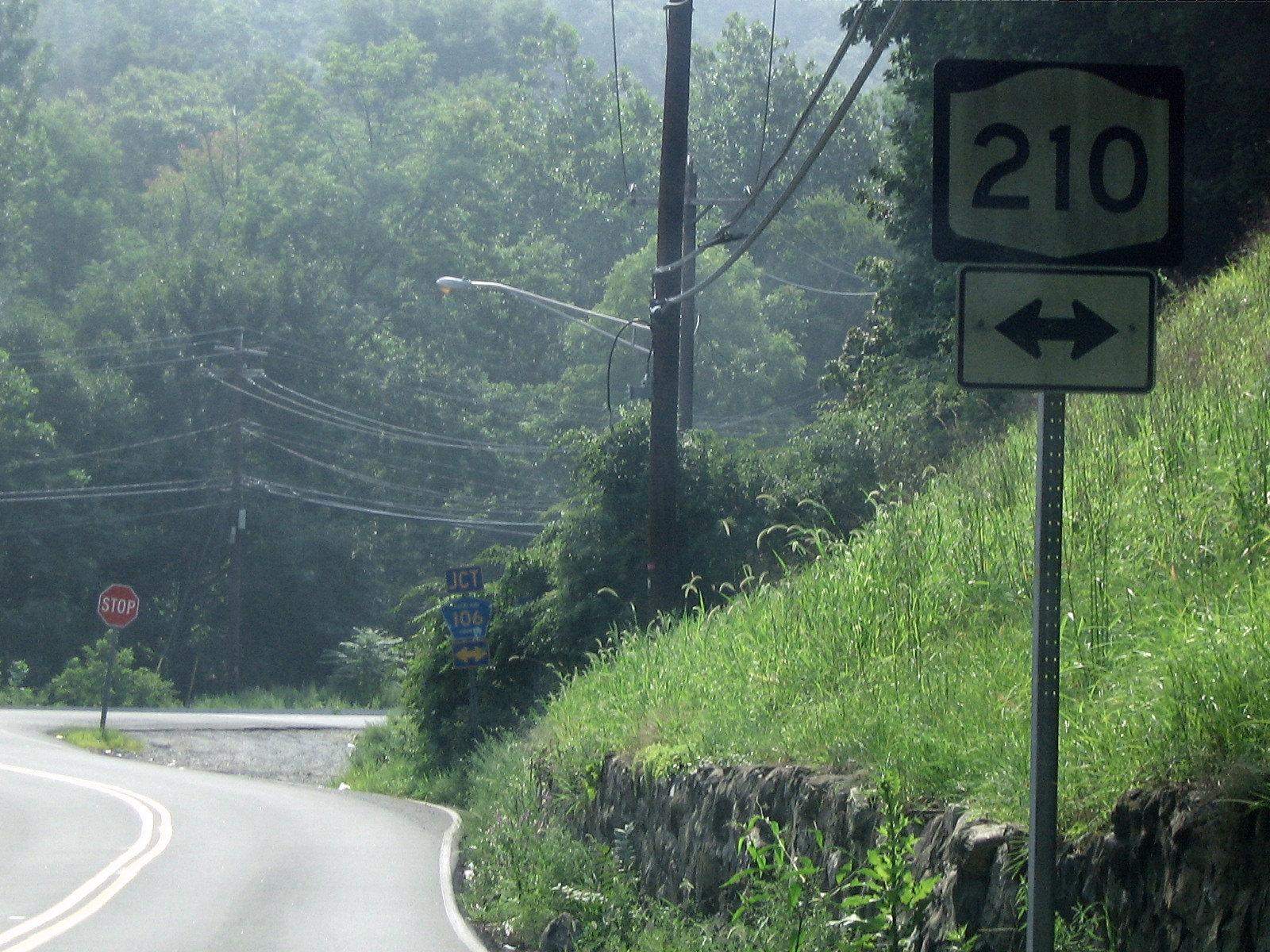
A few NY 210 shields still stand in Rockland County on side roads approaching CR 106.

CR 106 originated in 1824, when the road was chartered for the New Turnpike and headed from Monroe to Haverstraw. Back in the 1820s, what is now Southfields was known as Monroe. The New Turnpike started at a nail factory in Monroe to a crossing over the Ramapo River, and progressed eastward, passing Lake Stahahe (then known as Car Pond). The turnpike continued eastward, meeting the Old Turnpike at a fork in the road. At the fork, part of the road became NY 210 in the 1930 New York State Route renumbering. In 1910, when the park opened, the road became known as the Southfields Road. Three years later, it became part of the Seven Lakes Drive. Three more years later, the route became known as County Highway 416. In 1919 and 1920, the western section of the road was reconstructed. After a bridge was built to cross a river in 1923, a new route, making up part of the original Warwick Turnpike, became NY 17A.

The responsibility for maintaining NY 210 was turned over to the county in 1982. The road was replaced with CR 106. CR 106, which was both in Orange and Rockland counties, had its Orange County segment decommissioned on January 1, 2014 when they traded maintenance to the Palisades Interstate Park Commission.

== CR 106A ==
CR 106A was a 0.1-mile (0.16 km) spur which began at CR 106 and ended at a dead end near CR 69 in Stony Point.

== Major intersections ==
Location	mi	km	Destinations	Notes
Harriman State Park	0.00	0.00	Kanawauke Road	Continuation into Orange County; former CR 106
Harriman State Park	1.30	2.09	To Lake Welch Parkway / Seven Lakes Drive – Lake Welch Beach, Lake Sebago	Access via St. Johns Road; Lake Welch Parkway signed as Lake Welch Drive
Town of Stony Point	3.40	5.47	CR 98 east	Western terminus of CR 98
Town of Stony Point	3.50	5.63	CR 98A east	Western terminus of CR 98A
Town of Stony Point	4.30	6.92	CR 83 south	Northern terminus of CR 83
Harriman State Park	4.90	7.89	Palisades Parkway	Exit 15 on Palisades Parkway
Town of Stony Point	5.70	9.17	Cedar Flats Road (CR 69 north)	
Town of Stony Point	6.40	10.30	CR 108 east	Western terminus of CR 108
Town of Stony Point	6.80	10.94	CR 47	
Town of Stony Point	7.50	12.07	CR 33 south (Central Highway)	Northern terminus of CR 33
Town of Stony Point	7.8	12.6	US 9W / US 202	Eastern terminus
1.000 mi = 1.609 km; 1.000 km = 0.621 mi

== See also ==
- County Route 106 (Orange County, New York)
- List of county routes in Rockland County, New York (76–118A)
