= Sandyfield, New York =

Unincorporated community in New York, United States

Coordinates: 41°13′56″N 74°04′41″W

Sandyfield was a settlement of about 30 houses in the Town of Ramapo in Rockland County, New York, United States, that was submerged in 1928 when swampy Beaver Pond was dammed to create Lake Welch in Harriman State Park.

== Settlement History (1760-1939) ==
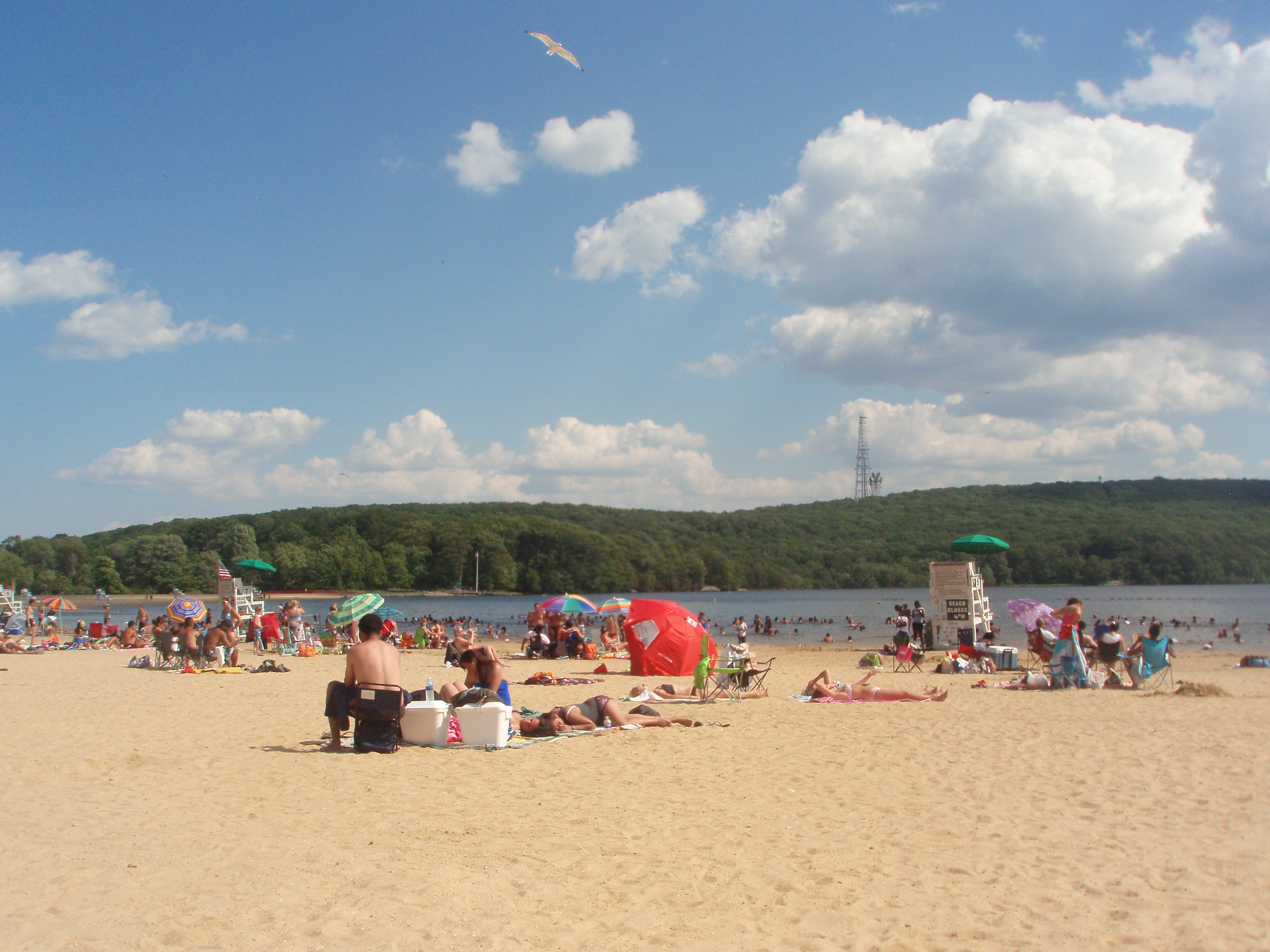
Beach at Lake Welch

The hamlet was settled in about 1760 along the road from Stony Point to Central Valley. The road is now a hiking trail called the Hasenclever Road.

In 1910, when Harriman State Park was created, the Palisades Interstate Park Commission notified residents that they would have to leave their homes. The park's plans included the creation of a 216-acre (0.87 km^{2}) lake, Lake Welch, by erecting a dam at Beaver Pond and submerging the area. There was an attempt to resist through political channels, but in 1939 the last residents were ordered to leave.

By 1942, the lake was completed using workers from the Civilian Conservation Corps that was building the park. The new lake was named in honor of William A. Welch the first chairman of the Palisades Interstate Park Commission, who was responsible for the creation of Harriman State Park.

== Lake Welch (1942-present) ==
After completion of the lake dam, Lake Welch Beach opened to the public. Featuring a half-mile beach walk and 2,500 space parking lots, the beach is the largest in the Palisades Region with almost a half million visitors in 2020. Every winter, the lake is drained about 20 feet to reclaim sand lost to the water.

The beach can be accessed from Exit 16 on the Palisades Interstate Parkway via Lake Welch Drive (closed winters) or County Route 106.

Adjacent to the lake is Beaver Pond Campground, one of two state-run overnight areas in the park. There are over 100 platform/ground camping sites with facilities but no connections for RVs.

== Sources ==
- Myles, William J., Harriman Trails, A Guide and History, New York-New Jersey Trail Conference, New York, N.Y., 1999.
