= Palisades Interstate Park Commission =

Park and commission in New Jersey and New York, US

- Palisades Interstate Park
- U.S. National Register of Historic Places
- U.S. National Historic Landmark
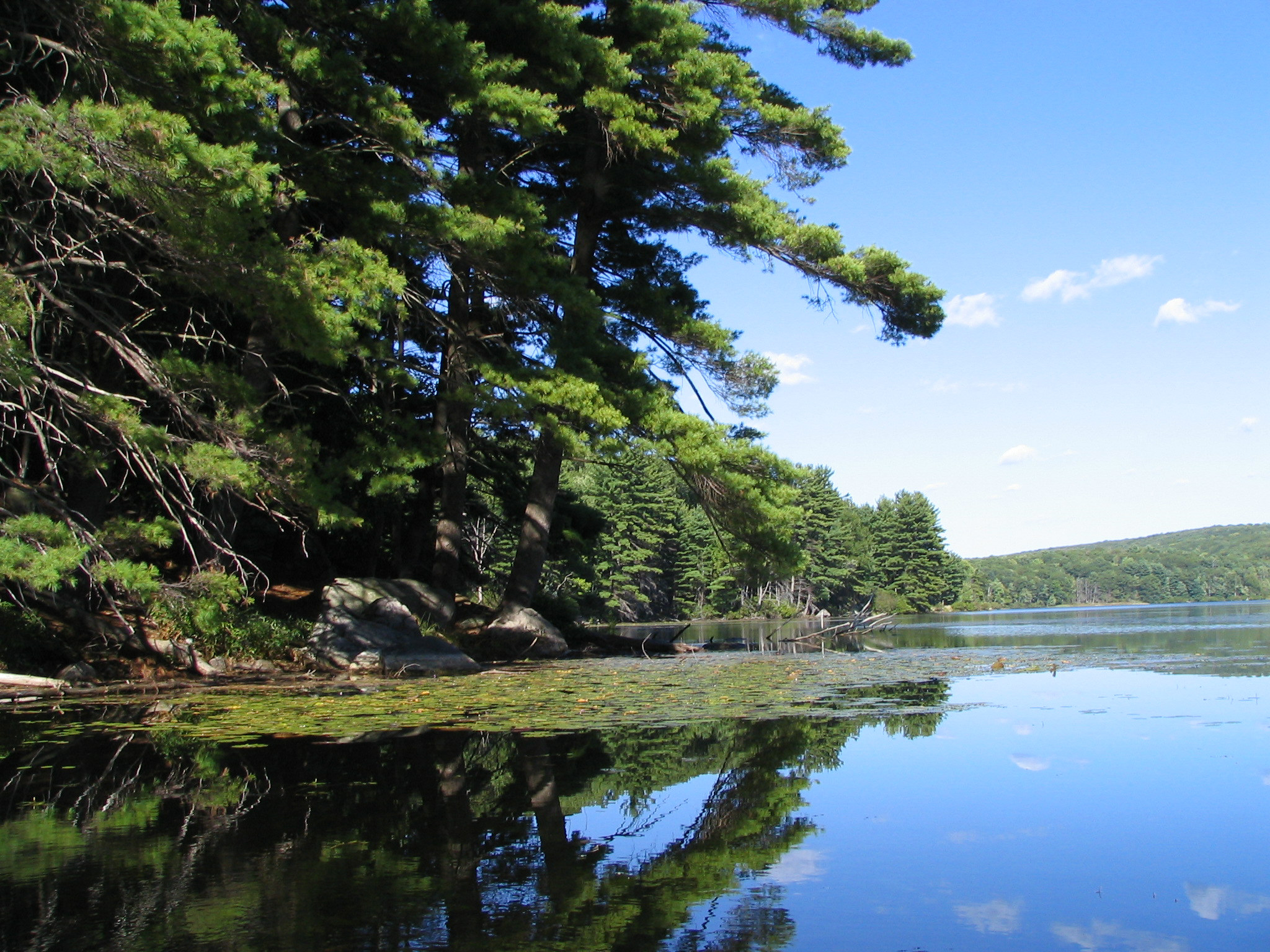
- Lake Kanawauke in Harriman State Park
- Location: Fort Lee, New Jersey northward to Palisades, New York
- Built: 1900
- NRHP reference No.: 66000890

Significant dates
- Added to NRHP: October 15, 1966
- Designated NHL: January 12, 1965

The Palisades Interstate Park Commission (PIPC) was formed in 1900 by Governors Theodore Roosevelt of New York and Foster Voorhees of New Jersey in response to the quarrying operations along the Palisades Cliffs of New Jersey. The Palisades, a National Natural Landmark that are also called the New Jersey Palisades or the Hudson River Palisades, are a line of cliffs along the west side of the lower Hudson River in Northeastern New Jersey and Southeastern New York in the United States. After its formation, the PIPC quickly moved to acquire the lands at the base of the Palisades to stop quarrying operations in both New York and New Jersey. The commission consists of ten commissioners, five appointed by each governor, and was ratified by an Act of Congress in 1937 when its interstate compact was approved. Today, the commission owns and operates more than 125,000 acres of public parkland in New York and New Jersey, including 21 state parks, 8 historic sites, and the Palisades Interstate Parkway. These parks attract more than 7 million visitors annually.

== History ==
In the late 1800s, quarry operations dotted the base of the Palisades Cliffs along the western shore of the Hudson River. These quarry operations sought the durable diabase rock that forms the Palisades to fuel the construction boom in nearby New York City. However, many residents of the area, including J.P. Morgan, saw the quarrying as the destruction of a valuable natural feature. There were many efforts to save the Palisades Cliffs, but the one that took root was led by the New Jersey State Federation of Women's Clubs. This group of influential women gathered together to lobby then-Governors Theodore Roosevelt and Foster Voorhees to save the cliffs. Their work culminated in the creation of the Palisades Interstate Park Commission, which was given the power to condemn and/or purchase land to protect the Palisades and create a public park.

Under the leadership of George W. Perkins, the commission began to purchase, condemn, and shut down quarry operations along the base of the cliffs. The commission worked quickly to preserve the land along the Hudson River between Fort Lee and the NY border. They then moved to Tallman Mountain in New York State, where quarrying was also taking place. Within a decade, the quarries were mostly closed down, and the Palisades Interstate Park was opened.

At the same time, the commission was working to expand public open space in Rockland and Orange Counties, NY. At Bear Mountain, a gift of 10,000 acres and $1,000,000 by Mary W. Harriman led to the establishment of Bear Mountain and Harriman State Parks. Today, Bear Mountain receives over 2 million annual visitors, and Harriman is the second-largest state park in New York. These parks, and their development, served as models for the National Park System, are the location of the first section of the Appalachian Trail established, and host some of the first nature trails and environmental education programs in the nation.

Upon the creation of the New York State Office of Parks, Recreation, and Historic Preservation (OPRHP) in 1970, the Palisades Interstate Park Commission was given the authority to manage the Palisades Region of NY State Parks. Today, PIPC and OPRHP jointly manage the 125,000 acres of parkland in this region, which includes all state parklands in Rockland, Orange, Ulster, and Sullivan Counties, New York. The Palisades Interstate Park was designated a National Historic Landmark in 1965. The designated area includes the Palisades Park in New Jersey, the Palisades Park in New York State, and the Tallman Mountain State Park in New York State.

== Major Welch ==
In 1913, George Perkins hired Major William A. Welch as assistant engineer. He would later become Chief Engineer, working to implement Perkins' plans for the park and, upon Perkins' death in 1920, became the General Manager of the Palisades Interstate Park system. He held this position until he died in 1940.

Under Welch's leadership, the Palisades Interstate Park grew exponentially, incorporating lands into what is now Harriman and Bear Mountain State Parks as well as at Blauvelt, Tallman Mountain, Nyack Beach, High Tor, and other parks in Rockland and Orange Counties.

When work started on the park, there were no models or precedents for an endeavor of its nature and scope. Welch organized a massive reforestation program, managed ten thousand Works Progress Administration and Civilian Conservation Corps workers, built twenty-three new lakes, 100 miles (160 km) of scenic drives, and one hundred and three children's camps, where 65,000 urban children enjoyed the outdoors each summer. He helped found the Palisades Interstate Park Trail Conference, which later became the New York–New Jersey Trail Conference, and he served as chairman of the Appalachian Trail Conference.

== Palisades Interstate Parkway ==
In 1933–34, the first thoughts of a Palisades Interstate Parkway were developed by engineer and environmentalist William A. Welch, who was general manager and chief engineer of the Palisades Interstate Park Commission. The plan was to build a parkway to connect the New Jersey Palisades with the state parks along the Hudson River in Rockland and Orange counties. Welch would soon garner the support of John D. Rockefeller, who donated 700 acres (2.8 km^{2}) of land along the New Jersey Palisades overlooking the Hudson River in 1933. With this favorable momentum for the new route, the proposed route was accepted as a Civil Works Administration project under Franklin D. Roosevelt's New Deal coalition. However, the New Jersey Highway Commission did not support construction, so the idea of a parkway was put on hold.

During the 1940s, Rockefeller renewed the push for a parkway along the New Jersey Palisades and teamed with the ultimate PIP planner, Robert Moses, to establish and design the parkway. The plan originally was to have the PIP stretch from the Garden State Parkway, along the Hudson River, to the George Washington Bridge, and then north along its present-day route ending at the Bear Mountain Bridge. This southern extension was never built, but construction began on the current PIP in New York on April 1, 1947. Construction on the New Jersey portion began about one year later. Construction was delayed twice due to material shortages, but the PIP was still opened in stages during the 1940s and 1950s. The route was completed in New Jersey in 1957, and on August 28, 1958, the final piece of the PIP was completed between exits 5 and 9 in southern Rockland County.

== Henry Hudson Drive ==
Henry Hudson Drive is a small scenic roadway in Bergen County, New Jersey, that runs for 8 miles (13 km) along the western side of the Hudson River from Edgewater, New Jersey, to Alpine, New Jersey. The road is located at the bottom of the Palisades Cliffs close to the river. Built and maintained by the Palisades Interstate Park Commission, it is a predecessor to the Palisades Interstate Parkway, located to the west of it, and while the parkway has very much superseded it, the Drive is still open and used as a scenic road for New York City, Yonkers, and Washington Heights across the river. The Drive connects many picnic areas and docks to the main roads, and it also goes under the George Washington Bridge, the only road in New Jersey to do so.

== Current scope ==
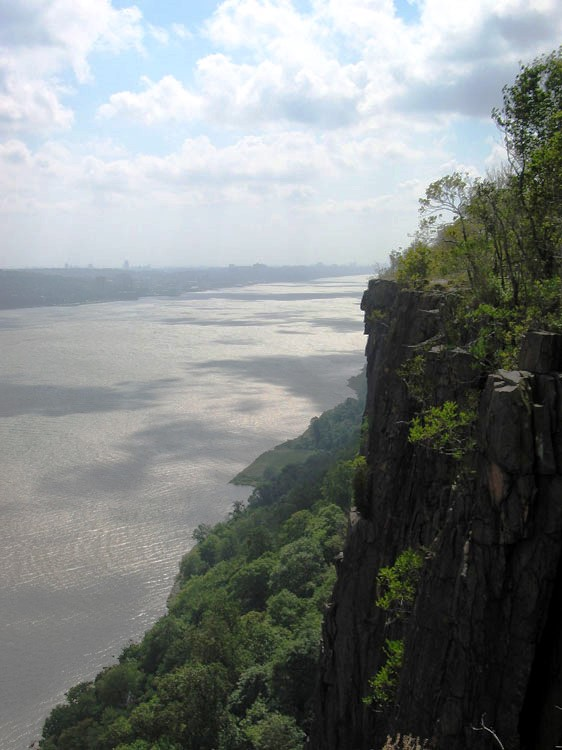
The cliffs of the New Jersey Palisades in Bergen (seen here) and Hudson counties overlook the Hudson River.

The park system has been expanded over the years to include nineteen state parks and nine historic sites, covering over 100,000 acres (400 km^{2}) along more than 20 miles (32 km) of Hudson River shoreline and beyond. The commission also oversees and operates the Palisades Interstate Parkway, built between 1947 and 1958. The commission also owns four additional parkways that traverse its parks. However, two are partially or wholly maintained by the New York State Department of Transportation, while the rest are both owned and maintained by PIPC.

The Palisades Interstate Park in New Jersey is about 12 miles long and half a mile wide at its widest point; the average width of the facility is about 575 yards. It covers 2,500 acres (3.9 sq. mi.). The park contains uplands, cliffs, and the Hudson River shorefront. PIP has more than 30 miles of hiking and ski trails.

=== State parks ===
- Bear Mountain State Park, NY
- Blauvelt State Park, NY
- Bristol Beach State Park, NY
- Franny Reese State Park, NY
- Goosepond Mountain State Park, NY
- Harriman State Park, NY
- Haverstraw Beach State Park, NY
- High Tor State Park, NY
- Highland Lakes State Park, NY
- Hook Mountain State Park, NY
- Lake Superior State Park, NY
- Minnewaska State Park Preserve, NY
- Nyack Beach State Park, NY
- Palisades Interstate Park, NJ
- Rockland Lake State Park, NY
- Schunnemunk State Park, NY
- Sterling Forest State Park, NY
- Storm King State Park, NY
- Tallman Mountain State Park, NY

=== Historic sites ===
- Blackledge-Kearney House, NJ
- Fort Lee Historic Park, NJ
- Fort Montgomery State Historic Site, NY
- Knox's Headquarters State Historic Site, NY
- New Windsor Cantonment State Historic Site, NY
- Senate House State Historic Site, NY
- Stony Point Battlefield State Historic Site, NY
- National Purple Heart Hall of Honor, NY
- Washington's Headquarters State Historic Site, NY

=== Parkways ===
- Arden Valley Road
- Lake Welch Parkway (ownership)
- Palisades Parkway
- Seven Lakes Drive (partial ownership)
- Tiorati Brook Road

== See also ==
- Palisades Interstate Parkway Police Department
