= New York State Route 59 =

State highway in Rockland County, New York, US

New York State Route 59
- Korean War Veterans Memorial Highway
- Map of Rockland County in southeastern New York with NY 59 highlighted in red

Route information
- Maintained by NYSDOT
- Length: 14.08 mi (22.66 km)
- Existed: late 1920s–present

Major junctions
- West end: I-87 / New York Thruway / NY 17 in Ramapo
- US 202 in Suffern; I-87 / I-287 / New York Thruway / CR 35A in Nanuet; NY 304 in Nanuet; Palisades Parkway in West Nyack; NY 303 in Central Nyack; I-87 Toll / I-287 Toll / New York Thruway in Nyack
- East end: I-87 / I-287 / New York Thruway / US 9W in Nyack

Location
- Country: United States
- State: New York
- Counties: Rockland

Highway system
- New York Highways; Interstate; US; State; Reference; Parkways
← NY 58	→ NY 60

New York State Route 59 (NY 59) is an east–west state highway in southern Rockland County, New York, in the United States. The route extends for 14.08 miles (22.66 km) from NY 17 in Hillburn to U.S. Route 9W (US 9W) in Nyack. In Suffern, it has a concurrency with US 202 for 0.05 miles (0.08 km). NY 59 runs parallel to the New York State Thruway its entire route. The routing of NY 59 became a state highway in 1911 and was signed as NY 59 in the late 1920s.

When NY 59 was first assigned, it began at NY 17 in Suffern. A western bypass of Suffern was designated as New York State Route 339 c. 1932; however, it became part of a realigned NY 17 in the mid-1930s. NY 339 was reassigned to NY 17's former routing between Hillburn and Suffern, but it was replaced again c. 1937 by an extended NY 59. In the 1960s, proposals surfaced for the Spring Valley Bypass, a highway that would utilize the NY 59 corridor between NY 306 in Monsey and NY 45 in Spring Valley. The proposed highway was never built.

== Route description ==
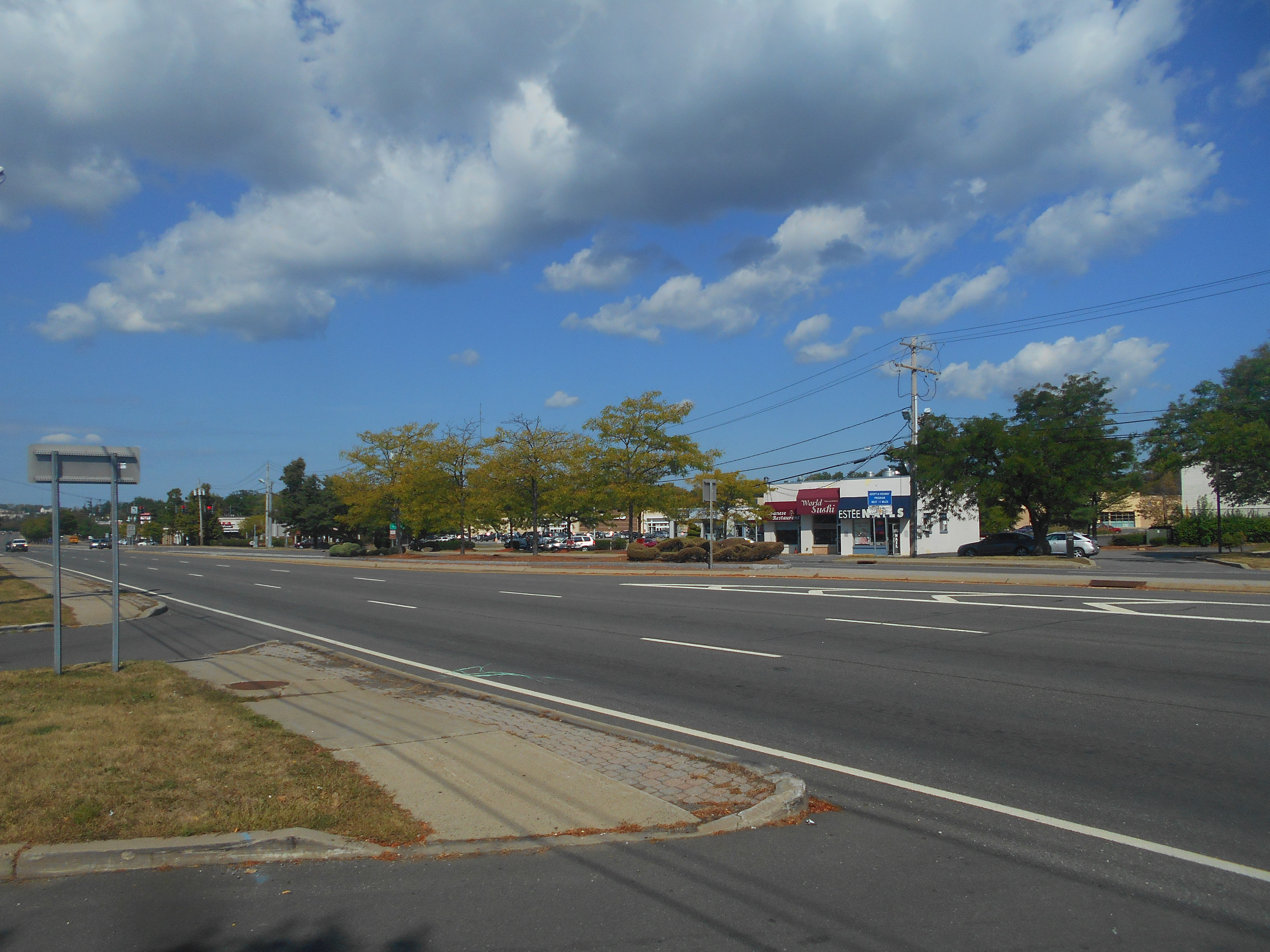
NY 59 westbound through Nanuet, after the interchange with NY 304

NY 59 begins at an intersection with NY 17 in Hillburn, just south of the village of Sloatsburg in southern Rockland County. It heads to the southeast as the Korean War Veterans Memorial Highway, crossing over the Ramapo River and the Metro-North Railroad's Port Jervis Line before following both into Suffern. The river leaves NY 59 just inside the village line; however, the railroad continues to run alongside NY 59 into the center of Suffern, where both pass under the New York State Thruway near where Interstate 87 (I-87) connects to I-287.

Just south of the I-87 overpass, NY 59 meets US 202 at Wayne Avenue. US 202 joins NY 59 for a one block wrong way concurrency along Orange Avenue—as NY 59 eastbound is paired with US 202 westbound and vice versa—during which time both routes cross a Norfolk Southern Railway line at-grade. At the end of the overlap, US 202 continues south along Orange Avenue to the New Jersey state line while NY 59 forks eastward toward central Rockland County. As NY 59 leaves Suffern and enters Airmont, it passes Good Samaritan Hospital, a major hospital in Rockland County. While in Airmont, NY 59 intersects County Route 89 (CR 89) and CR 85. After leaving Airmont, NY 59 proceeds east through Monsey, where it intersects the southern terminus of NY 306.

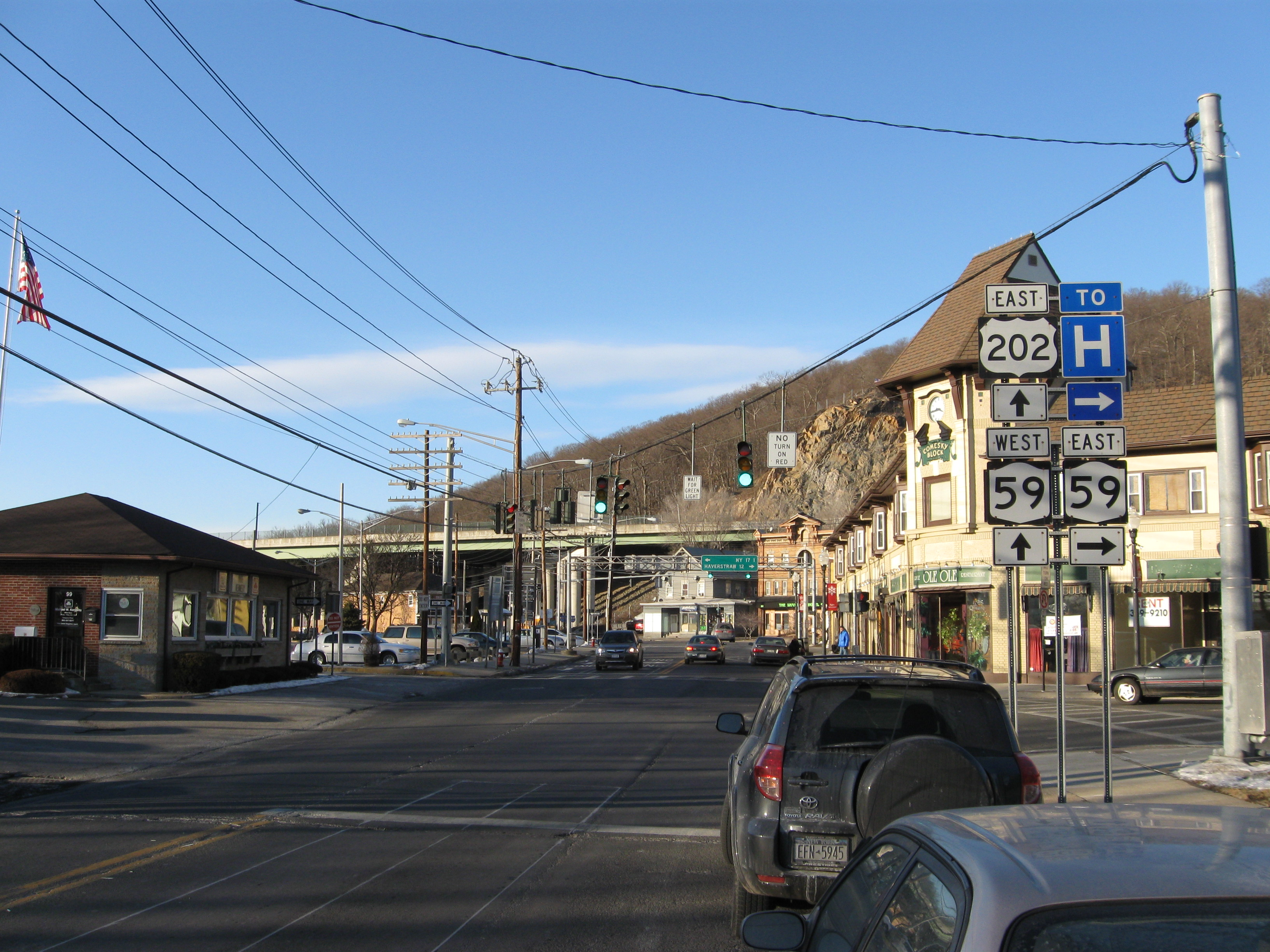
NY 59's brief wrong-way concurrency with US 202 in Suffern.

As NY 59 passes Spring Valley High School, it enters the village limits of Spring Valley. While in Spring Valley, NY 59 has an overlap with CR 35A for about a tenth of a mile and meets the Thruway at exit 14, with a pair of park and ride lots located at the interchange. The route continues eastward into Nanuet, where NY 59 passes through a heavy commercialized area, crossing under NJ Transit/Metro-North Railroad's Pascack Valley Line. Before its busy intersection with CR 33, NY 59 passes The Shops at Nanuet to its south and the Rockland Plaza to its north.

Upon entering West Nyack, NY 59 becomes a four-lane expressway and intersects NY 304 and the Palisades Interstate Parkway (exit 8). The route proceeds onward, passing Palisades Center, one of the largest shopping malls in the country. Immediately after passing Palisades Center, NY 59 becomes a four-lane surface road and briefly enters Central Nyack. Here it connects to NY 303 by way of an interchange. Before hitting the Nyack village line, NY 59 has its final interchange with the Thruway. The southbound entrance to the Tappan Zee Bridge is via Mountainview Avenue, and the northbound entrance is via Polhemus Street.

At the Nyack line, NY 59 becomes known as Main Street. As Main Street, NY 59 runs under the Thruway one final time before the Thruway heads over the bridge. The route continues toward downtown Nyack; however, it ends at an intersection with US 9W before it reaches the central district. Main Street continues for several blocks into downtown Nyack.

== History ==
=== Origins ===
NY 59 originated as the Nyack Turnpike, which was the first major thoroughfare in Rockland County. A petition was filed in 1813 to construct the turnpike. Legislation stemming from the petition was passed on April 17, 1816, allowing construction to begin. The Nyack Turnpike was completed from Suffern to Nyack in the 1830s, despite many years of local opposition to the highway. Its charter was renewed multiple times throughout the 19th century, and it was designated as a toll road to help pay for its upkeep. In 1894, the turnpike was absorbed into the Rockland County road system.

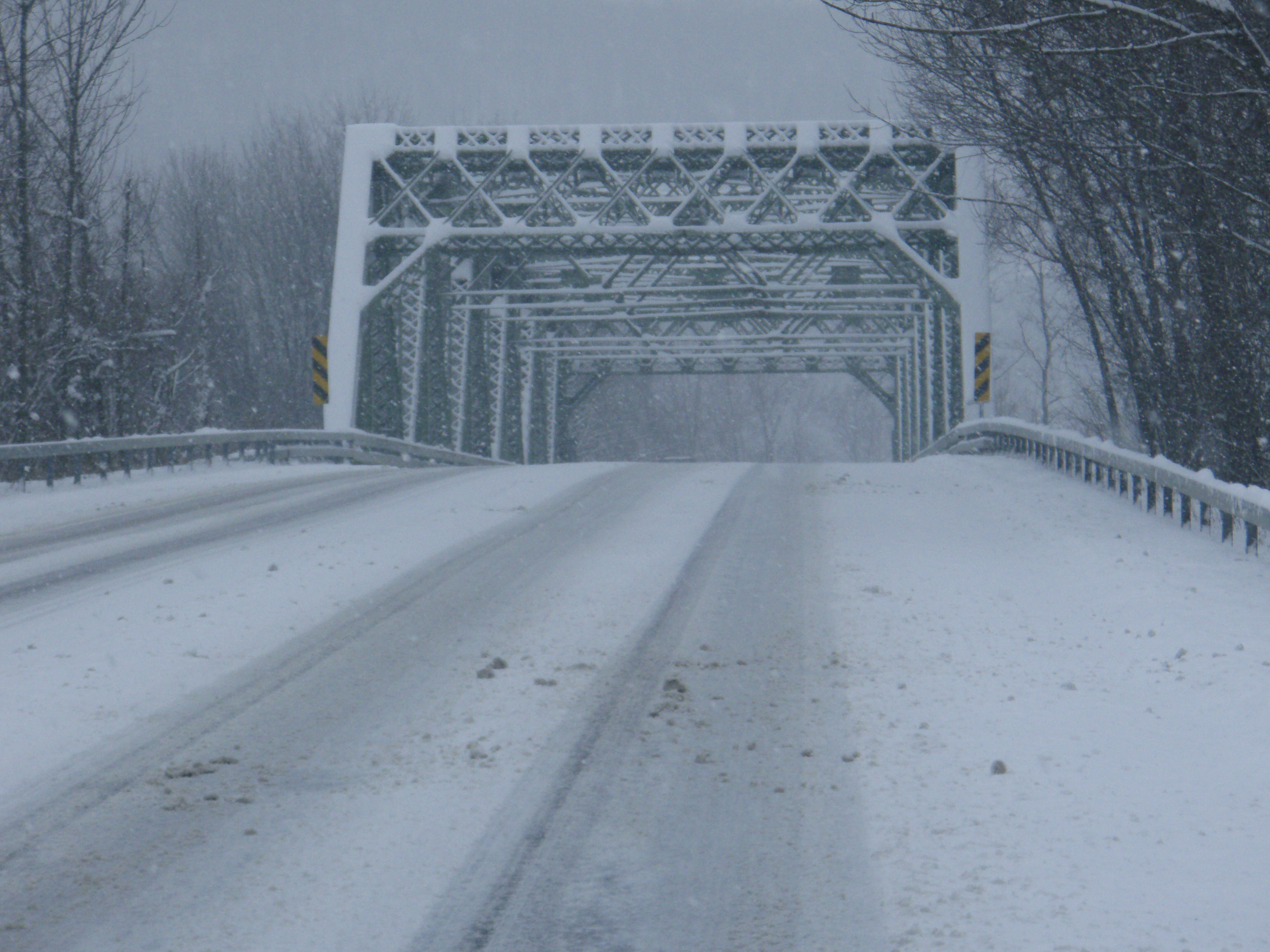
The bridge carrying NY 59 over the Norfolk Southern Railway near its western terminus in Hillburn on a snowy day.

The turnpike was turned over from the county to the state of New York on July 14, 1911, and added to the state highway system as part of Route 39-b, an unsigned legislative route extending from Nyack (at Broadway) to Harriman via modern NY 59 and NY 17. The Route 39-b designation was eliminated on March 1, 1921, as part of a partial renumbering of New York's legislative route system. When the first set of posted routes in New York were assigned in 1924, the portion of former Route 39-b between Suffern and Harriman became part of NY 17. The remainder of the route from Nyack to Suffern was not given a number.

=== Designation ===
The Suffern–Nyack highway remained unnumbered until the late 1920s when was designated as NY 59. At the time, NY 59 was routed on West Nyack Road between Nanuet and Central Nyack. The route was rendered unchanged in the 1930 renumbering of state highways in New York. A western bypass of Suffern was designated as NY 339 c. 1932. The north–south highway left NY 17 at the hamlet of Ramapo and followed the modern New York State Thruway and I-287 corridors south through Hillburn to the New Jersey state line. In the mid-1930s, the alignments of NY 17 and NY 339 south of Ramapo were swapped, placing NY 17 on the bypass and NY 339 on the Ramapo–Suffern route. In Suffern, NY 339 ended at a junction with US 202 just one block north of NY 59's western terminus. NY 339 was replaced by an extended NY 59 c. 1937.

New York State Route 59A
- Location: West Nyack
- Existed: February 1956–late 1950s

In the early 1950s, construction began on a bypass of West Nyack Road between Nanuet and West Nyack. The highway was completed c. 1955 and became part of a realigned NY 59. The portion of NY 59's former routing that did not overlap NY 304 was redesignated as NY 59A in February 1956. This designation was short-lived as it was removed from West Nyack Road in the late 1950s. A local company carried out work to convert the highway into a shopping center access road; however, Rockland County asserted that the town—and by extension the company—had no rights to perform this action. The county sued the company that helped improve the highway in 2002.

=== Traffic problems ===
In 1958, Ramapo town engineer Edwin Wallace noticed an increase in the amount of traffic passing through the village of Spring Valley, which had become the largest village in Rockland County by this time. This led Wallace to propose a 5-mile (8.0 km) bypass of NY 59 in Monsey and NY 45 in Hillcrest. Rockland County approved the proposed bypass two years later. In 1966, the Tri-State Transportation Commission released its long-term highway report for the area. The new study replaced the Spring Valley Bypass with the NY 45 expressway, a north–south bypass of Spring Valley connecting the Garden State Parkway to the Palisades Interstate Parkway. The road would serve a steadily growing area of commercial businesses along the NY 45 corridor. No action was taken on this proposal.

With the Spring Valley Bypass plan shelved, traffic continued to pour through the Spring Valley–Nanuet area. In 1987, a task force was introduced to come up with a plan to solve this issue. Traffic became even worse when the Nanuet Mall expanded in 1994. NYSDOT tried to fix the worsening situation in 1995 when they reconstructed almost 3 miles (5 km) of NY 59 from the eastern border of Spring Valley to exit 8 of the Palisades Interstate Parkway. The project widened the road to six lanes, helping to move traffic through the area from Grandview to Middletown Roads in Nanuet. In 1997, the New York State Thruway Authority dropped the Spring Valley toll on the Thruway for all motorists except truckers. This helped reduce traffic on NY 59 between exits 14A and 14B.

Shortly after the traffic problems in Nanuet were reduced, the focus was shifted to West Nyack where Palisades Center was being constructed. First proposed in the late 1980s, construction finally started in 1995. This caused major delays for motorists when a bridge was constructed from NY 59 to Palisades Center south parking lot. To keep this portion of NY 59 from being overloaded with mall goers, exit 12 of the Thruway with NY 303 was re-routed through Palisades Center via Palisades Center Drive.

In coordination with the Lower Hudson Transit Link, new traffic signals, with transit priority, were built on NY 59, along with new bus shelters, ADA-compliant sidewalks and crosswalks. Integrated Corridor Management systems and Intelligent Traffic Signal technology were also installed on NY 59 to decrease travel times for Hudson Link buses going to and from New York City.

== Future ==
The New York Metropolitan Transportation Council (NYMTC) has started the Route 59 Area Transportation & Land Use Study to study NY 59 between Airmont Road and the bridge over South Pascack Road. The study, taking place between Winter 2019 and Spring 2020, will investigate possible improvements to the road, such as new bicycle lanes and sidewalks.

== Major intersections ==
The entire route is in Rockland County.

Location	mi	km	Destinations	Notes
Ramapo	0.00	0.00	I-87 Toll north / New York Thruway north / NY 17 north – Albany, Sloatsburg, Tuxedo	Western terminus
Ramapo	0.20	0.32	I-87 south / New York Thruway south / NY 17 south to I-287 – Governor Mario M. Cuomo Bridge, New York City	Access via Old Route 17; exit 15A on I-87 / Thruway
Suffern	1.65	2.66	US 202 east – Haverstraw	Western end of US 202 concurrency
Suffern	1.70	2.74	US 202 west – Mahwah, NJ	Eastern end of US 202 concurrency
Airmont	3.87	6.23	CR 89 (Airmont Road) to I-87 / I-287 / New York Thruway	
Monsey	6.23	10.03	NY 306 north (Main Street) / CR 73 south (East Saddle River Road) – Pomona	Southern terminus of NY 306; northern terminus of CR 73
Spring Valley	7.57	12.18	NY 45 (South Main Street) – Mount Ivy, Montvale, NJ	
Spring Valley	8.34	13.42	CR 35A north (New Clarkstown Road)	Western end of CR 35A concurrency
Nanuet	8.43– 8.82	13.57– 14.19	I-87 / I-287 / New York Thruway / CR 35A south (Forman Drive) to G.S. Parkway south	Eastern end of CR 35A concurrency; exit 14 on I-87 / I-287 / Thruway
Nanuet	9.50	15.29	CR 33 (Middletown Road) – Nanuet Station	To The Shops at Nanuet
Nanuet	10.26	16.51	Western end of limited-access section	
Nanuet	10.26	16.51	NY 304 – New City, Pearl River	Modified cloverleaf interchange
West Nyack	10.68	17.19	Palisades Parkway – New York, Bear Mountain	Cloverleaf interchange; exits 8E-W on Palisades Parkway
West Nyack	11.73	18.88	CR 23 (Sickletown Road)	Eastbound entrance only
Central Nyack	12.39	19.94	Eastern end of limited-access section	
Central Nyack	12.81	20.62	NY 303 – Orangeburg, Haverstraw	Modified cloverleaf interchange
Nyack	13.67	22.00	I-87 Toll south / I-287 Toll east / New York Thruway south – Governor Mario M. Cuomo Bridge	Exit 11 on I-87 / I-287 / Thruway
Nyack	14.08	22.66	I-87 north / I-287 west / New York Thruway north / US 9W – Albany, Upper Nyack, Piermont	Eastern terminus; exit 11 on I-87 / I-287 / Thruway; access to I-87 via High Avenue
1.000 mi = 1.609 km; 1.000 km = 0.621 mi: Concurrency terminus; Incomplete access
