= New York State Route 304 =

State highway in Rockland County, New York, US

New York State Route 304
- Map of Rockland County in southeastern New York with NY 304 highlighted in red

Route information
- Maintained by NYSDOT
- Length: 10.38 mi (16.70 km)
- Existed: 1930–present

Major junctions
- South end: CR 503 at the New Jersey state line in Pearl River
- NY 59 in Nanuet
- North end: US 9W in Congers

Location
- Country: United States
- State: New York
- Counties: Rockland

Highway system
- New York Highways; Interstate; US; State; Reference; Parkways
← NY 303	→ NY 305

New York State Route 304 (NY 304), also known as "Rockland County Clerk Paul Piperato Memorial Highway", as well as Pearl Street for its first half a mile and Main Street for other parts, is a north–south state highway located in central Rockland County, New York, in the United States. The 10.38-mile (16.70 km) route begins at the New Jersey–New York border in Pearl River and ends at an intersection with U.S. Route 9W (US 9W) in the community of Congers. The route is a main route through Rockland County, intersecting NY 59 and indirectly connecting to the New York State Thruway and the Palisades Interstate Parkway (PIP) in Nanuet. NY 304 has three distinct sections: a freeway that extends from Pearl River to Nanuet, a surface section between Nanuet and New City, and an expressway linking New City to Haverstraw.

NY 304 was assigned in 1930, originally following a series of at-grade roads that loosely parallel its modern alignment between Pearl River and Haverstraw. Concerns over the route's ability to handle a projected 40,000 vehicles per day in 1980 led to the construction of new highways south of Nanuet and north of New City in the mid-1960s. Most of NY 304's old alignment through these areas is now maintained by Rockland County as part of several county routes.

== Route description ==
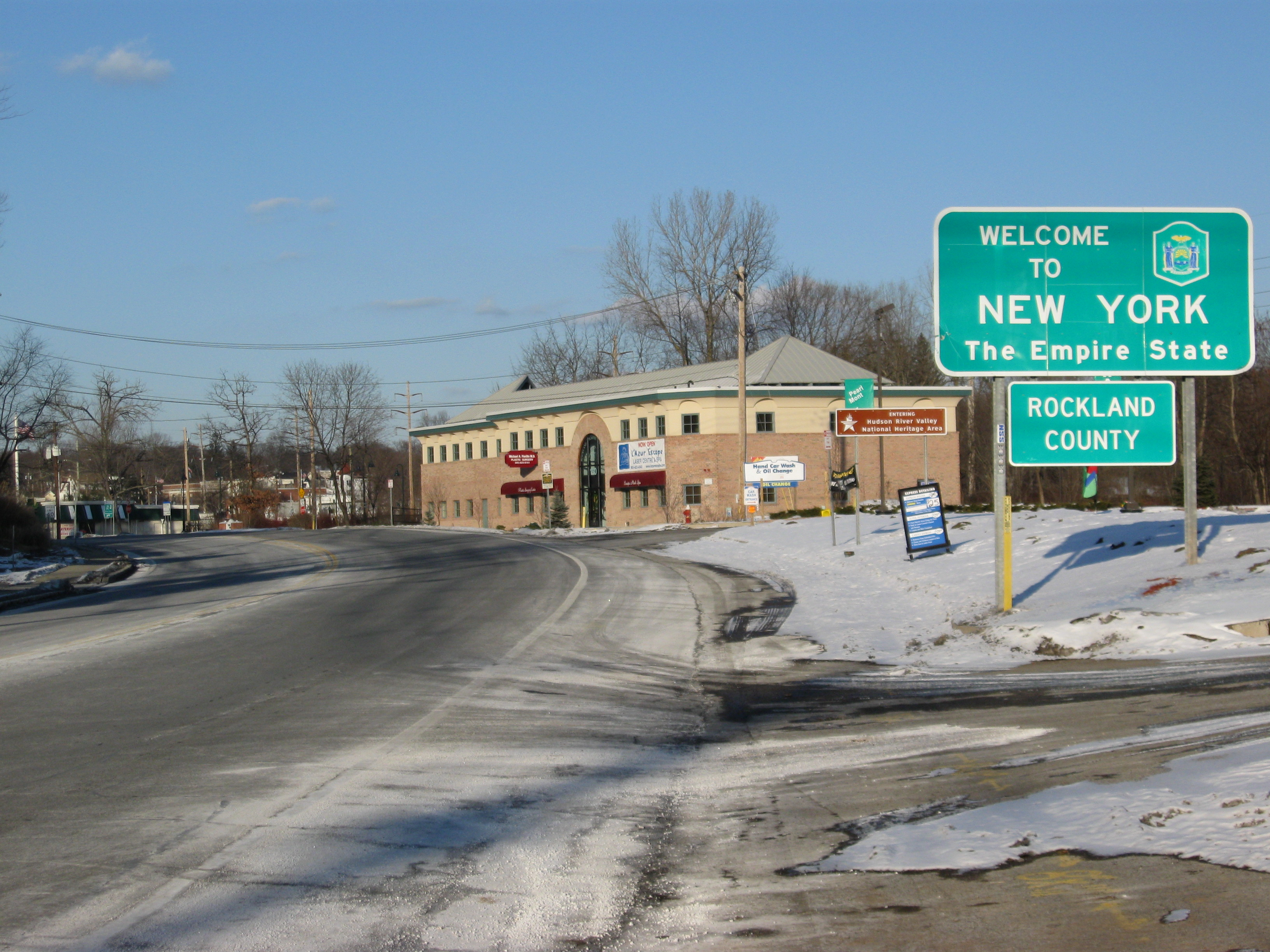
South end of NY 304 at the New Jersey–New York state line in Pearl River

NY 304 begins as a two-lane surface road at the New Jersey–New York border in Pearl River. South of the border is Montvale in Bergen County, in which NY 304 continues as County Route 503 (CR 503), known as Kinderkamack Road in Bergen County. From its southern terminus at the state border to its interchange with Washington Ave about a half a mile up, it is also known as Pearl Street. NY 304 quickly becomes a four-lane surface road intersecting CR 33 and CR 30 in Pearl River. CR 33 provides a link to the downtown business district of Pearl River via Central Avenue. After its intersection with CR 30, NY 304 becomes a four-lane freeway. The freeway has interchanges with Crooked Hill Road (northbound only) and CR 33 (Middletown Road) in Pearl River and NY 59 in Nanuet. The latter exit indirectly connects NY 304 with the PIP and the New York State Thruway (Interstate 87 or I-87 and I-287).

At its intersection with former NY 59A (West Nyack Road), NY 304 reverts to a four-lane surface road. Just north of West Nyack Road, NY 304 passes over the Thruway and the PIP, here less than 0.25 miles (0.40 km) apart. NY 304 does not connect to either of the highways; instead, the Thruway and the PIP connect to each other by way of a large cloverleaf interchange along the eastern side of NY 304. The route continues north, entering the hamlet of New City as the highway intersects CR 27 (Germonds Road). NY 304 provides a link to the downtown business district of New City at its intersection with Main Street one block to the north.

North of this location, NY 304 becomes a four-lane expressway. The road then becomes a two-lane expressway at a junction with CR 80. Finally, after crossing CR 23 in north New City, NY 304 makes its final push toward its northern terminus at an intersection with US 9W just inside the Haverstraw town line. The intersection between NY 304 and US 9W is less than one mile (1.6 km) north of the intersection of NY 303 and US 9W, which also serves as NY 303's northern terminus.

== History ==
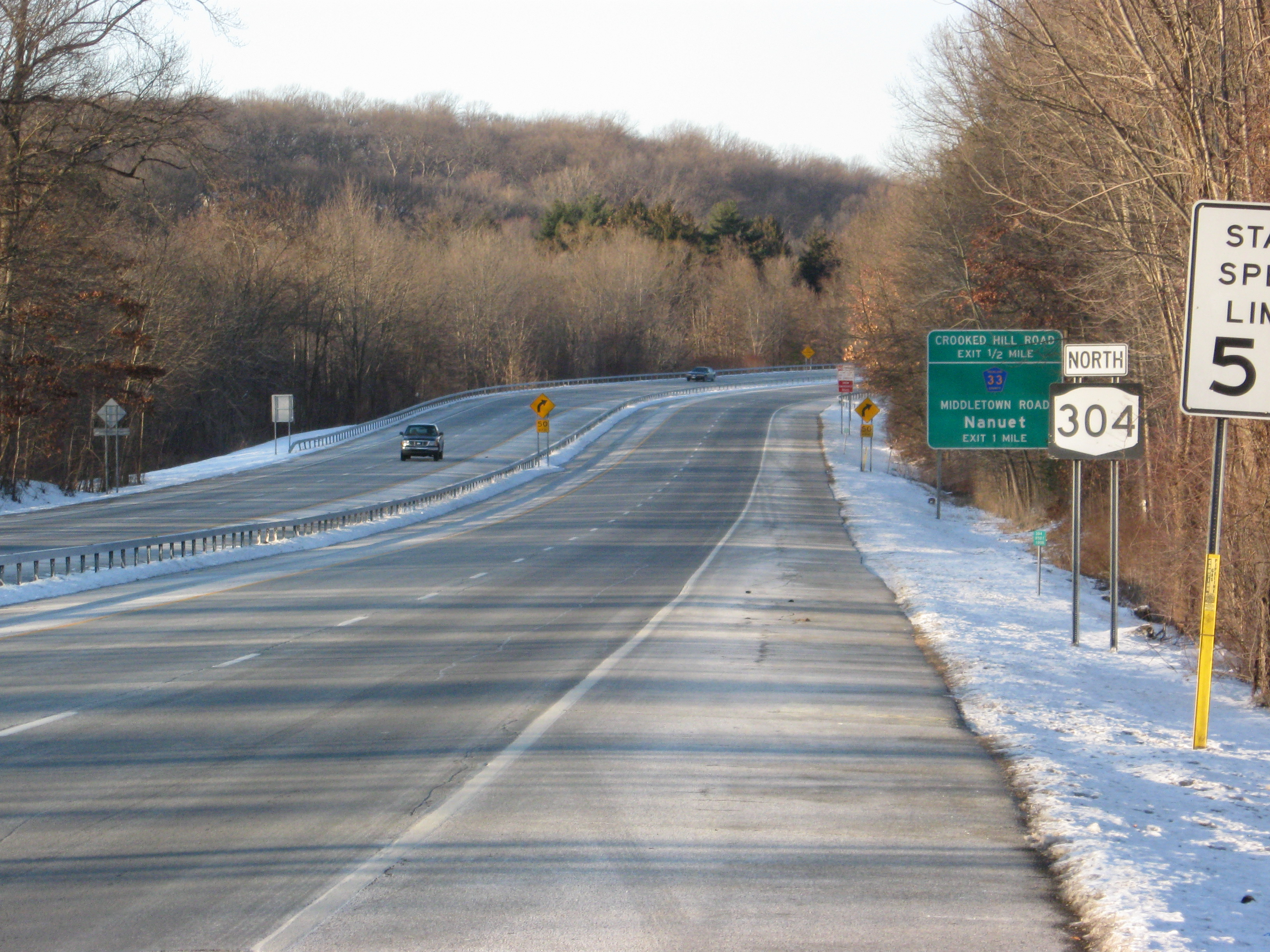
NY 304 northbound just north of Pearl River

NY 304 was assigned as part of the 1930 renumbering of state highways in New York. The route was originally an at-grade highway for its entire length, following what is now East Washington Avenue (CR 35), Middletown Road (CR 33) from Pearl River, and Main Street to West Nyack Road (then NY 59) in Nanuet. Here, NY 304 turned east, overlapping with NY 59 to access its current alignment. Farther north, NY 304 originally utilized North Main Street (CR 29) in New City and South Mountain (CR 90) roads from New City to US 202 in Garnerville. NY 304 was realigned slightly in the early 1940s to follow East Central Avenue in Pearl River and the overlap with NY 59 was eliminated in the mid-1950s when NY 59 was moved onto a new highway paralleling West Nyack Road to the south.

Street traffic forecasters for the Rockland County Planning Department predicted in 1960 that the section of the road between Pearl River and Nanuet would serve 30–40,000 vehicles per day in 1980. Since the road would not be able to sustain that amount, a new bypass between the two locations was opened in the mid-1960s as a realignment of NY 304. The bypass, which extended from Central Avenue in Pearl River to West Nyack Road in Nanuet, handles about 23,000 cars per day as of 2008. The Pearl River–Nanuet bypass was part of a larger plan to build a freeway extending from Pearl River to Haverstraw at Hook Mountain State Park; however, the section of the route north of Nanuet was cancelled as the county's 1980 traffic volume projection for the Nanuet–Haverstraw corridor was not high enough to justify the construction of a new highway.

Although the plans for a Nanuet–Haverstraw freeway were scrapped, NY 304 was ultimately moved onto a new, mostly at-grade highway between the two locations in the mid-1960s. The new alignment utilized the pre-existing Long Clove Road near the northern tip of DeForest Lake and a newly built road bypassing New City to the east and running generally northeasterly to the junction of Ridge and Long Clove roads. The northernmost part of NY 304 was realigned in the 1980s to follow a new highway paralleling Long Clove Road to the south.

== Notable casualties ==
- Frank Laskier, British author and war hero. Died in a car accident on 8 July 1949, aged 37, in the New City section. He was the passenger in a car driven by a young lady who left the road and plowed into a tree. She was unhurt. Laskier lived nearby on South Mountain Road.

== Major intersections ==
The entire route is in Rockland County.

Location	mi	km	Destinations	Notes
Pearl River	0.00	0.00	CR 503 south (Kinderkamack Road)	Continuation into New Jersey
Pearl River	0.46	0.74	CR 30 (West Central Avenue)	Southern end of freeway section
Pearl River	1.60	2.57	Crooked Hill Road	Northbound exit and entrance
Pearl River	1.88	3.03	CR 33 (Middletown Road) – Nanuet, Pearl River	
Nanuet	3.50	5.63	NY 59 – Nyack, Spring Valley	Modified cloverleaf interchange
Nanuet	3.80	6.12	Northern end of freeway section	
New City			Southern end of limited-access section	
New City	10.38	16.70	US 9W – Haverstraw, Congers, Nyack	Northern terminus; at-grade intersection
1.000 mi = 1.609 km; 1.000 km = 0.621 mi: Incomplete access
