= New York State Route 306 =

State highway in Rockland County, New York, US

New York State Route 306
- Map of the Lower Hudson Valley with NY 306 highlighted in red

Route information
- Maintained by NYSDOT
- Length: 5.33 mi (8.58 km)
- Existed: 1930–present

Major junctions
- South end: NY 59 / CR 73 in Ramapo
- North end: US 202 in Pomona

Location
- Country: United States
- State: New York
- Counties: Rockland

Highway system
- New York Highways; Interstate; US; State; Reference; Parkways
← NY 305	→ NY 307

New York State Route 306 (NY 306) is a north–south state highway in western Rockland County, New York, in the United States. NY 306 runs from NY 59 in the hamlet of Monsey to U.S. Route 202 (US 202) in Ladentown, on the western boundary of the village of Pomona. The road is currently 5.33 miles (8.58 km) long; however, it originally extended south to the New Jersey state line and north to Willow Grove Road (former NY 210) when it was assigned as part of the 1930 renumbering of state highways in New York.

== Route description ==
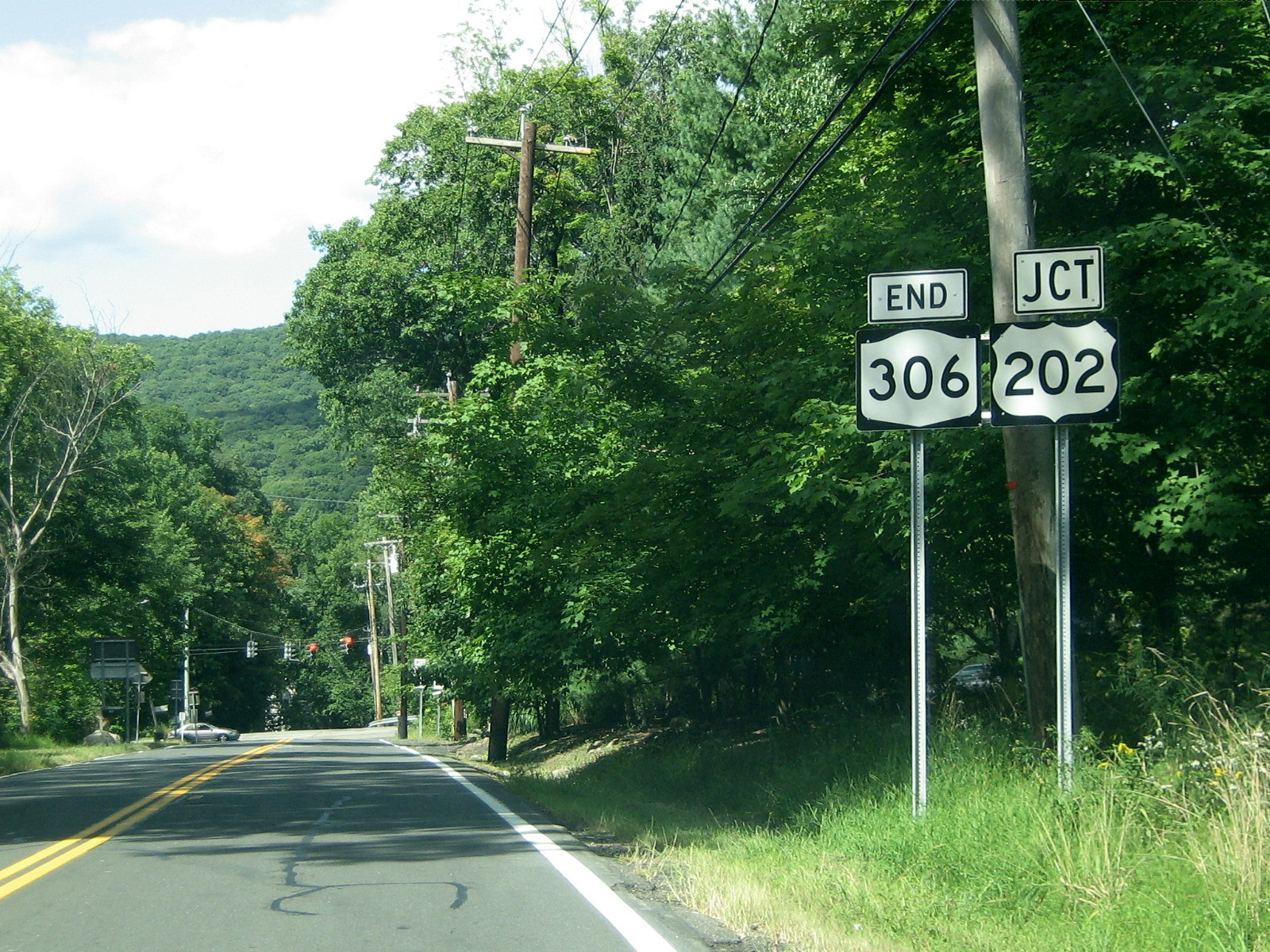
The northern terminus of NY 306 at US 202 in Pomona.

NY 306 begins at NY 59 in the Ramapo hamlet of Monsey and proceeds north as Main Street through part of the business district of Monsey. After passing Maple Avenue in the Jewish village of Kaser, NY 306 becomes Monsey–Ladentown Road for the rest of its run. NY 306 quickly leaves the small village and reenters the town of Ramapo.

Roughly 1 mile (1.6 km) north of Kaser, NY 306 intersects County Route 74 (CR 74). Ramapo High School is located just east of NY 306 on CR 74. NY 306 then passes a large cemetery called Church of the West Hempstead Cemetery. NY 306 continues north past CR 80, and enters the village of Wesley Hills. There it passes a small shopping center, and proceeds into residential areas. Finally, NY 306 enters Pomona at CR 86. The route ends shortly afterward at US 202.

== History ==
When NY 306 was assigned as part of the 1930 renumbering of state highways in New York, it extended from the New Jersey state line in the south to Willow Grove Road (then part of NY 210) in the north via East Saddle River Road, Monsey–Ladentown Road, and Call Hollow Road. NY 306 was truncated to its current northern terminus at US 202 in Ramapo (now part of the village of Pomona) c. 1939 and to its modern southern end at NY 59 in Monsey c. 1962. The former extensions of NY 306 are now largely maintained by Rockland County as CR 73 (East Saddle River Road) and CR 75 (Call Hollow Road north of the Ramapo town line). The current southern terminus of NY 306 in Monsey was the proposed southwestern terminus of the Spring Valley Bypass, a bypass of NY 45 and NY 59 that was never built.

== Major intersections ==
The entire route is in Rockland County.

Location	mi	km	Destinations	Notes
Town of Ramapo	0.00	0.00	NY 59 / CR 73 south – Spring Valley, Suffern	Southern terminus; northern terminus of CR 73; hamlet of Monsey
Pomona	5.33	8.58	US 202	Northern terminus
1.000 mi = 1.609 km; 1.000 km = 0.621 mi
