= New York State Route 45 (disambiguation) =

New York State Route 45 is a north–south state highway in Rockland County, New York, United States, that was established in the late 1940s.

New York State Route 45 may also refer to:

- New York State Route 45 (1920s–1930) in Rensselaer County
- New York State Route 45 (1930 – 1949) in Orange County
