= Palisades Interstate Parkway =

Highway in New Jersey and New York

Palisades Interstate Parkway
- Map of the New York City metropolitan area with Palisades Interstate Parkway highlighted in red

Route information
- Maintained by Palisades Interstate Park Commission
- Length: 37.00 mi (59.55 km)
- Existed: 1958–present
- Component highways: Route 445 (unsigned) in New Jersey; NY 987C (unsigned) in New York; US 6 from Harriman State Park to Bear Mountain State Park
- Tourist routes: Palisades Scenic Byway
- Restrictions: No commercial vehicles

Major junctions
- South end: US 9W / Route 67Fletcher Avenue Lemoine Avenue in Fort Lee, NJ
- Route 67 in Fort Lee, NJ; NY 303 in Tappan, NY; CR 20 in Orangeburg, NY; NY 59 in West Nyack, NY; I-87 / I-287 / New York Thruway in Nanuet, NY; US 202 / NY 45 / CR 47 in Mount Ivy, NY; US 6 / Seven Lakes Drive in Harriman State Park
- North end: US 6 / US 202 / US 9W / US 6 Truck Circle Drive Hessian Drive in Bear Mountain State Park

Location
- Country: United States
- States: New Jersey, New York
- Counties: NJ: Bergen; NY: Rockland, Orange

Highway system
- New Jersey State Highway Routes; Interstate; US; State; Scenic Byways
- New York Highways; Interstate; US; State; Reference; Parkways
← Route 444	Route 445	→ Route 446

The Palisades Interstate Parkway (PIP) is a 38.25-mile (61.56 km) controlled-access parkway in the U.S. states of New Jersey and New York. The parkway is a major commuter route into New York City from Rockland and Orange counties in New York and Bergen County in New Jersey. The southern terminus of the route is at the George Washington Bridge in Fort Lee, New Jersey, where it connects to Interstate 95 (I-95), US 1-9, and US 46. Its northern terminus is at a traffic circle in Fort Montgomery, New York, where the PIP meets US 9W and US 202 at the Bear Mountain Bridge. At exit 18, the PIP forms a concurrency with US 6 for the remaining duration of its run.

The route is named for the Hudson River Palisades, a line of cliffs rising along the western side of the Hudson River. The PIP is designated, but not signed as Route 445 in New Jersey and New York State Route 987C (NY 987C), an unsigned reference route, in New York. As with most parkways in the New York metropolitan area, commercial traffic is prohibited from using the PIP. The Palisades Interstate Parkway was built from 1947 to 1958, and fully opened to traffic on August 28, 1958.

== Route description ==
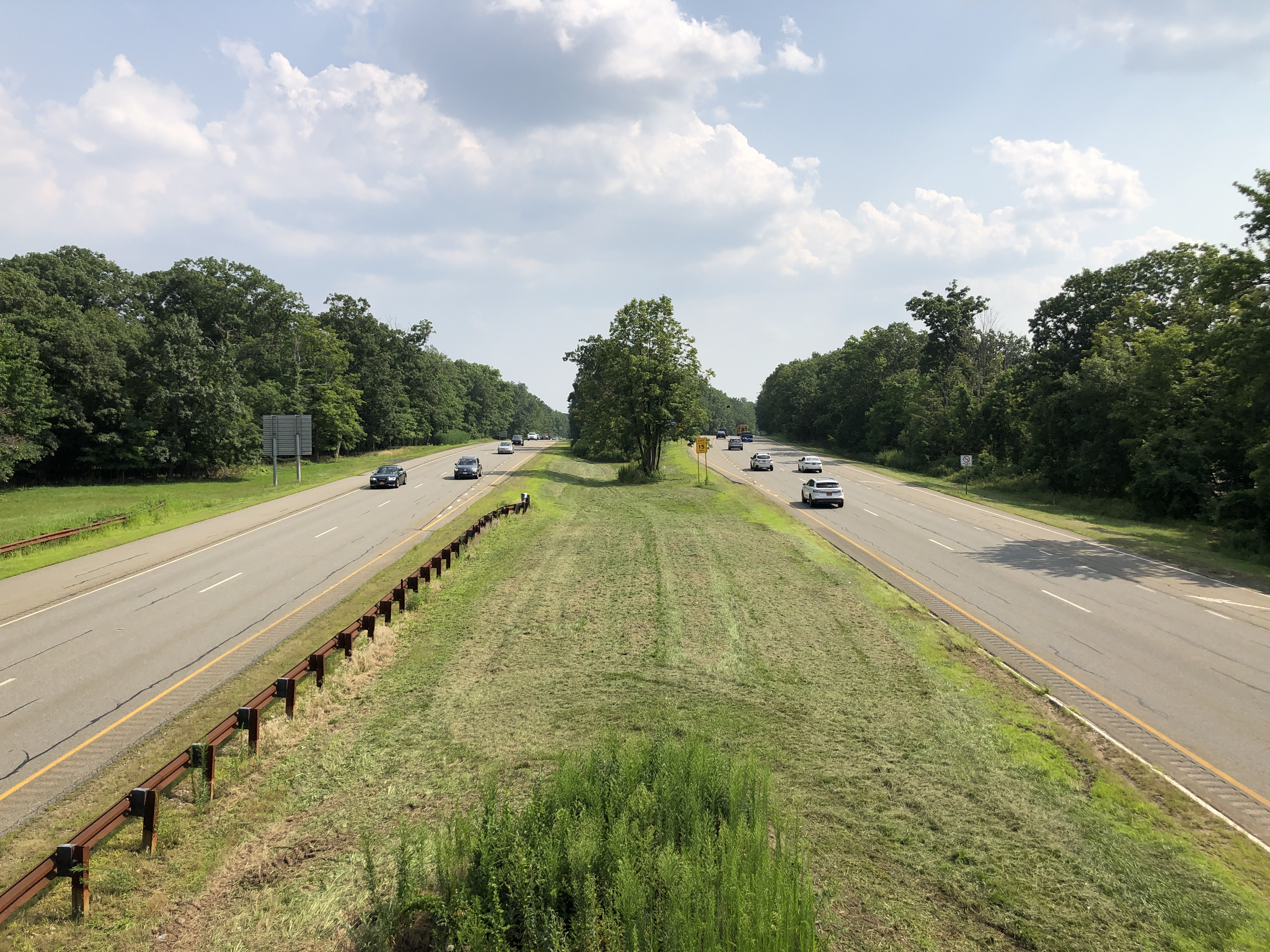
Palisades Interstate Parkway southbound in Alpine, New Jersey

The mainline of the parkway is designated as Route 445 in New Jersey and NY 987C in New York. The latter is one of New York's reference routes. A 0.42-mile (0.68 km) spur connecting the parkway to US 9W in Fort Lee, New Jersey, is designated Route 445S. All three designations are unsigned and used only for inventory purposes. The parkway is owned and maintained by the Palisades Interstate Park Commission but occasional maintenance is performed by the New Jersey and New York state departments of transportation. Commercial vehicles are prohibited on the entire length of the Palisades Interstate Parkway. The speed limit on the highway used to be 50 mph (80 km/h) south of the New York State Thruway and 55 mph (89 km/h) north of it. As of October 2018, it is 55 mph for the entire length.

=== New Jersey ===
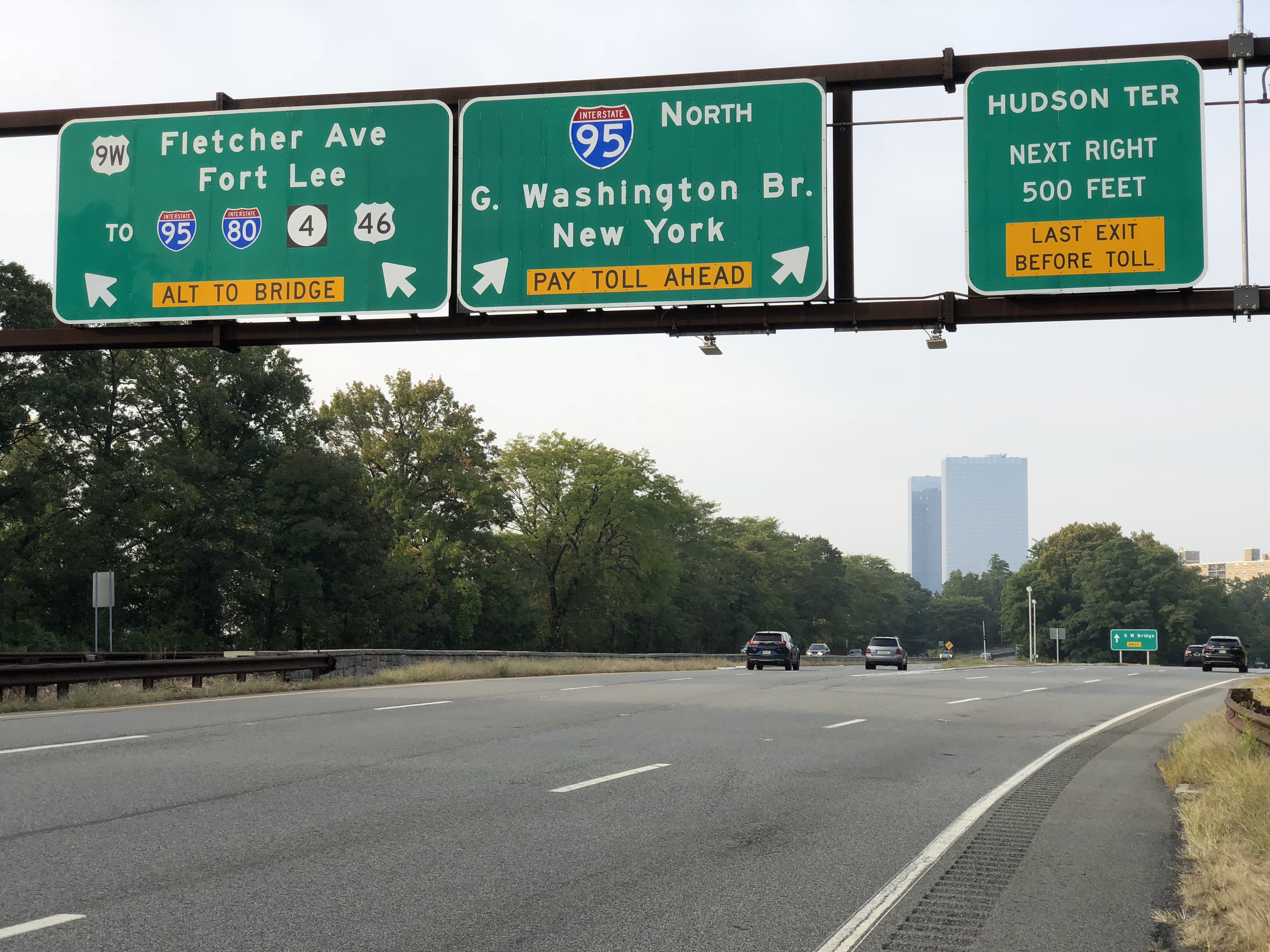
The split of the mainline parkway and its short spur to US 9W in Fort Lee. The parkway feeds a significant amount of traffic into the George Washington Bridge.

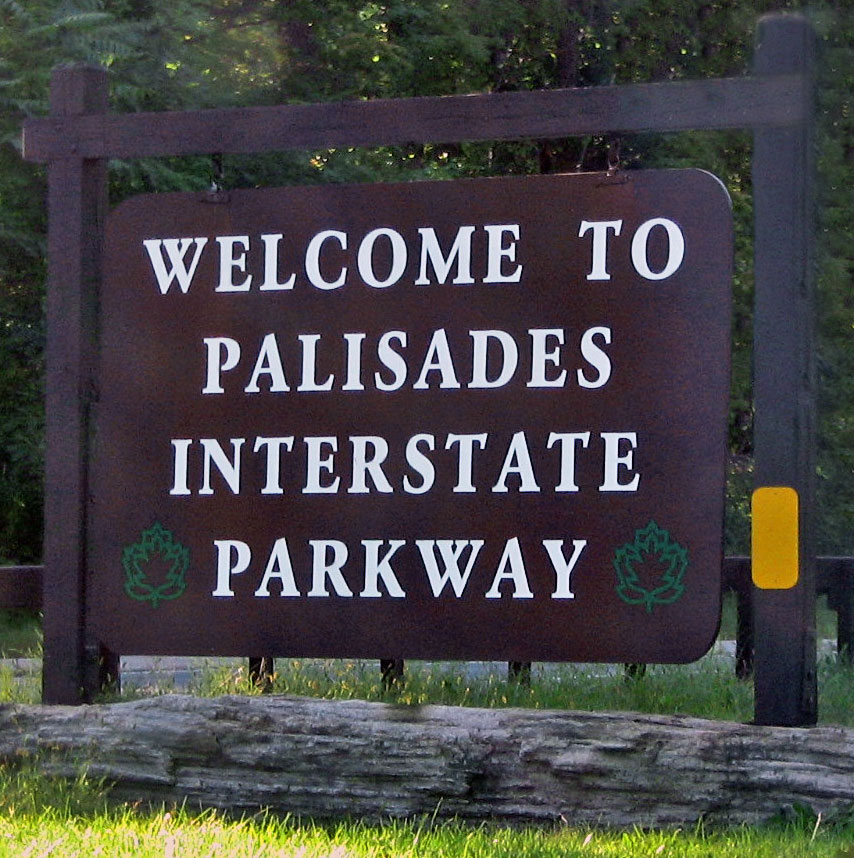
Welcome sign at the parkway's northern terminus in Orange County

The Palisades Interstate Parkway begins at the George Washington Bridge (GWB) in Fort Lee, New Jersey. Passengers from the upper level of the GWB can directly access the PIP northbound, while passengers from the lower level of the bridge must travel through GWB Plaza on US 9W before getting on the parkway. Passengers traveling northbound on the New Jersey Turnpike (I-95) must be in local lanes to directly get on the PIP or be forced to get off the last exit in Fort Lee before the GWB. Once the PIP leaves the GWB, it proceeds north along the New Jersey Palisades, past the Englewood Cliffs Service Area. Unlike service areas further north along the parkway, there are two in Englewood, one for northbound drivers and one for southbound drivers. The others are in the center median shared by drivers going in both directions. There are also three different scenic lookout points over the Palisades near the northern tip of the island of Manhattan at the Harlem River. After this, the PIP parallels US 9W and the Hudson River for its entire run in New Jersey. The PIP leaves New Jersey into New York in the borough of Rockleigh.

The entire New Jersey portion of the Palisades Interstate Parkway is within Bergen County. It is designated as a state scenic byway known as the Palisades Scenic Byway. The PIP, the New Jersey Turnpike, Interstate 278, and Interstate 676 are the only highways that use sequential exit numbering in New Jersey; all others in the state are based on mileage, except for the Atlantic City–Brigantine Connector in Atlantic City, which uses lettered exits (no numerals).

=== New York ===
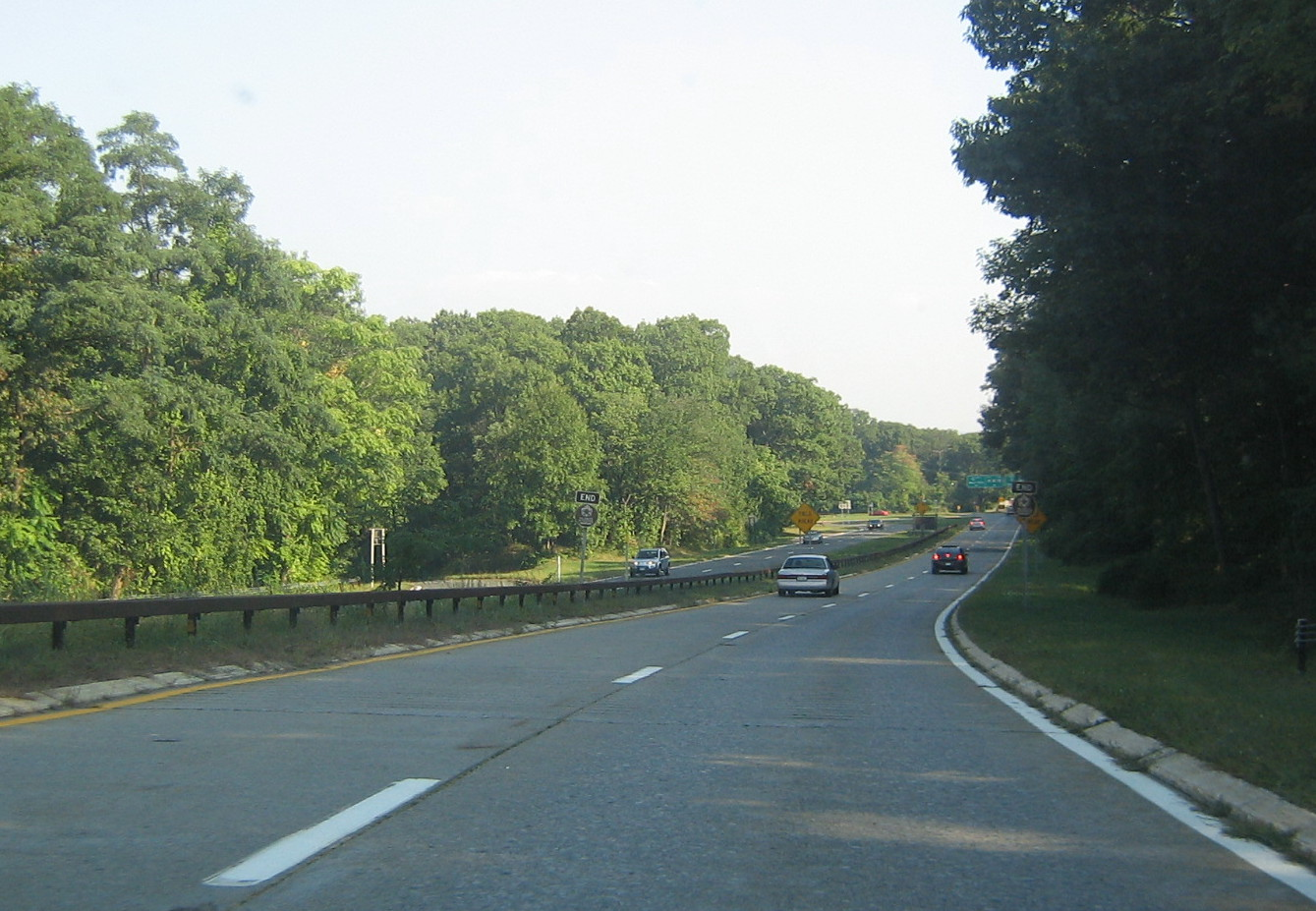
The parkway's northern terminus at Bear Mountain, New York

The parkway enters Rockland County in the hamlet of Palisades. At about the border the PIP changes direction from due north along the Hudson River to a north-west direction. Shortly after the Kings Ferry Service Area in the center median, the first two exits in New York are key exits for two colleges in Rockland County. Exit 5 provides a link to St. Thomas Aquinas College, and exit 6 provides a link to Dominican College. In West Nyack, the PIP has a key interchange with the New York State Thruway (I-87 and I-287). This intersection is about seven miles (11 km) west of the Tappan Zee Bridge. After the PIP's interchange with the NY Thruway, the PIP turns slightly north-east. At exit 13, the PIP intersects US 202 as the route crosses south of Harriman State Park in Mount Ivy. This is the first of two meetings between the PIP and US 202. At exit 15, the PIP has its last busy intersection in Rockland County with County Route 106 (CR 106, formerly part of NY 210) in Stony Point. From here, the PIP enters Harriman State Park, and at exit 16, the PIP intersects Lake Welch Parkway, which is one of several parkways commissioned within the park.

The parkway enters Orange County north of Lake Welch Parkway at exit 16 and south of the Palisades Interstate Park Commission Visitor Center, located in the center median in what was originally a parkway service area. The first interchange in Orange County is exit 17 at Anthony Wayne Recreation Area. At exit 18, the PIP intersects US 6 and Seven Lakes Drive. US 6 west heads toward the Thruway and NY 17 five miles (8.0 km) west in Harriman. US 6 east forms the PIP's only concurrency for the last two miles (3.2 km) of the PIP's run. Seven Lakes Drive joins the two routes for one mile (1.6 km) before departing at exit 19. The two routes then enter Bear Mountain State Park in an eastern direction. Finally, the Palisades Interstate Parkway meets its end at US 9W and US 202 at a traffic circle near the Hudson River and the Bear Mountain Bridge. US 6 and US 202 head east over the bridge, while US 9W heads north toward the United States Military Academy in West Point. (Southbound US 9W, breaking off to the right, is the same road as westbound US 202.)

== History ==
- Palisade Interstate Parkway
- U.S. National Register of Historic Places
- U.S. Historic district
- New Jersey Register of Historic Places
- Location within Bergen County, New Jersey
- Coordinates: 41°4′37.2″N 73°59′2.4″W
- Area: 3,311 acres (1,340 ha)
- NRHP reference No.: 99000940
- NJRHP No.: 102

Significant dates
- Added to NRHP: August 2, 1999
- Designated NJRHP: October 3, 1999

In 1933–34, the first thoughts of a Palisades Interstate Parkway were developed by engineer and environmentalist William A. Welch, who was general manager and chief engineer of the Palisades Interstate Park Commission. The plan was to build a parkway to connect the New Jersey Palisades with the state parks along the Hudson River in Rockland and Orange counties. Welch would soon garner the support of John D. Rockefeller, who donated 700 acres (2.8 km^{2}) of land along the New Jersey Palisades overlooking the Hudson River in 1933. With this favorable momentum for the new route, the proposed route was accepted as a Civil Works Administration project under Franklin D. Roosevelt's New Deal coalition. However, the New Jersey Highway Commission did not support construction, so the idea of a parkway was put on hold. Instead, they built an 8 miles (13 km) road along the western bank of the Hudson River called the Henry Hudson Drive, a small scenic road that is a precursor to the Parkway and is still open today.

During the 1940s, Rockefeller renewed the push for a parkway along the New Jersey Palisades, and teamed with ultimate PIP planner, Robert Moses, to establish and design the parkway. The plan originally was to have the PIP stretch from the Garden State Parkway, along the Hudson River, to the George Washington Bridge, and then north along its present-day route ending at the Bear Mountain Bridge. This southern extension was never built, but construction began on the current PIP in New York on April 1, 1947. Construction on the New Jersey portion began about one year later, paralleling the nearby Henry Hudson Drive. Construction was delayed twice due to material shortages, but that did not stop the PIP from being opened in stages during the 1940s and 1950s. The route was completed in New Jersey in 1957, and on August 28, 1958, the final piece of the PIP was completed between exits 5 and 9 in southern Rockland County.

The PIP is known for its stone arch overpasses throughout its route and its several scenic overlooks in New Jersey. All sorts of unique trees and flowers can be seen along the route as well. In 1998, because of all the natural and constructed beauty, the PIP was designated as a national landmark by the National Park Service.

The Parkway suffered from severe flooding and a minor structural collapse on July 9, 2023, near the Bear Mountain Bridge as a result of severe storms.

== Exit list ==
While most highways in the U.S. reset their mile markers and exit numbers when crossing a state line, the Palisades Parkway does not reset either.

State	County	Location	mi	km	Exit	Destinations	Notes
New Jersey	Bergen	Fort Lee	0.00	0.00	0	I-95 Toll north / US 1-9 north (George Washington Bridge Upper Level) – New York City	Southern terminus; exit 74 on I-95
New Jersey	Bergen	Fort Lee			1A	Hudson Terrace	Southbound exit and entrance; last southbound exit before toll
New Jersey	Bergen	Fort Lee			1B	US 9W (Fletcher Avenue) / Route 67 south to I-95 south / I-80 west / US 46 west / Route 4 west – Fort Lee	Access via Route 445S; southbound exit and northbound entrance; Route 67 not signed
New Jersey	Bergen	Fort Lee	0.96– 1.03	1.54– 1.66	Gas stations (one on each side, no crossover)		
New Jersey	Bergen	Englewood Cliffs	1.93	3.11	2A	Palisade Avenue (CR 505) – Englewood Cliffs, Englewood	
New Jersey	Bergen	Englewood Cliffs	2.60	4.18	Rockefeller Lookout (northbound side only)		
New Jersey	Bergen	Alpine	5.43	8.74	Alpine Lookout (northbound side only)		
New Jersey	Bergen	Alpine	7.52	12.10	2B	US 9W – Alpine, Closter	
New Jersey	Bergen	Alpine	9.17	14.76	Palisades Interstate Park Commission Visitor Center & State Line Lookout		
New Jersey	Bergen	Alpine	9.17	14.76	3	US 9W	Northbound access is via center median u-turn ramp
New Jersey	Bergen	Alpine	10.44	16.80	4	US 9W – Sparkill, NY, Piermont, NY	
			11.06	17.80	New Jersey–New York state line		
New York	Rockland	Sparkill	12.75	20.52	Sparkill Service Area		
New York	Rockland	Tappan	13.50	21.73	5	NY 303 – Orangeburg, Tappan	Signed as exits 5N (north) and 5S (south)
New York	Rockland	Orangeburg	14.40	23.17	6	CR 20 (Orangeburg Road) – Orangeburg, Pearl River	Signed as exits 6E (east) and 6W (west)
New York	Rockland	West Nyack	17.20	27.68	7	CR 42 (Town Line Road) – Nanuet, West Nyack	
New York	Rockland	West Nyack	18.00	28.97	8E-W	NY 59 – Nyack, Spring Valley	Signed as exits 8E (east) and 8W (west)
New York	Rockland	West Nyack	18.80	30.26	9E-W	I-87 / I-287 / New York Thruway – White Plains, New York City, Albany	Signed as exits 9E (south/east) and 9W (north/west); New York City not signed northbound
New York	Rockland	New City	20.40	32.83	10	CR 33 (North Middletown Road) – New City, Nanuet	
New York	Rockland	New Hempstead	22.50	36.21	11	CR 80 (New Hempstead Road) – New City, New Square	
New York	Rockland	New Hempstead	24.00	38.62	12	NY 45 – New Hempstead, Spring Valley	Serves Clover Stadium
New York	Rockland	Pomona	25.20	40.56	13	US 202 / NY 45 south / CR 47 north – Pomona, Haverstraw, Suffern	Northern terminus of NY 45; southern terminus of CR 47
New York	Rockland	Stony Point	27.50	44.26	14	CR 98 (Willow Grove Road) – West Haverstraw	
New York	Rockland	Stony Point	28.60	46.03	15	CR 106 (Gate Hill Road) – Stony Point	Former NY 210
New York	Rockland	Harriman State Park	29.90	48.12	16	Lake Welch Parkway south / Tiorati Brook Road west – Lake Welch, Sebago Beach	No northbound entrance; Lake Welch Parkway signed as Lake Welch Drive; Tiorati Brook Road not signed
New York	Rockland	Harriman State Park	33.10	53.27	Palisades Interstate Park Commission Visitor Center		
New York	Orange	Harriman State Park	33.80	54.40	17	Anthony Wayne Recreation Area	
New York	Orange	Harriman State Park	34.00	54.72	18	US 6 west / Seven Lakes Drive west to I-87 Toll / New York Thruway / NY 17 – Central Valley	Southern end of US 6/Seven Lakes Drive concurrency
New York	Orange	Bear Mountain State Park	34.60	55.68	19	Seven Lakes Drive east to Perkins Memorial Drive – Bear Mountain State Park	Northern end of Seven Lakes Drive concurrency
New York	Orange	Bear Mountain State Park	37.00	59.55	20	US 6 east / US 202 (Bear Mountain Bridge) / US 9W / US 6 Truck west – Fort Montgomery, West Point, Peekskill, Haverstraw	Northern terminus; northern end of US 6 concurrency; eastern terminus of US 6 Truck; Bear Mountain Circle
1.000 mi = 1.609 km; 1.000 km = 0.621 mi: Concurrency terminus; Electronic toll collection; Incomplete access

== Rest areas ==
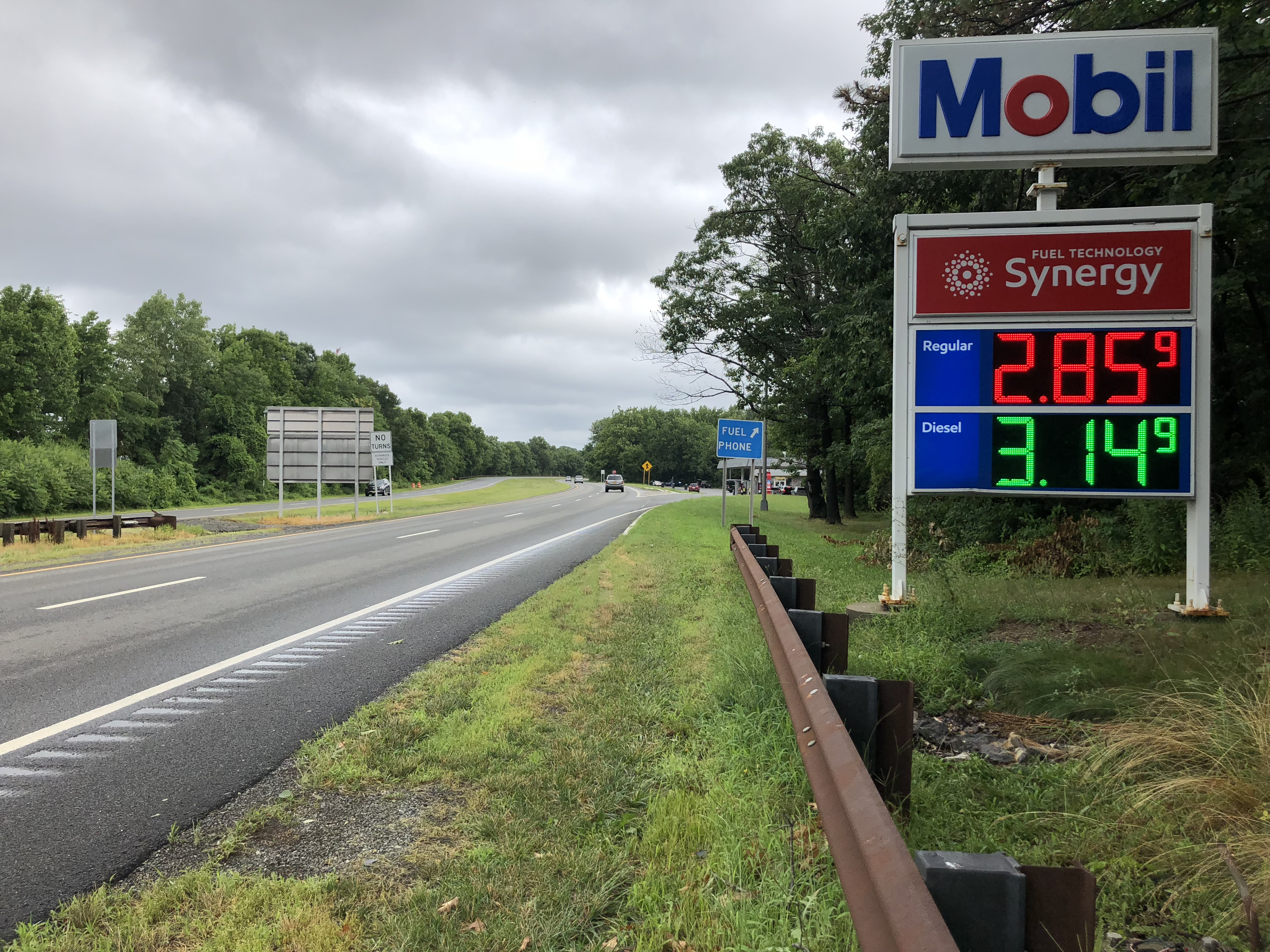
Northbound gas station in Englewood Cliffs, New Jersey

There are some rest areas on the Palisades Interstate Parkway.

- Sparkill (located just south of Exit 5, fuel and convenience store. Open 24 Hours. Park and Ride also available. Accessible both sides.) (New York)
- Englewood Cliffs (located past exit 1 just before the George Washington Bridge, fuel and convenience store. There are two separate rest areas on both sides. Phone service is also available.) (New Jersey)
- Alpine Lookout (Alpine): (North side only. Located near exit 2. Parking/scenic view area only. No fuel.) (New Jersey)
- Rockefeller Lookout (Englewood Cliffs): (North side only. Parking/scenic view area only. No fuel.) (New Jersey)
- Bear Mountain/Tomkins Cove (located between exits 16 and 17. Information and book store. No fuel. Accessible both sides.) (New York)
- State Line Lookout (Visitor center and lookout. No fuel). (New Jersey)

== Palisades Interstate Parkway Police ==
The Palisades Interstate Parkway Police is a highway law enforcement agency for protecting the New Jersey section of the Palisades Interstate Parkway. Its headquarters is located in Alpine, New Jersey.

=== Controversies ===
In May 2018, State Assemblyman Gordon Johnson suggested instituting state oversight of the department.

After a number of press reports of misconduct, the Bergen County Prosecutor's Office conducted an investigation that led to Chief Michael Coppola being suspended for ninety days starting in mid-July 2018. The prosecutor found the department had an incentive program to encourage officers to write more traffic tickets.

The investigation also showed that most of the department's high-speed chases were in violation of the State Attorney General's policy on such pursuits. At least one of these resulted in a fatal crash.

In August 2018, Coppola resigned after he was arrested for allegedly buying cocaine and having it shipped to his post office box. He was replaced by Steven Shallop.

== See also ==
- Myles, William J. (1999). Harriman Trails, A Guide and History. New York, NY: The New York–New Jersey Trail Conference.
