= New York State Route 303 =

State highway in Rockland County, New York, US

New York State Route 303
- Map of Rockland County in southeastern New York with NY 303 highlighted in red

Route information
- Maintained by NYSDOT
- Length: 10.92 mi (17.57 km)
- Existed: 1930–present

Major junctions
- South end: CR 505 at the New Jersey state line in Tappan
- Palisades Parkway in Tappan; NY 340 in Orangeburg; NY 59 in Central Nyack; I-87 / I-287 / New York Thruway in West Nyack
- North end: US 9W in Congers

Location
- Country: United States
- State: New York
- Counties: Rockland

Highway system
- New York Highways; Interstate; US; State; Reference; Parkways
| ← NY 302 | → NY 304 |

New York State Route 303 (NY 303) is a north–south state highway in eastern Rockland County, New York, in the United States. It begins at the New Jersey state line in the hamlet of Tappan and runs generally northward for 10.92 miles (17.57 km) to an intersection with U.S. Route 9W (US 9W) in Clarkstown. The route has connections to the Palisades Interstate Parkway and the New York State Thruway, the latter carrying Interstate 87 (I-87) and I-287. NY 303 was assigned as part of the 1930 renumbering of state highways in New York, and only minor realignments have occurred since that time.

== Route description ==
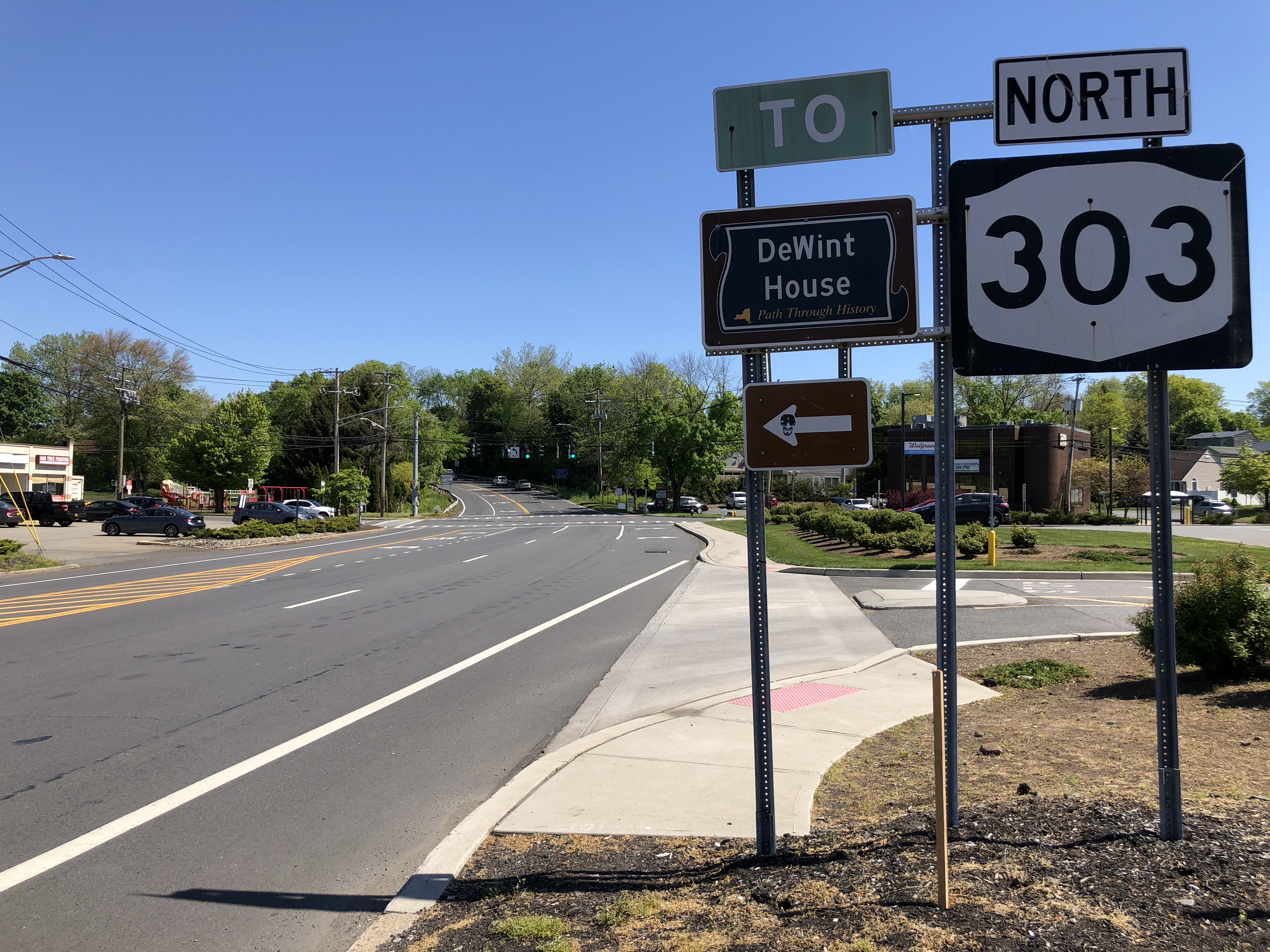
Northbound on NY 303 just north of the state line in Tappan

NY 303 begins at the New Jersey–New York border in Tappan, a hamlet in the town of Orangetown. Directly south of the border is Bergen County, New Jersey, in which the road continues as County Route 505 (CR 505). NY 303 begins as a four-lane route with mostly full access, and it retains this status until Valley Cottage. As it progresses northward, it intersects the Palisades Interstate Parkway (PIP) at exit 5 in Tappan. The interchange is the southernmost New York exit along the PIP. Right after the PIP junction, NY 303 enters Orangeburg, where it intersects the signed northern terminus of NY 340. NY 303 also intersects CR 20 at this location. At these intersections, NY 303 connects to St. Thomas Aquinas College and Dominican College by way of NY 340 and CR 20, respectively.

The route continues northward into Blauvelt, where it runs along the western border of Clausland Mountain County Park, Blauvelt State Park, and other town parks. While in Blauvelt, NY 303 briefly overlaps with CR 11, a mostly parallel county route that veers west to avoid the state park. Past CR 11, NY 303 proceeds north into the town of Clarkstown and the hamlet of Central Nyack, home to NY 303's interchange with NY 59. After the junction, NY 303 passes Palisades Center and intersects the New York State Thruway (I-87 and I-287) at exit 12, a modified partial cloverleaf interchange located adjacent to the mall. The south half of the interchange utilizes the loop road surrounding Palisades Center while the north half uses part of Snake Hill Road.

Just after Palisades Center, NY 303 briefly turns from a four-lane road to a four-lane divided highway in Valley Cottage. This is short-lived, however, as NY 303 reverts to a two-lane undivided route at an intersection with Storms Road. Farther north, NY 303 enters the vicinity of Congers, passing east of Congers Lake prior to intersecting CR 80. Past this point, NY 303 proceeds toward its northern terminus at US 9W. NY 303 ends in northern Clarkstown, less than 1 mile (1.6 km) from the Haverstraw town line and NY 304's northern terminus. The intersection between NY 303 and US 9W is roughly 0.7 miles (1.1 km) south of where US 9W connects to NY 304.

== History ==
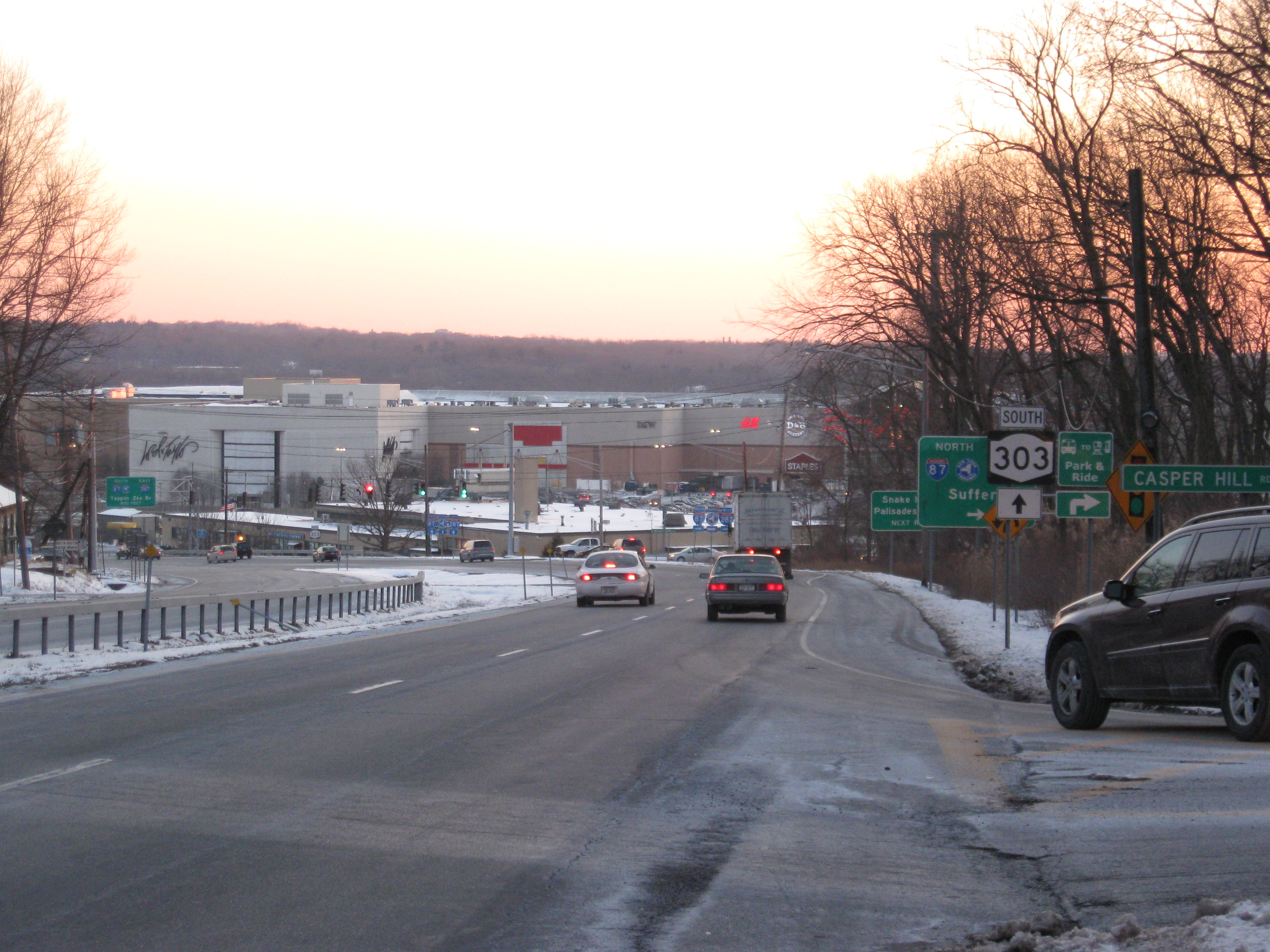
Approaching the New York State Thruway and Palisades Center on NY 303 southbound

NY 303 was assigned as part of the 1930 renumbering of state highways in New York. The route initially followed its current alignment from the New Jersey state line north to Orangeburg, where it continued northward on Greenbush Road to its end in Central Nyack. North of this point, NY 303 followed Kings Highway and Old Haverstraw Road to US 9W near Congers. It was moved onto its current alignment south of Central Nyack by 1932 and shifted onto its modern routing north of Central Nyack c. 1936.

The north end of NY 303 initially connected to US 9W by way of a partial interchange. Northbound NY 303 fed directly into US 9W northbound, while southbound NY 303 began as a ramp leading from US 9W southbound. The junction was rebuilt as an at-grade intersection in the 1980s. Near Central Nyack, the interchange with the New York State Thruway was originally a traditional partial cloverleaf interchange with no connection to any other roads. It was redesigned in the 1990s to accommodate the addition of Palisades Center, which was built where the formerly proposed Northern Extension of the New Jersey Turnpike would have ended at a junction with the Thruway.

The "Blauvelt Bypass," a quarter-mile paved path for bicyclists and pedestrians, was completed in July 2019 to connect two segments of Greenbush Road along NY 303 in Blauvelt. The bicycle path was built to limit accidents on NY 303, which has no shoulder at its intersections with Greenbush Road.

== Major intersections ==
The entire route is in Rockland County.

| Location | mi | km | Destinations | Notes |
|---|---|---|---|---|
| Tappan | 0.00 | 0.00 | CR 505 south (Livingston Street) | Continuation into New Jersey |
| Tappan | 1.40 | 2.25 | Palisades Parkway – New York, Bear Mountain | Cloverleaf interchange; exits 5N-S on Palisades Parkway |
| Orangeburg | 2.04 | 3.28 | NY 340 east – Sparkill, St. Thomas Aquinas College | Western terminus of NY 340 |
| Central Nyack | 5.50 | 8.85 | NY 59 – Nyack, Nanuet, Spring Valley | Interchange |
| West Nyack | 5.92 | 9.53 | I-87 / I-287 / New York Thruway – Governor Mario M. Cuomo Bridge, Suffern | Access via Palisades Center Drive; exit 12 on I-87 / I-287 / Thruway |
| Congers | 10.92 | 17.57 | US 9W – Haverstraw, New City, Nyack | Northern terminus |
1.000 mi = 1.609 km; 1.000 km = 0.621 mi
