= Frank Laskier =

Merchant Navy personnel and writer

- Seaman Frank in a 1941 newsreel describes losing his foot to machine gun fire. "Do you think I'm going to let them get away with that?" he vows, "Not pygmalion likely!"
- Born: 1912; New Brighton, England,
- Died: 8 July 1949 (aged 36–37); New York City, New York, U.S.
- Occupations: Merchant Sailor; Author
- Employer: Merchant Navy
- Notable work: My Name is Frank

Frank Geoffrey Laskier (1912 – 8 July 1949) New Brighton, Wirral, was a British seaman, author and war hero who came to public attention during World War II.

In late 1940, Laskier was a gunner in the Merchant Navy when his ship was attacked and sunk by a German raider off the coast of West Africa. Rescued from a raft and returned to Britain, he was interviewed by BBC radio. His famous "My Name is Frank" broadcasts during the Battle of the Atlantic affected popular opinion about the war and helped Merchant Navy recruitment efforts in America and Britain.

"Seaman Frank" became a figurehead of the Merchant Navy in newsreels, speaking tours and autobiographical books. By the war's end, sentiment had moved on and he was largely forgotten. At age 37, he died in a car accident near his home in southern New York state. Today, the little that is remembered about Laskier is mixed; one observer described him as just an icon of wartime propaganda, but another critic considers Laskier's autobiographical writing to be "powerful" and the "genuine article" about a seaman's life.

== Biography ==
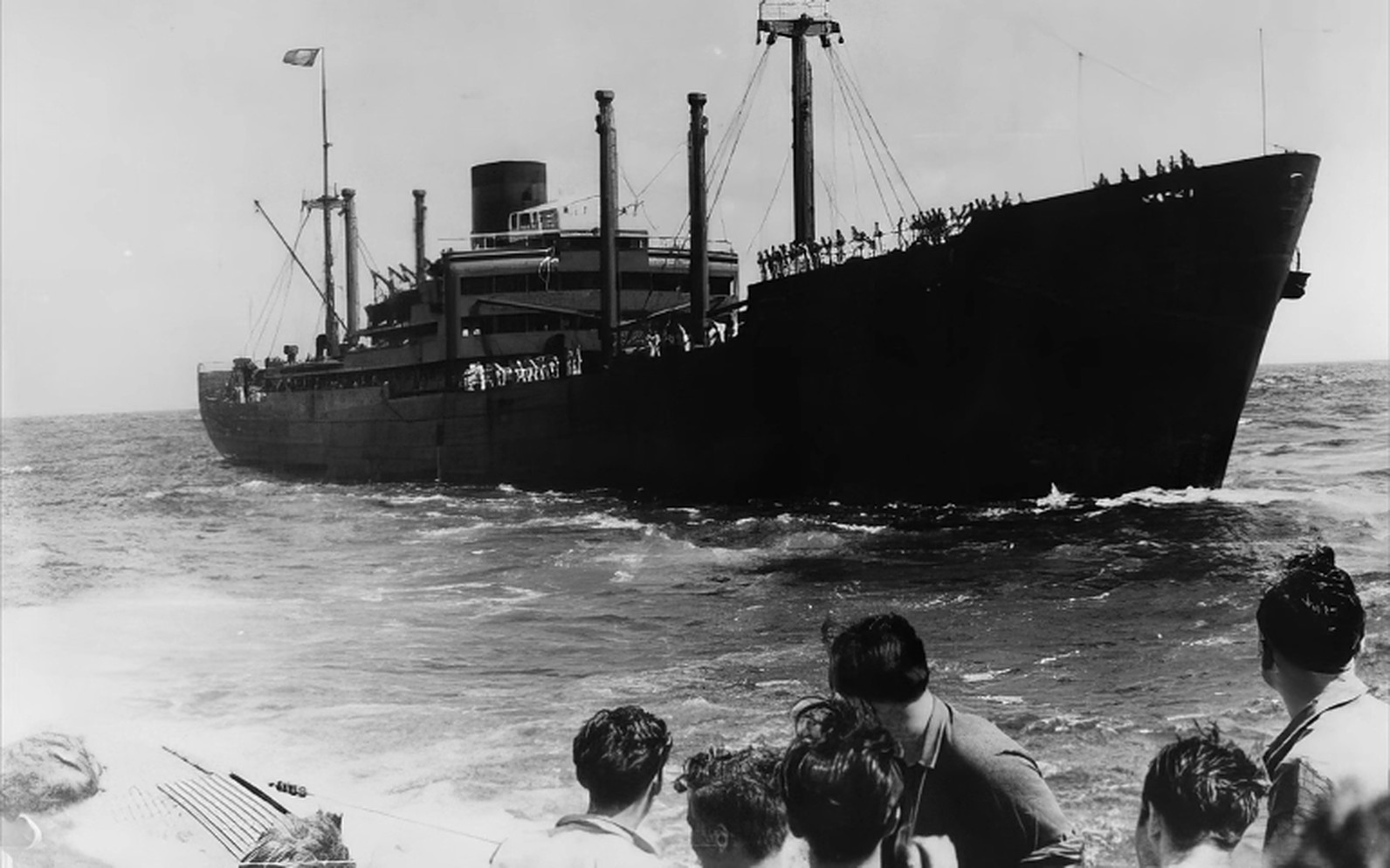
The German raider Kormoran seen here in 1940 meeting a U-Boat with supplies.

Laskier was born in New Brighton Wirral and brought up near the wharves of Liverpool, Lancashire. At age 15 he ran away from home and spent the next ten years working his way around the world from one merchant ship to the next. He drank heavily, patronised prostitutes and even spent a few years in prison for theft; he was the black sheep of his family.

In late 1940, Laskier's ship, Eurylochus, on which he served as a gunner, was attacked and sunk by a merchant raider, the German auxiliary cruiser Kormoran, off the coast of West Africa. He lost a foot to machine gun fire. After two days on a raft, with no water and fending off sharks, he and the remaining crew were rescued by a neutral Spanish merchant ship, Monte Teide. Laskier was repatriated to Britain where it was said, a young BBC radio producer overheard him tell his story in a Liverpool public house. He was convinced to recount his story on J. B. Priestley's Postscript show (Sunday 5 October 1941), so-named because it aired following the news. The Postscript episode, and an encore appearance in which "a merchant seaman talks", reached a wide audience and proved popular with listeners. Laskier was lionised by the press. British journalist Douglas Reed described him:

Here was a humble man without money or schooling. Yet he spoke the tongue that Shakespeare spoke. His voice was soft, but inescapable. He knew Shakespeare, and could interweave Shakespeare's phrases with his story so that they sounded as if they were spun that very moment. When he spoke you could hear the waves thud and smash against the sides, feel the ship lurch and stagger as the torpedo struck, see the men, with strained faces and blowing hair, toiling to get the boats out. He minted his own phrases, too, and they came out shining gold.

External videos
- "Seaman Frank Laskier Describes his Experiences". Postscript broadcast 5 October 1941.

The stories were collected in the book My Name is Frank (1941) of which a reviewer in The Spectator said, "Frank Laskier's broadcasts had the stuff of greatness; put into print they lose nothing in the reading. By a natural genius this seaman has found an expression and a rhythm which the poets and artists of the modern world have been striving after for generations." The book was also kindly reviewed by Otis Ferguson in The New Republic, and by H. Austin Stevens in The New York Times Book Review.

Soon after, Frank appeared in recruitment films to encourage enlistment in the Merchant Marines and went on speaking tours around the United States. One film is a Crown Film Unit production called Seaman Frank Goes Back to Sea which shows Frank patriotically re-enlisting for the Merchant Navy; the narrator calls him a "real Englishman" who does his duty. In another clip for British Pathé, in 1941, Laskier says he wants to go out fighting again (re-enlist) to avenge the deaths of his friends, while the romantic interest with "Mary" would have to wait. He finishes with a rousing statement about losing his foot to machine gun fire from the German raider Kormoran: "Do you think I'm going to let them get away with that?" he vows, "Not pygmalion likely!"

Laskier was also engaged for war propaganda. In one notable example, the Royal Navy enlisted his help to shape the narrative around the sinking of the City of Benares, a liner evacuating children, including many from prominent Jewish families fleeing Europe to Canada. The Royal Navy had chosen not to designate the ship as a hospital vessel, which would have protected it from attack. Instead, it sailed as part of a military convoy with its lights off at night, making it a legitimate military target. After the ship was torpedoed and sunk by the U-boat U-48 — resulting in the loss of 77 children and hundreds of others — the Navy asked Laskier to broadcast a fabricated first-hand account of the tragedy. During his My Name is Frank series, Laskier claimed to have been a witness, stating, "We sailors know they [the Germans] were laying in wait for the City of Benares." His broadcast created the public impression that the Germans had intentionally targeted the children. This charge, however, was disputed after the war and was unsupported by any evidence beyond Laskier's "we know" assertion. The captain of U-48 was later tried for war crimes related to the incident but was acquitted due to lack of evidence.

Laskier's second book, Log Book (1942), was positioned as fiction but is clearly autobiographical, with the main character being called "Jack". Reviewing the book in the New York Herald Tribune Lincoln Colcord called it, "a work of art so simple and acute, that one often pauses to wonder." Laskier's third novel Unseen Harbor is purely fictional, it was reviewed by Fletcher Pratt in The Saturday Review, B. K. Sandwell in Saturday Night, and Arthur Foff in The New York Review of Books. Laskier's fourth and last novel, The Siren Sea, was partially finished at the time of his death; it was completed by novelist John Harris and published in 1953.

After the war Laskier moved to the US, where he tried to garner interest for films of his books. Producer David Lean requested that Mary Hayley Bell write the screenplay for Log Book, which she did, but it was never acquired by a studio. The script for Unseen Harbor was purchased by Twentieth-Century Fox in 1948 to star Dana Andrews, however after Laskier's death in 1949 it never went into production. Laskier and English novelist John Masters became friends after the war. Masters was impressed by the "rhythm and force" of how Laskier put words together. "He passed on to me a sense of the power of the English language". Masters recounted stories of how Laskier and he went to bars where they drank "lots of beer" and engaged in fake knife fights that involved Master's stabbing Laskier's wooden foot, unbeknownst to shocked bystanders.

== Death and legacy ==
Laskier died on 8 July 1949, aged 37, in a car accident in New City, New York, the small town where he lived with his wife Joyce Laskier on South Mountain Road, a kind of artist's colony. The accident occurred on Route 304 near their home. Laskier was the passenger, and the driver was the young wife of a local New City dentist. At around 9pm, soon after dark, the car somehow left the road and plowed into a tree. She was unhurt, Laskier was killed.

"Seaman Frank" and his works have largely been forgotten, "Laskier was quickly forgotten when his propaganda value had faded." Tony Lane refers to him as a "Stakhanov", the Russian coal miner made a workers' hero by Soviet propagandists. However, his writing still garners praise; The Neglected Books Page, an online site that seeks to uncover neglected but deserving books, found Log Book to be "powerful" and the "genuine article" about a seaman's life.

== Works ==
=== Books, film and radio ===
- Seaman Frank Laskier Describes His Experiences (two-shellac 78 rpm disc set of the Postscript broadcast 5 October 1941, aprox. 12 minutes)
- My Name Is Frank (1941 transcriptions of BBC radio shows; intro William McFee)
- Log Book (1942 autobiographical novel)
- The Call of the Sea (1942 film documentary as narrator)
- Together We Serve (1944 recruitment film)
- Unseen Harbor (1947 novel)
- The Siren Sea (1953 posthumous novel; completed by John Harris)

=== Magazine articles ===
- "My Brother Frank", Saturday Night, 11 April 1942 (by John Laskier)
- "Atlantic Crossing", Saturday Night, 14 November 1942
- "'Mac' - The True Story of a Very Gallant Soul", Saturday Night, 11 March 1944
- "It's Not So Bad!", The Atlanta Constitution, 11 June 1944
- "The Carpenter Goes Home", Esquire, December 1944
- "'Stiff-Neck' Robinson", The Atlanta Constitution, 11 March 1945
- "'Any Mail Today?'", The Atlanta Constitution, 26 November 1944
- "Harbor for Santa Claus", Los Angeles Times, 23 December 1945
- "Justice Rides the Bus Line", Coronet, April 1946
- "The House That Courage Built", Coronet, December 1946
- "A Voyage to Persia", Cosmopolitan, July 1946
- "A Nice Cup of Tea", Esquire, October 1947
- "The Cruise of the 'Turpitude'", Esquire, December 1947
- "Alfred and the Staff of Life", Collier's Weekly, 6 December 1947
- "The Indisposition of Mister Macdougal", Collier's Weekly, 14 February 1948
- "The Jonah and the Calliope", Esquire, October 1949
- "Mackimmel's Debt", Esquire, July 1950
