= Mount Ivy, New York =

- Census-designated place
- Location in Rockland County and the state of New York.

- Location within the state of New York
- Coordinates: 41°11′31″N 74°1′56″W
- Country: United States
- State: New York
- County: Rockland
- Town: Haverstraw

Area
  - Total: 1.47 sq mi (3.82 km^{2})
  - Land: 1.47 sq mi (3.82 km^{2})
  - Water: 0 sq mi (0.00 km^{2})
- Elevation: 460 ft (140 m)

Population (2020)
  - Total: 7,657
  - Density: 5,196.2/sq mi (2,006.28/km^{2})
- Time zone: UTC-5 (Eastern (EST))
  - Summer (DST): UTC-4 (EDT)
- ZIP code: 10970
- Area code: 845
- FIPS code: 36-48879
- GNIS feature ID: 0957849

Mount Ivy is a hamlet and census-designated place in the Town of Haverstraw, in Rockland County, New York, United States. It is located north of New City, east of Pomona, south of Thiells, and west of Garnerville. As of the 2020 census, Mount Ivy had a population of 7,657.

== History ==
For many years, the Ramapough Mountain Indians were the inhabitants of this region. It was also an important Quaker settlement.

The name Mount Ivy is said to have been given to the locality because of its elevation and ivy swamp.

Mount Ivy is the location where General Anthony Wayne's troops rested and concealed themselves before the assault of Stony Point fortress.

== Geography ==
Mount Ivy is located at 41°11′31″N 74°1′56″W (41.191839, -74.032162).

According to the United States Census Bureau, the CDP has a total area of 1.5 square miles (3.9 km^{2}), of which 1.5 square miles (3.9 km^{2}) is land and 0.68% is water.

Mount Ivy straddles the border between the towns of Ramapo and Haverstraw, lying within southernmost Haverstraw. The business center of Mount Ivy is located at the northern terminus of New York State Route 45, at its junction with U.S. Route 202, approximately ¼ mile east of the Mount Ivy exit of the Palisades Interstate Parkway.

Mount Ivy is primarily served by the Pomona post office. The hamlet is split between the North Rockland School District and The East Ramapo School District.

== Demographics ==
Historical population
Census	Pop.	Note	%±
2020	7,657		—
U.S. Decennial Census

=== 2020 census ===
As of the 2020 census, Mount Ivy had a population of 7,657.

The median age was 39.0 years. 22.6% of residents were under the age of 18 and 15.3% were 65 years of age or older. For every 100 females, there were 91.8 males, and for every 100 females age 18 and over, there were 88.3 males age 18 and over.

100.0% of residents lived in urban areas, while 0.0% lived in rural areas.

There were 2,906 households in Mount Ivy, of which 31.8% had children under the age of 18 living in them. Of all households, 43.7% were married-couple households, 18.5% were households with a male householder and no spouse or partner present, and 31.1% were households with a female householder and no spouse or partner present. About 28.3% of all households were made up of individuals, and 10.6% had someone living alone who was 65 years of age or older.

There were 3,028 housing units, of which 4.0% were vacant. The homeowner vacancy rate was 1.9% and the rental vacancy rate was 4.6%.

Racial composition as of the 2020 census
Race	Number	Percent
White	3,315	43.3%
Black or African American	1,518	19.8%
American Indian and Alaska Native	37	0.5%
Asian	434	5.7%
Native Hawaiian and Other Pacific Islander	2	0.0%
Some other race	1,459	19.1%
Two or more races	892	11.6%
Hispanic or Latino (of any race)	2,607	34.0%

=== 2000 census ===
As of the census of 2000, there were 6,536 people, 2,693 households, and 1,728 families residing in the CDP. The population density was 4,456.8 inhabitants per square mile (1,720.8/km^{2}). There were 2,761 housing units at an average density of 1,882.7 per square mile (726.9/km^{2}). The racial makeup of the CDP was 78.93% White, 8.48% African American, 0.43% Native American, 4.39% Asian, 0.06% Pacific Islander, 4.44% from other races, and 3.27% from two or more races. Hispanic or Latino of any race were 13.51% of the population. There were 2,693 households, out of which 31.0% had children under the age of 18 living with them, 48.2% were married couples living together, 12.5% had a female householder with no husband present, and 35.8% were non-families. 29.7% of all households were made up of individuals, and 6.6% had someone living alone who was 65 years of age or older. The average household size was 2.42 and the average family size was 3.04.

In the CDP, the population was 23.5% under the age of 18, 7.0% from 18 to 24, 34.8% from 25 to 44, 26.1% from 45 to 64, and 8.6% who were 65 years of age or older. The median age was 36 years. For every 100 females, there were 90.4 males. For every 100 females age 18 and over, there were 85.8 males. The median income for a household in the CDP was $51,935, and the median income for a family was $61,968. Males had a median income of $42,205 versus $38,071 for females. The per capita income for the CDP was $25,685. About 6.9% of families and 8.0% of the population were below the poverty line, including 10.7% of those under age 18 and 7.4% of those age 65 or over.
