= Orangeburg, New York =

- Census-designated place
- Location in Rockland County and the state of New York.

- Location within the state of New York
- Coordinates: 41°2′41″N 73°57′12″W
- Country: United States
- State: New York
- County: Rockland

Area
  - Total: 3.06 sq mi (7.93 km^{2})
  - Land: 3.06 sq mi (7.93 km^{2})
  - Water: 0 sq mi (0.00 km^{2})
- Elevation: 112 ft (34 m)

Population (2020)
  - Total: 4,565
  - Density: 1,490.4/sq mi (575.43/km^{2})
- Time zone: UTC-5 (Eastern (EST))
  - Summer (DST): UTC-4 (EDT)
- ZIP code: 10962
- Area code: 845
- FIPS code: 36-55167
- GNIS feature ID: 0959432

Orangeburg is a hamlet and census-designated place, in the town of Orangetown, Rockland County, New York, United States. It is located north of Tappan, south of Blauvelt, east of Pearl River and west of Piermont. As of the 2020 census, Orangeburg had a population of 4,565.

== Geography ==
Orangeburg is located at 41°2′41″N 73°57′12″W (41.044796, -73.953404).

== History ==
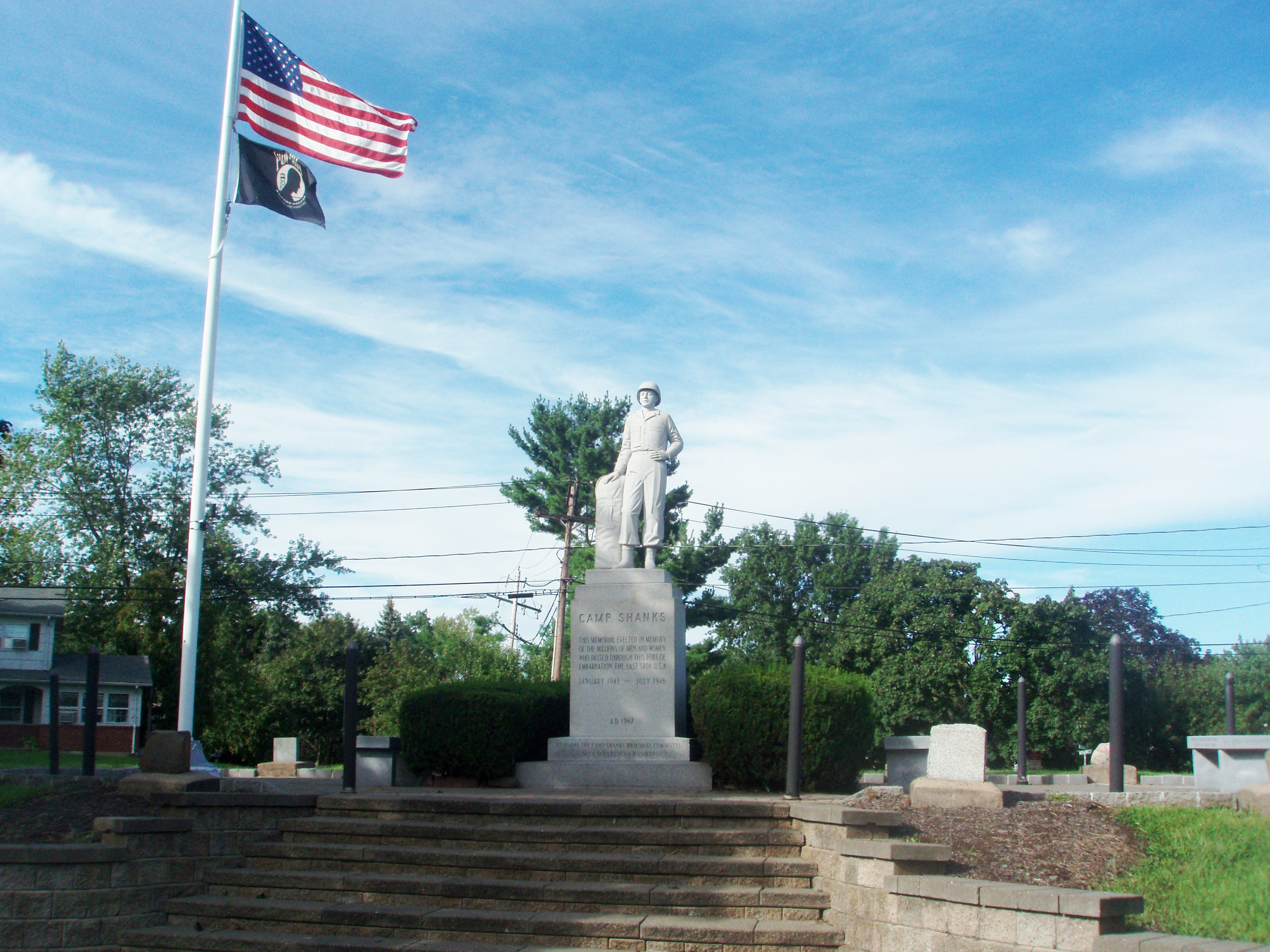
Camp Shanks Memorial Park in Tappan

Orangeburg was the site of Camp Shanks, known as "Last Stop USA", the largest World War II Army embarkation camp. A total of 1.3 million US service personnel en route to Europe were processed at a sprawling camp that covered most of the town. The hamlet also has one of the world's largest psychiatric hospitals, Rockland Psychiatric Center, formerly called Rockland State Hospital. Orangeburg pipe was once manufactured here. Before plastic pipes, it was the standard alternative to metal pipes, especially for sewer and outdoor drainage applications.

After World War II, even through it lies only 19 miles (31 km) north of New York City, Orangeburg was very rural with few residents, many of whom lived quite modestly in former soldiers' housing. That lasted until the late 1950s when developers introduced modern suburban housing to young couples who saw it as an alternative to city living. Today, Orangeburg is a suburb of New York City.

== Demographics ==
Historical population
Census	Pop.	Note	%±
2020	4,565		—
U.S. Decennial Census

=== 2020 census ===
As of the 2020 census, Orangeburg had a population of 4,565. The median age was 41.0 years. 14.5% of residents were under the age of 18 and 24.4% of residents were 65 years of age or older. For every 100 females there were 82.3 males, and for every 100 females age 18 and over there were 78.6 males age 18 and over.

100.0% of residents lived in urban areas, while 0.0% lived in rural areas.

There were 1,498 households in Orangeburg, of which 25.9% had children under the age of 18 living in them. Of all households, 46.6% were married-couple households, 15.5% were households with a male householder and no spouse or partner present, and 34.7% were households with a female householder and no spouse or partner present. About 38.5% of all households were made up of individuals and 28.4% had someone living alone who was 65 years of age or older.

There were 1,534 housing units, of which 2.3% were vacant. The homeowner vacancy rate was 0.0% and the rental vacancy rate was 3.1%.

Racial composition as of the 2020 census
Race	Number	Percent
White	2,885	63.2%
Black or African American	336	7.4%
American Indian and Alaska Native	13	0.3%
Asian	639	14.0%
Native Hawaiian and Other Pacific Islander	3	0.1%
Some other race	361	7.9%
Two or more races	328	7.2%
Hispanic or Latino (of any race)	745	16.3%

=== 2010 census ===
At the 2010 census, there were 4,568 people, 1,531 households and 840 families residing in the village. The population density was 1,473.5 inhabitants per square mile (568.9/km^{2}). There were 1,564 housing units at an average density of 504.5 per square mile (194.8/km^{2}). The racial makeup was 77.3% White, 4.0% African American, 0.2% Native American, 13.2% Asian, 3.2% from other races and 2% from two or more races. Hispanic or Latino of any race were 10.9% of the population.

There were 1,531 households, of which 23.5% had children under the age of 18 living with them, 46.5% were married couples living together, 5.7% had a female householder with no husband present, and 45.1% were non-families. 42.0% of all households were made up of individuals, and 24.4% had someone living alone who was 65 years of age or older. The average household size was 2.35 and the average family size was 3.33.

25.4% of the population were age 19 or under, 10.1% from 20 to 24, 15.5% from 25 to 44, 21.3% from 45 to 64, and 27.7% who were 65 years of age or older. The median age was 44 years. For every 100 females, there were 73.8 males. For every 100 females age 18 and over, there were 69.4 males.

=== Income and poverty ===
The median family income was an estimated $70,859 and the median family income was $128,342. Males had a median income of $50,724 and females $31,477. The average home or condo value in 2009 was $463,300. About 10.73% of families and 27.00% of the population were below the poverty line.

== Landmarks and places of interest ==
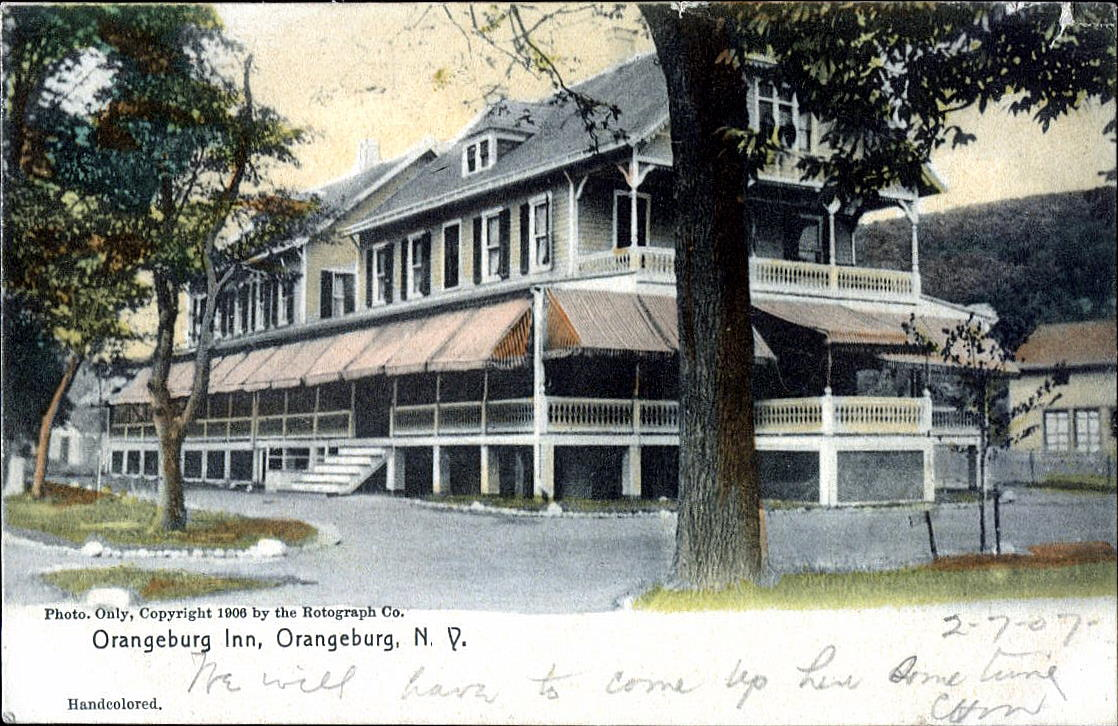
The Orangeburg Inn as seen in 1907

- Camp Shanks Museum and Monument - Independence Avenue - During World War II, over 1.3 million G.I.s were processed from Camp Shanks to Europe and North Africa. Italian and German prisoners of war were housed and repatriated here. The monument is located at Independence Avenue and Lowe Lane off Western Highway. The museum is located on South Greenbush Road near the intersection of Routes 303 and 340 and is open at weekends.
- Douglas House - a Dutch Colonial farmhouse owned by Marjorie Douglas and her late husband Henry that since 1981 has been used for several New York-based film and television productions, including Saturday Night Live and Daredevil.
- New York City FC's training facility is located in Orangeburg.

=== Tallest buildings in Rockland County ===
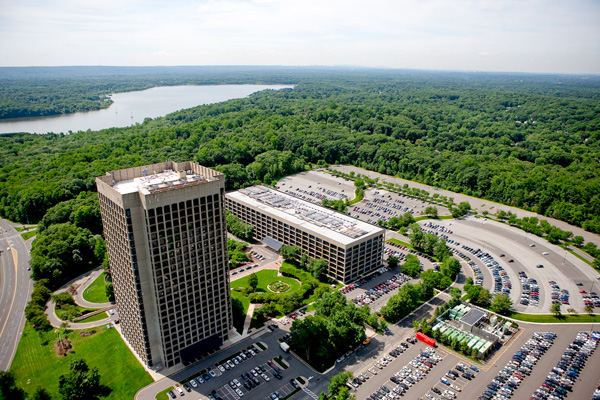
Blue Hill Plaza

Orangeburg has some of the tallest buildings in Rockland County, including

- Blue Hill Plaza
- Rockland Psychiatric Center

=== Historical markers ===
- Clausland Cemetery - Greenbush Road at Mountain Avenue
- Colonial Orangetown - Orangeburg and Hunt roads
- Michael Salyer (March 8, 1757 - April 9, 1810) House - 213 Blue Hill Road
- Shanks Village - 26 Orangeburg Road
- Veterans Memorial Park

== Notable people ==
- Zita Johann, actress.
- Lew Leslie, Broadway writer and producer.
- George Worth, born Gyorgy Woittitz (1915–2006), Olympic medalist saber fencer and chief commissioner of the Orangeburg Fire Department.

== Public transportation ==
Orangeburg can be reached from the Port Authority Bus Terminal in Midtown Manhattan on Coach USA Rockland Coaches bus route #20. The #20 bus travels through Orangeburg along Western Highway, where there are stops on Highview Avenue and Orangeburg Road. Additionally, Transport of Rockland (TOR) Bus #92 offers service to Artopee Way in Nyack and to the Spring Valley Transit Center, and TOR Bus #97 offers service from Orangeburg Road and New York State Route 303 to Oak Tree Road in Tappan and to the Park and Ride on Highway 9W in Stony Point.

== Economy ==
The Streit's kosher food company is headquartered in Orangeburg.

== Pop Culture ==
Orange Is The New Black was filmed in Orangeburg.
