= List of county routes in Rockland County, New York =

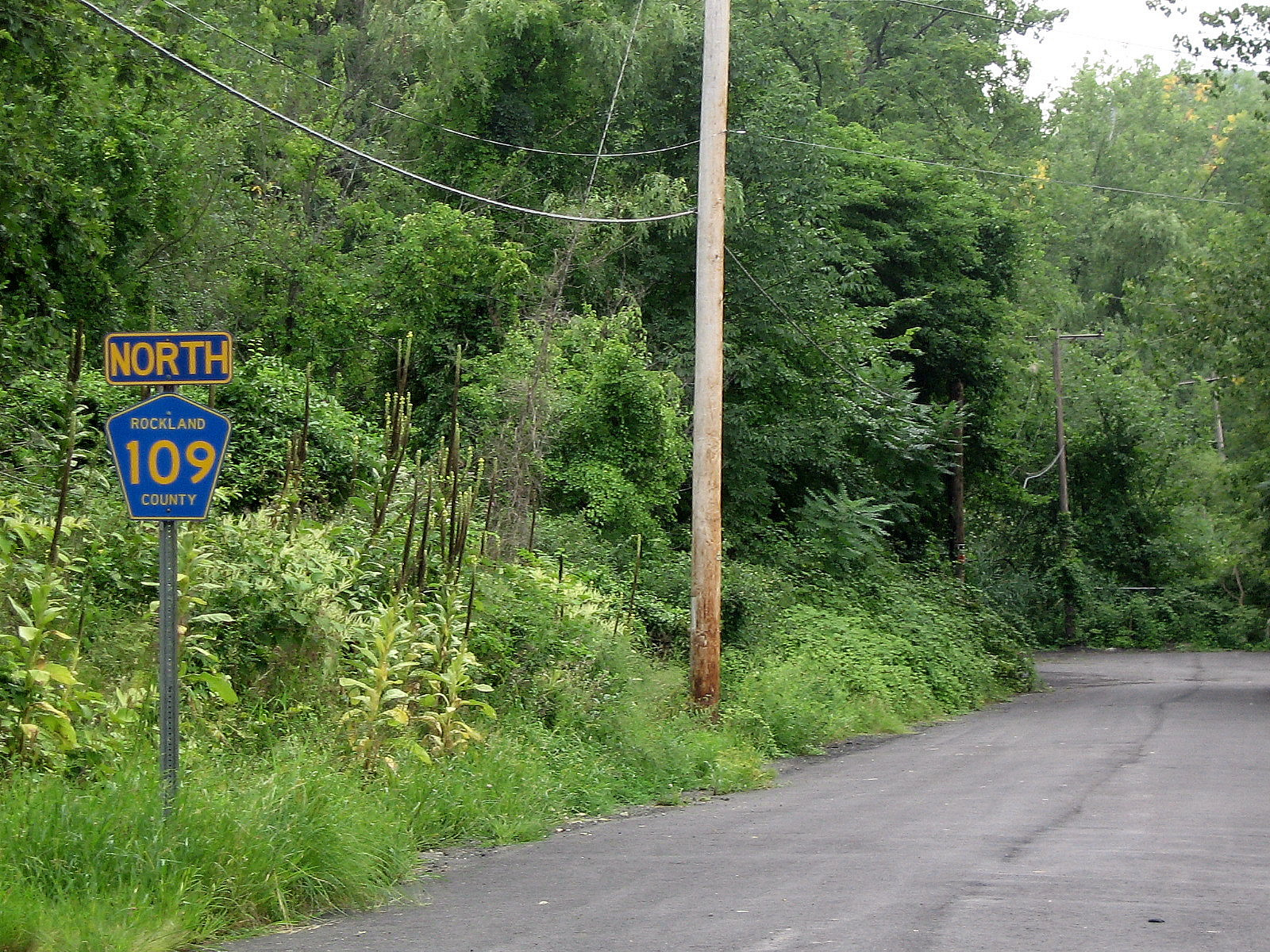
- CR 109's southern terminus at the dead end ahead despite the erroneous north marking above 109.

Highway names
- Interstates: Interstate X (I-X)
- US Highways: U.S. Route X (US X)
- State: New York State Route X (NY X)
- County: County Route X (CR X)

System links
- New York Highways; Interstate; US; State; Reference; Parkways

County routes in Rockland County, New York, are maintained by the Rockland County highway department and signed with the Manual on Uniform Traffic Control Devices-standard yellow-on-blue pentagon route marker. Most of the routes act as primary roads in the less developed areas and also serve to interconnect the various villages and hamlets of the county. Across the county, routes are numbered such that odd-numbered routes are north–south and increase in number from east to west, while even-numbered routes are east–west and increase from south to north.

There are 63 current routes and seven routes no longer maintained by the county, making for a total of 70 routes. The longest routes are CR 33, CR 23, and CR 80, all at over ten miles (16 km). The shortest route is CR 118A in Stony Point at 0.11 miles (0.18 km) long. There are also two routes that cross into Orange County and keep the same number from Rockland: CR 106 in Tuxedo and CR 72 in Sloatsburg. Also, several routes enter from New Jersey; two of these include CR 41 in Chestnut Ridge and CR 89 in Airmont. The northernmost route is CR 118 in Stony Point and the southernmost is CR 4 in Palisades.

== List of routes ==
Number	Length (mi)	Length (km)	Southern or western terminus	Northern or eastern terminus	Local names	Formed	Removed	Notes
CR 1	1.60	2.57	Piermont village line	South Nyack village line	River Road in Grand View-on-Hudson	—	—	
CR 4	—	—	New Jersey state line in Palisades	US 9W in Palisades	Closter Road in Palisades	—	—	
CR 5	3.69	5.94	CR 38 in Blauvelt	US 9W in Piermont	Tweed Boulevard, S. Tweed Boulevard and Park Road in Bluavelt South Nyack Piermont	—	—	
CR 8	1.93	3.11	New Jersey state line at Tappan	NY 340 in Sparkill	Old Tappan Road and Washington and Main streets	—	—	
CR 11	2.65	4.26	Orangeburg Road	Clarkstown town line	Greenbush Road in Orangetown	—	—	
CR 13	1.99	3.20	Maple Road in Valley cottage	CR 80 in congers	Kings Highway in Clarkstown	—	—	
CR 15	5.51	8.87	CR 8 in tappan	West Nyack Road in Clarkstown	Western highway S And N	—	—	
CR 16	0.64	1.03	CR 20 / CR 22	CR 17	Hunt Road in Orangetown	—	—	Former number.
CR 17	0.75	1.21	New Jersey state line	CR 20	Hog and Blaisdell roads in Orangetown	—	—	
CR 20	4.46	7.18	South Main Street	NY 303	Gilbert Avenue, Veterans Memorial Drive, and Orangeburg Road in Orangetown	—	—	
CR 22	1.06	1.71	CR 16 / CR 20	Dead end	Old Orangeburg Road in Orangetown	—	—	Former number.
CR 23	10.57 (Note: Mileage does not include the overlaps with CR 20 or CR 26)	17.01	New Jersey state line in Orangetown	CR 90 in Clarkstown	South Blue Hill Road, and Blue Hill, Convent, Blue Hill, Sickletown, Strawtown, and Ridge roads	—	—	
CR 23A	0.22	0.35	CR 23	Dead end	Old Blue Hill Road in Orangetown	—	—	
CR 26	2.83	4.55	CR 20	CR 15	Gilbert Avenue and Sickletown and Convent roads in Orangetown	—	—	
CR 27	2.71	4.36	CR 23	CR 33	Germonds Road in Clarkstown	—	—	
CR 28	2.01	3.23	NY 303	US 9W	Spruce Street and Clauseland Mountain and Old Mountain roads in Orangetown	—	—	
CR 29	2.94	4.73	CR 80	CR 90	North Main Street and Haverstraw Road in Clarkstown	—	—	
CR 30	1.63	2.62	New Jersey state line	CR 33 in Pearl River	Old Passack Road, West Washington Avenue & Central Avenue in Orangetown	—	—	
CR 33	12.36	19.89	CR 30 in Pearl River	CR 106 in Stony Point	Middletown, Little Tor, and Ramapo roads, Main Street, and Central Highway	—	—	Overlaps with US 202 between Little Tor Road and Main Street (Note: The overlap between CR 33 and US 202 exists only to connect the two segments of CR 33; it is maintained by NYSDOT.) Prior to 1970, portions of CR 33 were designated as the old route of NY 304.
CR 33A	0.30	0.48	CR 33	CR 46	Old Middletown Road in Clarkstown	—	—	
CR 35	4.10	6.60	CR 30 in Orangetown	CR 35A / CR 60 in Clarkstown	South Highland Avenue and Pascack Road	—	—	
CR 35A	3.35	5.39	NY 59 in Spring Valley	CR 80 in Clarkstown	New Clarkstown and West Clarkstown roads	—	—	Signed route also includes segment 2 of CR 52 (Note: As signed, CR 35A begins south of this junction at CR 35 and overlaps a short section of NY 59. The portion of the route south of NY 59 is officially designated CR 52.)
CR 35C	3.35	5.39	CR 35	CR 35A	Perlman Drive	—	—	
CR 36	0.65	1.05	CR 15	NY 303	Leber Road in Orangetown	—	—	
CR 37	0.27	0.43	Old Nyack Turnpike in Clarkstown	Pipetown Hill Road in Ramapo	Central Avenue	—	—	Unsigned
CR 38	1.36	2.19	CR 11	South Nyack village line	Bradley Parkway and Bradley Hill Road in Orangetown	—	—	
CR 41	1.53	2.46	New Jersey state line	NY 45	Red Schoolhouse Road in Chestnut Ridge	—	—	
CR 42	1.98	3.19	CR 33 in Clarkstown	CR 23 in Orangetown	Townline Road	—	—	
CR 44	0.58	0.93	CR 23	CR 15	Green Road in Clarkstown	—	—	
CR 46	1.08	1.74	CR 35	CR 33	Convent Road in Clarkstown	—	—	
CR 47	4.31	6.94	US 202 in Haverstraw	CR 108 in Stony Point	Thiells–Mount Ivy, Letchworth Village, Hammond, Willow Grove, Thiells, and Reservoir roads	—	—	
CR 49	0.37	0.60	CR 86	Dead end	Firemen's Memorial Drive in Ramapo	—	—	
CR 51	1.19	1.92	CR 80 in Ramapo	NY 45 in Ramapo	Summit Park and Sanatorium roads	—	—	
CR 52	1.66	2.67	CR 73 in Ramapo	CR 37 in Ramapo	Old Nyack Turnpike	—	—	
CR 52	0.14	0.23	CR 35	NY 59	Forman Drive in Clarkstown	—	—	Signed as part of CR 35A
CR 53	1.51	2.43	US 9W / US 202	CR 118	Buckberg Road in Stony Point	—	—	
CR 60	1.09	1.75	CR 35	CR 33	Smith Road in Clarkstown	—	—	
CR 64	2.80	4.51	CR 93 in Montebello	Maple Avenue in Ramapo	Montebello, Airmont, and Highview roads	—	—	
CR 65	1.61	2.59	CR 112	CR 118	Bulsontown Road in Stony Point	—	—	
CR 67	1.34	2.16	CR 80	—	McNamara Road on Wesley Hills–New Hempstead village line	—	—	
CR 68	0.34	0.55	CR 72	Sloatsburg village line	Eagle Valley Road in Ramapo	—	—	
CR 69	1.83	2.95	CR 65	CR 106	Cedar Flats Road in Stony Point	—	—	Unsigned
CR 69A	0.15	0.24	CR 69	Dead end	Queensboro Road in Stony Point	—	—	
CR 71	1.52	2.45	NY 45	CR 52	Hungry Hollow Road in Chestnut Ridge	—	—	
CR 72	1.83	2.95	Orange County line in Ramapo (becomes CR 72)	NY 17 in Ramapo	Sterling Mine Road	—	—	
CR 73	2.26	3.64	New Jersey state line	NY 59 / NY 306	East Saddle River Road in Ramapo	—	—	Formerly part of NY 306
CR 74	5.28	8.50	US 202 in Ramapo	CR 35A in Clarkstown	Viola and Eckerson roads	—	—	
CR 75	2.81	4.52	Ladentown Road in Ramapo	CR 98 in Haverstraw	Call Hollow Road	—	—	
CR 76	0.49	0.79	CR 33	South Main Street	Collyer Avenue in Clarkstown	—	—	
CR 80	12.93	20.81	US 202 in Ramapo	US 9W in Clarkstown	Grandview Avenue, New Hempstead Road, Main Street, and Congers and Lake roads	—	—	
CR 80A	0.07	0.11	CR 80	CR 85	Grandview Avenue in Montebello	—	—	
CR 81	6.24	10.04	CR 73 in Ramapo	US 202 in Wesley Hills	South Monsey, New County, College, Forshay, and Wilder roads	—	—	
CR 83	0.79	1.27	CR 98	CR 106	Blanchard Road in Stony Point	—	—	
CR 84	1.32	2.12	US 202	NY 306	Lime Kiln Road in Wesley Hills	—	—	
CR 85	5.70	9.17	New Jersey state line	US 202	Cherry Lane and Spook Rock Road in Ramapo	—	—	
CR 86	1.83	2.95	NY 306 in Pomona	NY 45 in Ramapo	Pomona Road	—	—	
CR 89	1.82	2.93	New Jersey state line in Airmont	CR 64 in Montebello	Airmont Road	—	—	
CR 90	0.81	1.30	CR 29 in Clarkstown	US 9W in Haverstraw	South Mountain Road	—	—	
CR 93	0.77	1.24	NY 59	CR 64	Hemion Road in Ramapo	—	—	
CR 94	3.67	5.91	CR 98 in Haverstraw	CR 108 in West Haverstraw	Letchworth Village Road, Suffern Lane, and Railroad Avenue	—	—	
CR 95	1.75	2.82	NY 59	Dead end	Torne Valley Road in Ramapo	—	—	
CR 97	0.91	1.46	Sloatsburg village line	Dead end	Stony Brook Road in Ramapo	—	—	
CR 98	4.03	6.49	CR 106 in Haverstraw	US 9W / US 202 in Stony Point	Gate Hill Road, Willow Grove Road, and Filors Lane	—	—	
CR 98A	0.14	0.23	CR 106	CR 98	Old Gate Hill Road in Stony Point	—	—	
CR 100	1.17	1.88	CR 47	US 9W / US 202	Washburn Lane in Stony Point	—	—	
CR 106	7.74	12.46	Orange County line in Haverstraw (becomes CR 106)	US 9W / US 202 in Stony Point	Kanawauke Road, Gate Hill Road, and Central Drive	—	—	
CR 108	4.13	6.65	CR 106 in Stony Point	CR 94 in Haverstraw	Old Route 210, Main Street and Grassy Point, River, and Beach roads	—	—	
CR 109	0.08	0.13	Dead end	CR 108	Gagan Road in West Haverstraw	—	—	
CR 110	0.82	1.32	US 9W / US 202	CR 108	Tomkins Avenue and Beach Road in Stony Point	—	—	
CR 112	1.37	2.20	CR 108	US 9W / US 202	Wayne Avenue in Stony Point	—	—	
CR 118	2.46	3.96	CR 65 / CR 69	US 9W / US 202	Mott Farm Road in Stony Point	—	—	
CR 118A	0.11	0.18	CR 118	US 9W / US 202	Gays Hill Road in Stony Point	—	—	
Former

== See also ==
- County routes in New York
