= New York State Route 45 =

State highway in Rockland County, New York, US

New York State Route 45
- Map of Rockland County in southeastern New York with NY 45 highlighted in red

Route information
- Maintained by NYSDOT
- Length: 8.57 mi (13.79 km)
- Existed: January 1, 1949–present

Major junctions
- South end: CR 73 at the New Jersey state line in Chestnut Ridge
- NY 59 in Spring Valley; Palisades Parkway in Pomona
- North end: US 202 / CR 47 / Palisades Parkway in Mount Ivy

Location
- Country: United States
- State: New York
- Counties: Rockland

Highway system
- New York Highways; Interstate; US; State; Reference; Parkways
← US 44	→ NY 46

New York State Route 45 (NY 45) is a north–south state highway in central Rockland County, New York, in the United States. It spans 8.57 miles (13.79 km) from the village of Chestnut Ridge at the New Jersey–New York border, where it becomes County Route 73 (CR 73) in Bergen County, New Jersey, to U.S. Route 202 (US 202) in the town of Haverstraw. Though an interchange does exist between NY 45 and the Palisades Interstate Parkway, the route has no access to the New York State Thruway.

NY 45 was originally designated as New York State Route 305 as part of the 1930 renumbering of state highways in New York. It was renumbered to New York State Route 94 in the early 1940s before becoming NY 45 on January 1, 1949.

== Route description ==
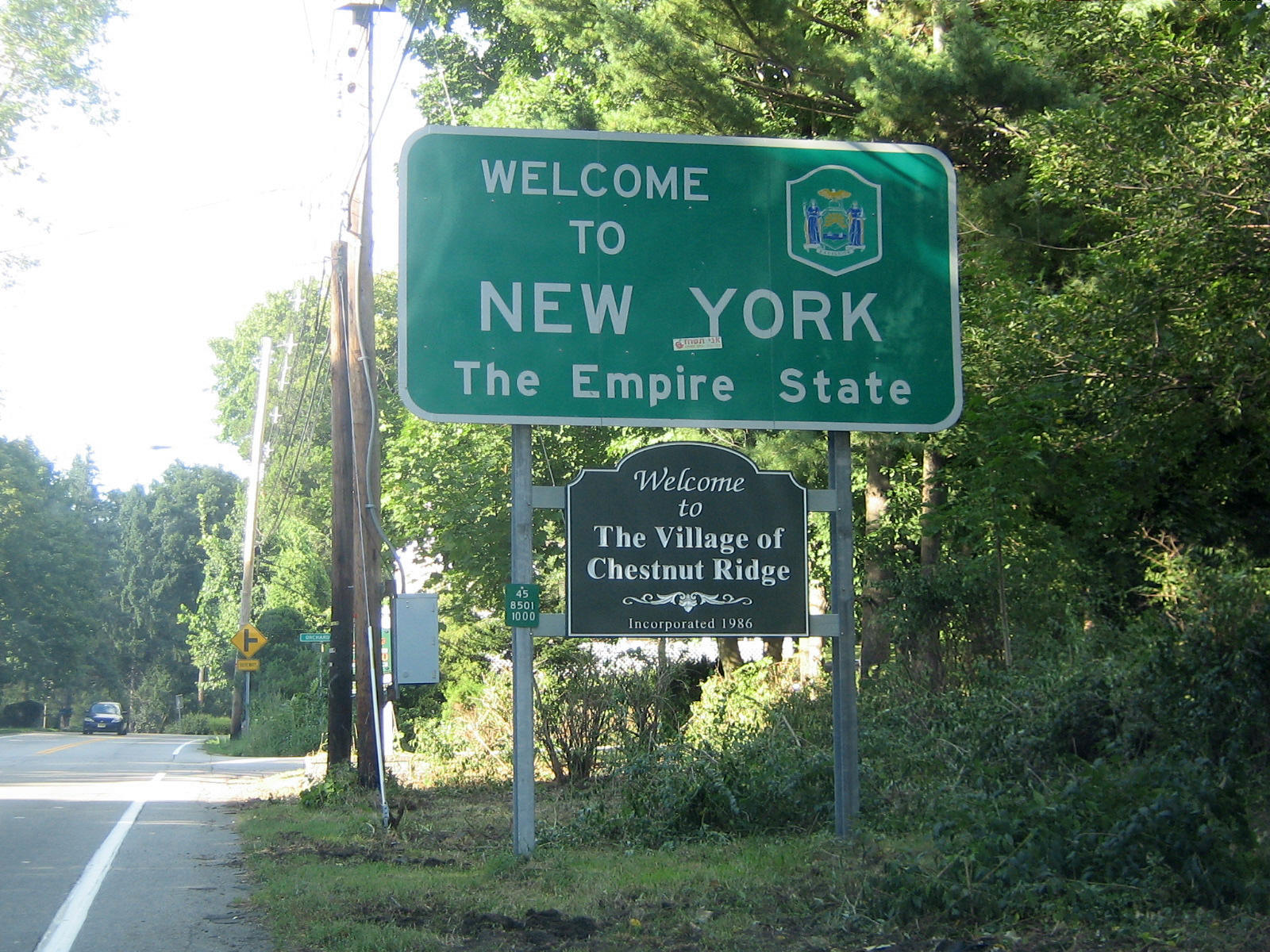
NY 45 begins here at the New York–New Jersey state line in Chestnut Ridge.

NY 45 begins at the New Jersey–New York border in Chestnut Ridge. Although the first NY 45 reassurance shield is a quarter-mile north of the state line, the reference marker below the "Welcome to New York" sign at the crossing indicates the beginning of NY 45.

NY 45 runs parallel to the small portion of the Garden State Parkway (GSP) that enters New York. Officially this portion is considered an extension of the New York State Thruway. While NY 45 never intersects the GSP, it provides a link to the parkway. South of the New Jersey border in Bergen County, CR 73 intersects the GSP, and in New York, NY 45 intersects CR 41, which intersects the parkway. Through Chestnut Ridge (where it is known as Chestnut Ridge Road, just as CR 73, its southern extension, is in New Jersey), it crosses the New York State Thruway.

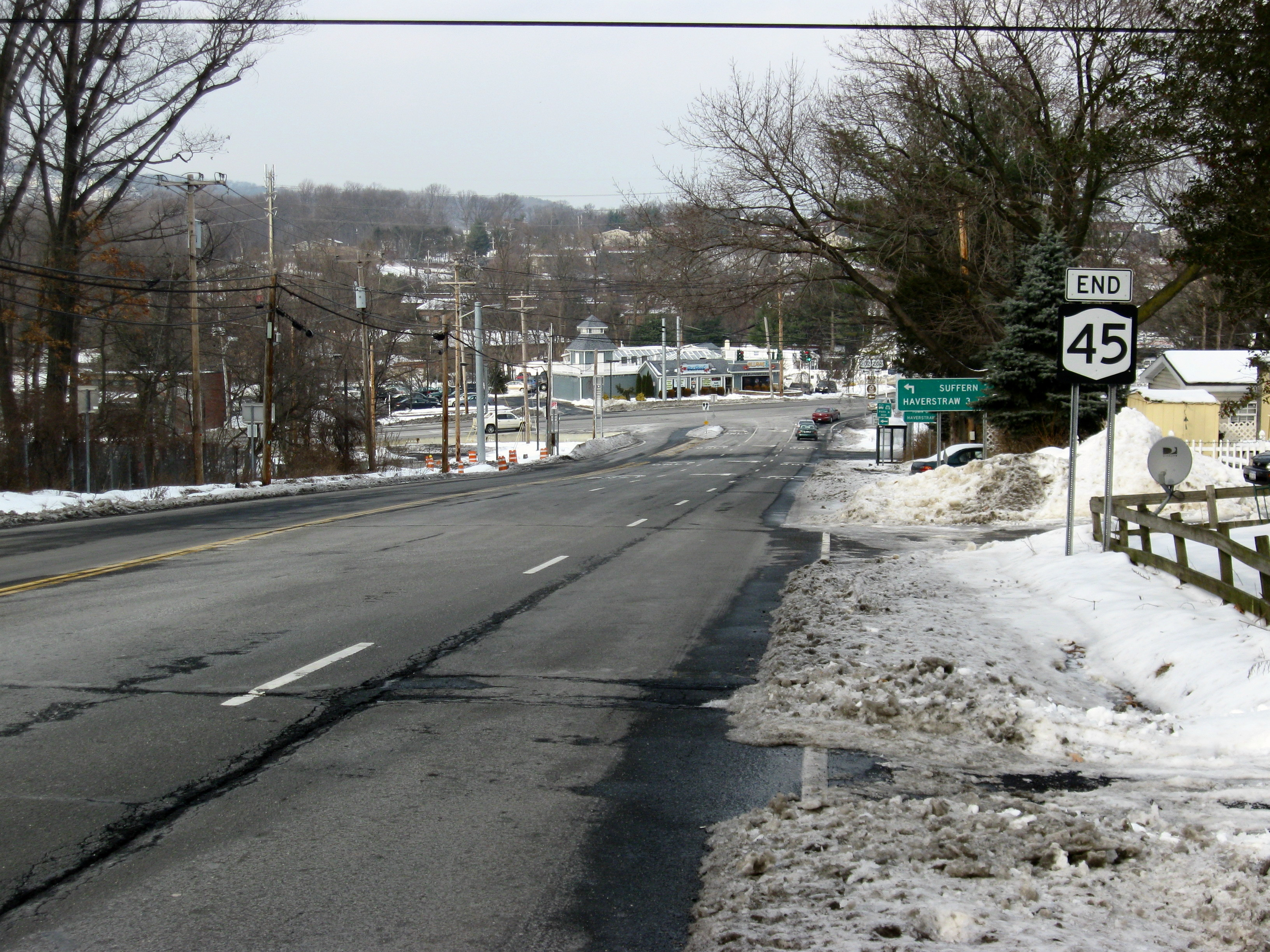
NY 45's northern terminus at US 202 in Mount Ivy near exit 13 of the Palisades Parkway.

Once it enters Spring Valley (where it is known locally first as South Main Street, then as North Main Street after it crosses its very busy intersection with NY 59), NY 45 continues northward through the downtown business district. Traffic here tends to pile up many times a day. After NY 45's intersection at Hillcrest with CR 74 (the location of several small shopping centers), traffic tends to ease up. North of there, NY 45 provides a link to the Hassidic Jewish community of New Square, although it never enters the village limits. At CR 80, NY 45 enters New Hempstead. Again the road becomes relatively quiet, but it begins to parallel the Palisades Interstate Parkway, until its intersection at exit 12 in Pomona. NY 45 quickly leaves Pomona and enters Mount Ivy. This is where NY 45 comes to its northern terminus at US 202. This area of US 202 is in downtown Mount Ivy, and exit 13 of the Palisades is just 0.1 miles (0.2 km) west of NY 45's northern terminus.

== History ==
What is now NY 45 was originally designated NY 305 as part of the 1930 renumbering of state highways in New York. At the same time, the portion of modern NY 305 north of Portville in Cattaraugus and Allegany counties was assigned NY 94, while the current NY 94 in Orange County was designated NY 45. The NY 305 and NY 94 designations were swapped in the early 1940s, placing NY 305 on its current alignment and NY 94 on what is now NY 45. NY 94 was then swapped again, this time for NY 45, on January 1, 1949, placing both routes on their modern routings.

In 1958, Ramapo town engineer Edwin Wallace noticed an increase in the amount of traffic passing through the village of Spring Valley. This led Wallace to propose a 5-mile (8.0 km) bypass of the village, starting at NY 59 in Monsey and ending at NY 45 in Hillcrest. Rockland County approved the proposed bypass two years later, and the plans were forwarded to the New York State Department of Transportation. In 1966, the Tri-State Transportation Commission released its long-term highway report for the area. The new study replaced the Spring Valley Bypass with the NY 45 expressway, a north–south bypass of Spring Valley connecting the Garden State Parkway to the Palisades Interstate Parkway. The road would serve a steadily growing area of commercial businesses along the NY 45 corridor. No action was taken on this proposal.

== Major intersections ==
The entire route is in Rockland County.

Location	mi	km	Destinations	Notes
Chestnut Ridge	0.00	0.00	CR 73 south (Chestnut Ridge Road) to G.S. Parkway south – Montvale	Continuation into New Jersey
Spring Valley	3.03	4.88	NY 59 to I-87 / I-287 / New York Thruway – Suffern, Nanuet	
Town of Ramapo	7.51	12.09	Palisades Parkway	Exit 12 on Palisades Parkway
Town of Ramapo	8.46	13.62	Palisades Parkway north	Southbound exit only
Town of Haverstraw	8.57	13.79	US 202 / CR 47 north / Palisades Parkway south – Pomona, Haverstraw	Northern terminus; southern terminus of CR 47; exit 13 on Palisades Parkway; hamlet of Mount Ivy
1.000 mi = 1.609 km; 1.000 km = 0.621 mi: Incomplete access
