= Central Nyack, New York =

Hamlet in New York, United States

Central Nyack (English pronunciation: /ˈnaɪæk/) is a hamlet in the Town of Clarkstown in Rockland County, New York, United States, approximately 20 miles north of New York City; it is north of Blauvelt; east of West Nyack; south of Valley Cottage, and west of the Village of Nyack. As an unincorporated community, governmental functions default to the town level (Clarkstown). The community is located at latitude 41.094 and longitude -73.95. The elevation is 62 feet. The neighborhood is in a mountain-view area, situated just north of Buttermilk Falls County Park and Stephen Rowe Bradley Town Park.

== History ==
Central Nyack grew up along the old Nyack Turnpike (present-day State Route 59). Anecdotally, travelers looking to avoid the toll on this road just outside the village of Nyack developed a path into the hills just south of the toll gate. This path eventually became Waldron Avenue, and a hamlet grew up around it. Most of the community was built between the 1880s and the 1920s. Outlying tracts were developed in the 1970s.

== Transportation ==
The community straddles State Route 59. Transport of Rockland county buses provide service along this route to Suffern, Spring Valley, Nyack, and the MetroNorth commuter rail station in Tarrytown. Clarkstown MiniTrans provides circulator buses within the community. The Central Nyack bus stop coordinates with Route D and stops at the Nanuet Train Station for commuters to ride the Pascack Valley Line into Hoboken, NJ. Hudson Link buses also serve the hamlet.

== Land use ==
The primary housing type is single-family detached dwellings. One subdivision, Ward Drive, has semi-attached units. There is one garden apartment complex. Several older single-family homes have been converted to multiple dwellings. There are apartment complexes located on Pine Street and Waldron Avenue, both built in the late 1960s and early 1970s.

There is highway commercial use along State Route 59. There is a small business district located at West Broadway and Waldron Avenue; this area no longer contains any businesses as of the mid-1990s. The community center and fire station are also located here.

A shopping plaza was built on the wooded area north of Route 59 and east of Route 303 in the late 1980s which contains a supermarket and several restaurants.

There is no significant industry in the hamlet.

The area abuts Buttermilk Falls County Park to the south. This park is largely undeveloped, with a small parking area and three improved hiking trails. Wildlife include white-tailed deer, chipmunk, rabbit, and nuthatch. There are no schools located in the community.

== Education ==
The western portion of Central Nyack is part of the Clarkstown Central School District. Students here attend West Nyack Elementary School, Felix V. Festa Middle School and Clarkstown Senior High School South.

The eastern portion of Central Nyack is part of the Nyack Public Schools system. Students here attend Valley Cottage Elementary School, Nyack Middle School and Nyack High School.

== Demographics ==
Central Nyack is composed of Block Group 3 of Rockland County Tract 111.02.

2000 U.S. census data gives:

- Population: 1,845
- Non-Hispanic White: 31%
- Non-Hispanic Black: 40%
- Non-Hispanic Asian: 8%
- Hispanic: 11%
- Other: 10%
- Housing Units: 574
- Rented Units: 39%
- Owner-Occupied Units: 61%
