= Bear Mountain Compact =

The Bear Mountain Compact is an unofficial agreement among members of the New York State legislature in which they agree to keep whatever happens in the state capital in Albany, such as extramarital affairs and other embarrassing behavior, secret.

== Origin ==
In a 2003 article for New York magazine, Michael Tomasky traced the secrecy in Albany "back to the days [in the 19th and early 20th centuries] when the Democratic hotel was the De Witt Clinton, the Republican hotel was the Ten Eyck, and one didn't pry too deeply into who was sleeping where."

== Explanation of the term ==
In their book, From Rocky to Pataki: Character and Caricatures in New York Politics (1998), Hy Rosen and Peter Slocum wrote that the "so-called Bear Mountain Compact dictated that anything that went on north of Bear Mountain wasn't ever discussed back home in New York City." In The New York Times, however, Al Baker associated the Bear Mountain Compact with the Bear Mountain Bridge, writing, "For years, the joke has been that the mostly male lawmakers and their hangers-on have clung to a secret code known as the Bear Mountain compact, whereby any liaisons with interns or young staff members that occur north of Bear Mountain Bridge, which spans the Hudson River between Orange and Westchester Counties, are not spoken about in the home districts in New York City or elsewhere."

One definition of the "Bear Mountain Compact" reads, "Open secrets stay secret."
