= Bear Mountain Inn =

- U.S. National Register of Historic Places
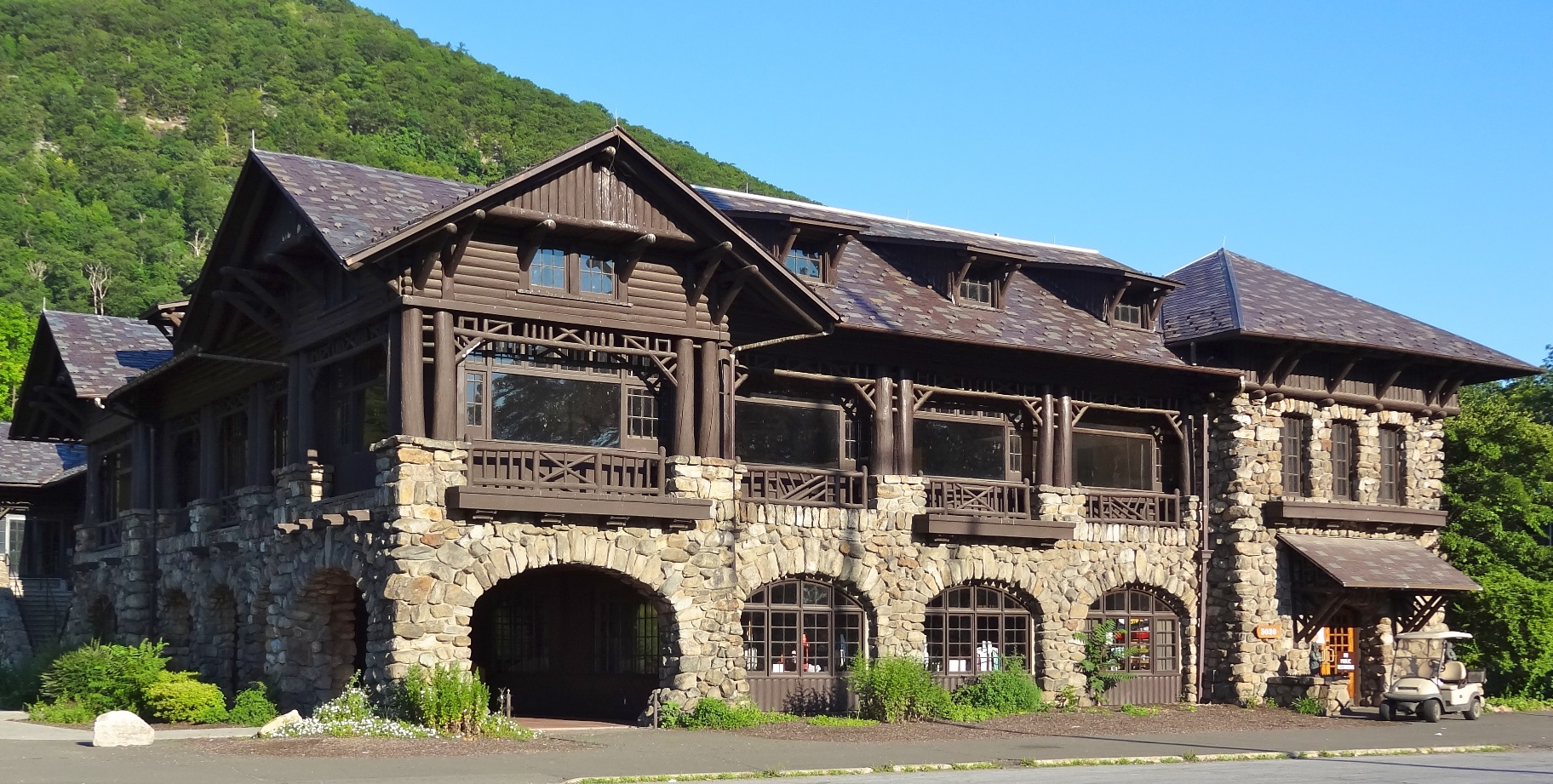
- Viewed from the east in 2012, shortly after renovation

- Location within New York Location within the United States
- Location: Seven Lakes Drive, Bear Mountain, New York
- Coordinates: 41°18′47″N 73°59′25″W
- Built: 1915
- Architect: Tooker and Marsh
- Architectural style: Rustic
- NRHP reference No.: 02001048
- Added to NRHP: September 20, 2002

The Bear Mountain Inn is a 1915 hotel, restaurant and spa owned by the Palisades Interstate Park Commission and located in Bear Mountain State Park just south of the Bear Mountain Bridge in Rockland County, New York. It is now called the Bear Mountain Inn & Conference Center and features the 1915 Cafe and the Bear Mountain Trading Company gift store. A renovation was completed in April 2012.

== History ==
The building is among the earliest examples of the type of Rustic park lodges common in state and national parks. Construction required two years at a cost variously reported as $100,000 and $150,000. It was designed by the New York City firm of Tooker & Marsh in a style strongly influenced by the Adirondack Great Camps.

Stone used in the foundations, wall facades and the two remarkably large fireplaces, was obtained from old walls on the properties acquired for Bear Mountain State Park. Chestnut timber used for framing, certain trim, siding and floor covering, was also obtained from local park lands and milled on site. Despite appearances to the contrary, the building's basic framework is constructed of steel.

The 1915 cellar contained an electric lighting plant that was also planned to furnish power for an escalator from the excursion boat landing on the Hudson River to the plateau on which the inn stands. The ground floor included a luncheon counter while on the second floor veranda "moderately priced table d'hote" meals were sold. The main dining room offered "service equal to any metropolitan restaurant." According to a New York Times article published in June 1915, "There are no windows or doors. When cool weather comes, the upper floor is to be inclosed [sic] in glass".

In 1922-23 the building became a year-round facility with steam heat and enclosed windows. The aim was in part to make it a center for winter sports. Between the 1930s and 1980s changes to the floor plan were made and some historic details and decorative motifs were concealed or lost, and much of the original rustic furniture was removed. A renovation aimed to restore some of these details.

When it became used for overnight accommodations, the third floor was initially remodeled as a dormitory. Later, individual guest rooms were installed with shared bath facilities. In 1975, individual bathrooms were installed as part of a larger renovation.

At various times during the 1930s and 40s, the Brooklyn Dodgers baseball team, the New York Giants football team and the New York Knickerbockers basketball team made the inn and adjacent athletic facilities their training headquarters. Also during this period, entertainment headliners included Harry James and Tommy Dorsey, and some believe Kate Smith wrote her 1931 theme song "When the Moon Comes Over the Mountain" while at the inn. If so, the mountain in question might be Anthony's Nose which lies to the east across the Hudson River.

Madame Chiang Kai-shek spent two weeks in seclusion at one of the outlying lodges of the Bear Mountain Inn in the spring of 1943, meeting with Wendell L. Willkie there on April 25 before proceeding to the White House for a brief stay.

Following the outbreak of World War II, the park commission gave up direct management of the hotel and it was offered as a concession. Terminal Operating Corp. operated the hotel from 1941 until 1965, when it was taken over by Restaurant Associates Inc. As of 1991, ARA Leisure Services operated the inn. A similar contract was announced in December 2008 with Guest Services Inc. of Fairfax, Virginia.

The building was added to The National Register of Historic Places on September 20, 2002. It was also inducted into Historic Hotels of America, an official program of the National Trust for Historic Preservation, in 2016.

== Renovation project ==
A $12 million renovation by H3 HardyCorp, to restore the inn's "original rustic splendor", announced by the park commission in 2005, would require closing the building to the public for 18 months. Bear Mountain Inn had been closed for renovations since about 2005. Media reports on this topic from time to time were somewhat contradictory. A brief note in The New York Times on November 29, 2009, concerned a high-end charity fund-raising event for the project and said renovation was to begin in 2010. Reports since then put the expected cost across a fairly wide range, while accounts of some other details have also varied. In April 2009, a comparatively detailed report in a local Orange County media outlet put costs at $15 million, indicating work had been ongoing.

A public lounge area which had included the building's iconic second-floor fireplace has been reconfigured as a restaurant and catering operation. On February 18, 2012 the Bear Mountain Inn was to be reopened after a six-year closure.

For additional information, see Chapter 3: Bear Mountain, in Gottlock & Gottlock's 2007 book.

== In popular culture ==
The inn appears in the 1999 film At First Sight where it is called "Bear Mountain Inn & Spa".
