= Raymond H. Torrey =

American environmentalist

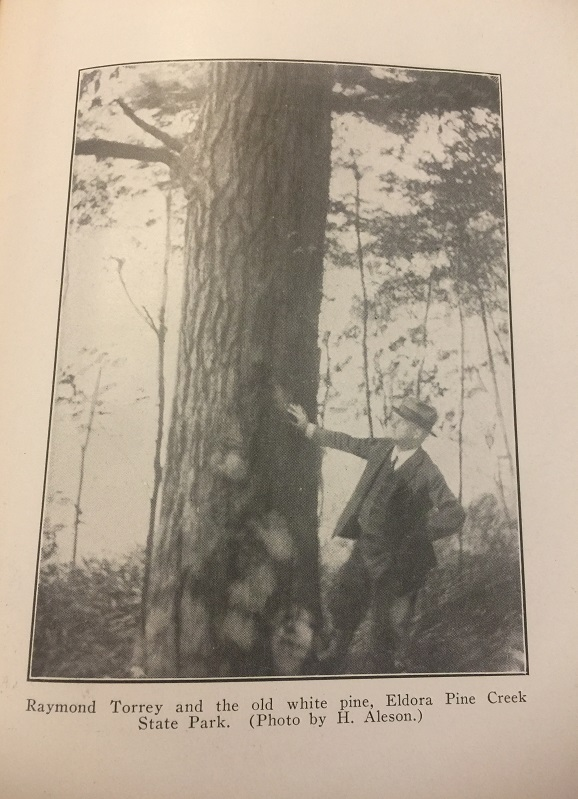
Raymond H. Torrey at what is now known by Pine Lake State Park

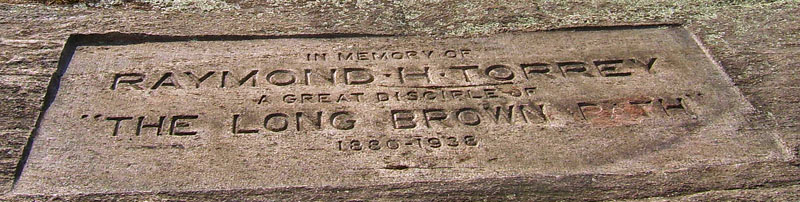
Memorial to Torrey on the summit of Long Mountain in Harriman State Park.

Raymond Hezekiah Torrey (July 15, 1880 – July 15, 1938) was the author of weekly columns, Outings and The Long Brown Path in the New York Evening Post in the 1920s and 1930s. The column played a major role in the development of the 2,100-mile (3,400 km) Appalachian Trail, the Long Path and the popularity of hiking generally. He was a founding member of the New York–New Jersey Trail Conference and one of the authors of the first edition of the New York Walk Book. He had extensive scientific knowledge, writing about everything from the short-billed marsh wren to marine fossils and lichens; he could identify over 700 plants. He was secretary of the Association for the Preservation of the Adirondacks, and also secretary of the American Scenic and Historic Preservation Society.

== Early life ==
Born in Georgetown, Massachusetts, where his father was a sea captain, he began a career in journalism in newspapers in the Berkshires first, but soon moved to New York City. In 1903 he started at the New York American, then moved to the Tribune and finally the Evening Post (today the New York Post) in 1918. He became involved in the New York hiking scene at a time when the forests and mountains of the Hudson Highlands were relatively unknown but interest in the outdoors was increasing and city hiking clubs were coming into existence.

== The Long Brown Path ==
In the early 1920s Torrey developed a weekly outdoor column for the Post, called the Long Brown Path which was named for a line in Walt Whitman's "Song of the Open Road". Major William A. Welch, General Manager of the Palisades Interstate Park Commission, was interested in creating hiking trails in Bear Mountain-Harriman State Parks, but was lacking funds. Welch suggested that Torrey use his influential column to help organize New York metropolitan area hiking clubs into a volunteer trail-building confederation; this led to the creation of the Palisades Interstate Park Trail Conference, a precursor of the NY/NJTC.

Torrey not only wrote the columns, he organized and coordinated the resulting volunteers and did plenty of route-scouting and trail building himself.

The column was very popular: along with news of the clubs and their trails, it included a listing of hikes, as many as 20 or 30 weekly. He also used the column as a "bully pulpit", railing against litter, championing environmental causes, giving notice of upcoming conservation bills in New York and New Jersey, and organizing letter-writing campaigns in support of reforestation measures and proposals for the creation of new parks.

== The Appalachian Trail ==
In 1922 Torrey publicized a proposal by forester Benton MacKaye to build a 2,100-mile (3,400 km) trail from Maine to Georgia (subsequently named the Appalachian Trail or AT) with a story under a full-page banner headline reading "A Great Trail from Maine to Georgia!"; the idea was quickly adopted by the new Trail Conference as their main project.

Working with volunteers organized by J. Ashton Allis of the Trail Conference, Torrey helped blaze the first 6 miles (10 km) of the AT running from the Ramapo River to Fingerboard Mountain. By January 4, 1924, the 20-mile (32 km) stretch from the Hudson to the Ramapo River was complete. On November 18 of that year, he worked with the Tramp and Trail Club on what he dubbed a "Speed Special", clearing and blazing a 20-mile (32 km) section through Sterling Forest, New York.

The effort involved much more than the physical effort of building and blazing trails— complex negotiations with property owners were required as well, particularly east of the Hudson where no established system of hiking trails existed. By 1929, with the help of New Jersey state park officials, a 43-mile (69 km) section from the Delaware River to High Point along the Kittatinny Ridge was completed. Two years later, 160 miles (260 km) of the AT, from the Delaware River to Kent, Connecticut, was in place.

== Confrontation with Robert Moses ==
Later that year, he tangled with Robert Moses, a onetime ally who had named him secretary of the New York State Parks Council, a forerunner to the current New York State Office of Parks, Recreation and Historic Preservation, in order to help establish Letchworth State Park. Torrey opposed the route Moses wanted for the Northern State Parkway along Long Island's central glacial moraine. He had arranged for the reprinting of an article sharing this view in the ASHPS newsletter, which enraged Moses.

On September 12, Moses learned that Torrey had been providing information about Parks Council meetings, information that was available to the public in any event, to an attorney for wealthy North Shore landowners similarly opposed to the road project. He called Torrey to his office, where the council's finance committee was meeting, and berated him for this and the newsletter article, which he considered serious breaches of trust.

Torrey stood firm and defended both actions. When Moses responded to Torrey's telling him he had no right to tell him what he could and could not print by saying "Goddamn you! What do you mean by doing something like that?", Torrey, who had many Jewish friends, lost his temper and said "You big noisy kike; you can't talk to me like that." Moses attempted to choke him and had to be pulled off Torrey by other members of the committee; he threw a smoking stand at Torrey afterwards.

While Torrey apologized for the incident (and Moses did not), he eventually resigned from the Parks Council, a move which ultimately gave Moses control of that body.

== Death and legacy ==
Torrey died of a heart attack on his 58th birthday, stunning the hiking community. The NY/NJTC soon found that it took a committee to do the work he alone had carried out. A memorial was placed on Long Mountain in Harriman State Park, which had one of his favorite views, reading "In Memory of Raymond H. Torrey, A Great Disciple of the Long Brown Path, 1880-1938." His ashes were scattered to the winds there in a brief ceremony.
