= Teatown Lake Reservation =

Nature reserve and education center in New York

Coordinates: 41.212°N 73.833°W

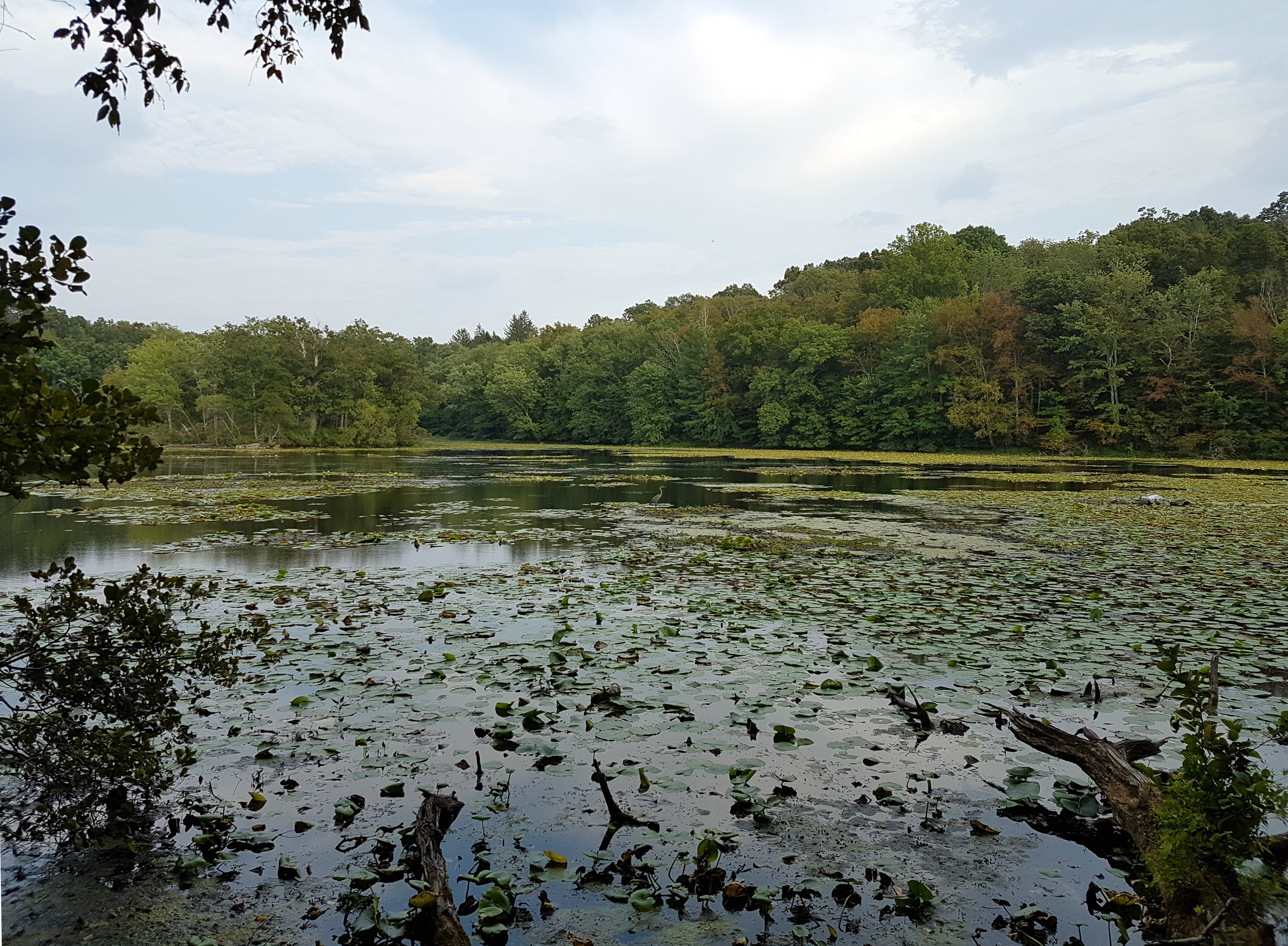
- Teatown Lake in September 2016
- Formation: June 20, 1969
- Type: Nonprofit Nature preserve
- Headquarters: 1600 Spring Valley Road, Ossining, NY; 1,000 acres (400 ha)
- Members: New York–New Jersey Trail Conference; Land Trust Alliance; Federated Conservationists of Westchester County; Association of Nature Center Administrators; Environmental Consortium of Hudson Valley Colleges and Universities
- Website: www.teatown.org

Teatown Lake Reservation is a nonprofit nature preserve and environmental education center in Westchester County, New York, U.S., located in the towns of Ossining, Yorktown, Cortlandt, and New Castle. The reservation includes an 1,000-acre (4.0 km^{2}) nature preserve and education center, visited annually by around 25,000 people.

Known by locals simply as "Teatown", the organization works to conserve biodiversity, teach ecology and promote nature-friendly living. Located in the Lower Hudson Valley's Hudson Highlands, Teatown Lake Reservation conserves open space, educates about the environment, sustaining the diversity of wildlife and plants.

== History ==
Teatown Lake Preservation began in 1962, when 245 acres were donated by the family of Gerard Swope Sr. (former Chairman of GE) to the Brooklyn Botanic Garden. The Teatown Lake Reservation was formed in 1963 and has been managed by staff since.

Teatown provides conservation in the bioregion. Through sponsorship of the Hudson Hills and Highlands Environmental Leaders Learning Alliance (ELLA), Teatown provides assistance to civic leaders in crafting practical solutions to environmental issues and helps land owners and residents become more nature friendly.

In 2008, Teatown and the New York–New Jersey Trail Conference established a partnership on a new effort to provide assistance to local trail programs in Putnam and Westchester counties. Launched in July 2008, the "Hudson Hills and Highlands Community Trail Program" is part of the New York–New Jersey Trail Conference's larger effort to expand its reach east of the Hudson River from New York City to Columbia County. For nearly 100 years, New York–New Jersey Trail Conference volunteers have helped public agencies provide safe and responsible access to open space from New York City west to the Delaware Water Gap and north to the Catskills.

From 1980 on, Teatown leased its property from the Brooklyn Botanic Garden. On May 18, 2018 the Garden formally transferred ownership of the property to Teatown through an easement, a move intended to protect the land from any future development and to preserve its future autonomy and mission. Per Kevin Carter, the executive director of Teatown, the ownership transfer was done via mutual consent of both parties because "When the lease expired, the land could have been sold or a portion of it sold," and that it was the garden's "...intent to hold this land until Teatown had grown up as an organization. People are still living that remember the spirit of the original transaction and lease, but that won't always be the case."

== Environmental education ==
Teatown teaches ecology to encourage responsible interaction with nature. About 25,000 people come each year to attend an education program, visit the Nature Center, hike its trails, and tour Wildflower Island, a 2-acre (8,100 m^{2}) island sanctuary located within Teatown Lake that is home to over 230 native and endangered species of wildflowers.

Teatown's educators offer a variety of environmental education programs, including weekend family and adults only programs, multi-week children's series, school programs, school vacation camps, a summer camp, and special programs for Scouts and others organizations.

Over 10,000 participants annually attend one or more such educational programs, including nearly 6,000 school children and 700 summer campers. Annually, over 15,000 hikers traverse Teatown's 15 miles (24 km) of trails that span fields, mixed forests, lakes, streams, swamps and farm land. Teatown volunteers participate in the "Great Backyard Bird Count" sponsored by the Audubon Society each winter.

Teatown's Nature Center is a source of wildlife knowledge and home to a variety of amphibians, birds of prey, mammals and reptiles. The Nature Center also houses a store with books and small gifts. The Center often hosts gallery shows of art by area painters and photographers related to environmental themes.

== Land stewardship ==
Teatown Lake Reservation serves as a 1,000-acre (4.0 km^{2}) oasis for many of the plants and animals that inhabit the Hudson Hills and Highlands. Teatown expanded its Environmental Stewardship Program to manage the flora and fauna living in the preserve for the benefit of nature conservation and regional ecological health. What began as a gift of 190 acres (0.77 km^{2}) in 1963 has more than quintupled in size, including many different habitats, from aquatic and wetland locations to upland woods and meadows.

== Annual festivals ==
Teatown conducts two annual celebrations that are open to the public: the Hudson River EagleFest and the Plant Sale. The EagleFest takes place in February each year, when winter conditions make eagles easier to spot as they search for prey on the Hudson River. The EagleFest offers visitors live raptor demonstrations in tents at Westchester County's Croton Point Park.

The annual Nature Friendly Plant Sale is held in the tradition of the Cliffdale Farm legacy of Teatown and is a source for local hardy and diverse garden plants. The plant sale takes place each spring.
