= Darlington Schoolhouse =

- U.S. National Register of Historic Places
- New Jersey Register of Historic Places
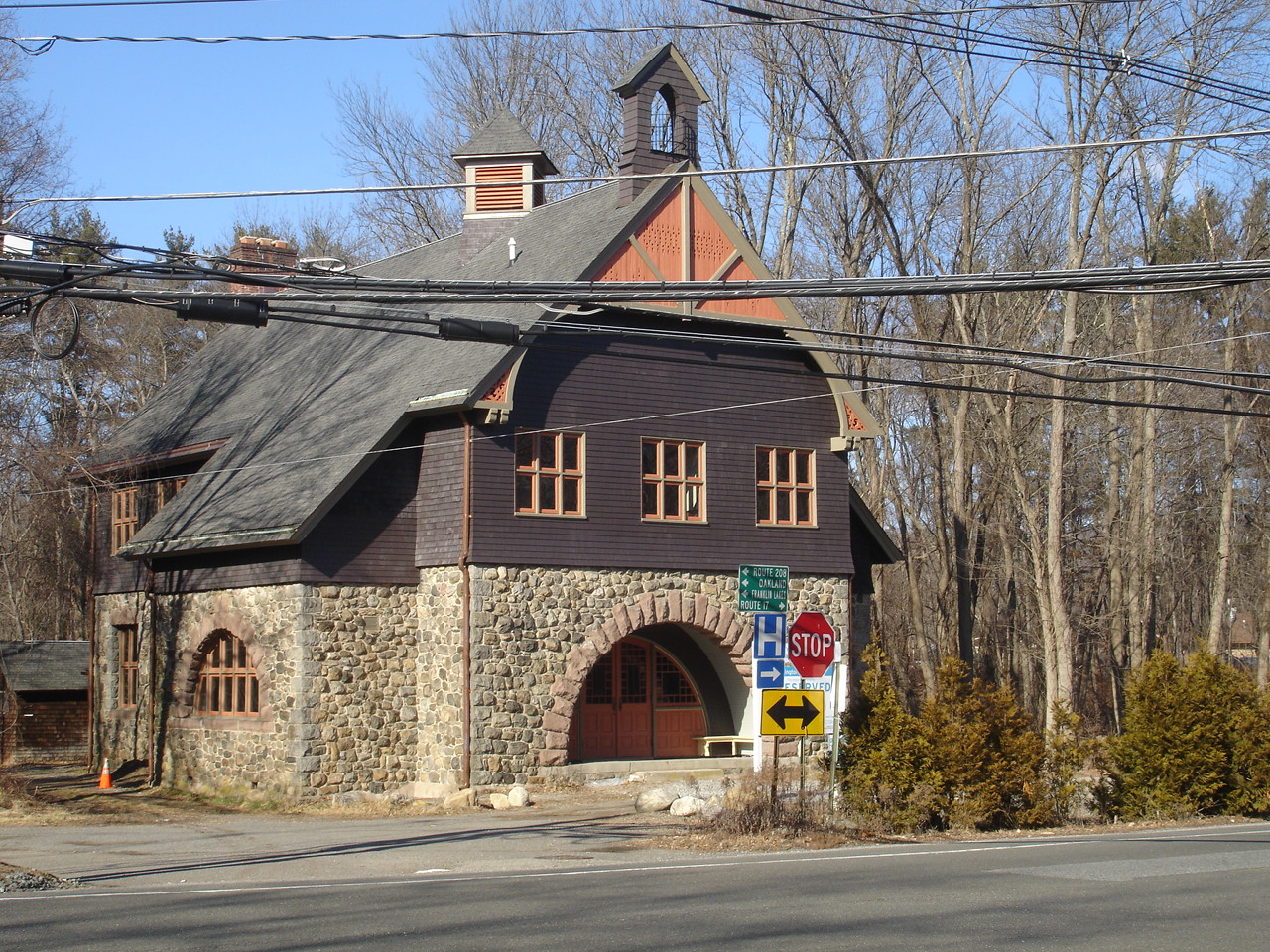

- Location within Bergen County, New Jersey Location within New Jersey Location within the United States
- Location: 600 Ramapo Valley Road, Mahwah, New Jersey
- Coordinates: 41°4′46″N 74°11′4″W
- Area: 3.4 acres (1.4 ha)
- Built: 1891; 135 years ago
- Architect: Dudley Newton
- Architectural style: Shingle Style, Romanesque, Stick/Eastlake
- NRHP reference No.: 08000175
- NJRHP No.: 4292

Significant dates
- Added to NRHP: March 14, 2008
- Designated NJRHP: December 20, 2007

The Darlington Schoolhouse is located in the Darlington section of Mahwah, Bergen County, New Jersey, United States. Theodore Havemeyer, with assistance from Alfred Darling, financed the building and hired Dudley Newton to design and oversee construction. The schoolhouse was built in 1891 and added to the National Register of Historic Places on March 14, 2008. The first floor of the schoolhouse consists of a large room in which grades one through eight were taught. The second floor served as a community hall, and as a chapel used by members of the Dutch Reformed Church at Romopock. The schoolhouse has been restored by the New York–New Jersey Trail Conference, for use as its permanent headquarters.

== See also ==
- National Register of Historic Places listings in Bergen County, New Jersey
- List of museums in New Jersey
