= Dudley Newton =

American architect (1845–1907)

- Born: 1845; Newport, Rhode Island
- Died: 1907 (aged 61–62); Newport, Rhode Island
- Occupation: Architect

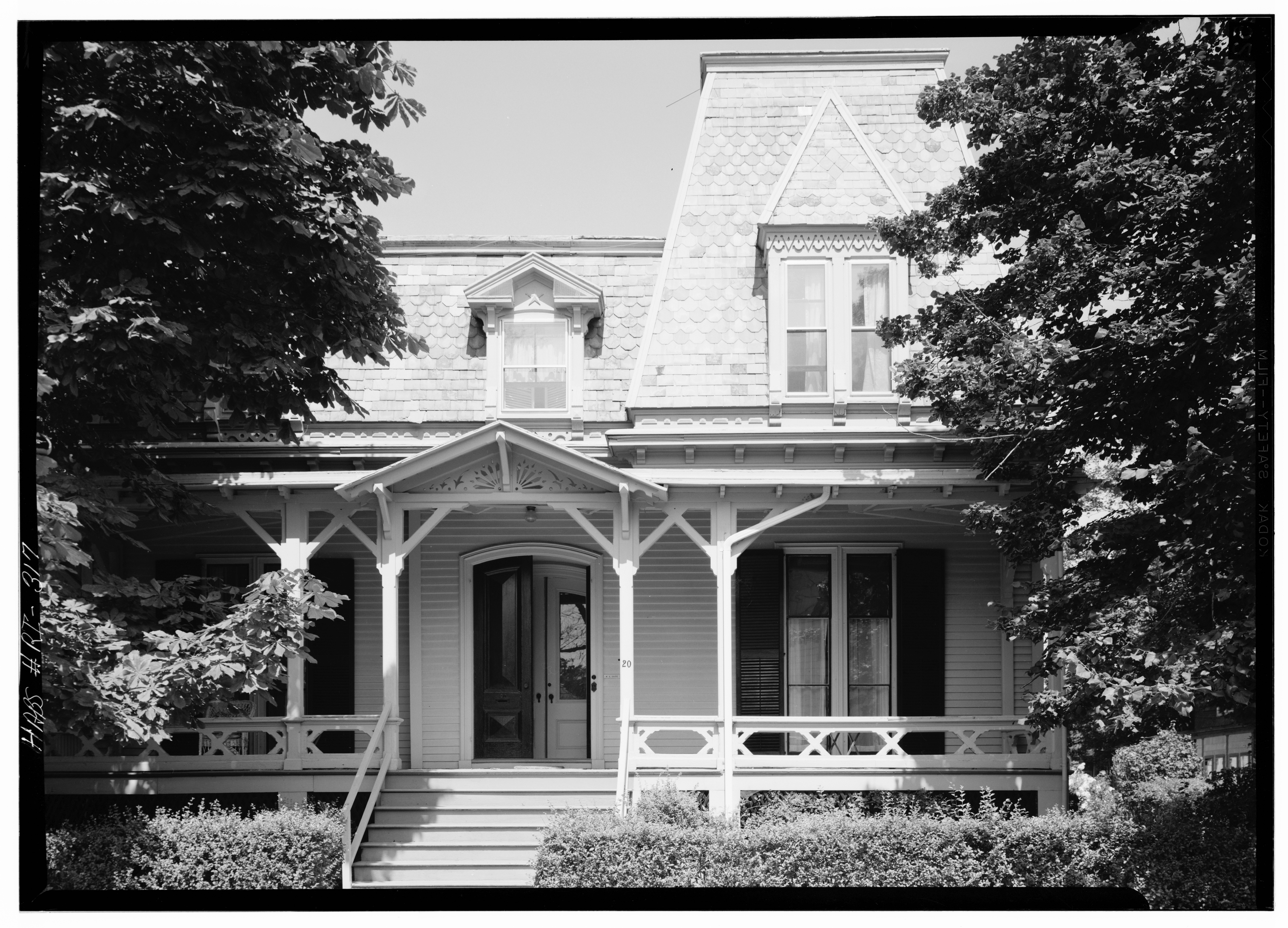
William Birkhead House, Newport, 1872.

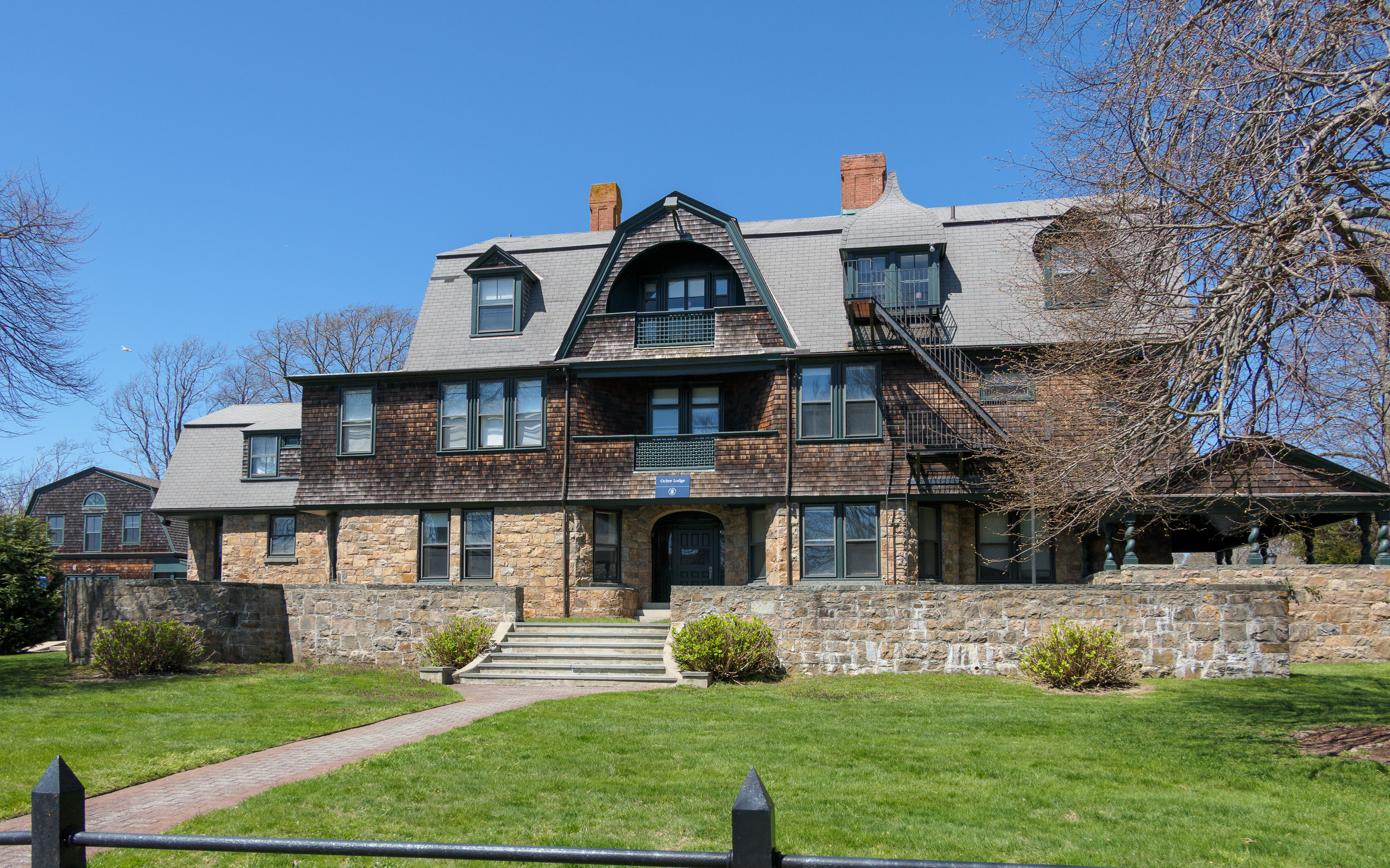
J. H. Eldredge House, Newport, 1882.

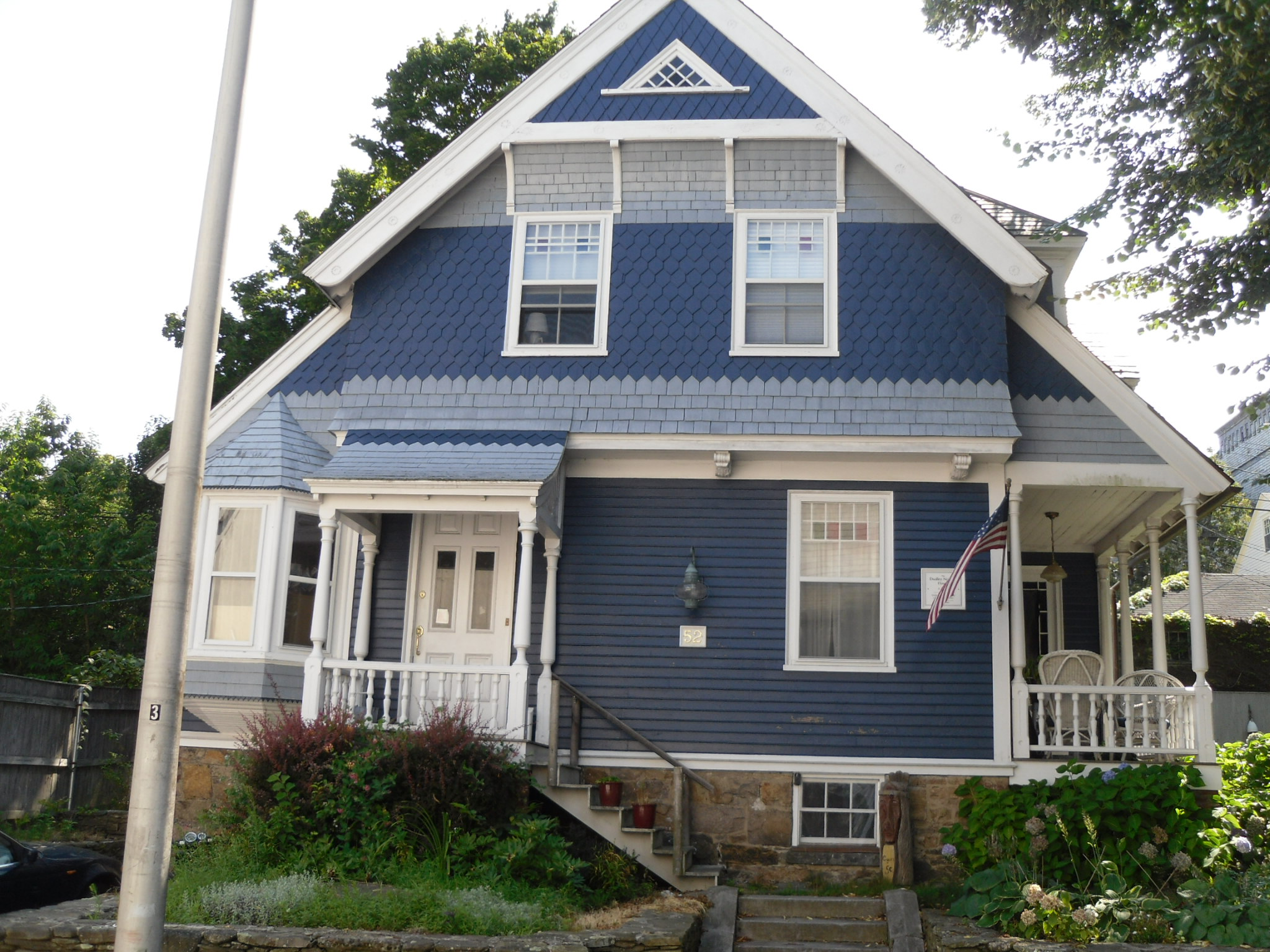
Dudley Newton House, Newport, 1882.

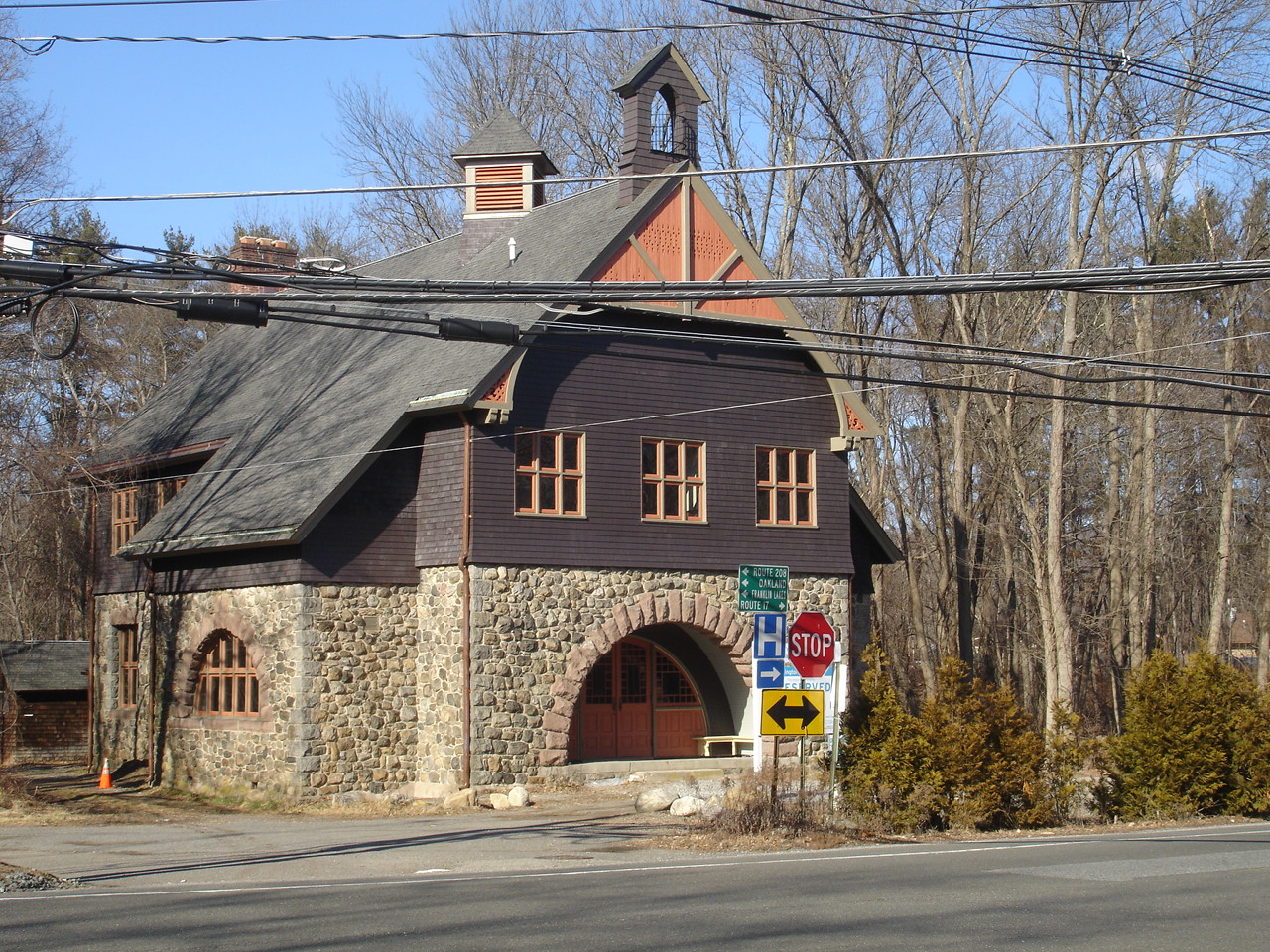
Darlington Schoolhouse, Mahwah, 1891.

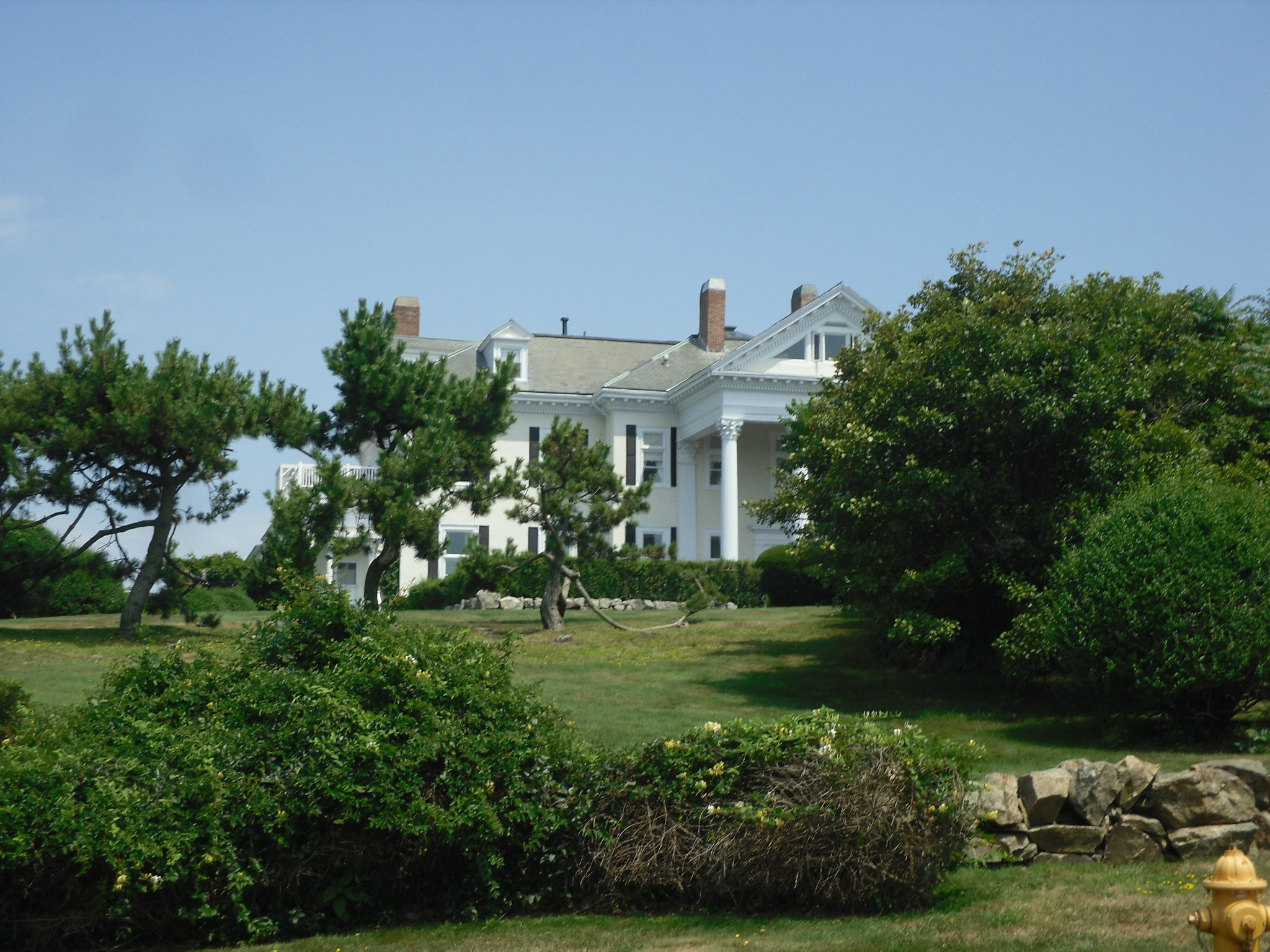
Crossways, Newport, 1896.

Dudley Newton (1845-1907) was an American architect from Newport, Rhode Island.

Newton was born in Newport in 1845. After an education in the Newport public schools until the age of 15, Newton began to study with George C. Mason, Newport's first professional architect. Newton left Mason and opened his office in 1866. In 1868 he removed to New York City, and was practicing there by 1870. That same year he moved back to Newport, where he remained for the rest of his career, apparently retiring around the turn of the century.

In 1876, Newton married Mary Elizabeth Bailey, and the couple had three children.

== Architectural works ==
- Central Police Station, Market Sq., Newport, RI (1866–67) - Demolished.
- Thames Street M. E. Church, 390 Thames St., Newport, RI (1866) - Altered.
- Dr. James R. Newton Office, 394 Thames St., Newport, RI (1867) - Built for the architect's father.
- Gull Rock (Robert V. McKim House), 8 Yznaga Ave., Newport, RI (1870) - Demolished 1972.
- Benjamin Rhodes House, 45 Everett St., Newport, RI (1871–72)
- Jacob Cram House (Cram-Sturtevant House), 438 Abe Meyer Ln., Middletown, RI (1871–72)
- William Birkhead House, 20 Catherine St., Newport, RI (1872)
- Charles C. Churchill House, 62 Ayrault St., Newport, RI (1872)
- Dudley Newton Studio, 20 Bellevue Ave., Newport, RI (1872) - Newton's office.
- Fairview (John W. Downing House), 34 Malbone Rd., Newport, RI (1873–74)
- Newport Gas Co. Building, 181 Thames St., Newport, RI (1874) - Demolished.
- Henry H. Swinburn House, 97 Rhode Island Ave., Newport, RI (1875–76)
- Sarah C. Woolsey House, 93 Rhode Island Ave., Newport, RI (1875)
- Rectory for Emmanuel Episcopal Church, 3 Bellevue Ct., Newport, RI (1877)
- William H. Smith House, 135 Pelham St., Newport, RI (1878)
- Fire Station No. 2, Bridge & 3rd Sts., Newport, RI (1880) - Demolished.
- Charles Pinard House, 49 Annandale Rd., Newport, RI (1880–81)
- Convent for St. Mary R. C. Church, 398 Thames St., Newport, RI (1880) - Moved to its current site in 1991.
- Sunnylea (Charles F. Chickering House), 541 Bellevue Ave., Newport, RI (1881–82)
- Julia H. Eldridge House, Ruggles & Ochre Point Aves., Newport, RI (1882–83)
- Hawkhurst (Catherine Seymour House), Kay St. & Cranston Ave., Newport, RI (1882) - Split into 4 separate houses in 1930s.
- Henrietta Lieber House, 67 Rhode Island Ave., Newport, RI (1882–83)
- Matilda Lieber House, 69 Rhode Island Ave., Newport, RI (1882–83)
- Dudley Newton House, 52 Division St., Newport, RI (1882) - The architect's own home.
- William Gordon Weld II House, 364 Bellevue Ave., Newport, RI (1882–84)
- Bethshan (Theodore K. Gibbs House), 396 Gibbs Ave., Newport, RI (1883)
- Windecke (William Binney House), 80 Catherine St., Newport, RI (1883–84)
- Rectory for St. Mary R. C. Church, 14 William St., Newport, RI (1886) - Burned 1921.
- Darlington Schoolhouse, 600 Ramapo Valley Rd., Mahwah, NJ (1891) - Financed by Theodore Havemeyer, a Newport summer resident.
- Kinsley Building, 286 Thames St., Newport, RI (1891) - One of very few downtown buildings built in the late 19th century.
- Harold Carter Brown House, 459 Bellevue Ave., Newport, RI (1894)
- Fire Station No. 5, 119 Touro St., Newport, RI (1895) - Altered.
- Crossways (Stuyvesant Fish House), 95 Ocean Ave., Newport, RI (1896–98)
- Susan J. Weaver House, 59 Kay St., Newport, RI (1897)

Newton was also the supervising architect for James J. Van Alen's Wakehurst, designed in 1887 by English architect Charles Eamer Kempe. By himself he designed the estate's stables in 1888.
