= Bear Mountain (Hudson Highlands) =

Mountain in New York, United States

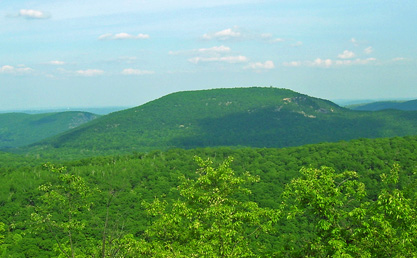
- Bear Mountain from Long Mountain in late-May 2006

Highest point
- Elevation: 1,289 ft (393 m)
- Prominence: 700 feet (213 m)
- Coordinates: 41°18′46″N 74°00′23″W

Geography
- Location within New York
- Location: Orange County, New York, U.S.
- Parent range: Hudson Highlands
- Topo map: USGS Popolopen Lake

Climbing
- Easiest route: road

Bear Mountain is one of the best-known peaks of New York's Hudson Highlands. Located partially in Orange County in the town of Highlands and partially in Rockland County in the town of Stony Point, it lends its name to the nearby Bear Mountain Bridge and Bear Mountain State Park that contains it.

Its summit, accessible by a paved road, has several roadside viewpoints, a picnic area and an observatory, the Perkins Memorial Tower. It is crossed by several hiking trails as well, including the oldest section of the Appalachian Trail (AT). As of 2021, the AT across Bear Mountain has been improved by the New York–New Jersey Trail Conference to minimize erosion and improve accessibility and sustainability as part of a project to rebuild and realign the trail that began in 2006. The Trailside Museum and Zoo located at the base of Bear Mountain is the lowest point on the Appalachian Trail (124 feet [38 m] above sea level).

The steep eastern face of the mountain overlooks the Hudson River. The eastern side of the mountain consists of a pile of massive boulders, often the size of houses, that culminate in a 50-foot (15 m) cliff face at approximately the 1,000-foot (300 m) level. A direct scramble from the shore of Hessian Lake to Perkins Memorial Drive on the summit requires a gain of about 1,000 feet (300 m) in roughly 0.8 miles (1.3 km). From the summit, one can see as far as Manhattan, and the monument on High Point in New Jersey.

== History ==
- Bear Mountain was historically known as "Bear Hill" and "Bread Tray Mountain".

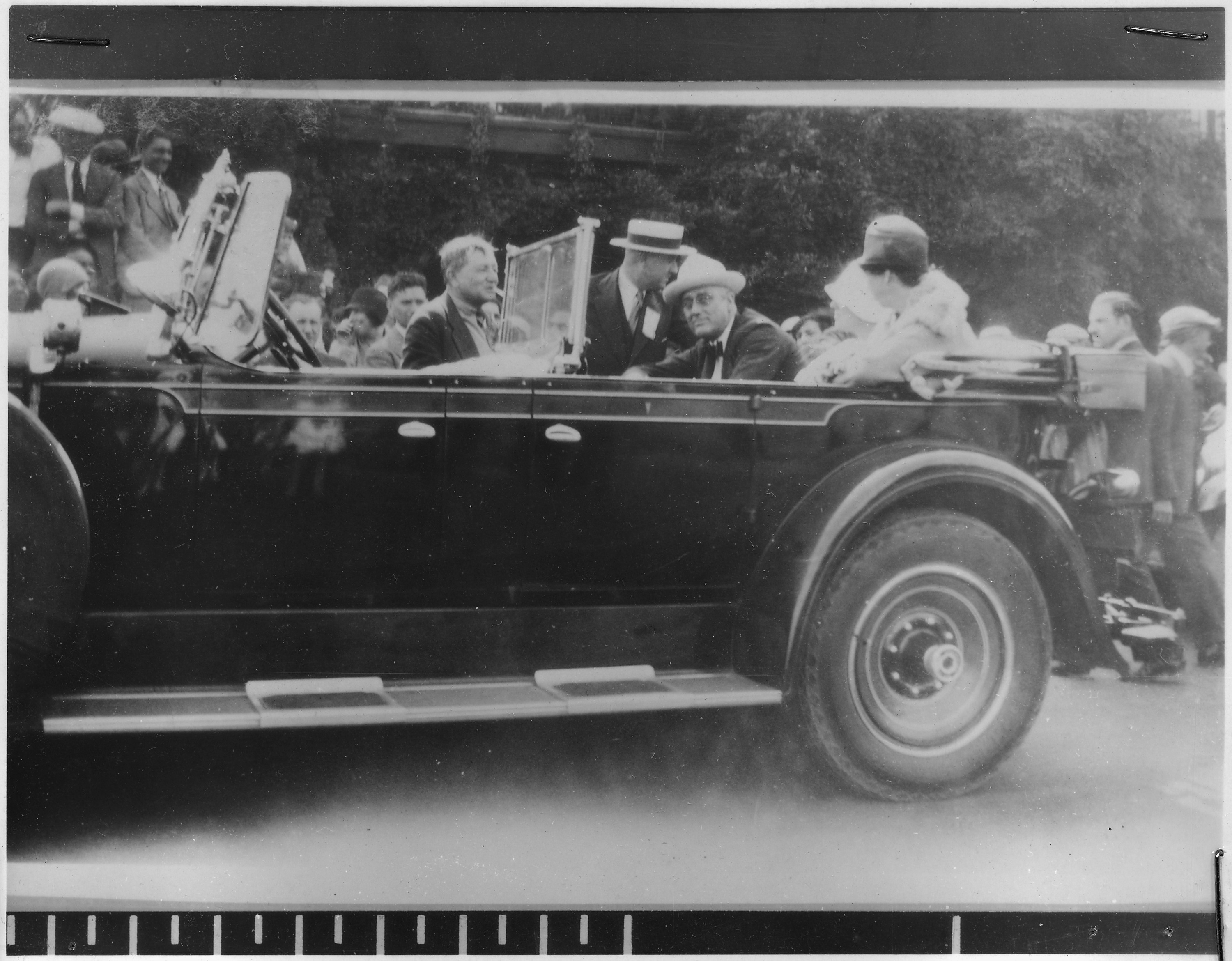
Franklin D. Roosevelt at Bear Mountain, 1929

- Franklin D. Roosevelt's paralytic illness developed in the summer of 1921, two weeks after he visited a Boy Scout camp at Hessian Lake on the eastern edge of Bear Mountain. It is possible the illness was related to exposure at the camp.
- Bear Mountain was once the premier ski jumping site in the United States. Because of its reputation as a ski jumping location, Bear Mountain was considered as a possible site for the 1932 Winter Olympics, which were held in Lake Placid, New York. The ski jump run has not been used in decades, and its stone steps built into the eastern side of the mountain are now crumbling.
- During World War II, the Brooklyn Dodgers held their spring training here.
- In 1928, the Palisades State Park Commission built a 60-foot-tall (18 m) Aermotor LS40 steel fire lookout tower on the mountain. It was taken down seven years later to make room to build the Perkins Memorial Tower which was erected in honor of George W. Perkins Sr., who was the first president of the Palisades Interstate Park Commission. The memorial tower was a gift of Perkins's widow and their son. The tower was used as a weather station and fire lookout until 1953. In 1990, the Perkins family agreed to donate $650,000 over a six-year period to maintain the tower. The tower was later completely renovated and re-opened to the public.
