= New York–New Jersey Trail Conference =

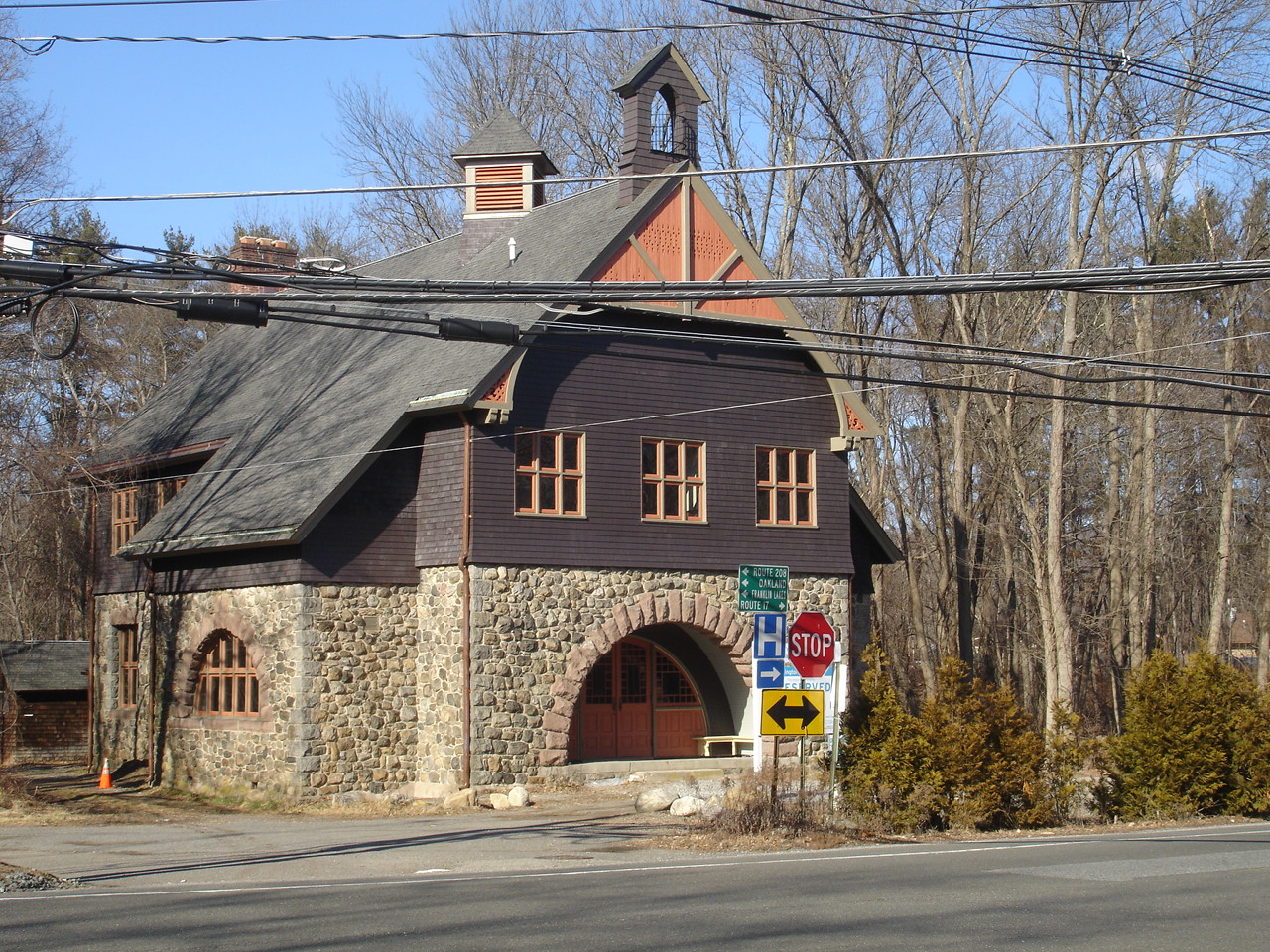
Darlington Schoolhouse, Mahwah, New Jersey

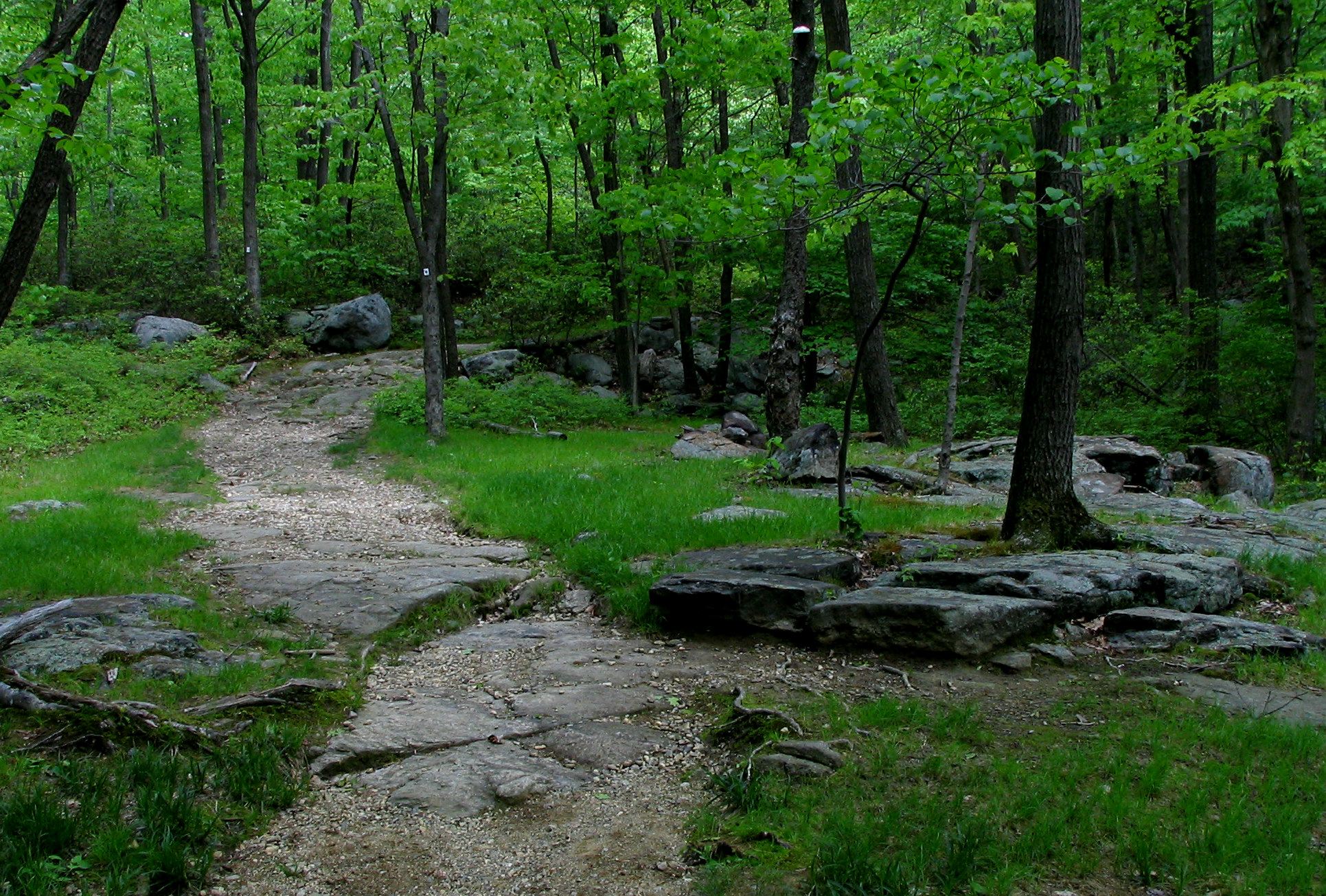
Seven Hills Trail, Harriman State Park, New York

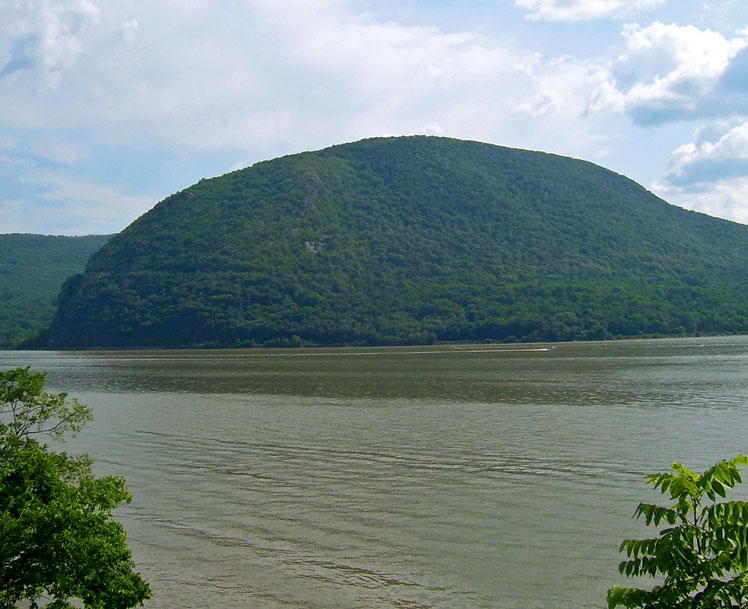
Storm King Mountain from the Breakneck Ridge Metro-North Train Station across the Hudson River

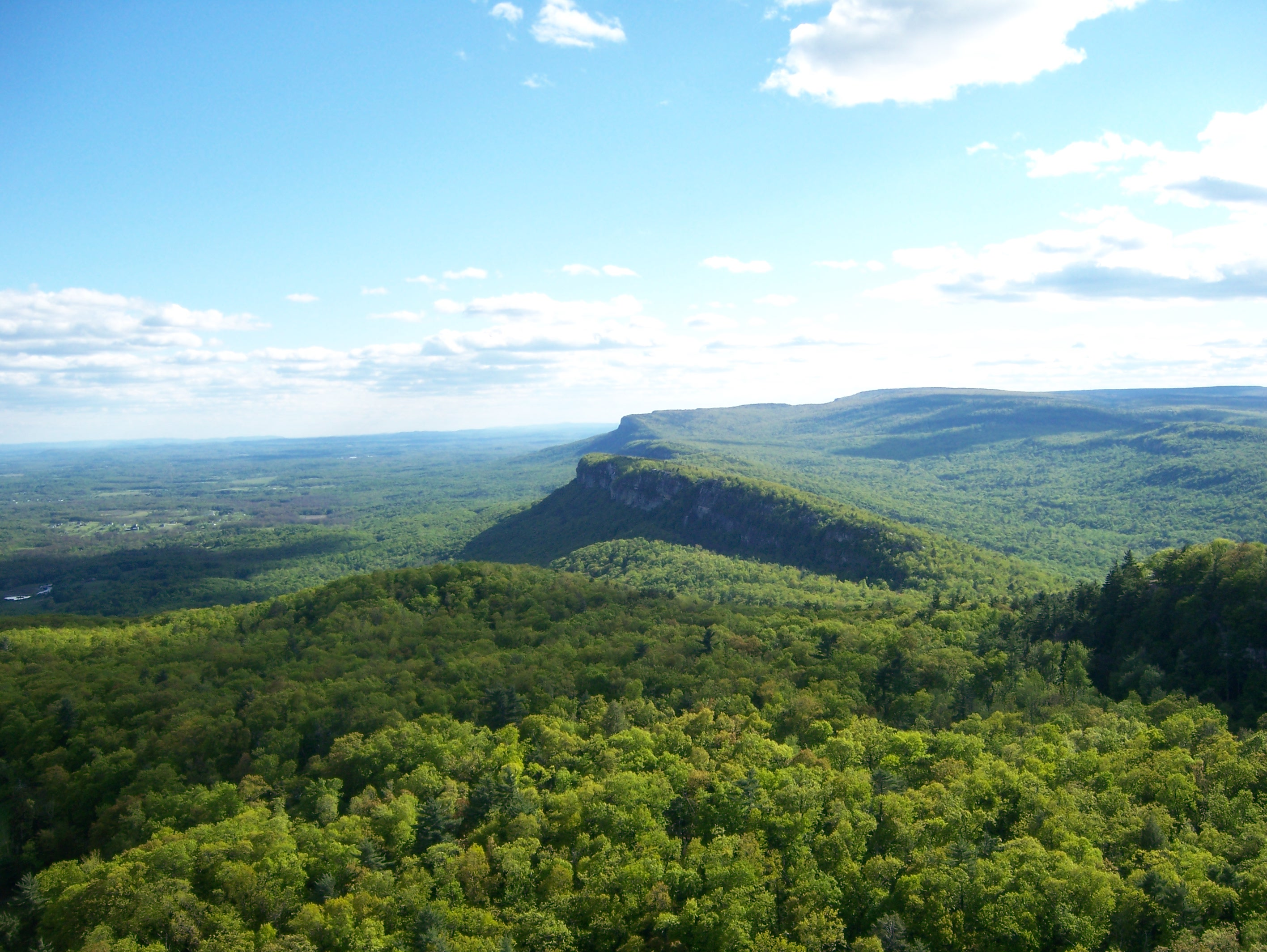
Shawangunk Ridge from Skytop Cliff, New York

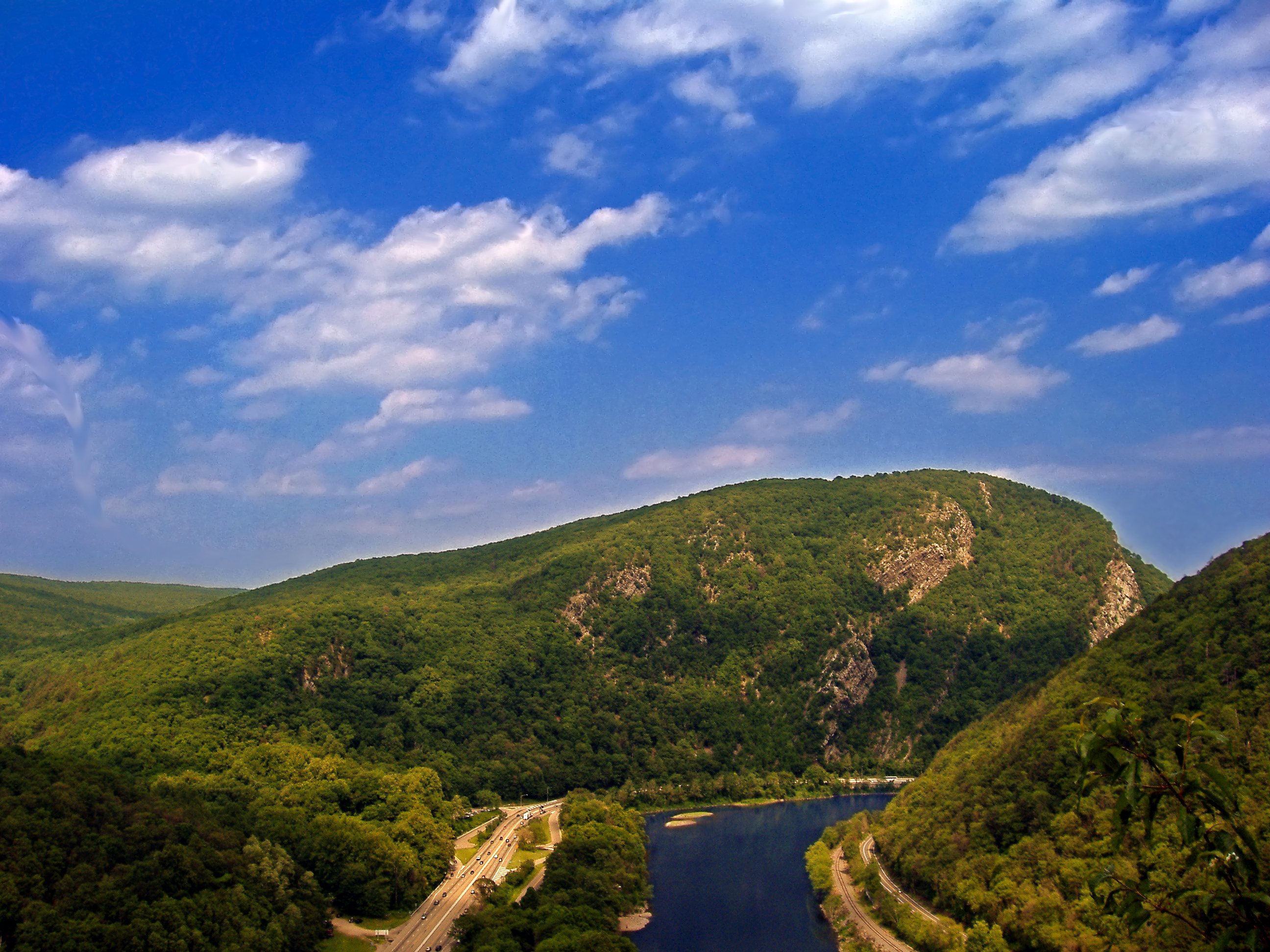
Delaware Water Gap National Recreation Area

The New York – New Jersey Trail Conference (NYNJTC) is a volunteer-based federation of approximately 10,000 individual members and about 100 member organizations (mostly hiking clubs and environmental organizations). The conference coordinates the maintenance of 2,000 miles of foot trails around the New York metropolitan area, from the Delaware Water Gap, north to beyond the Catskill Mountains, including the Appalachian Trail through New York and New Jersey. It also works to protect open space and publishes books and trail maps. The organization's headquarters are at 600 Ramapo Valley Road, Mahwah, New Jersey.

== History ==
On October 19, 1920 local hiking clubs gathered in the Log Cabin atop the Abercrombie & Fitch sporting goods store in New York City. The meeting was proposed by Meade C. Dobson of the Boy Scouts of America and organized by Major William A. Welch, general manager of the Palisades Interstate Park Commission to plan a system of hiking trails to make Harriman-Bear Mountain State Park more accessible to the public. In addition to Welch and Dobson, those attending included Raymond H. Torrey, who edited the Outings page of the New York Evening Post, and included representatives from the Appalachian Mountain Club, the Fresh Air Club, the Green Mountain Club, the Tramp and Trail Club, the Associated Mountaineering Clubs of America and the League of Walkers. Major Welch guided the organization during its first ten years. Raymond Torrey served as its Secretary.

In 1922 a proposal by forester Benton MacKaye to build a 2,100-mile (3,400 km) trail from Maine to Georgia (subsequently named the Appalachian Trail) was publicized by the New York Evening Post. The project generated great enthusiasm, and on October 7, 1923, the first section of the trail, from Bear Mountain west through Harriman State Park to Arden, New York, was opened by groups of enthusiastic volunteers.

The first trails built were the Ramapo-Dunderberg, the Timp-Torne, the Tuxedo-Mount Ivy Trails, and the Boy Scouts' White Bar Trail; all are still in use.

In 1923, the Palisades Interstate Trail Conference changed its name to the New York New Jersey Trail Conference.

During the 1930s, as more trails were built, a system of trail maintenance was developed giving each hiking club a share of responsibility. Over the ensuing years, as the number of miles of trails maintained has grown, the Trail Conference has relied on trained individual volunteers as well to maintain the trails. They also have developed skilled volunteer trail crews to repair and build trails.

According to one study, for every $1 invested in trails, $2.94 is returned in medical benefits from improved health.

== Land acquisition and preservation ==
On May 31, 2011 the Times Herald-Record reported by Stephen Sacco that the New York - New Jersey Trail Conference had helped expand the Huckleberry Ridge State Forest in Orange County, New York by transferring 389 acres from the New York - New Jersey Trail Conference holdings to the State of New York. The Huckleberry Ridge State Forest grew to 1500 acres with the acres purchased from the Trail Conference. The New York State Department of Environmental Conservation paid $1.55 million for the land purchase from the New York - New Jersey Trail Conference, the Times Herald-Record reports. Stephen Sacco goes on to report that throughout New York and New Jersey, the New York - New Jersey Trail Conference has managed to preserve 2400 acres through direct land purchases in the past 10 years. Protecting the 43 mile long Shawangunk Ridge Trail has been a priority for the New York - New Jersey Trail Conference and other conservation groups including Open Space Institute, The Nature Conservancy, and the Orange County Land Trust was also reported by the Times Herald-Record.

The Trail Conference has been active in open space preservation in its region since its earliest days, including the efforts that led to the preservation of Storm King Mountain, now Storm King State Park. In that project, the Trail Conference joined with The Nature Conservancy to found the Scenic Hudson Preservation Committee, which eventually became known and established as Scenic Hudson, and which continues to protect land today. The Trail Conference also led the effort to preserve Sterling Forest in New York and the Delaware Water Gap National Recreation Area on the border of New Jersey and Pennsylvania.

== Associations ==
The Trail Conference participates in, or attends in an advisory or information gathering capacity, a number of governmental, quasi-governmental, or not-for-profit agencies, including:

- Adirondack Mountain Club
- Appalachian Trail Conservancy
- Catskill Mountain 3500 Club
- Darlington Schoolhouse
- Green Mountain Club
- Highlands Coalition
- National Park Service
  - Delaware Water Gap National Recreation Area
- New Jersey Department of Environmental Protection
  - New Jersey Division of Parks and Forestry
  - New Jersey Division of Fish and Wildlife
  - New Jersey State Trails Council
- New York State Department of Environmental Conservation
  - New York State Trails Council
- New York State Office of Parks, Recreation and Historic Preservation, Taconic region
- Open Space Institute
- Orange County Land Trust
- Palisades Interstate Park Commission
  - Bear Mountain State Park
  - Harriman State Park
  - Minnewaska State Park Preserve
- Rivers and Trails Coalition
- Shawangunk Ridge Coalition
- Sierra Club, New Jersey Chapter
- Sterling Forest Partnership
- Teatown Lake Reservation
- The Nature Conservancy
- United States Forest Service

== See also ==
- Sustainability
- Biodiversity
- Ecology
- Earth Science
- Natural environment
- Nature
