= Bear Mountain State Park =

State park in New York, United States

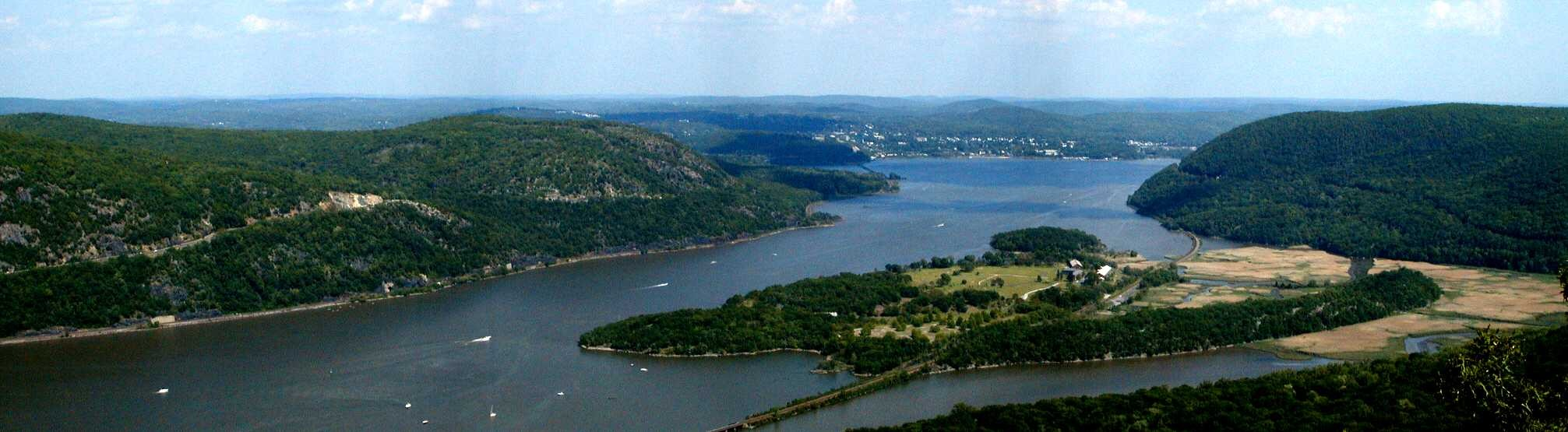
- View of the Hudson River from Bear Mountain

- Location within New York
- Location: Rockland and Orange Counties, New York, United States
- Nearest city: Fort Montgomery, NY (2 miles); New York City (50 miles)
- Coordinates: 41°18′46″N 74°00′21″W
- Area: 5,205 acres (21.06 km^{2})
- Established: 1913
- Visitors: 2,201,449 (in 2020)
- Governing body: Palisades Interstate Park Commission; State of New York

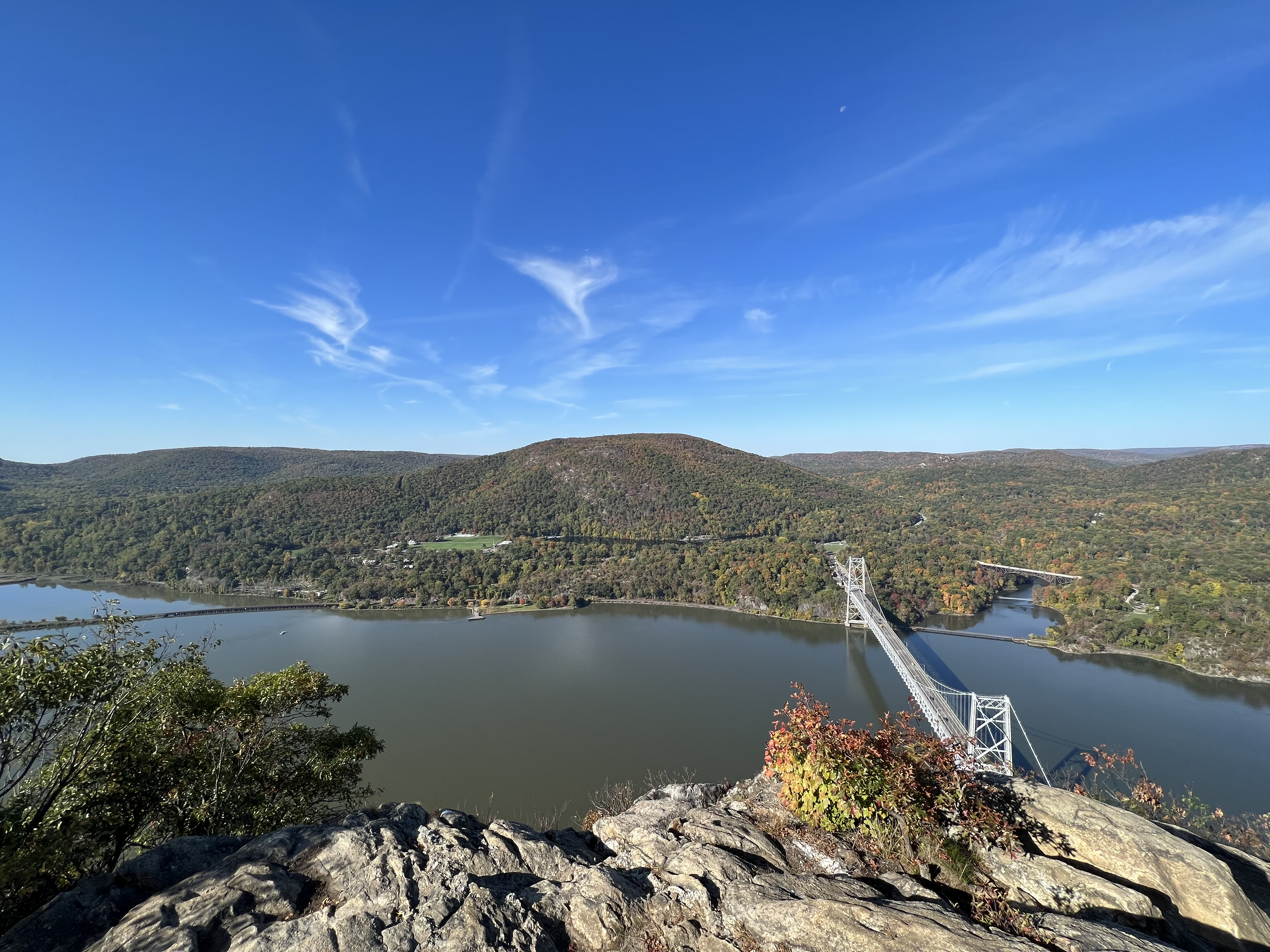
Bear Mountain, Bear Mountain State Park, and the Bear Mountain Bridge as seen from Anthony's Nose.

Bear Mountain State Park is a 5,205-acre (21.06 km^{2}) state park located on the west bank of the Hudson River in Rockland and Orange counties, New York. The park offers biking, hiking, boating, picnicking, swimming, cross-country skiing, cross-country running, sledding and ice skating. It also includes several facilities such as the Perkins Memorial Tower, the Trailside Museum and Zoo, the Bear Mountain Inn, a merry-go-round, a pool, and a skating rink. It also hosts the Bear Mountain Circle, where the historic Palisades Interstate Parkway and Bear Mountain Bridge meet. It is managed by the Palisades Interstate Park Commission, which is overseen by the State of New York.

== Geography ==
The park includes Bear Mountain as well as Dunderberg Mountain and West Mountain. Fort Montgomery is adjacent to the north edge of the park, while Iona Island Bird Sanctuary is on the eastern edge in the Hudson River. The park is a separate entity from the adjacent Harriman State Park, which runs along the western edge of the park. It lies within the Northeastern coastal forests ecoregion.

== History ==
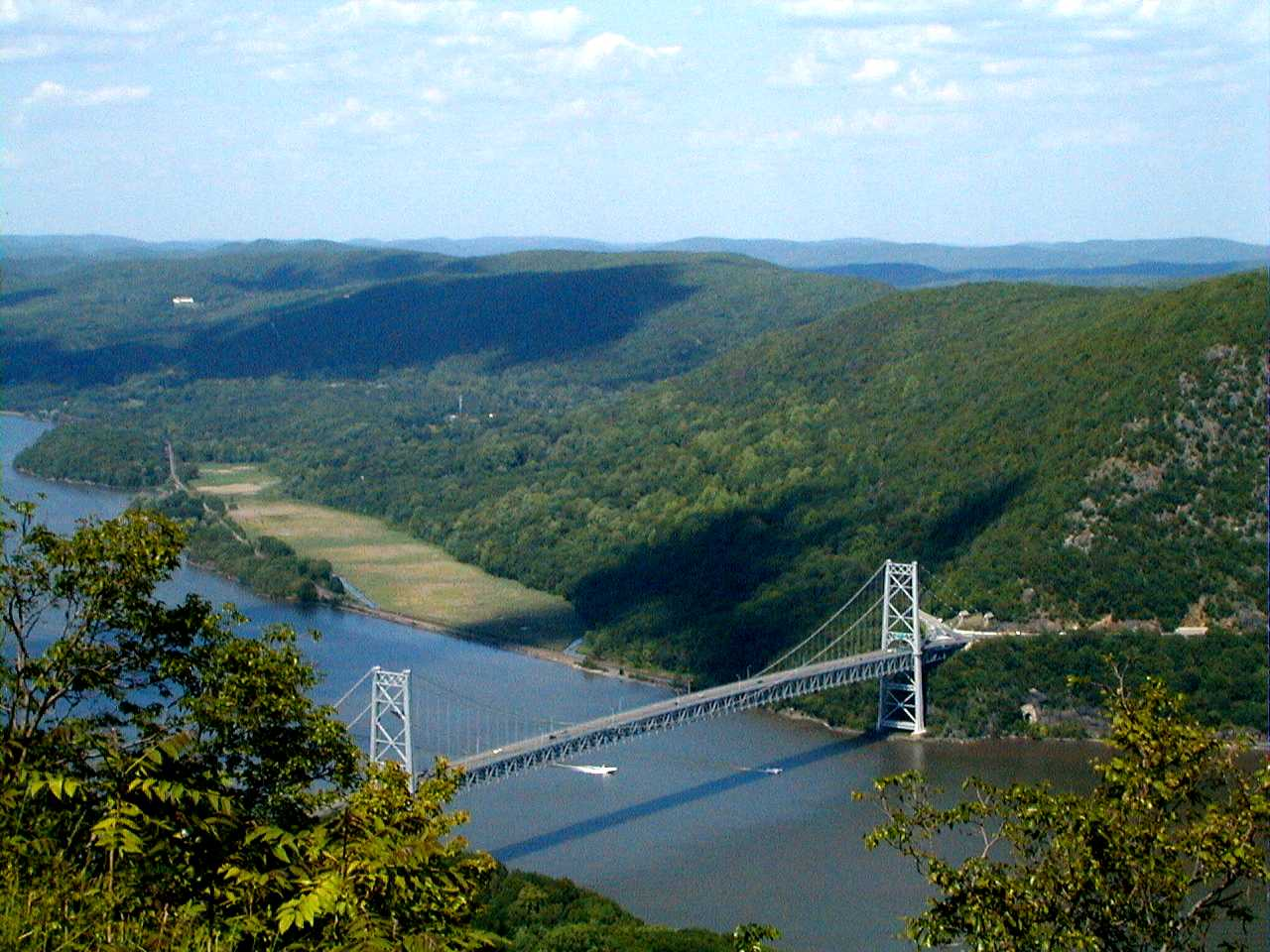
View of Bear Mountain Bridge from the Perkins Memorial Drive mountain summit. The bridge enters the northern edge of the park, the only portion that is in Orange County.

During the American Revolution, when the British viewed control of the Hudson River as essential to dominating the American territories, the area that was to become the park saw several significant military engagements. In 1777, British troops routed Patriots at Fort Montgomery. Anthony Wayne's attack of the British fort at Stony Point moved colonial troops to the west of Bear Mountain.

In 1908 the State of New York announced plans to relocate Sing Sing Prison to Bear Mountain. Work was begun in the area near Highland Lake (renamed Hessian Lake) and in January 1909, the state purchased the 740-acre (3.0 km^{2}) Bear Mountain tract. Conservationists inspired by the work of the Palisades Interstate Park Commission lobbied successfully for the creation of the Highlands of the Hudson Forest Preserve, stopping the prison from being built.

Mary Averell Harriman, whose husband, Union Pacific Railroad president E. H. Harriman died in September of that year, offered the state another 10,000 acres (40 km^{2}) and one million dollars toward the creation of a state park. George W. Perkins, with whom she had been working, raised another $1.5 million from a dozen wealthy contributors including John D. Rockefeller and J. Pierpont Morgan. New York State appropriated a matching $2.5 million and the state of New Jersey appropriated $500,000 to build the Henry Hudson Drive, (which would be succeeded by the Palisades Interstate Parkway in 1947).

Bear Mountain-Harriman State Park became a reality the following year when the prison was demolished and a dock built for steamboat excursion traffic; the following year a new West Shore Railroad station was built near the dock. In 1912, a replica of Henry Hudson's ship, the Half Moon was built and moored at the dock. Major William A. Welch was hired as Chief Engineer, whose work for the park would win him recognition as the father of the state park movement (and later, the national park movement).

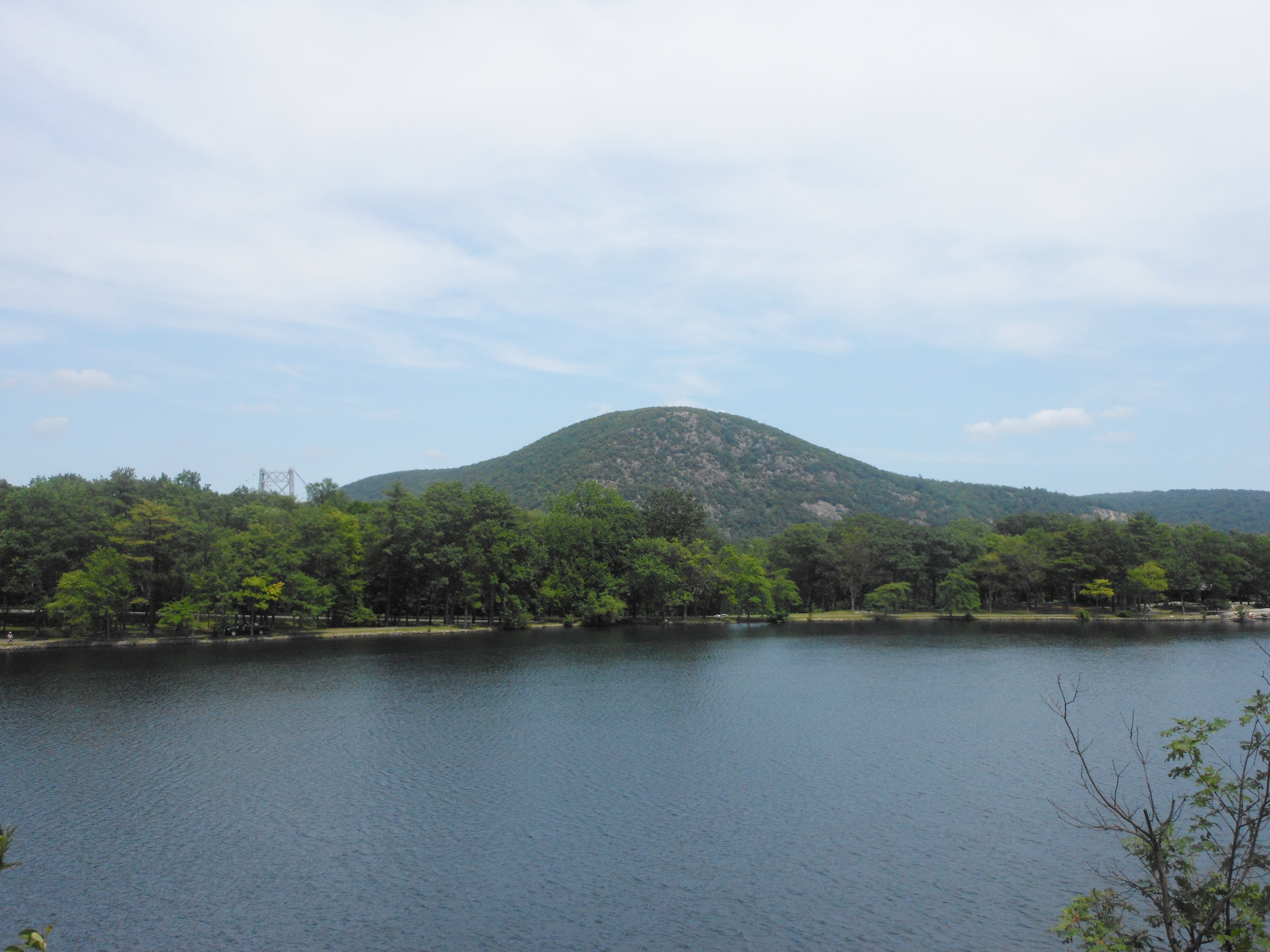
Hessian Lake at Bear Mountain State Park

The park opened in June 1913. Steamboats alone brought more than 22,000 passengers to the park that year. Camping at Hessian Lake (and later at Lake Stahahe) was immensely popular; the average stay was eight days and was a favorite for Boy Scouts. By 1914 it was estimated that more than a million people a year were coming to the park.

In the 1930s the federal government under Franklin D. Roosevelt was developing plans to preserve the environment as part of the Depression-era public works programs; the Civil Works Administration and the Works Progress Administration spent five years on projects at the park. Pump houses, reservoirs, sewer systems, vacation lodges, bathrooms, homes for park staff, storage buildings and an administration building were all created through these programs.

The park continued to grow after its creation. The Palisades Interstate Park Commission began purchasing nearby Doodletown in the 1920s and completed the acquisition with eminent domain in the 1960s.

The park temporarily closed between July and August of 2023 after a storm struck the area on the 9th of July which damaged multiple pieces of infrastructure and washed out many trails in the park. Many of the park's trails remained closed for the following couple of months, however a majority of the trails have since reopened.

== Facilities ==
=== Bear Mountain Inn ===
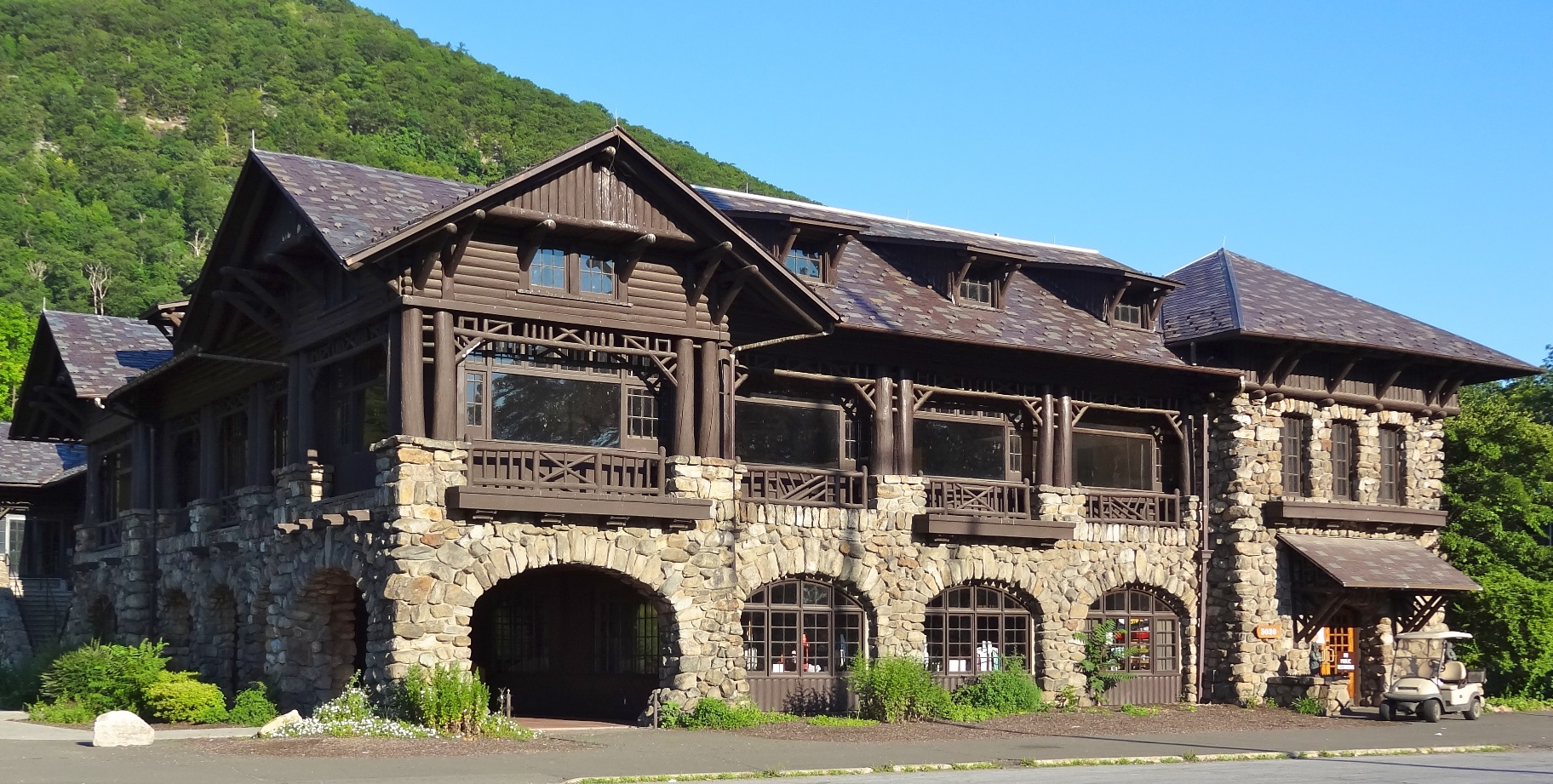
Bear Mountain Inn after renovation

Originally completed in 1915, the Bear Mountain Inn is an early example of the rustic lodge style influenced by the Adirondack Great Camps and later used extensively in the National Park System. It closed in 2005 for extended renovations, reopening in 2011.

=== Perkins Memorial Drive ===
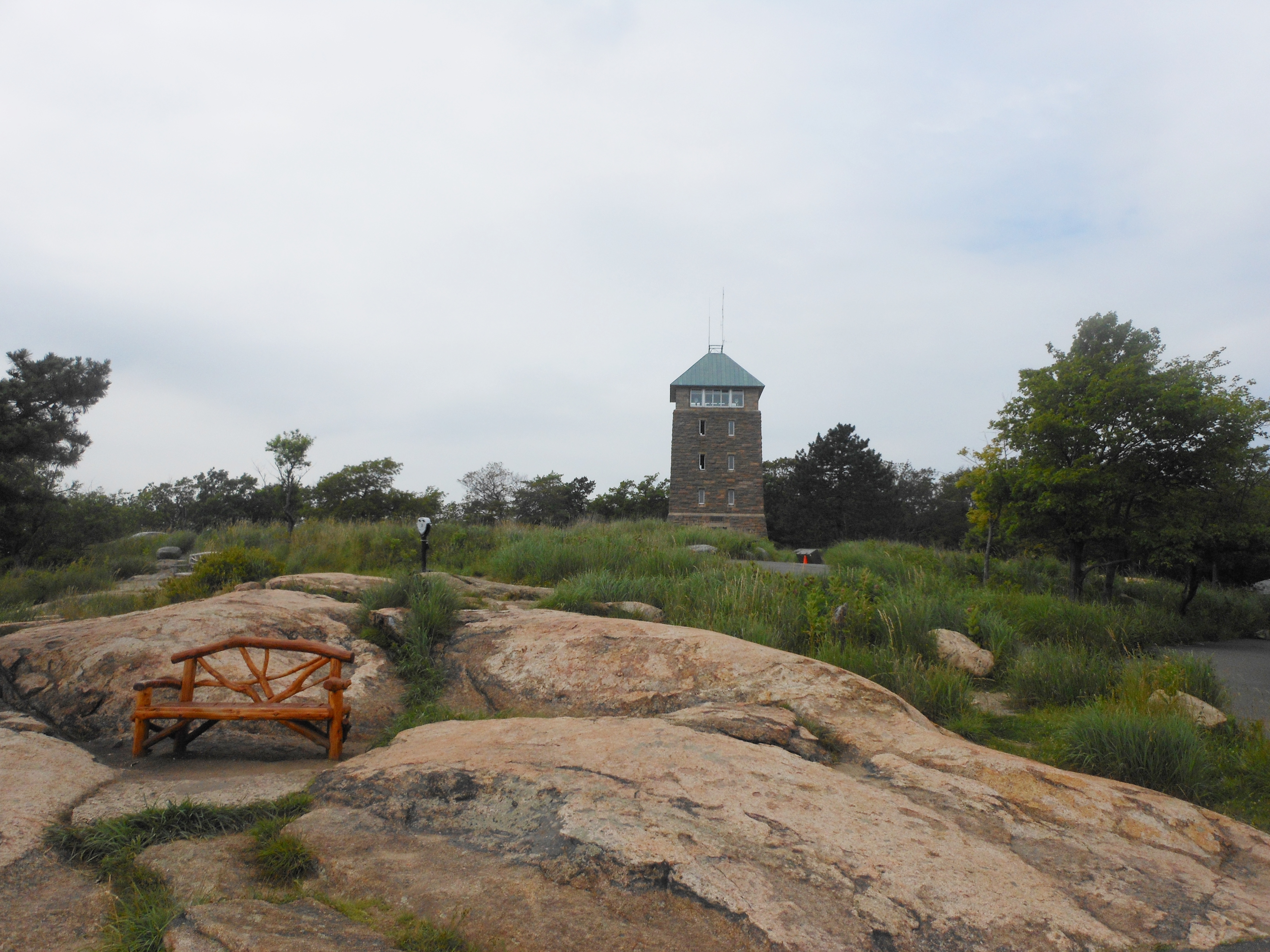
Peak of Bear Mountain

The Perkins Memorial Drive is a scenic road to the summit of Bear Mountain. At the summit, the 40 feet (12 m) Perkins Memorial Tower provides a view of four states and the skyline of Manhattan, 40 miles (64 km) to the south. The road and tower were built by the Civilian Conservation Corps between 1932 and 1934. It is named after George Wallbridge Perkins, the first president of the Palisades Interstate Park Commission.

=== Trailside Museums and Zoo ===
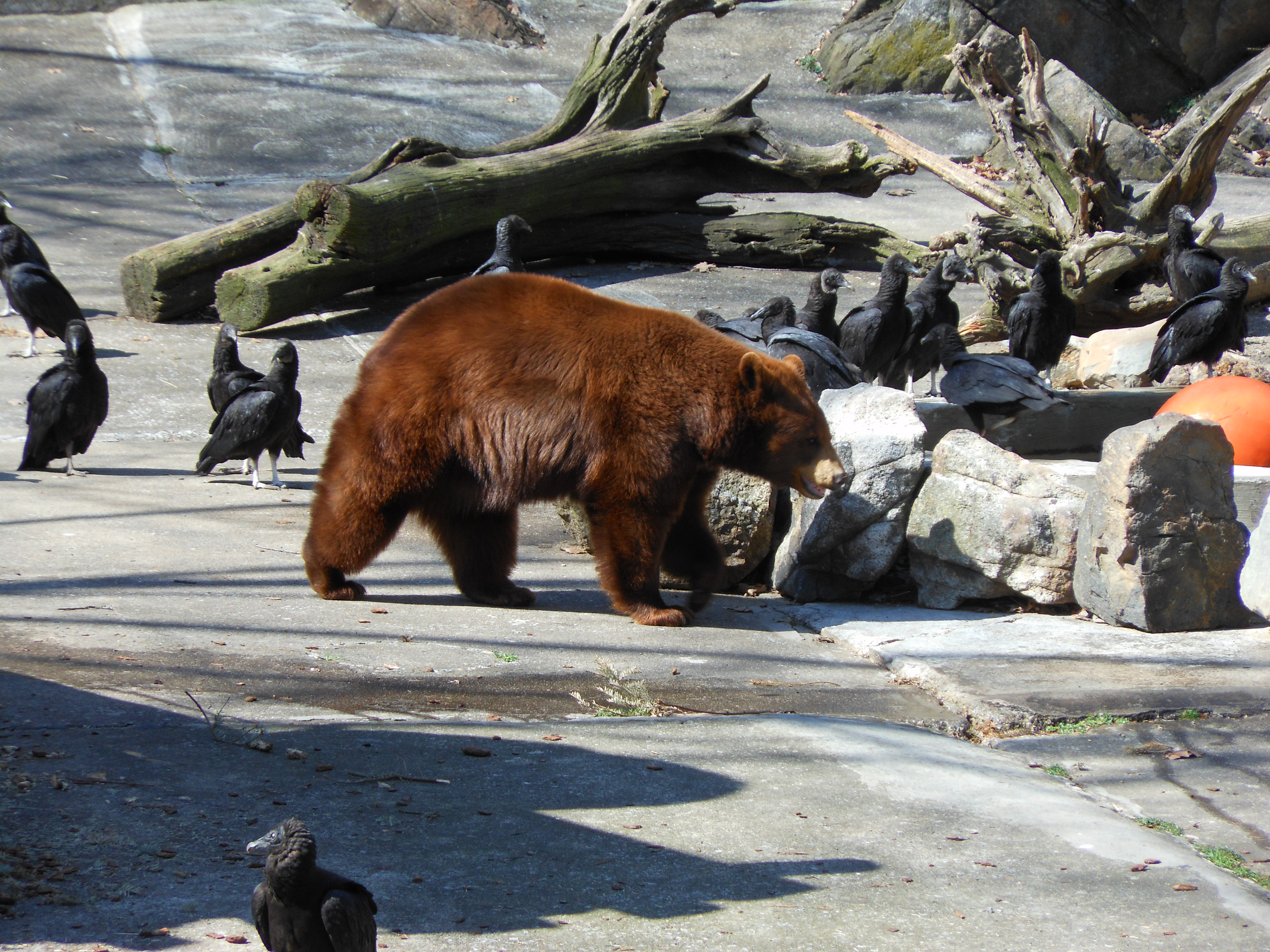
Bear Mountain Zoo

The Trailside Museums and Zoo are located at the former site of Fort Clinton. Its name is a reference to the Appalachian Trail that runs through the complex. The zoo began as a bear den in 1926 and is currently the home of a wide variety of local injured or rehabilitating animals, including bears, otters, deer, bald eagles, and owls. The zoo's popular otter died in June 2013, aged 19 years. The Reptile and Amphibian House has many species of fish, turtles, snakes and frogs.

In 1920, a field museum was maintained in a log pavilion on Lake Kawauke. WIth the success of this museum, a series of small museums were established in the main camping areas during July and August. In 1925, Frank E. Lutz, Curator of Entolomology at the American Museum of Natural History, created a labeled nature trail on the border of Harriman State Park. Interest in bringing outdoor education to Bear Mountain led the Commissioners of the Palisades Interstate Park to the establishment of the Trailside Museum. The project was funded by a grant from the Laura Spelman Rockefeller Memorial obtained by the American Association of Museums and the building was completed in 1927. The first permanent museum building was designed by Herbert Maier who also planned other museums created by the American Association of Museums in Grand Canyon National Park, Yellowstone National Park, and Yosemite National Park. The Bear Mountain Nature Trails and Trailside Museum was jointly maintained and operated by the American Museum of Natural History and the Palisades Interstate Park until New York State took over in 1935. William H. Carr served as the director of the Trailside Museum from 1927 until the mid-1940s.

The Geology Museum covers the Hudson Highlands and other local geology. The History Museum has exhibits about colonial and Native American culture. On February 11, 1962, 35,120 spectators turned out to watch the New York State Junior Ski Jumping Championship. More jump competitions were held at Bear Mountain than at any other ski jump in the United States. The ski jumps have not been used since 1990.

=== Hiking ===
There are over 50 official trails covering 235 miles (378 km), featuring a wide range of difficulties and elevation changes.

The first section of the Appalachian Trail, taking hikers from Bear Mountain south to the Delaware Water Gap, opened on October 7, 1923 and served as a pattern for the other sections of the trail developed independently by local and regional organizations and later by the federal government. The Bear Mountain Zoo, through which the Appalachian Trail passes, is the lowest elevation on the 2,100-mile (3,400 km) trail. There are six miles (9.7 km) of the AT located in the park. In 2010, sections of the AT within the park were rebuilt by the New York - New Jersey Trail Conference, with stone steps to handle the 500,000 annual hikers. The Manhattan skyline can be seen from the top of Bear Mountain.

=== Cross country running ===
Bear Mountain also regularly hosts cross country running events during the fall season. High school cross country teams compete on the 3.0-mile (4.8 km) course, which mostly consists of paved or rock walkways. Bear Mountain is the location for the County's Championship race as well as the Rockland County Alumni Race, run every year since 1983.

=== Cruises ===
Several cruise lines operate cruises with views and trips to the park. These ships ride the Hudson River fifty miles from Manhattan in order to visit the park.

== See also ==
- List of New York state parks
- Bear Mountain Bridge
- Dunderberg Mountain
- Palisades Parkway
