= Bear Mountain Bridge =

Bridge in New York State

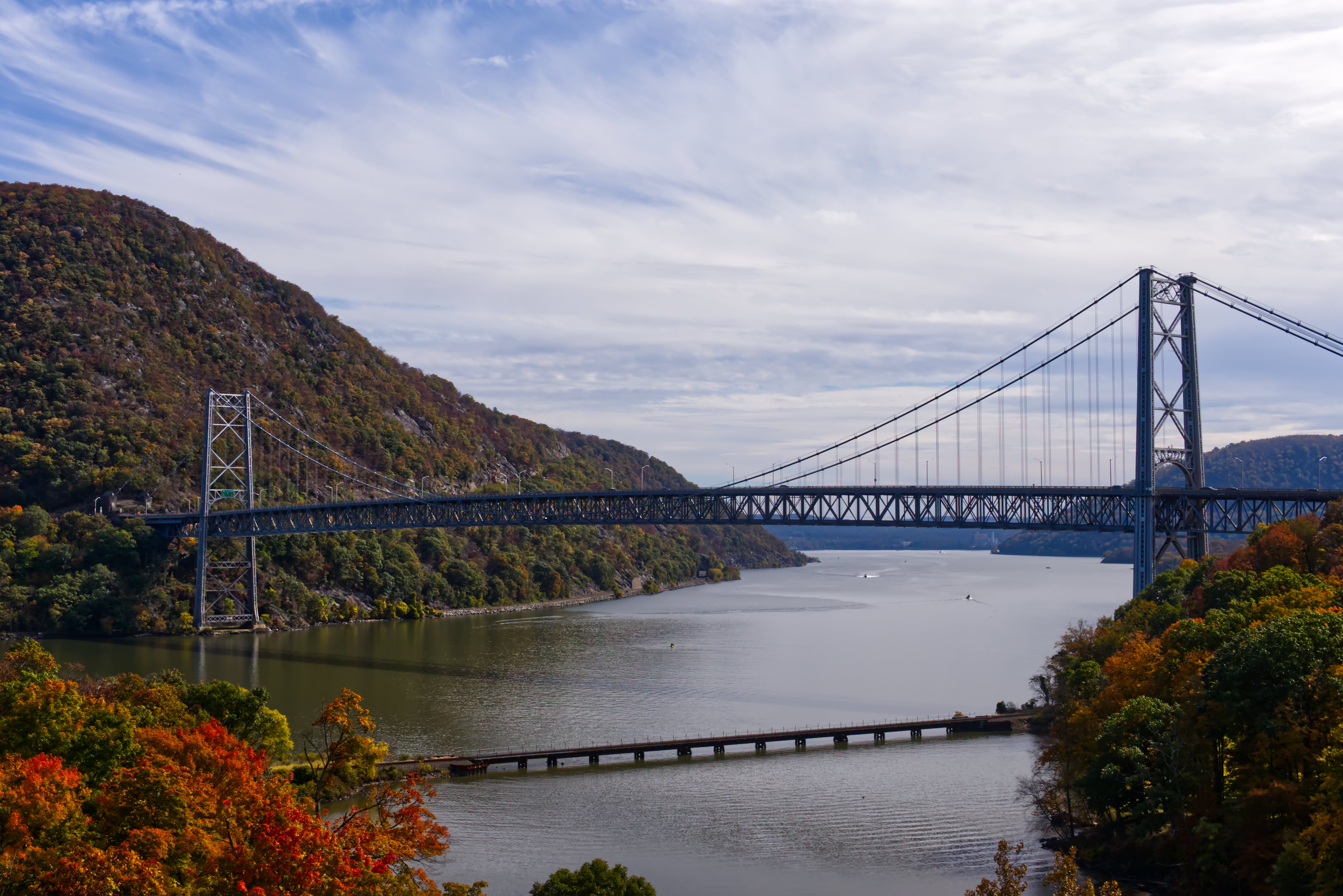
- Bear Mountain Bridge in 2022
- Coordinates: 41°19′12″N 73°58′49″W
- Carries: 2 lanes of US 6 / US 202 / Appalachian Trail / State Bike Route 9
- Crosses: Hudson River
- Locale: Cortlandt, New York and Bear Mountain, New York
- Other name: Purple Heart Veterans Memorial Bridge (ceremonial)
- Maintained by: New York State Bridge Authority

Characteristics
- Design: Suspension bridge
- Total length: 2,255 feet (687 m)
- Width: 48 feet (15 m)
- Height: 360 feet (110 m)
- Longest span: 1,632 feet (497 m)
- Clearance below: 155 feet (47 m)

History
- Opened: November 27, 1924; 101 years ago

Statistics
- Daily traffic: 17,695 (2007)
- Toll: (Eastbound only) cars: $1.65 E-ZPass $2.15 tolls-by-mail
- Bear Mountain Bridge
- U.S. National Register of Historic Places
- New York State Register of Historic Places
- Location within New York Location within the United States
- Location: Cortlandt / Bear Mountain
- Coordinates: 41°19′12″N 73°58′49″W
- Built: 1923; 103 years ago
- Built by: Terry & Tench Construction Co.
- Engineers: Baird, Howard C.
- MPS: Hudson Highlands MRA
- NRHP reference No.: 82001266
- NYSRHP No.: 11902.000040

Significant dates
- Added to NRHP: November 23, 1982
- Designated NYSRHP: September 30, 1982

Location
- Interactive map of Bear Mountain Bridge

The Bear Mountain Bridge, ceremonially named the Purple Heart Veterans Memorial Bridge, is a toll suspension bridge in New York State. It carries US 6 and US 202 across the Hudson River between Bear Mountain State Park in Rockland and Orange County and Cortlandt in Westchester County. At completion in 1924 it was the longest suspension bridge in the world until this record was surpassed 19 months later by the Benjamin Franklin Bridge between Philadelphia and Camden, New Jersey. Like the Williamsburg Bridge in New York City, the approach spans of the Bear Mountain Bridge are unsuspended; only its main span (between the towers) is suspended by cables.

The span enables connections between the Palisades Interstate Parkway and US 9W on the west bank near Bear Mountain and NY 9D on the east bank as well as US 9 and the Bear Mountain Parkway farther east. It also carries the Appalachian Trail and New York State Bicycle Route 9 across the Hudson.

The bridge has two undivided vehicle lanes flanked by sidewalks. Cyclists may ride with motor vehicle traffic or walk their bikes on the sidewalks.

== History ==
=== Hudson Highland Suspension Bridge ===
Plans for a bridge at the site began with the charter of the Hudson Highland Suspension Bridge Company in 1868 after a bill was passed by the legislature and signed by Governor Fenton. Early investors in the company included Erastus Corning, Isaac Bell, and Addison P. Jones.

The following year, The New York Times reported that a contract had been signed and construction would "speedily commence" on the "Hudson Highland Suspension Bridge" between Fort Clinton and Anthony's Nose. The intent was to carry a railroad toward Derby, Connecticut, to supply coal and iron for industry in the lower Naugatuck Valley. The surface of the bridge was to be 150 feet (46 m) above high tide. In 1871, a board of engineers had been selected to work on the bridge, including Horatio Allen, George B. McClellan, Edward W. Serrell, and Quincy Adams Gillmore. It was reported that capital of $2.5 million was needed and that much of it had been raised from the railroads who would benefit from the bridge. At this time, construction was expected to begin in June 1871 and to be complete by 1875.

In 1887, reports said the bridge would be finished in two years. By 1889, "work on the anchor pits was progressing rapidly." On March 5, 1896, the Hudson Highland Bridge and Railway Company filed for incorporation with capital of $84,900. The company was a reorganization of the former Hudson Suspension Bridge and New England Railway Company.

None of these attempts to build the bridge were successful, with only foundation preparations having progress made. Much of this period coincided with the so-called Long Depression, including stock market crashes called the Panic of 1873 and Panic of 1893. A charter for construction of the bridge expired in 1916.

=== Bear Mountain Hudson River Bridge Company ===
In March 1922 through a bill introduced by C. Ernest Smith, the state legislature authorized creation of the private Bear Mountain Hudson River Bridge Company to complete the project. The bridge was now for automobiles instead of rail, and included a 3-mile (4.8 km) approach road from the Albany Post Road north of Peekskill. The 11-member board of directors included financiers E. Roland Harriman and George W. Perkins. Under the 1922 charter, ownership of the bridge was to revert by 1962 to New York State, which also had the right to acquire the bridge at any time. A $4.5 million bond issue was completed in April of that year through the Harriman banking and brokerage firm.

=== Completion ===
When the bridge formally opened on November 27, 1924, it was the longest suspension bridge span in the world, and the first of its type to have a concrete deck. It was the first automobile bridge to cross the Hudson south of Albany, and surpassed the 1888 Poughkeepsie Railroad Bridge as the southernmost crossing of the river.

Construction methods pioneered on the Bear Mountain Bridge influenced much larger projects to follow, including the George Washington (1931) and Golden Gate (1937) bridges. Completion also inspired the state to extend the Bronx River Parkway from Kensico Dam northward, work which evolved into the Bear Mountain Parkway and the first phase of the Taconic State Parkway.

=== New York State Bridge Authority ===
Ownership was transferred to the New York State Bridge Authority on September 26, 1940, and the toll was reduced to a flat rate of 50 cents per automobile.

Originally, tolls were collected in both directions. In August 1970, the toll was abolished for westbound drivers, and at the same time, eastbound drivers saw their tolls doubled. The tolls of eleven other New York–New Jersey and Hudson River crossings along a 130-mile (210 km) stretch, from the Outerbridge Crossing in the south to the Rip Van Winkle Bridge in the north, were also changed to eastbound-only at that time.

In 1982 the bridge and its then-abandoned original toll house several miles away on the Peekskill approach road, Routes 6 and 202, were added to the National Register of Historic Places. The bridge was also designated as a local historic civil engineering landmark by the American Society of Civil Engineers in 1986.

In 2019, the bridge authority announced that tolls on its five Hudson River crossings would increase each year beginning in 2020 and ending in 2023. On May 1, 2021, the toll for passenger cars traveling eastbound on the Mid-Hudson Bridge was $1.75 in cash, $1.45 for E-ZPass users. In May 2022, tolls rose to $1.55 for E-ZPass users and $2 for cash payers. In 2023, the E-ZPass toll was set at $1.65, and the cash toll was set at $2.15. Tolls are collected from eastbound travelers only.

At midnight on October 1, 2021, the bridge was converted to all-electronic tolling and only in the eastbound direction. Motorists can use their E-ZPass to pay the toll. Those without E-ZPass are sent a bill in the mail.

=== Maintenance innovation ===
The Bridge was used to test several new materials designed to lower the cost and environmental impact of bridge cable maintenance. One of them proved promising.

During routine inspections, bridge cables are unwrapped and wedges are used to separate the individual strands. Inspectors look for signs of moisture and corrosion throughout the cable. For over 100 years, a red lead paste was used to seal the strands against moisture intrusion. In addition to emerging as an environmental hazard during that span, the paste was also prone to drying out and cracking after a few years, creating an ongoing maintenance task.

In the 1990s engineers experimented with several materials on a small section of the cables of the Bear Mountain Bridge. After a year the test areas were reexamined and one polymer-based, non-toxic paste was found to be superior. The bridge cables were then rewrapped in 2000 using the material. Seven years later the cables were found to be free of additional moisture or corrosion. New York State Bridge Authority chief engineer William Moreau expressed hope that the new material may lengthen the life of the cables, and lower the need for inspection and maintenance.

== Renovation ==
The New York Bridge Authority (NYBA) approved a $93.8 million deck replacement project to a joint venture of El Sol Contracting and ES II Enterprises, which commenced in March 2026. The renovation will include replacing the concerete deck, last replaced in the 1976, with a new lightweight high performance concrete, Safety considerations such as anti-climb (climb deterrent) fencing for suicide prevention, widening the sidewalks to 5 feet, installing modern pedestrian barriers, incorporating new handrails, and installing new overlooks around the four bridge towers. The project is scheduled for completion by the end of 2027.

=== Suicide prevention ===
Calls for protective fencing have led the Port Authority of New York and New Jersey to install fencing on the GW and Bayonne Bridge. Two people jumped from the roadway side of the latter while the fencing was being installed. Since 2007 there have been 103 suicides and 43 attempted suicides from the five NYBA bridges that include the Rip Van Winkle, Kingston-Rhinecliff, Mid-Hudson, and the Newburgh-Beacon Bridges.

== Gallery ==
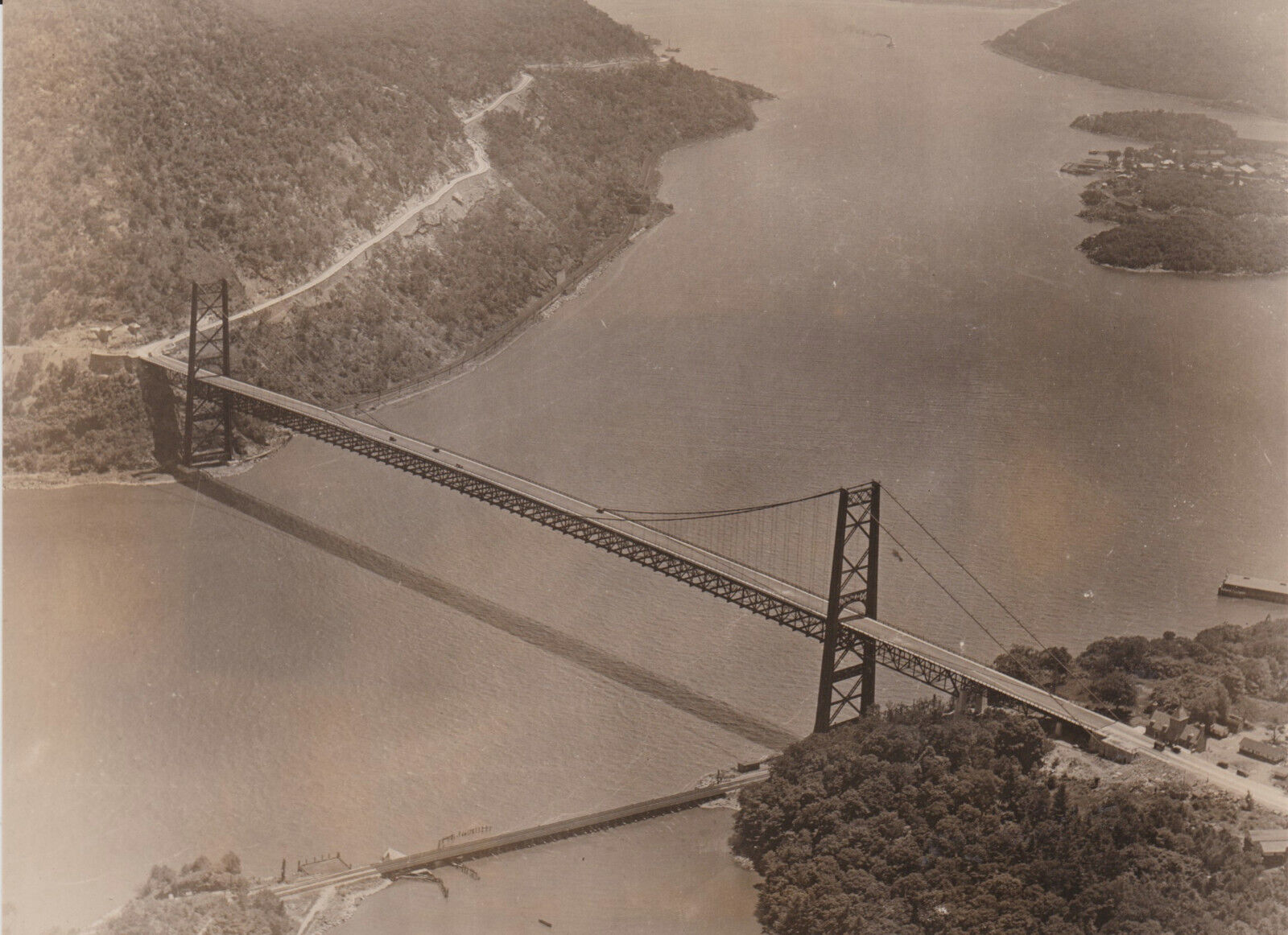
Aerial view in 1925

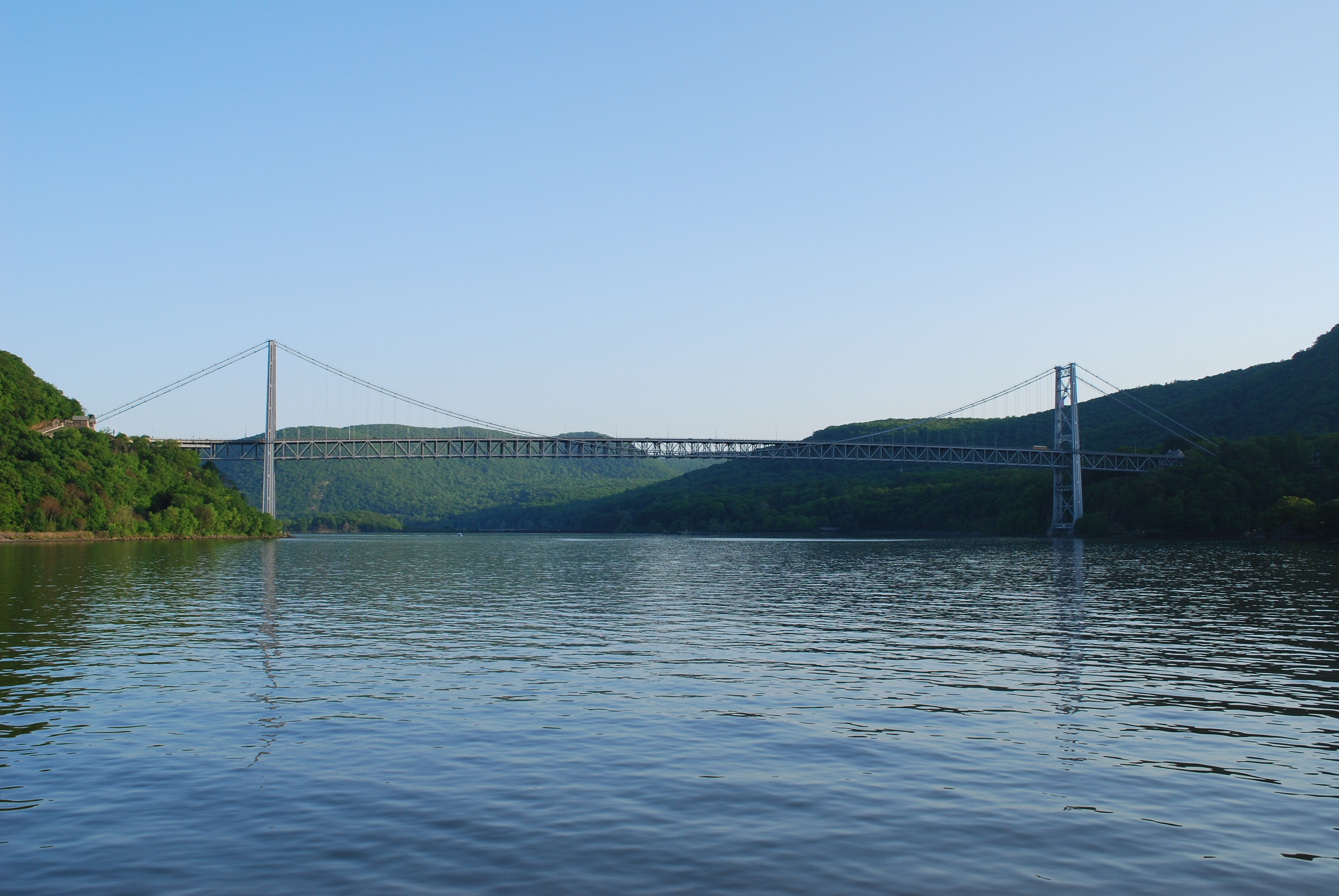
Bear Mountain Bridge in 2009

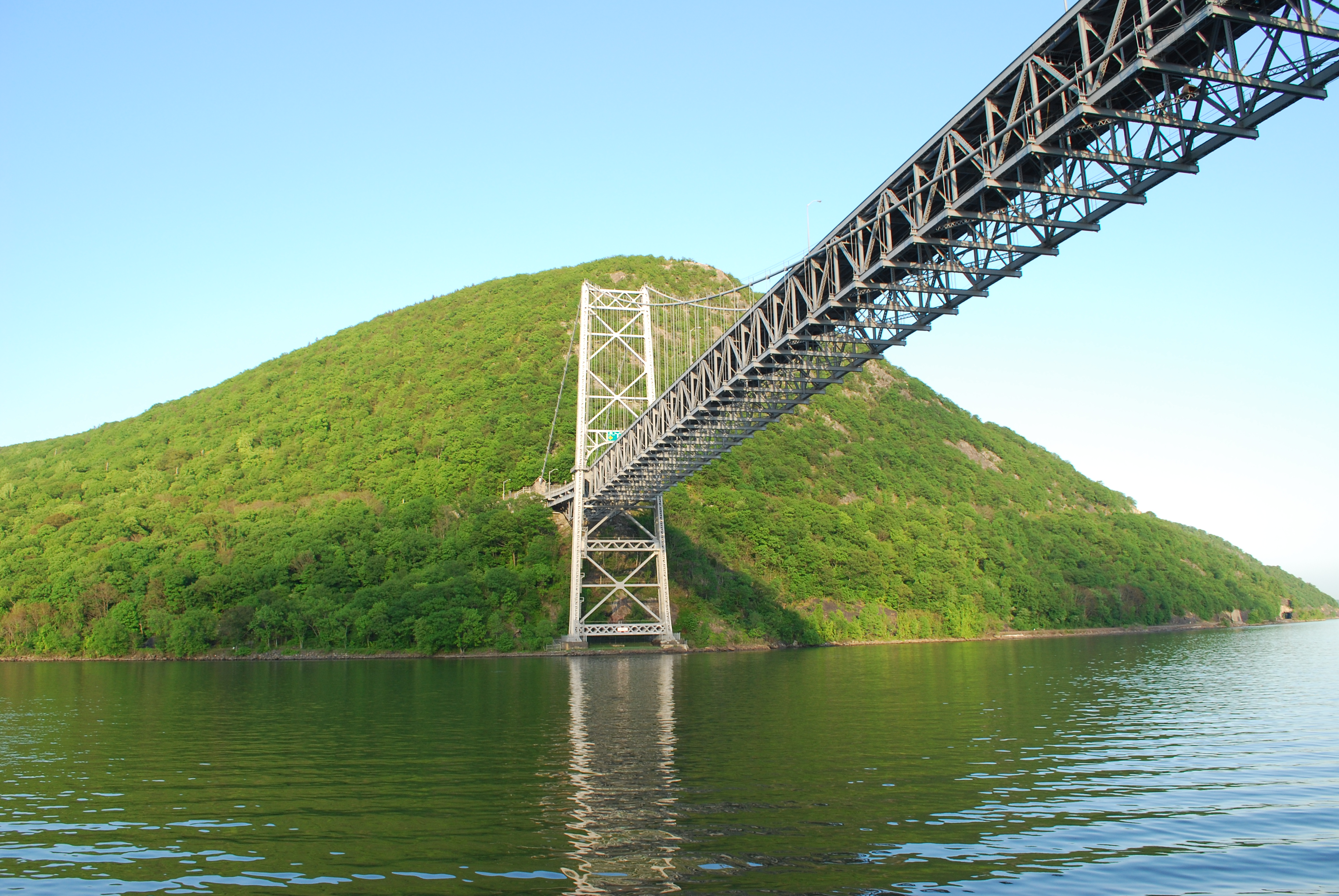
Looking east

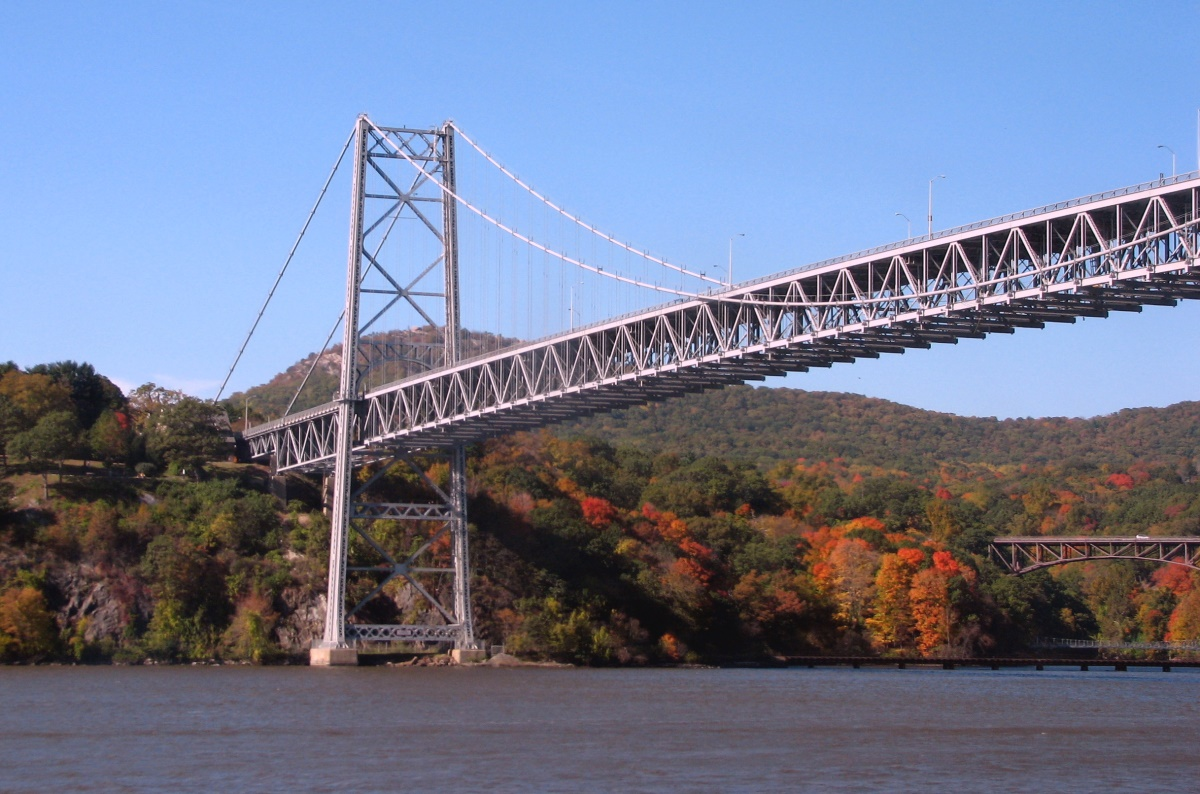
Looking northwest from the east bank

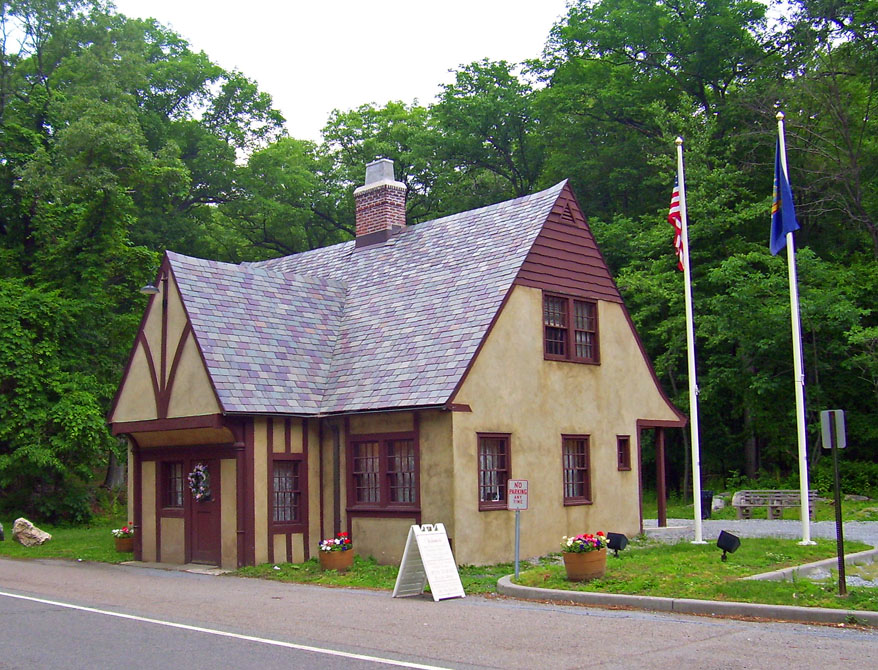
Old Bear Mountain Bridge Toll House along Routes 6 and 202, between the bridge and Peekskill, today used as an information center for surrounding parkland

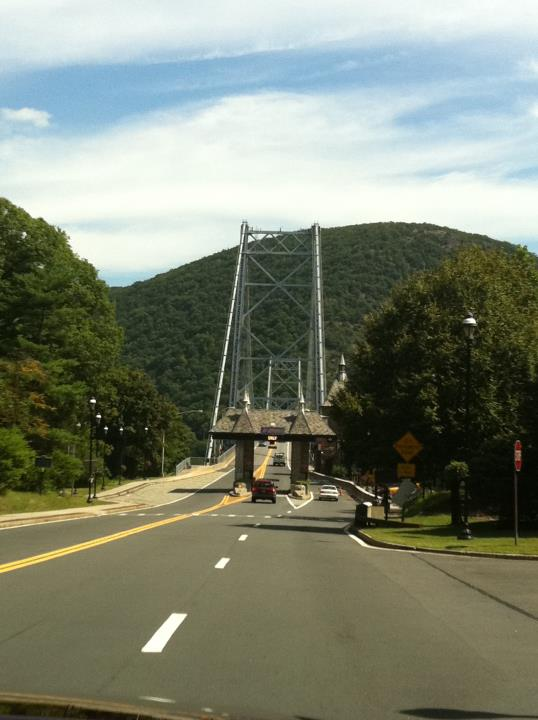
The Bear Mountain Bridge EZ Pass Toll in August 2011.

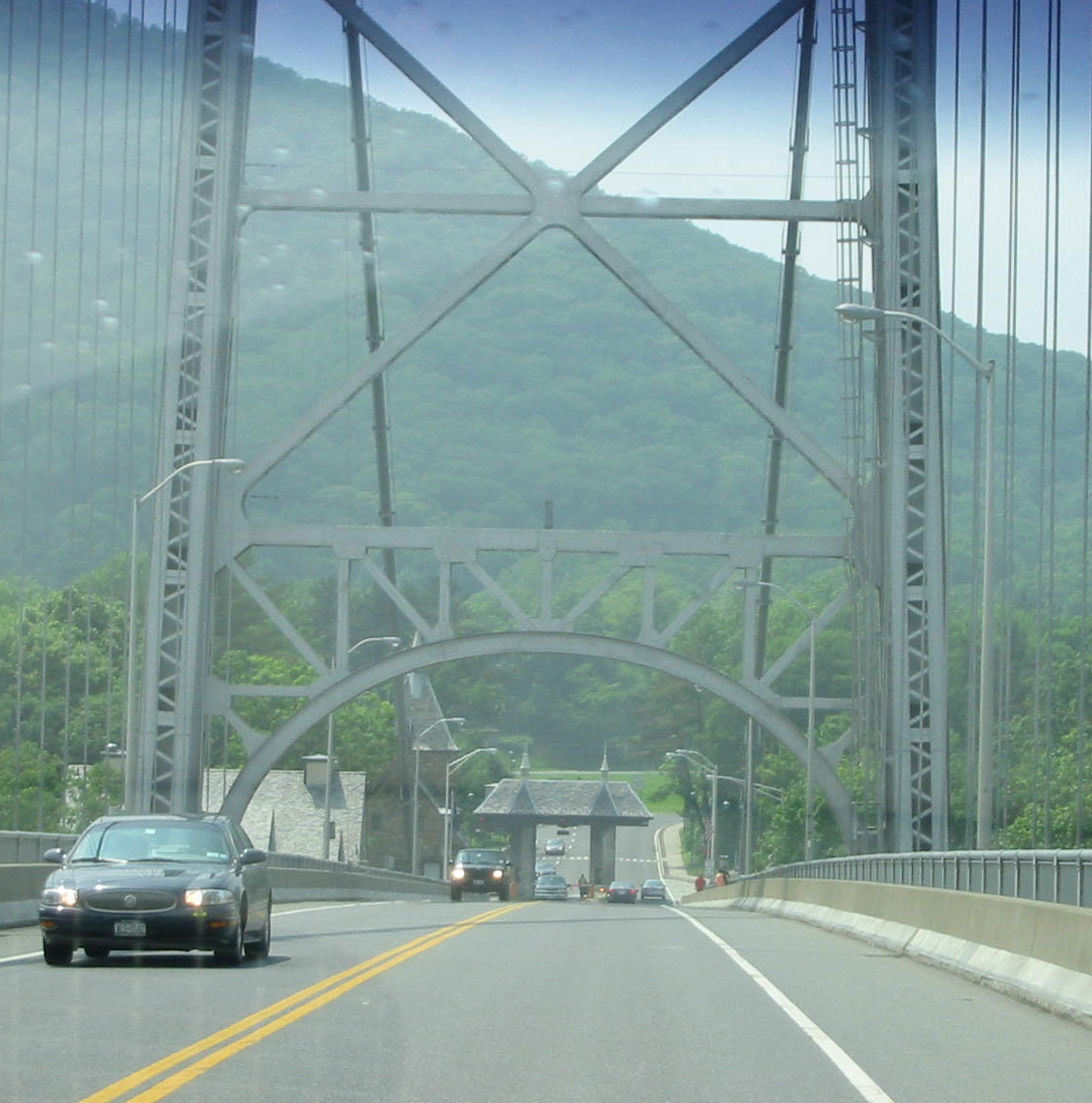
Heading westbound over the bridge
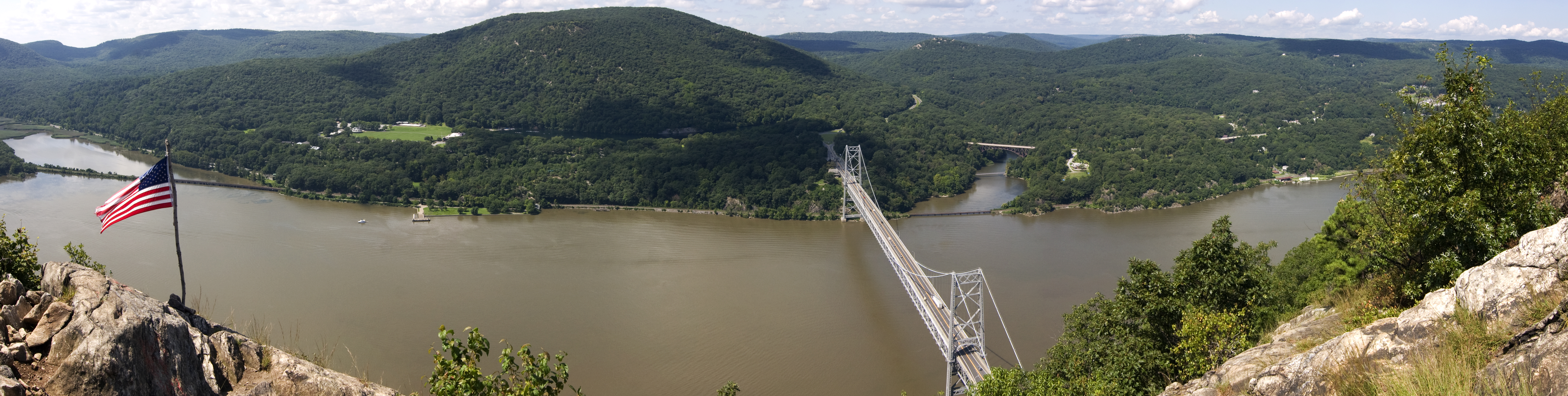
Panoramic view of Bear Mountain Bridge from Anthony's Nose. To the right are three bridges over Popolpen Creek: the Popolopen Railroad Bridge, the Popolopen Pedestrian Bridge and the Popolopen Highway Bridge.

== See also ==
- List of fixed crossings of the Hudson River
- List of bridges and tunnels on the National Register of Historic Places in New York
- National Register of Historic Places listings in Rockland County, New York
- National Register of Historic Places listings in northern Westchester County, New York
