= Johnsontown, New York =

Johnsontown
- Johnsontown in 1895

- Location of Johnsontown in New York
- Coordinates: 41°12′56.88″N 74°7′13.8″W
- Country: United States
- State: New York
- County: Rockland
- Town: Haverstraw

Johnsontown is a former hamlet in the town of Stony Point in Rockland County, New York, United States.

== History ==
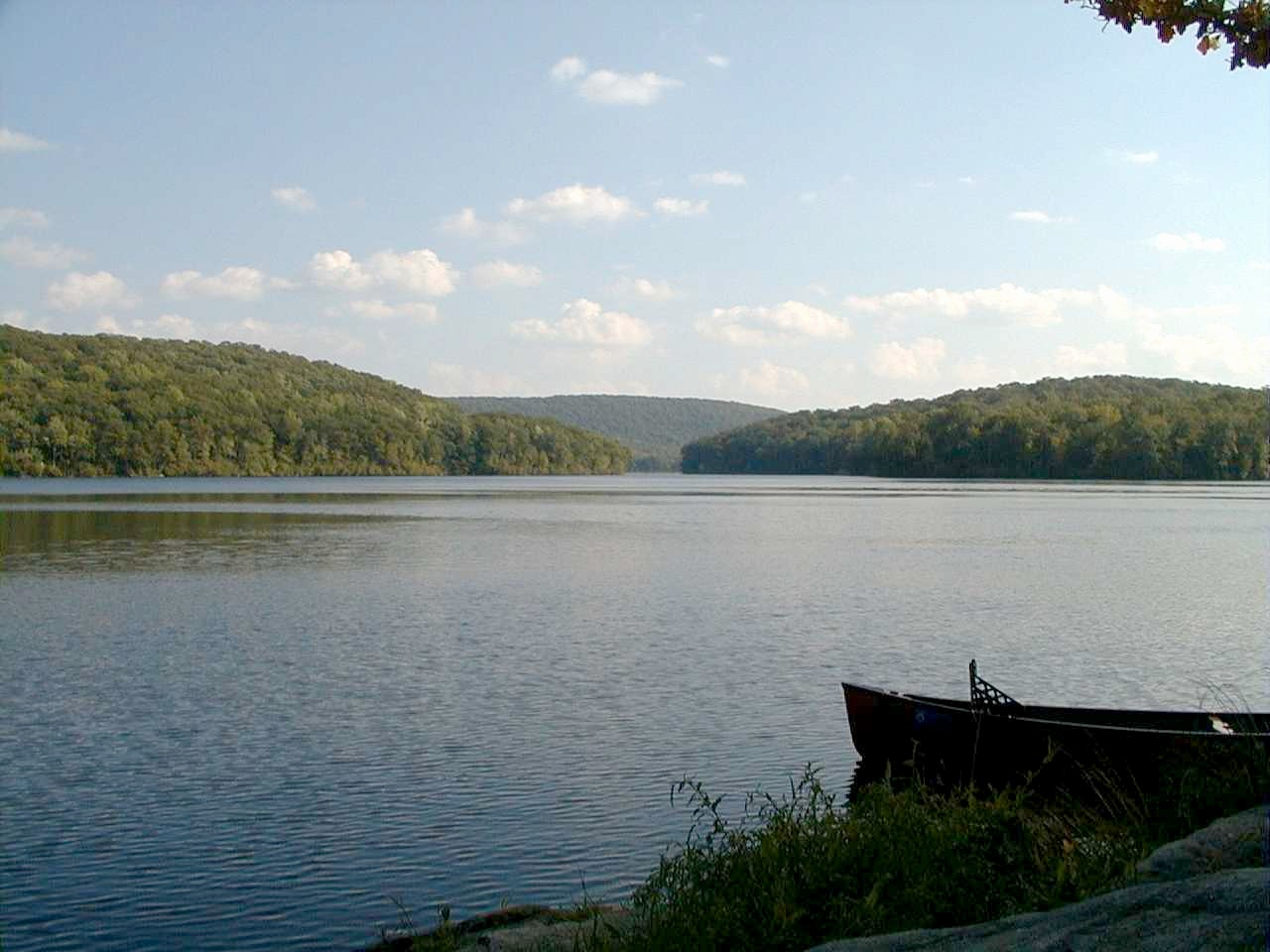
Lake Sebago

Johnsontown was founded in the late 18th century by the Johnson brothers, who came to the mountain area looking for timber to use for shipbuilding. It stretched along what is now known as Lake Sebago and Lake Kanawauke in the western part of Harriman State Park, making it the largest settlement in the Palisades Interstate Park Commission.

== Pine Grove Cemetery ==
Pre-Revolutionary War era Pine Grove Cemetery, a long-forgotten plot approximately a half-acre in size, once marked the center of the hamlet of Johnsontown near what is known today as Lake Sebago in the town of Stony Point.

In the 1920s and 1930s, this hamlet was destroyed by the Palisades Interstate Park Commission by removing a dozen small communities by demolishing their homes, schools, churches, farms and businesses and turning the vacated land into forests, meadows, lakes, picnic groves and swimming facilities. The only remnants left were a handful of stone foundations indicating that buildings had once stood there and the cemetery. Presently, hundreds of descendants of those families live in nearby Stony Point, Tomkins Cove, Fort Montgomery and other adjacent communities.

The cemetery consists of four or five large headstones that were actually carved by a stonemason. The remaining stones are fairly small fieldstones stuck into the ground in upright positions but with no inscriptions of any kind, meaning that there is no way to identify where most of the inhabitants are actually buried. A future goal will be to honor local resident veterans interred in the cemetery from the Revolutionary War through the War of 1812, the Civil War, Spanish–American War and World War I.

Thom Schassler and Florence Anderson, herself a direct descendant of the founding Johnson family and both members of the Historical Society of the Palisades Interstate Park, in 2014 placed a blue and gold metal marker which reads: "This cemetery is in the vanished hamlet of Johnsontown, settled in circa 1750. Earliest burial date 1826. 186 stones are here." Besides placing the marker, historical society members and Palisades Interstate Park System cleared the tremendous amount of underbrush and overgrowth that had virtually obliterated the ancient cemetery over the past century.

== Books and publications ==
- Zimmerman, Linda Rockland County: Century of History
