= Haverstraw, New York =

- Town
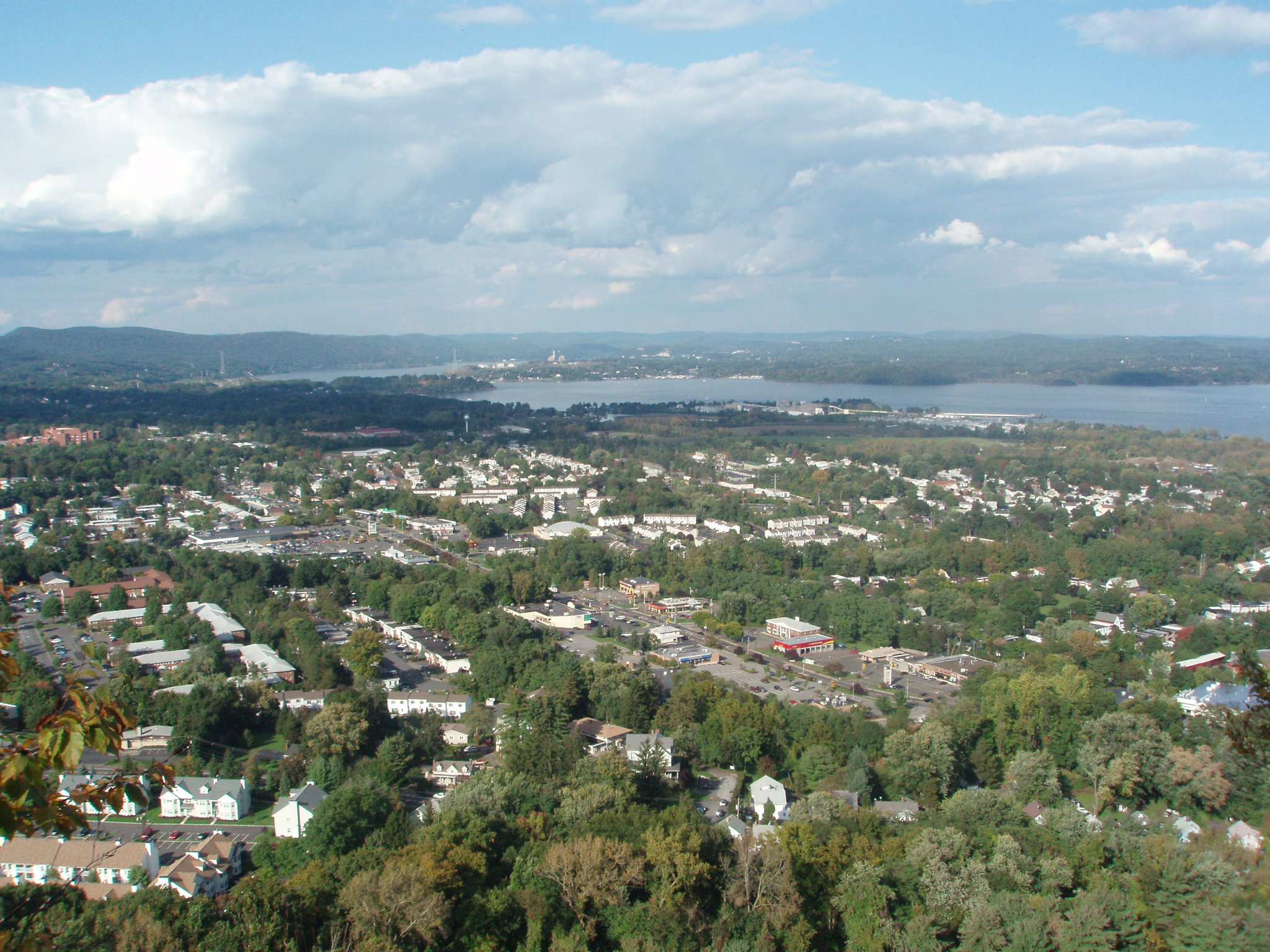
- Skyline

- Seal

- Location in Rockland County and the state of New York.

- Location of Haverstraw in New York
- Coordinates: 41°11′47″N 73°58′01″W
- Country: United States
- State: New York
- County: Rockland
- Settled: 1666
- Established: 1788

Government
  - Supervisor: Howard T. Phillips Jr.
  - Town Council: Isidro Cancel, Vincent J. Gamboli, John J. Gould, and Hector L. Soto

Area
  - Total: 27.41 sq mi (71.00 km^{2})
  - Land: 22.15 sq mi (57.38 km^{2})
  - Water: 5.26 sq mi (13.63 km^{2})

Population (2020)
  - Total: 39,087
- Time zone: UTC-5 (Eastern (EST))
  - Summer (DST): UTC-4 (EDT)
- ZIP code: 10927
- Area code: 845
- FIPS code: 36-087-32765
- Website: www.townofhaverstraw.org

The Town of Haverstraw (English pronunciation: /ˈhæːvəɹstɹɔː/) is a town in Rockland County, New York, United States, located north of the Town of Clarkstown and the Town of Ramapo; east of Orange County; south of the Town of Stony Point; and west of the Hudson River. The town runs from the west to the east border of the county in its northern section. The population was 39,087 at the 2020 census.

The name comes from the Dutch word Haverstroo meaning "oats straw", referring to the grasslands along the river. The town contains three villages, one of which is also known as Haverstraw. Haverstraw village is the original seat of government for the town, hosting the area's historic central downtown business district and the densest population in northern Rockland County.

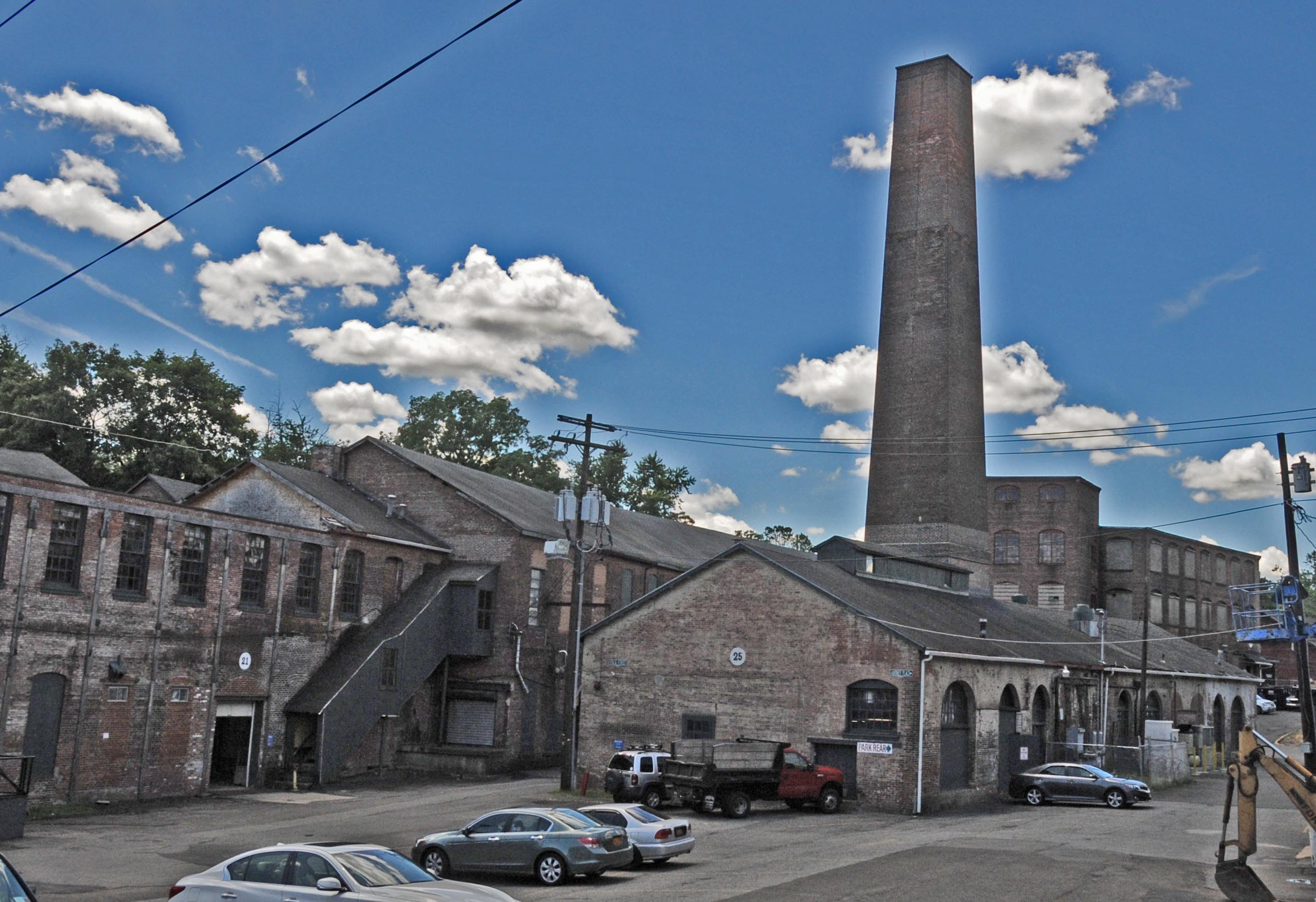
Built in 1828 by the Graner brothers as a calico printing plant 30 building complex - known now as Garnerville Arts and Industrial Center

== History ==
In 1609, the region was explored by Henry Hudson. A land purchase was made in this town in 1666 from local natives and confirmed as a patent in 1671. The region was known as Haverstroo, meaning "oat straw" in Dutch.

During the American Revolution, it served (under the command of Col. Ann Hawkes Hay) as an important lookout for British activities on the Hudson. A blue-marked trail, the Long Path, may be taken 2 miles (3 km) eastward from Central Highway along the crest of South Mountain to High Tor. Halfway is Little Tor, the second highest peak on South Mountain.

The town of Haverstraw was formed in 1788 while still part of Orange County, New York. Haverstraw was partitioned in 1791 to form the town of Clarkstown and the town of Ramapo and again in 1865 to form the town of Stony Point.

In 1826 the town was the site of a short-lived effort to establish an Owenite colony called the Franklin Community. Underfinanced and wracked by internal dissent, the model Owenite community folded after a mere five months of operation.

In 1988, Thomas L. Watson Sr. was elected mayor of Haverstraw, making history as the first African American elected village mayor in New York State. Watson assumed office in January 1989 and served until 1995.

== Geography ==
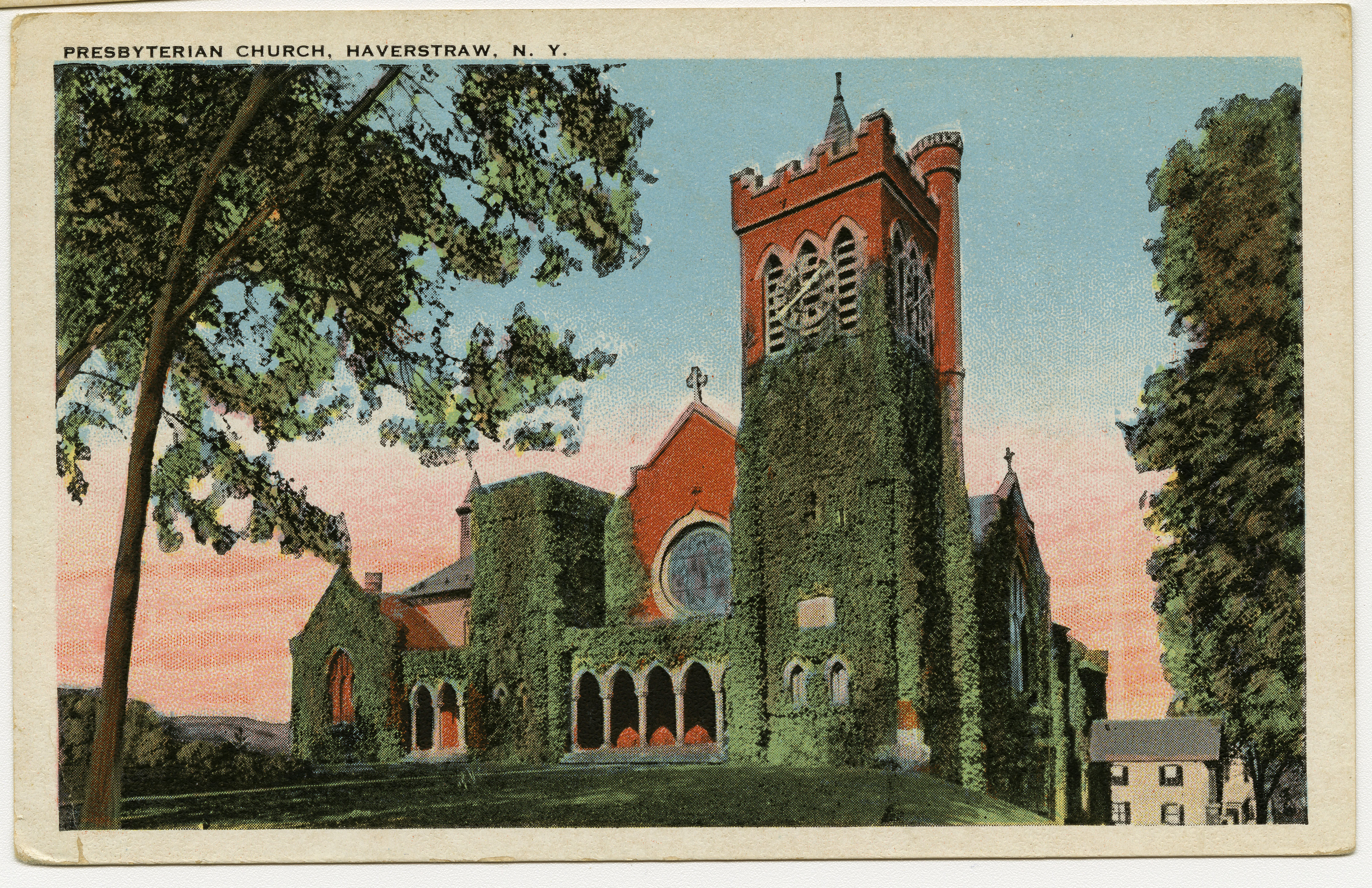
Central Presbyterian Church on a vintage postcard

According to the United States Census Bureau, the town has a total area of 27.4 square miles (71.0 km^{2}), of which 22.2 square miles (57.4 km^{2}) is land and 5.3 square miles (13.6 km^{2}), or 19.19%, is water.

== Demographics ==
Historical population
| Census | Pop. | Note | %± |
|---|---|---|---|
| 1790 | 4,826 | | — |
| 1820 | 2,700 | | — |
| 1830 | 2,306 | | −14.6% |
| 1840 | 3,449 | | 49.6% |
| 1850 | 5,885 | | 70.6% |
| 1860 | 8,123 | | 38.0% |
| 1870 | 6,412 | | −21.1% |
| 1880 | 6,973 | | 8.7% |
| 1890 | 9,079 | | 30.2% |
| 1900 | 9,874 | | 8.8% |
| 1910 | 9,335 | | −5.5% |
| 1920 | 9,027 | | −3.3% |
| 1930 | 11,603 | | 28.5% |
| 1940 | 12,443 | | 7.2% |
| 1950 | 12,979 | | 4.3% |
| 1960 | 16,632 | | 28.1% |
| 1970 | 25,311 | | 52.2% |
| 1980 | 31,929 | | 26.1% |
| 1990 | 32,712 | | 2.5% |
| 2000 | 33,811 | | 3.4% |
| 2010 | 36,634 | | 8.3% |
| 2020 | 39,087 | | 6.7% |
U.S. Decennial Census

As of the census of 2000, there were 33,811 people, 11,255 households, and 8,328 families residing in the town. The population density was 1,508.3 inhabitants per square mile (582.4/km^{2}). There were 11,553 housing units at an average density of 515.4 per square mile (199.0/km^{2}). The racial makeup of the town was 66.24% white, 10.27% black or African American, .41% Native American, 3.21% Asian, .10% Pacific Islander, 15.65% from other races, and 4.12% from two or more races. Hispanic or Latino of any race were 31.73% of the population.

2020 Census
| Race | Percentage |
|---|---|
| White | 31% |
| Black or African American | 14% |
| Asian | 4% |
| Native Hawaiian and Other Pacific Islander | <1% |
| Some other race | 1% |
| Two or more races | 2% |
| Hispanic or Latino (of any race) | 49% |

Haverstraw has one of largest Dominican communities in the United States with Dominicans making up 32.4% of the population

There were 11,255 households, out of which 37.3% had children under the age of 18 living with them, 54.4% were married couples living together, 15.0% had a female householder with no husband present, and 26.0% were non-families. 21.3% of all households were made up of individuals, and 7.8% had someone living alone who was 65 years of age or older. The average household size was 2.94 and the average family size was 3.43.

In the town, the population was spread out, with 26.3% under the age of 18, 8.6% from 18 to 24, 31.2% from 25 to 44, 23.6% from 45 to 64, and 10.3% who were 65 years of age or older. The median age was 35 years. For every 100 females, there were 93.7 males. For every 100 females age 18 and over, there were 89.4 males.

The median income for a household in the town was $53,850, and the median income for a family was $61,119. Males had a median income of $40,109 versus $31,979 for females. The per capita income for the town was $22,188. About 8.1% of families and 10.6% of the population were below the poverty line, including 12.8% of those under age 18 and 13.8% of those age 65 or over.

As of the 2020 census, there were 39,087 people residing in the town.

== Government ==
Haverstraw has a council form of government. The town supervisor is Howard T. Phillips Jr., and council members are Vincent Gamboli, John J. Gould, Hector L. Soto and Isidro "Papo" Cancel. The town's services include a police department.

== Transportation ==
Major highways include the Palisades Interstate Parkway, U.S. Route 9W, U.S. Route 202, and NY Route 45. Haverstraw is also a terminus of the NY Waterway/Metro-North Railroad Haverstraw–Ossining Ferry. Short Line, part of Coach USA, provides daily service along U.S. Route 9W heading to and from the Port Authority Bus Terminal in Midtown Manhattan and West Point Military Academy or Newburgh.

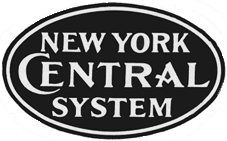
The West Shore Railroad provided commuter service until 1959.

New York Central's West Shore Railroad began operations along the banks of the Hudson in 1883 and until 1958 operated passenger service between Albany and Weehawken Terminal in Weehawken, New Jersey, where passengers could transfer to ferries to Manhattan. Service between West Haverstraw and Weehawken was discontinued in 1959. The right of way is still used for freight and is known as the River Line. Conrail operated the system until its dissolution. It is now part of the CSX River Subdivision which runs between North Bergen Yard in New Jersey and Selkirk, New York.

== Communities and locations in the town ==
- Bowline Point Town Park – A park east of Haverstraw on a peninsula, called Bowline Point, in the Hudson River.
- Garnerville – A hamlet southwest of West Haverstraw.
- Harriman State Park – Part of the park is in the western part of the town.
- Village of Haverstraw – The historic downtown business district. The original seat of government in Haverstraw Town.
- Johnsontown – A hamlet west of West Haverstraw named after the Johnson brothers.
- Ladentown – A hamlet.
- Lake Kanawauke – A lake in Harriman State Park in the southwestern corner of the town.
- Lake Sebago – A lake in Harriman State Park in the southwestern corner of the town.
- Lake Welch – A lake in Harriman State Park near the western town line.
- Mount Ivy – A hamlet by the southern town line.
- Pomona – A village partly in the town and partly in the town of Ramapo.
- Samsondale – A hamlet east of West Haverstraw.
- St. John's in the Wilderness – A hamlet.
- Thiells – A hamlet west of West Haverstraw.
- West Haverstraw – A village.
- Willow Grove – A hamlet on the northern town line.

== Education ==
The Roman Catholic Archdiocese of New York operates Catholic schools in Rockland County. St. Peter Parish School was in Haverstraw. In 2012, after the archdiocese announced that it could potentially be closed, the school community did a fundraising drive as the school was told it could remain open if a plan to raise $500,000 annually was produced. That year the school's per-student cost was $5,500 but it relied on archdiocese funds as it deliberately had tuition below cost, at $3,600, so children of working class backgrounds could attend. It had an increasing enrollment at the time of closure, with 328 students in its final year.

== Notable people ==
- Walter S. Gurnee (1813-1903), served as the 14th Mayor of Chicago (1851-1853), the village of Gurnee, Illinois is named after him.
- Wilson P. Foss Jr., art collector and businessman
- Abram Stevens Hewitt (1822–1903) was a teacher, lawyer, iron manufacturer, U.S. Congressman, and a mayor of New York.
- Molly McGee (1952–1994), gridiron football player
- Marty Springstead, American League Umpire
- Scott Stanford (1977) – WWE Superstars play-by-play announcer working for the Raw brand
- Both the composer Kurt Weill and his wife, the actress and singer Lotte Lenya, are buried in Haverstraw
- Robert Sterling Yard, journalist, environmentalist

Haverstraw was home to three Medal of Honor recipients:

- Nick Erickson, Navy, Spanish–American War
- Michael A. Donaldson, 69th New York, World War I
