= St. John's in the Wilderness, New York =

Settlement in New York, United States

Coordinates: 41°13′23″N 74°05′35″W

St. John's in the Wilderness, located about one mile from Sandyfield, was a settlement in the town of Haverstraw in Rockland County, New York, United States.

== History ==
St. John's in the Wilderness was once was a thriving mission established in 1880. It is the only private land within Harriman State Park.
