= Recreational kayak =

Light boat that is paddled

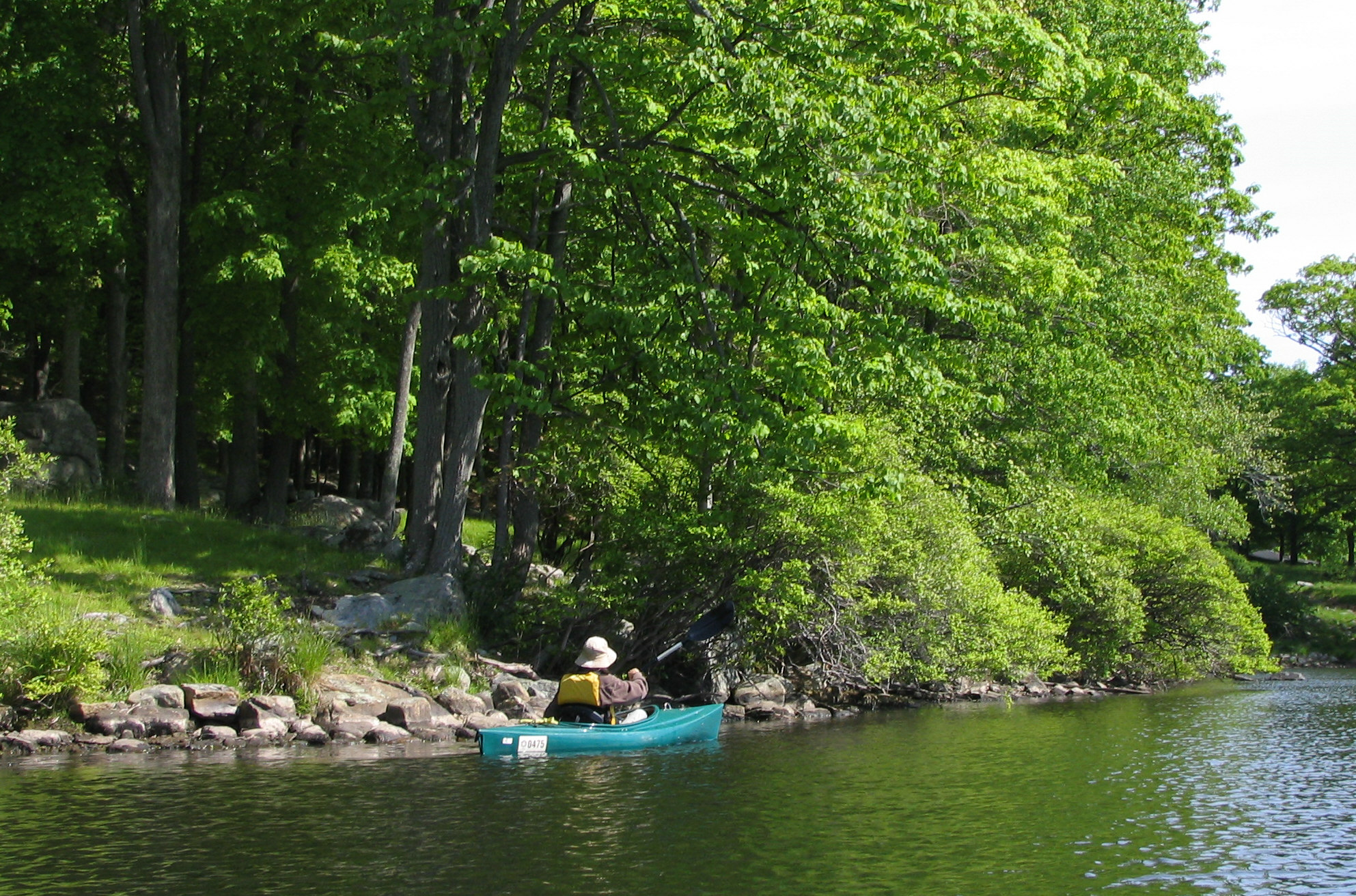
A reactional kayaker on Lake Sebago in New York, USA

A recreational kayak is a type of kayak that is designed for the casual paddler interested in recreational activities on a lake or flatwater stream; they presently make up the largest segment of kayak sales.

== Comparison with other types of kayaks ==
As compared to the other big kayaks, a recreational kayak has characteristics which are different like a larger cockpit that is easy to open, make an entry and exit from. It has a wider beam of about 70–75 cm (27–30 in) for more stability in water and is generally less than 3.7 m (12 ft) in length. This smaller dimensions of the recreational kayak makes it smaller than a longer boat. As compared to the big kayaks, a recreational kayak is light, and thus it is easier to handle both in and out of water. This recreational kayak is cheaper as compared to a big kayak. Since the recreational kayak has a wider hull, recreational kayaks will not track lines, especially straight lines as compared to longer and narrower models. A recreational kayak has limited cargo carrying capacity as compared to a touring kayak. The materials used to manufacture the recreational kayak is rotomolded polyethylene which is less expensive and has fewer options. Recreational kayaks are generally used for flatwater paddling on lakes or Class 1-2 rivers and streams. Fishing kayaks are a type of recreational kayak specialized with rod holders, tackle boxes, and paddle rests. Other models may be inflatable, this can make for easier storage, but would require an air pump to inflate once it is brought to the desired destination.

== See also ==
- Packraft, a portable and inflatable boat for hiking

== Sources ==
- Stuhaug, Dennis O., Kayaking Made Easy: A Manual for Beginner with Tips for the Experienced, Globe Pequot Press, 2006, ISBN 0-7627-3859-6.
