= List of Owenite communities in the United States =

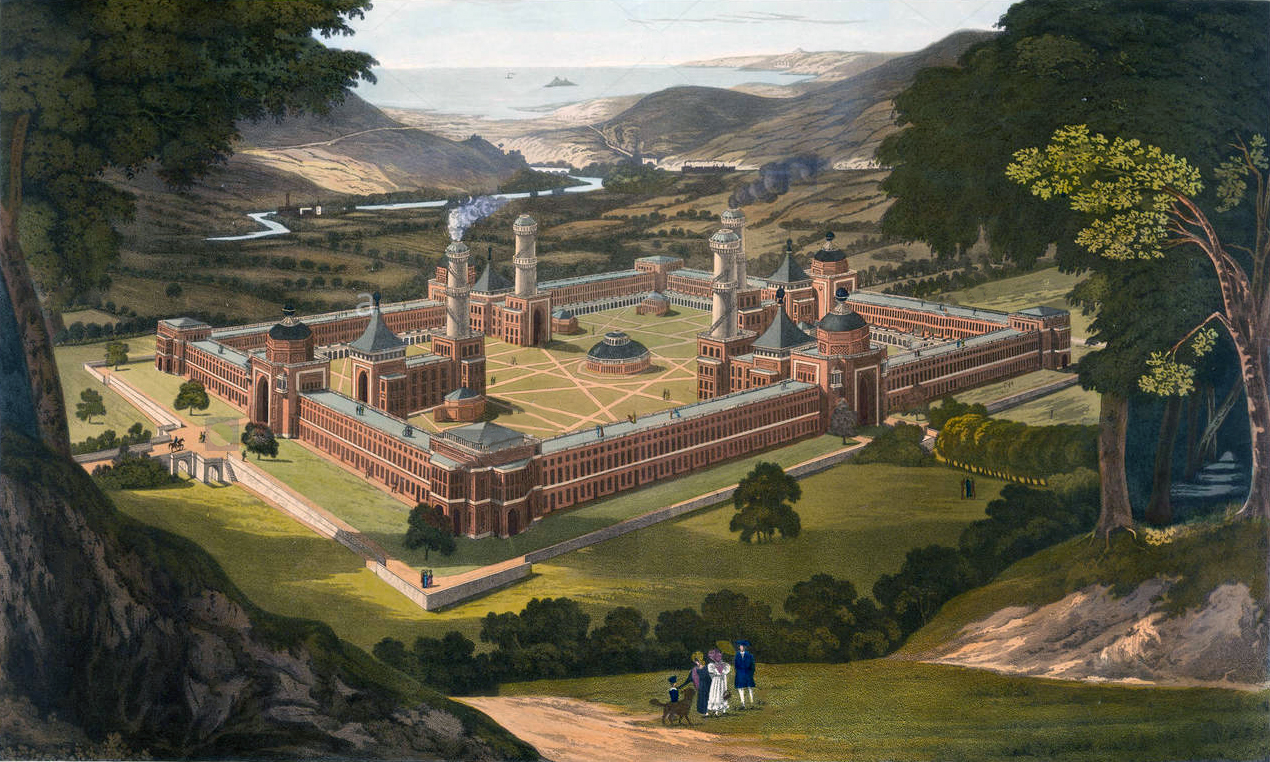
Artist's rendition of Robert Owen's theoretical design of a socialist community.

This is a list of Owenite communities in the United States which emerged during a short period of popularity during the second half of the 1820s. Between 1825 and 1830 more than a dozen such utopian colonies were established in the US, inspired by the ideas of Robert Owen. All of these suffered economic failure and disbandment within a few years.

The Owenite movement of the 1820s was one of the four primary branches of secular utopian socialism in the US during the 19th century, preceding Fourierism (1843–1850), Icarianism (1848–1898), and Bellamyism (1889–1896).

== Background ==
New Harmony, Indiana as it actually appeared, c. 1832.

The communitarian ideas of Welsh reformer Robert Owen (1771–1858) were popularized in the United States by his arrival in America in November 1824. Owen had learned that an already established Rappite religious community at Harmony, Indiana was for sale. He set sail for America with the intention of acquiring it from the Harmony Society and thereby making it a model of his collectivist plans. This initial American community of Owen, a tract of 30,000 acres on the Wabash River which included farmland, dwellings, and factories, would be rechristened "New Harmony" and served as the inspiration for the establishment of other Owenite colonies.

The idea of Owenite communities in the US was boosted by two widely publicized addresses by Owen made before the United States Congress on February 25 and March 7, 1825. The assembled audience included President John Quincy Adams, several members of his cabinet, the justices of the Supreme Court of the United States, and a number of other invited luminaries.

Owen was assisted in the development of New Harmony by Philadelphian William Maclure, himself a wealthy philanthropist as well as the leading American geologist of the day. Other leading American intellectuals participated in the project, including preeminent zoologist Thomas Say, painter Charles Alexandre Lesueur, pedagogue Francis Neef, and Scottish-born feminist and freethinker Frances "Fanny" Wright, among others.

A brief fad followed seeking the realization of Owen's ideas in practice, resulting in the formation of over a dozen Owenite communities. All of these proved short-lived, either owing to internal dissension or an inability to generate a surplus producing manufactured goods and agricultural products sufficient to retire debts incurred. By about 1830 the Owenite movement in America had vanished with little trace, the established village of New Harmony having long since converted to operation on an individualistic basis.

== List ==
Name	Location	Launched	Terminated	Comments
New Harmony	New Harmony, Indiana	May 1825	1827	
Macluria	New Harmony, Indiana	1826	1827	Also known as "No. 2." Splinter group of religious Westerners from New Harmony.
Feiba Peveli	New Harmony, Indiana	1826	???	Also known as "No. 3." Splinter group of English farmers from New Harmony, which survived the original colony's demise.
Blue Spring Community	Monroe County, IN	1826	1827	About seven miles southwest of Bloomington.
Forestville Community	Coxsackie, NY	???	1827	
Franklin Community	Haverstraw, NY	1826	1826	
Kendal Community	Massillon, OH	1826	1829	"Longest life of any Owenite Project." Voted to terminate January 3, 1829.
Nashoba Community	Nashoba, TN	1825	1830	"Emancipation Plantation" conceived by Miss Frances "Fanny" Wright.
Wanborough Community	Wanborough, IL	1826	???	Mentioned in Lockwood (1905) as having been established by May 1826.
Yellow Springs Community	Yellow Springs, OH	1825	1825	Launched in July, terminated end of December 1825. Current home of Antioch College.

Source: T.D. Seymour Bassett, "The Secular Utopian Socialists," pp. 160-167 (unless otherwise noted).

== See also ==
- List of Fourierist Associations in the United States
- Harmony Society
- List of American utopian communities
