= Franklin Community =

- Location of Haverstraw in New York
- Coordinates: 41°11′47″N 73°58′01″W

The Franklin Community was the first American Owenite community established in New York state. Founded in 1826 two miles from the Hudson River near the town of Haverstraw in Rockland County, the enterprise stumbled in its first year of existence and was terminated later that same year.

== History ==
=== Background ===
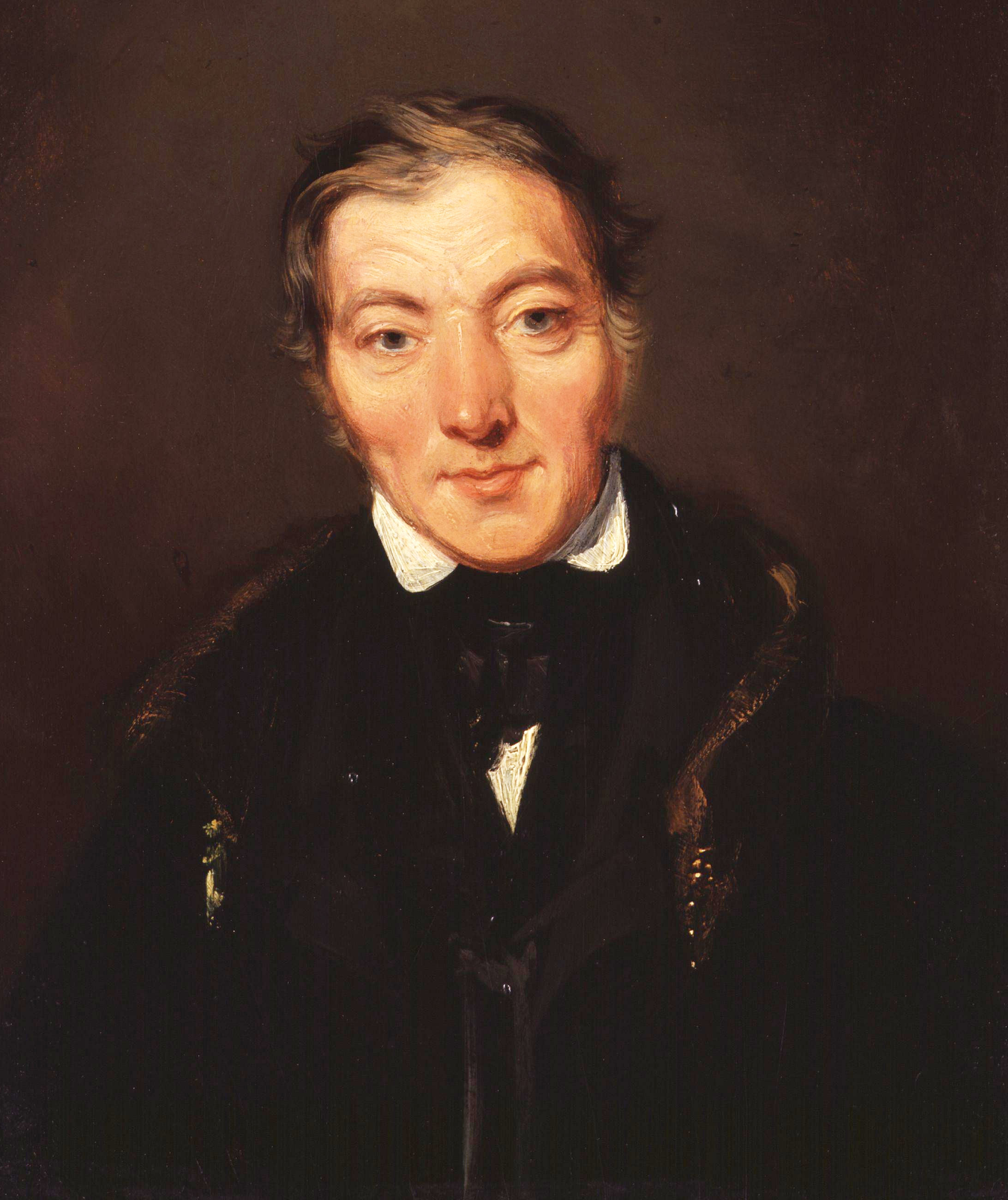
Robert Owen (1771-1858), social theorist who inspired the establishment of Franklin Community.

The arrival of Welsh social reformer Robert Owen on American shores in the fall of 1824 was met with public curiosity and expectation. Owen's ideas about the relationship between human behavior and happiness and the material conditions of their existence were familiar to intellectuals in the United States from about 1817, when they were publicized in various British reviews. In response, those favoring the communitarian ideal had established an organization called the New York Society for Promoting Communities, a group headed by a Quaker apothecary named Cornelius C. Blatchly. It would be Blatchly and his associates who would welcome Owen to New York on November 4, 1824, presenting the visitor with a copy of the group's 1822 publication extracting Owen's writings, Essay on Common Wealths.

A great popular interest surrounded Owen's arrival and subsequent announcement that he had purchased an entire established community in the state of Indiana from the Harmony Society for $140,000, with a view to establishing a model community to test his social theories in the crucible of practice. Despite — or perhaps due to — the distance between New York and the Owenite example on the American frontier in Indiana, interest grew in establishment parallel communities elsewhere.

Despite the existence of the New York Society for Promoting Communities, it would not be the formal authority behind the creation of an Owenite colony; instead it would be a group of committed freethinkers from the New York City area, including atheist leader George Houston, who had previously suffered imprisonment in England for his anti-deist writings.

=== Establishment ===
In the spring of 1826 the Franklin Community was founded, with a preparatory constitution approved in March and a site selected the following month. The site selected was located about two miles from the Hudson River near the town of Haverstraw in Rockland County, New York. Included were 120 or 130 acres of farmland, with a purchase price of $16,000 or $18,000 stipulated. The enterprise was named in honor of Benjamin Franklin (1709-1790), one of the founding fathers of the American republic.

George Houston was named secretary of the new Owenite community. Families began to move in immediately, beginning to farm the land early in May 1826. Many believed that their so-called "sweat equity" (to borrow a modern phrase) would be sufficient to attain membership in the community. Deprived of access to Robert Owen's purse, the fledgling community found it difficult to raise funds, only managing to raise the necessary one-third downpayment on June 23, 1826. A financial restructuring was required and the constitution was altered shortly thereafter to require a cash payment in exchange for community membership — a change which resulted in the great unhappiness of early participants, who felt themselves cheated and robbed of their pioneering labor. 190 years later the house stands today in the town of Haverstraw on the outskirts of the village of West Haverstraw. An article exists in the local paper titled "The short and unhappy life of a backwoods Utopia" by Isabelle Savell

Adding to the discord was the arrival of Houston and his atheist associates, who immediately set about secularizing the community's schools, encouraging Sunday labor in violation of Biblical precepts, and establishing a "Church of Reason" — backing their actions with anti-religious quotations from Robert Owen's written works.

=== Termination and legacy ===
Underfinanced and wracked with discord, the Franklin Community failed about five months after the launch of the venture.

Former secretary of the Franklin Community George Houston would found a new rationalist journal in January 1827, called The Correspondent. Houston would be joined in his editorial task by Abner Kneeland, whose subsequent trial for blasphemy would prove to be one of the landmark political events of the decade of the 1830s.

== See also ==
- List of Owenite communities in the United States
