= Lake Sebago =

Lake in New York, United States

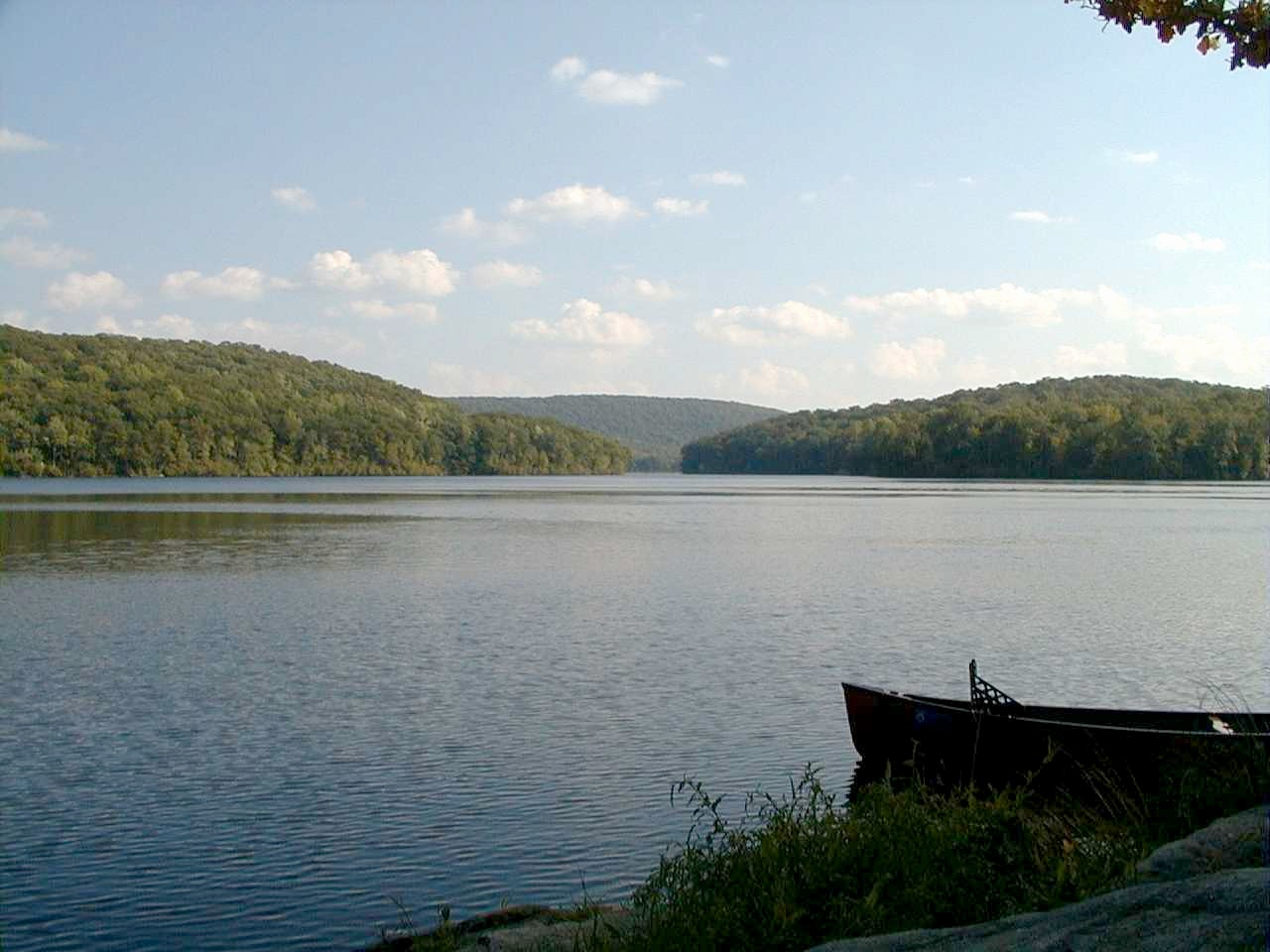
- The lake in 2001

- Location within New York Location within the United States
- Location: Harriman State Park, Rockland County, New York, U.S.
- Coordinates: 41°11′50″N 74°08′08″W
- Etymology: Algonquian word for "big water"
- Primary outflows: Stony Brook
- Basin countries: United States
- First flooded: 1925
- Surface area: 310 acres (1.3 km^{2})
- Surface elevation: 235 m (771 ft)

At 310 acres (1.3 km^{2}), Lake Sebago, near Sloatsburg, is the largest lake in Harriman State Park in the U.S. state of New York. The name is Algonquian for "big water". It is located just south of Lake Kanawauke and is accessible via Seven Lakes Drive and the Palisades Interstate Parkway. New Sebago Beach opened in the 1940s but closed in 2011 due to damage from Hurricane Irene, and the picnic areas closed in 2012 due to Hurricane Sandy. On December 23, 2025, Governor Kathy Hochul announced a reconstruction project of Lake Sebago Beach.

== History ==
The lake was created in 1925 by the Palisades Interstate Park Commission under William A. Welch by building a dam across Stony Brook. The lake filled the former site of Johnsontown—a logging settlement founded in the mid-1700s in the Stony Brook valley. By the early 1900s, Johnsontown was the largest mountain settlement in the western part of the Ramapos.

In 1916–1917, the PIPC condemned the land on the grounds that the settlement was built on swampland ("the great Emmetfield Swamp"). Many homeowners resettled in nearby Sloatsburg. The PIPC took possession of the land and the homes, stores, school and church were torn down before the Stony Brook valley was flooded to create the new lake. Remnants of the Johnsontown sawmill are still visible to scuba divers.

== Activities ==
The Lake, which is operated by the Palisades Interstate Park Commission, is surrounded by picnic lawns and play fields, and is popular with anglers fishing for bass, perch and sunfish. The lake has a hand boat launch and cabin camping.

The American Canoe Association and the New York chapter of the Adirondack Mountain Club have camps on the lake. The latter is named "Nawakwa", and dates to 1926, while the former, originally built for the Rogers Peet Company, was built in 1928 and was taken over by the ACA in 1933.

In 1927, a camp was built for the employees of four New York City banks. In 1986, the camp was turned over to a concessionaire to offer cabin camping to the public. Also in 1927, New York University opened a camp which they used until 1961; its facilities, too, are presently available to the public.

In 2021, Tentrr opened camping sights at the lake.

=== Beach closing ===
On August 27, 2011, Hurricane Irene passed over southern New York leaving the New Sebago Beach ruined and forcing its indefinite closure. The following year, on October 29, 2012, Hurricane Sandy devastated the picnic area around the beach forcing the rest of the park to close. Although two other swimming areas remain open, efforts continued in 2021 to reopen New Sebago Beach.

On December 23, 2025, Governor Kathy Hochul announced a $95.8 million reconstruction project of Lake Sebago Beach, with work expected to start in spring 2026 and completion by summer 2027 and includes "48 acres of beach and surrounding areas".

== Photographs from Lake Sebago ==
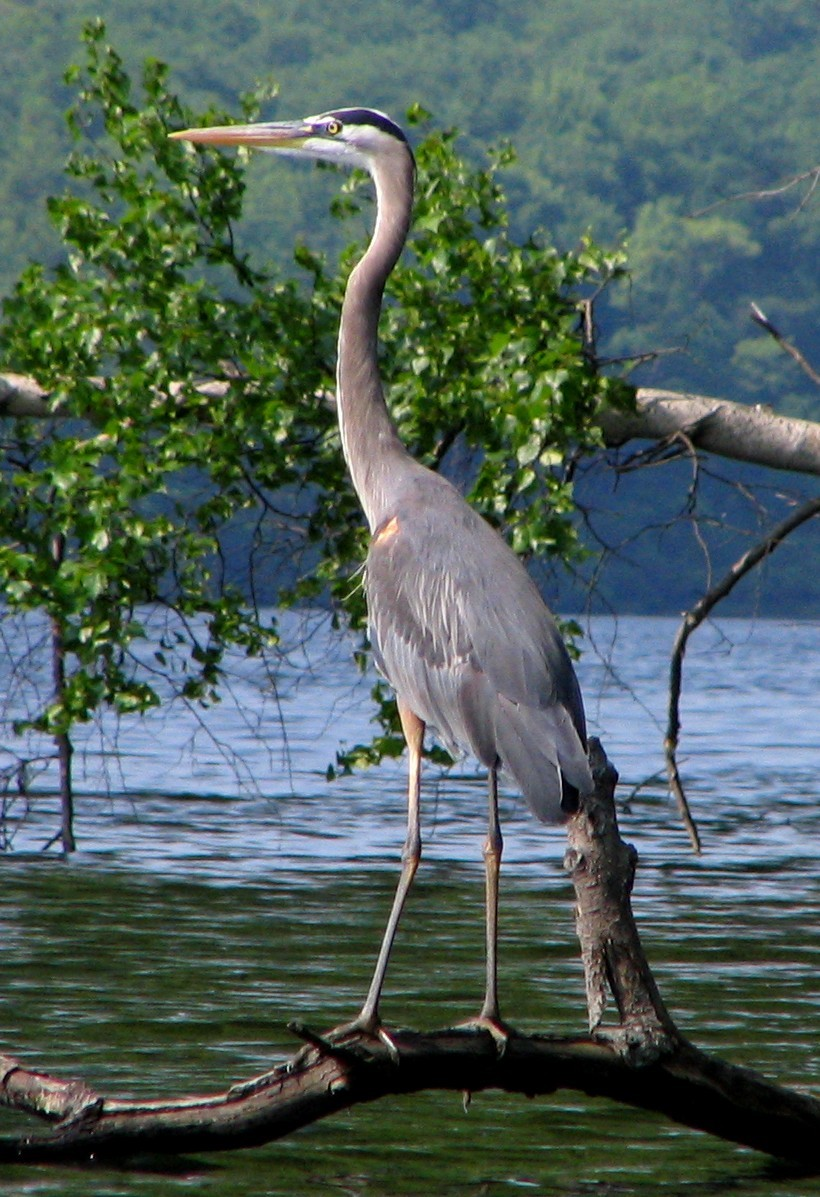
Great blue heron

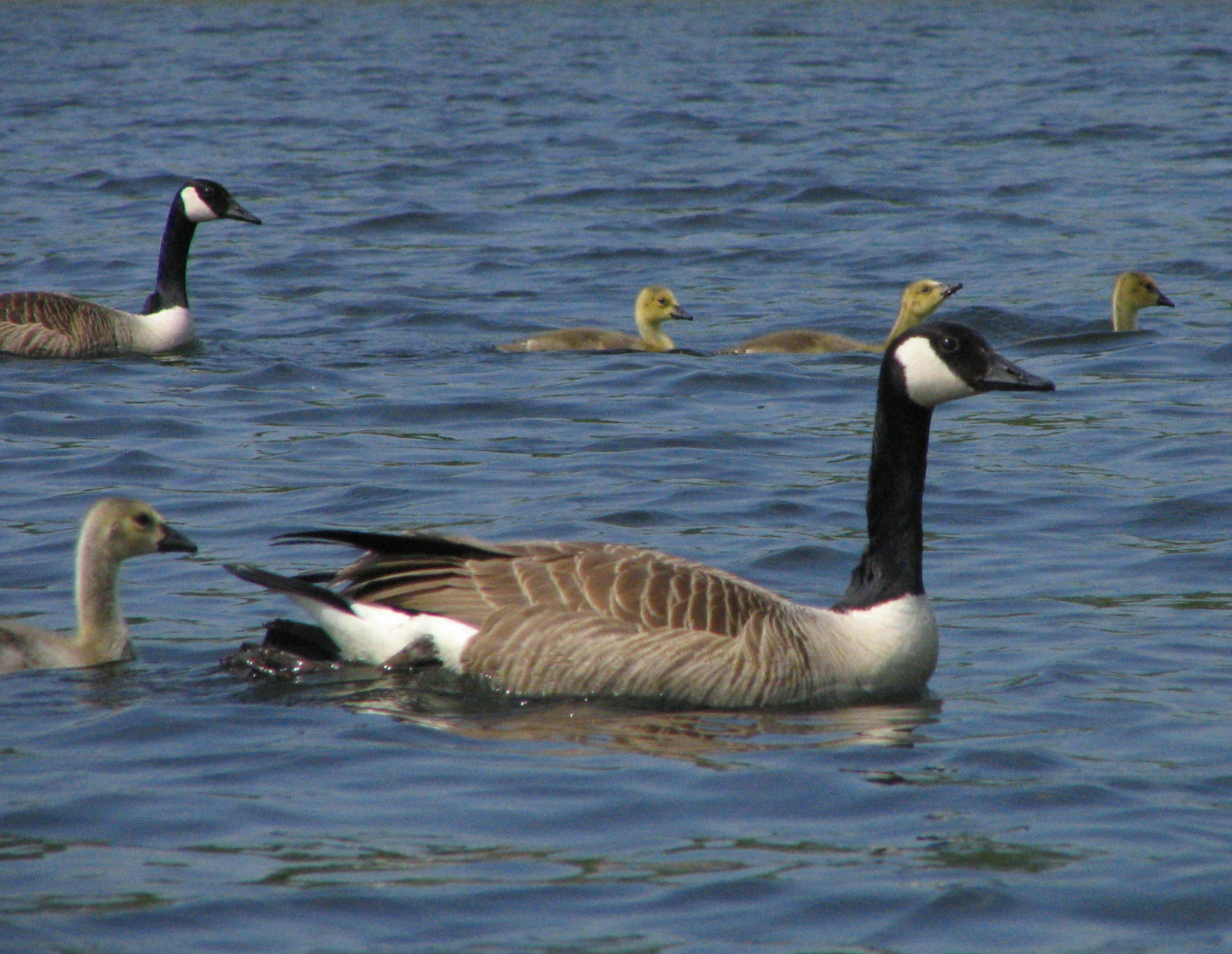
Canada goose with goslings

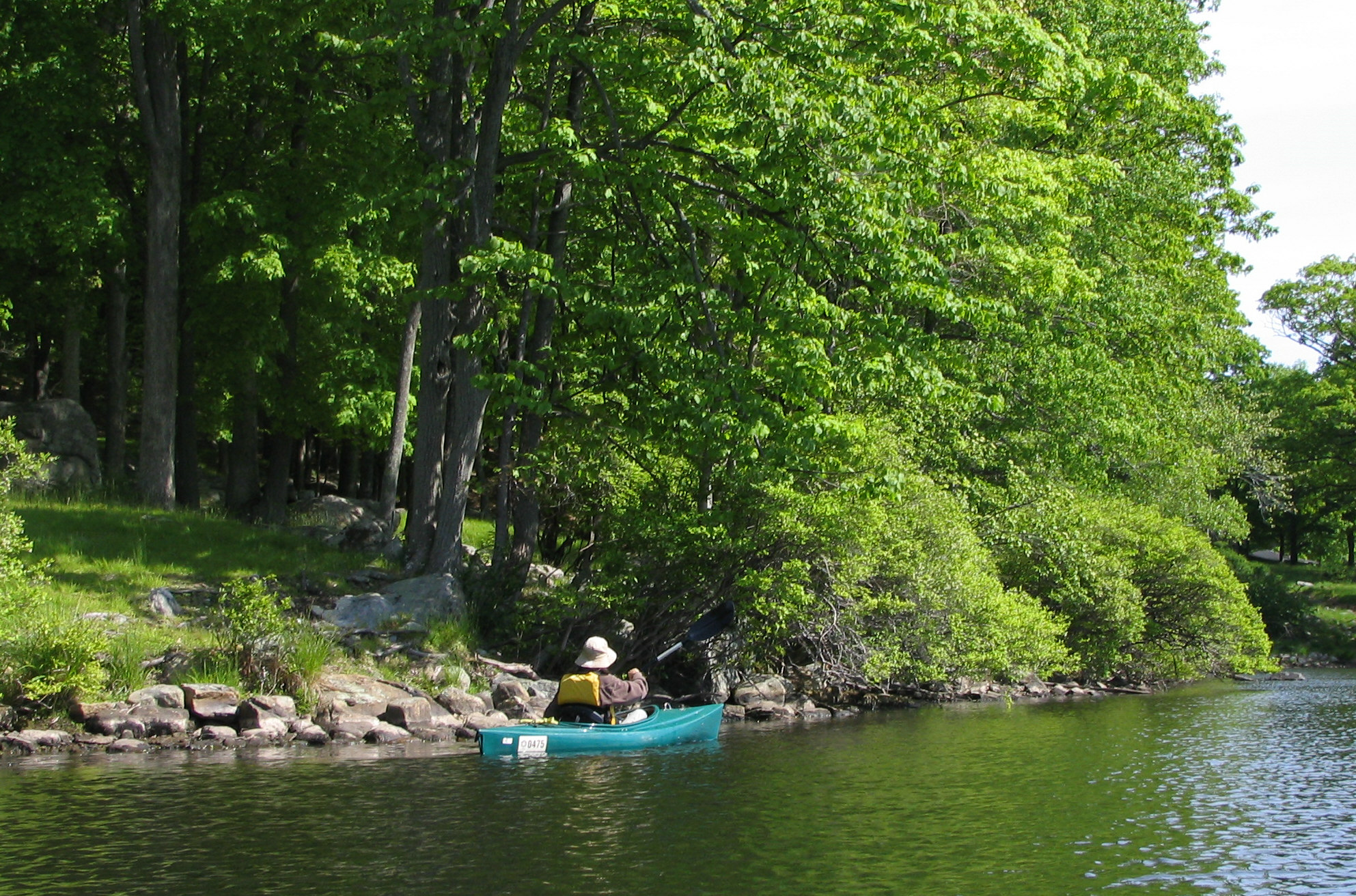
Recreational kayaking

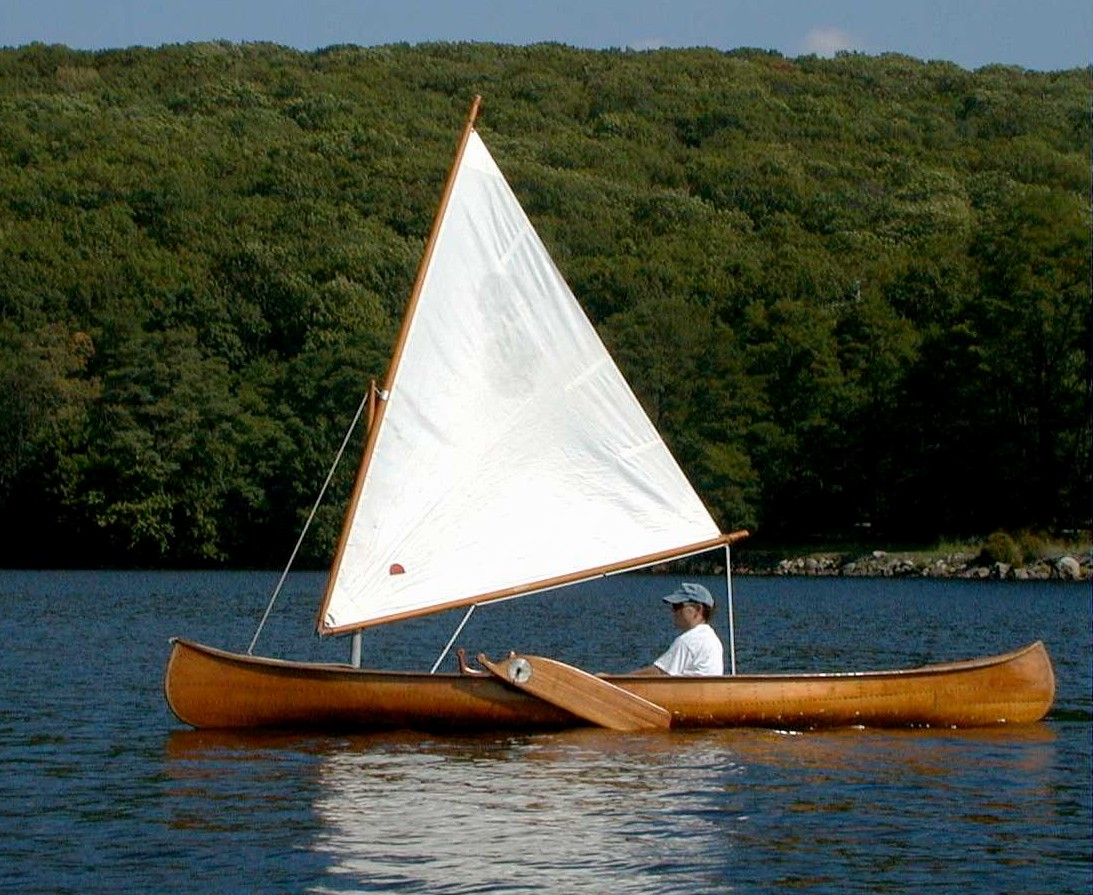
Canoe sailing

== General and cited sources ==
- Myles, William J., Harriman Trails, A Guide and History, The New York-New Jersey Trail Conference, New York, 1999.
- Smeltzer-Stevenot, Marjorie, Old Burying Grounds, Within Harriman and Bear Mountain State Parks, BookMasters, Inc., Ashland, Ohio, 1992.
