= Pine Meadow Lake =

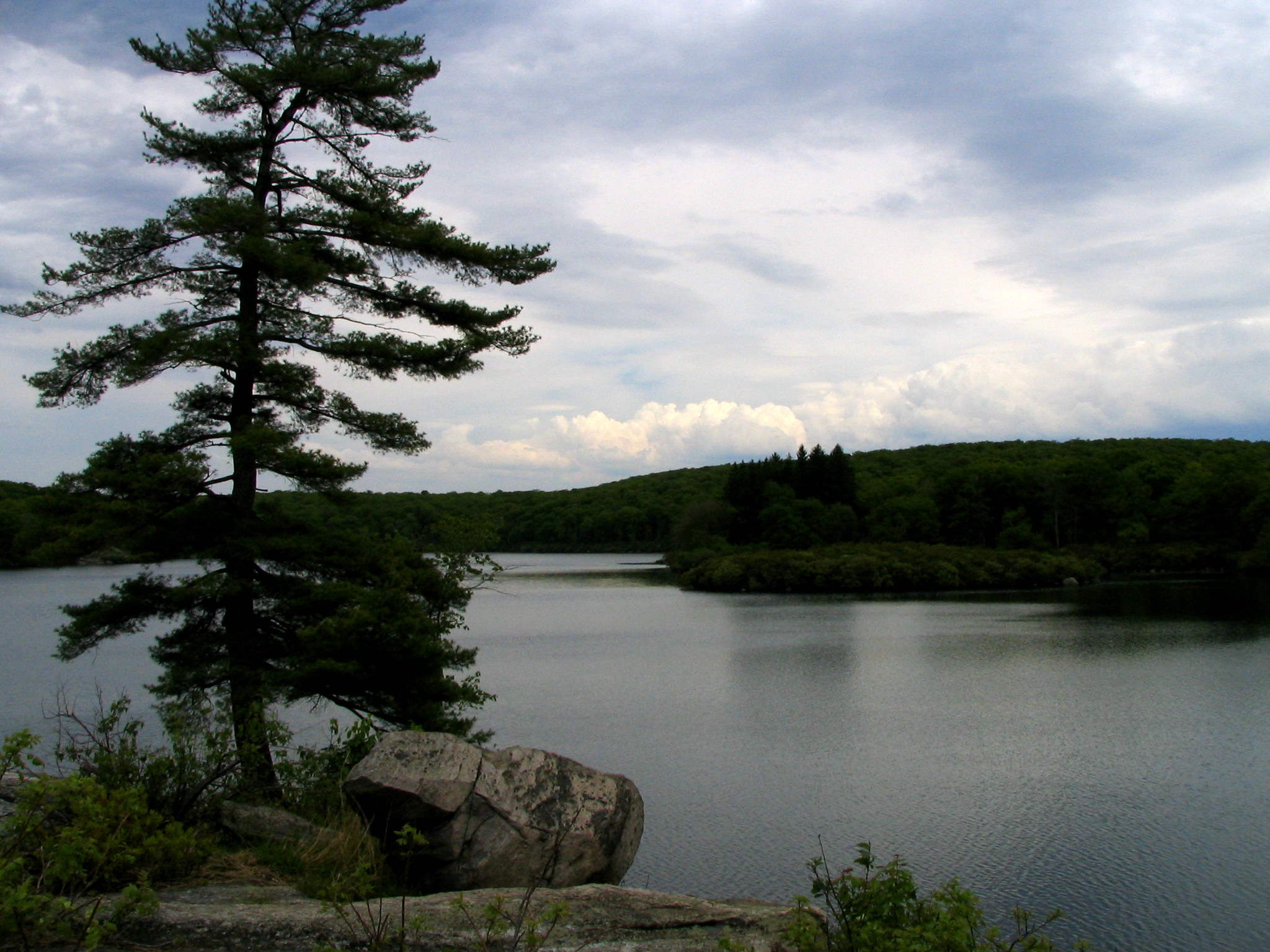

- Location within New York Location within the United States
- Coordinates: 41°10′34″N 74°07′31″W
- Type: lake
- Surface area: 72 acres (0.29 km^{2})
- Surface elevation: 974 feet (297 m)

Pine Meadow Lake is a 72-acre (0.29 km^{2}) lake in Rockland County, New York. It is found at an elevation of 974 feet (297 m). It is located at the end of the 5.5-mile (8.9 km) Pine Meadow Trail in Harriman State Park.

== History ==
The area was inhabited as early as 1724 by Nicholas Conklin, and his descendants had several cabins on the land when the Palisades Interstate Park Commission acquired the land for the Harriman State Park. The dam that created the lake was built by Civilian Conservation Corps labor under William A. Welch of the Park Commission. The lake was built as part of a collection of cabins, roads, a water system and incinerator. Thirty-five camps were planned but most were never built; none exist presently.
