= Tentrr =

Defunct camping rental service

- Industry: Rental, Glamping
- Founded: 2015
- Founder: Michael D'Agostino
- Defunct: 2023
- Fate: Dissolved

Tentrr was an American glamping rental service based in New York. It aspired to be the camping equivalent of Airbnb, at its peak operating over one thousand properties in 43 states.

== History ==
The company was founded in 2015 by Michael D'Agostino, a New York City-based investment banker who had been disappointed by previous camping trips to the Catskill Mountains. He was inspired to leave his job at the New York Stock Exchange and launch Tentrr to rent out individual isolated campsites hosted on private land. Many of the first Tentrr sites were located in areas around Delaware County, New York.

Sites were furnished with a wooden tent platform, chemical toilet, storage box, and canvas tent, with renters supplying their own firewood and bedding. Others were so-called "back-country" locations that were more rustic in their offerings. Many sites were dog-friendly.

Tentrr's sites were initially located on private property and maintained by private property owners the company referred to as "CampKeepers." Louisiana was the first state to officially partner with Tentrr for state park access, followed by New York and Maine in 2021.

In 2018, Tentrr opened a manufacturing headquarters in Oneonta, New York, to produce, package, and distribute equipment for the company's sites. The location was chosen due to its close distance to many existing Tentrr locations. Employees in the Oneonta site manufactured tent platforms, lounge chairs, picnic tables, and other supplies used at the company's rental sites. Along with the Oneonta facility, Tentrr had marketing offices in Kingston, New York, Stroudsburg, Pennsylvania, and Saco, Maine.

While the company saw steady growth in its initial years, demand surged from 2020 to 2021 during the COVID-19 pandemic. The company received numerous complaints about customer service from both campers and hosts, and received the Better Business Bureau's lowest rating.

In January 2023, Tentrr filed for Chapter 11 bankruptcy, saying it had "expanded quickly due to increased demand during the coronavirus pandemic" but "demand has not kept up...causing a cash flow problem." It said the filing was meant as a path to renegotiate an equipment lease with Farnam Street Financial. A court order was filed on 20 December 2023, converting the case from a Chapter 11 restructuring to a Chapter 7 liquidation.
