= Lake Kanawauke =

Artificial lake in Harriman State Park

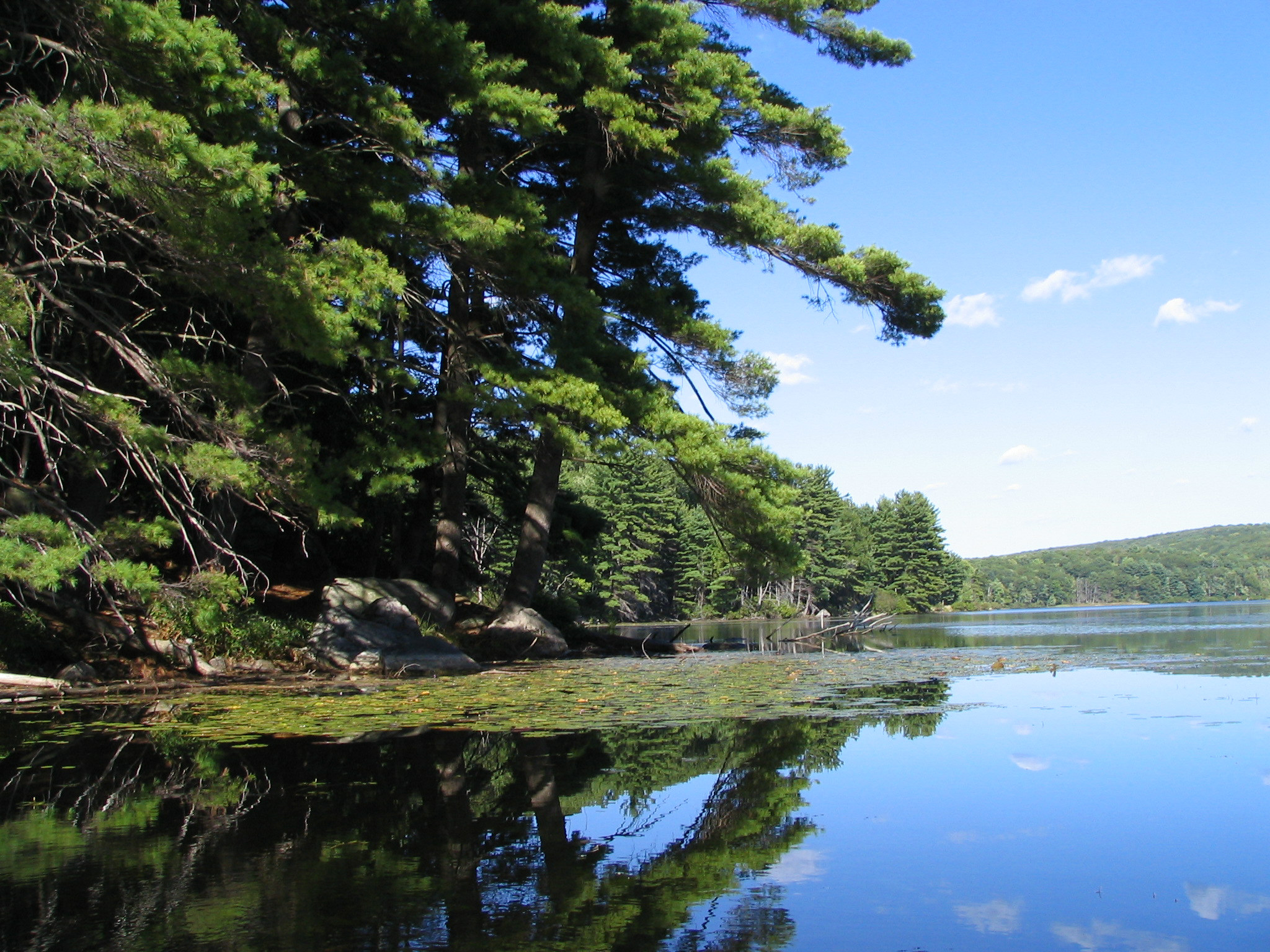
- Middle Lake Kanawauke

- Location within New York
- Location: Orange / Rockland counties, New York, United States
- Coordinates: 41°13′15″N 74°07′33″W
- Basin countries: United States
- Surface area: 186 acres (75 ha)
- Surface elevation: 810 ft (247 m)

Lake Kanawauke is a primarily human-made lake in Harriman State Park. The name is Onondaga in origin, and means "place of much water". There are three parts to the lake, lower, middle and upper; the total area is 186 acres (0.75 km^{2}). It is located in the Town of Tuxedo in Orange County and the Town of Haverstraw in Rockland County, both residing within the state of New York.

== History ==
The lakes were built by the Palisades Interstate Park Commission under William A. Welch.

Lower Kanawauke was built in 1915 by damming Stony Brook. It was used by the Boy Scouts for camping; by 1930 there were fourteen camps on the lake.

Middle Kanawauke was built in 1916 by damming Stillwater Creek. It was used by the Brooklyn Boy Scouts, who erected six camps and built the 35-mile (56 km) White Bar trail system centered on the lake.

Upper Kanawauke is the only natural lake of the three. In the mid-nineteenth century there was a small settlement on the lake shore. Seven Boy Scout camps were built around the lake starting in 1917, one of which became a Girl Scout camp, Camp Quid Nunc (Latin for "What now").

Currently there is a public picnic area and permit boat launch located west of Kanawauke Circle along Seven Lakes Drive.
