= Harriman State Park (New York) =

State park of New York state, United States

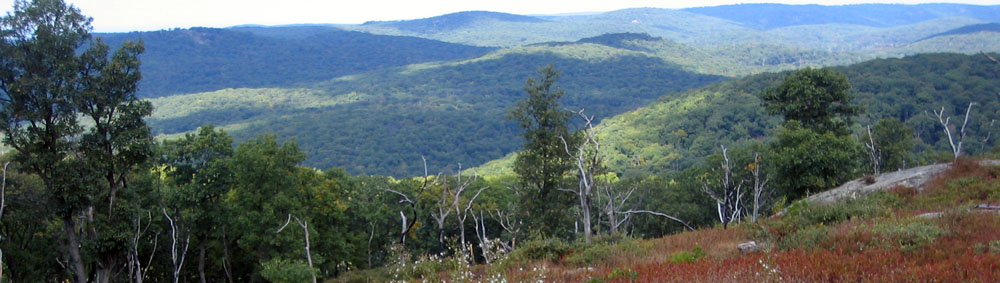
- View from Harriman State Park, facing north

- Location within New York
- Location: Orange / Rockland counties, New York, United States
- Coordinates: 41°14′35″N 74°06′02″W
- Area: 48,556 acres (19,650 ha)
- Established: 1910
- Visitors: 1,425,000 (in 2014)
- Governing body: Palisades Interstate Park Commission

Harriman State Park is a 48,556-acre (196.50 km^{2}) state park in the U.S. state of New York. Located in Rockland and Orange counties 30 miles (48 km) north of New York City, it is the state's second largest, and features 31 lakes, multiple streams, public camping area, and great vistas. Its over 200 miles (320 km) of trails, maintained by volunteers from the New York–New Jersey Trail Conference, are a haven for hikers.

On its northeastern edge, Harriman State Park borders the 5,000-acre (20 km^{2}) Bear Mountain State Park and the United States Military Academy's 16,000-acre (65 km^{2}) forest reserve. To the southwest, it partly borders the state-owned 22,000-acre (89 km^{2}) Sterling Forest reserve. Together with the state's 1,900-acre (7.7 km^{2}) Storm King, these contiguous protected forests are almost as large as Harriman alone.

Harriman State Park in autumn, Lake Nawahunta, 2026

== History ==
Mary Harriman Rumsey, daughter of E. H. and Mary Averell Harriman

Edward Harriman and Mary Averell Harriman owned 30,000 acres (120 km^{2}) in Arden, New York as part of their estate. They opposed the state's decision to build a prison at Bear Mountain and wanted to donate some of their land to the state in order to build a park. A year after the death of her husband in 1909, Mary Harriman proposed to Governor Charles Evans Hughes that she would donate 10,000 acres (40 km^{2}) of land and $1 million for the creation of a new state park. As part of the deal, the state would do away with the plan to build the prison, appropriate an additional $2.5 million to acquire additional land and construct park facilities. The Palisades Interstate Park Commission would have its authority extended north into the Ramapo Mountains and the Hudson Highlands, and New Jersey would also contribute an amount of money deemed reasonable by the Commission. The state agreed and on October 29, 1910, Harriman's son W. Averell Harriman presented a deed for the land and a million-dollar check to the Commission.

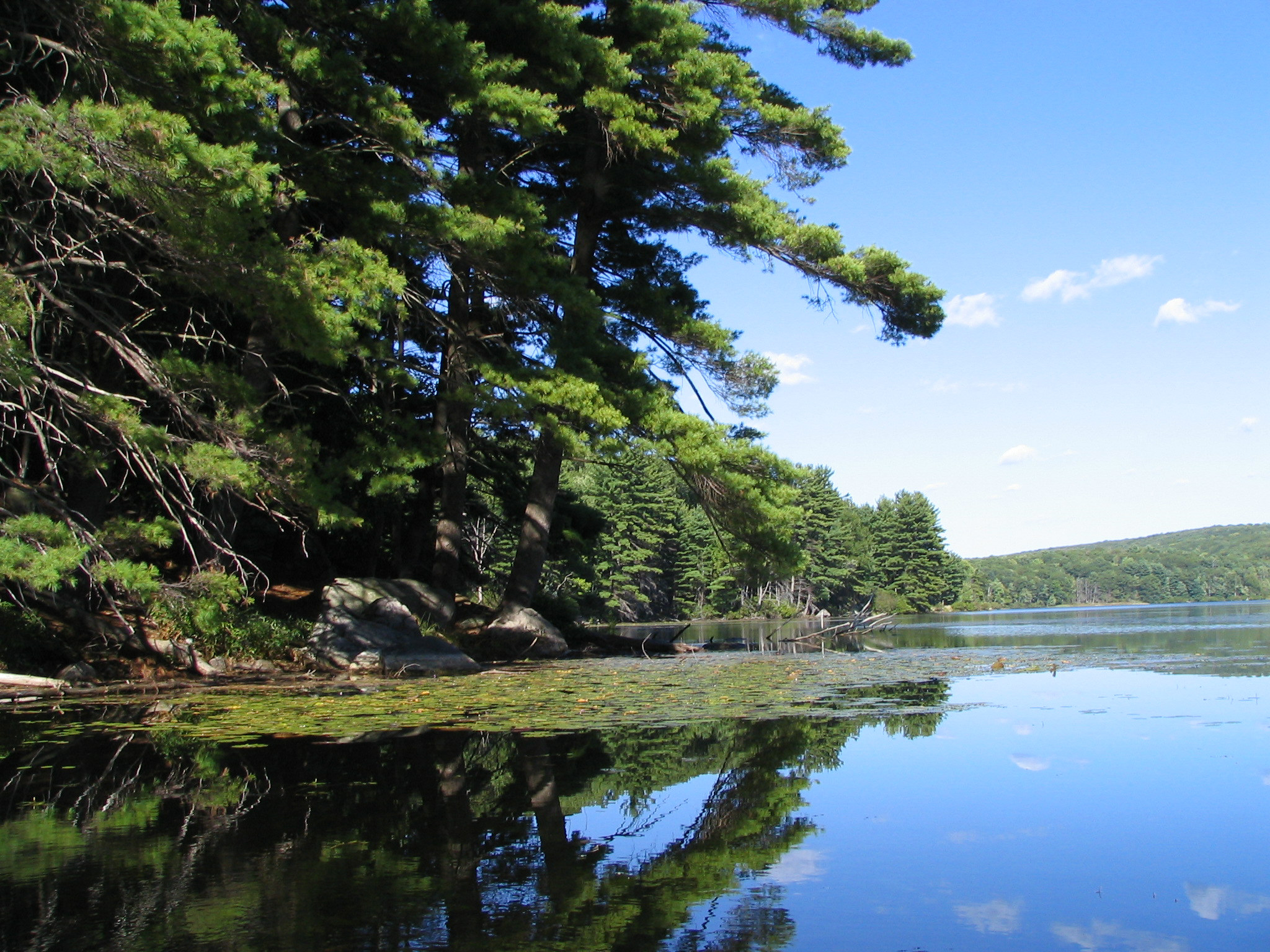
Lake Kanawauke

In 1913, Major William A. Welch started construction on the road from Bear Mountain to Sloatsburg, known today as the Seven Lakes Drive. In 1962 a new road from the Southfields section of Tuxedo to Kanawake Circle was opened. There were also numerous other roads completed around Bear Mountain and Dunderberg Mountain in order to make it easier for people to reach the new park. In addition, there was steamboat service from Manhattan offering round-trip tickets for 85 cents for adults and 45 cents for children.

The park received a large influx of free labor during the Great Depression. The Civilian Conservation Corps (CCC) offered thousands of young men work such as building roads, trails, camps and lakes. Projects completed by the CCC in the park included Pine Meadow, Wanoksink, Turkey Hill, Welch, Silvermine and Massawippa Lakes. In 1974, Northwest Orient Airlines Flight 6231 crashed in the park. In 1993, the World Orienteering Championships were held at Harriman State Park.

== Trails ==
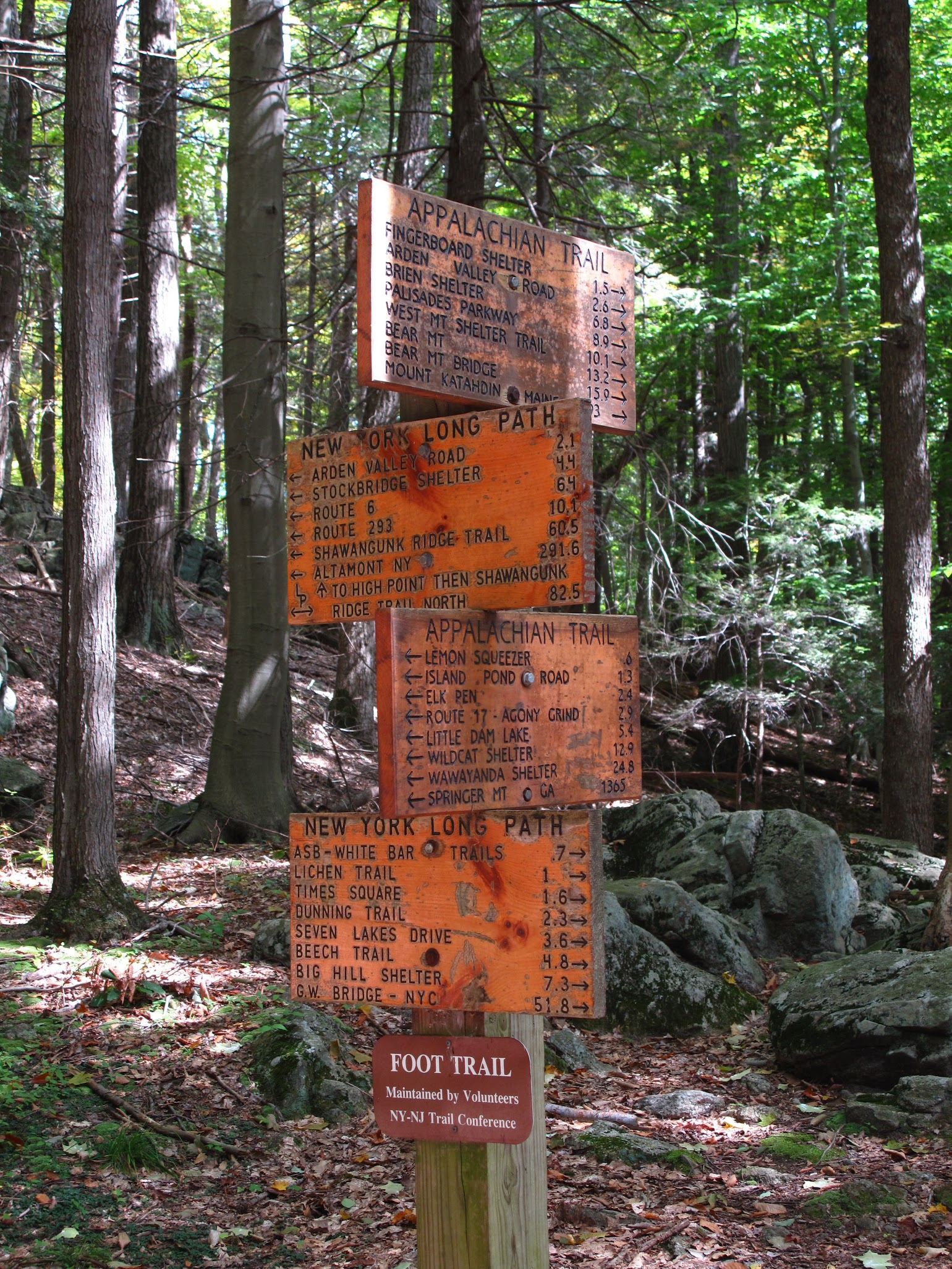
Crossing of Appalachian Trail and Long Path (2013)

There are more than forty marked hiking trails (225 mi (362 km) total) in Harriman, and another 57 unmarked trails and woods road (103 mi (166 km), foot traffic only). Some of the better known trails include the following:

- Appalachian Trail, 18.8 miles (30.3 km) are within the park
- Blue Disc Trail, 2.8 miles (4.5 km)
- Long Path, 25 miles (40 km) are within the park
- Pine Meadow Trail, 5.5 miles (8.9 km)
- Ramapo-Dunderberg Trail, 21 miles (34 km)
- Red Cross Trail, 7.9 miles (12.7 km)
- Seven Hills Trail, 6.7 miles (10.8 km)
- Suffern-Bear Mountain Trail, 23.5 miles (37.8 km)
- Timp-Torne Trail, 11.2 miles (18.0 km)
- Tuxedo-Mt Ivy Trail, 8.2 miles (13.2 km)
- White Bar Trail, 7.4 miles (11.9 km)

In addition to the hiking trails there are a number of horse trails in the southeastern portion of the park and a mountain bike trail at the Anthony Wayne Recreation Area in the northeast of the park. In winter some of the trails are open for cross-country skiing. The hiking trails are maintained by the New York - New Jersey Trail Conference.

== Environment ==
The park lies within the Northeastern coastal forests ecoregion.

== Lakes ==
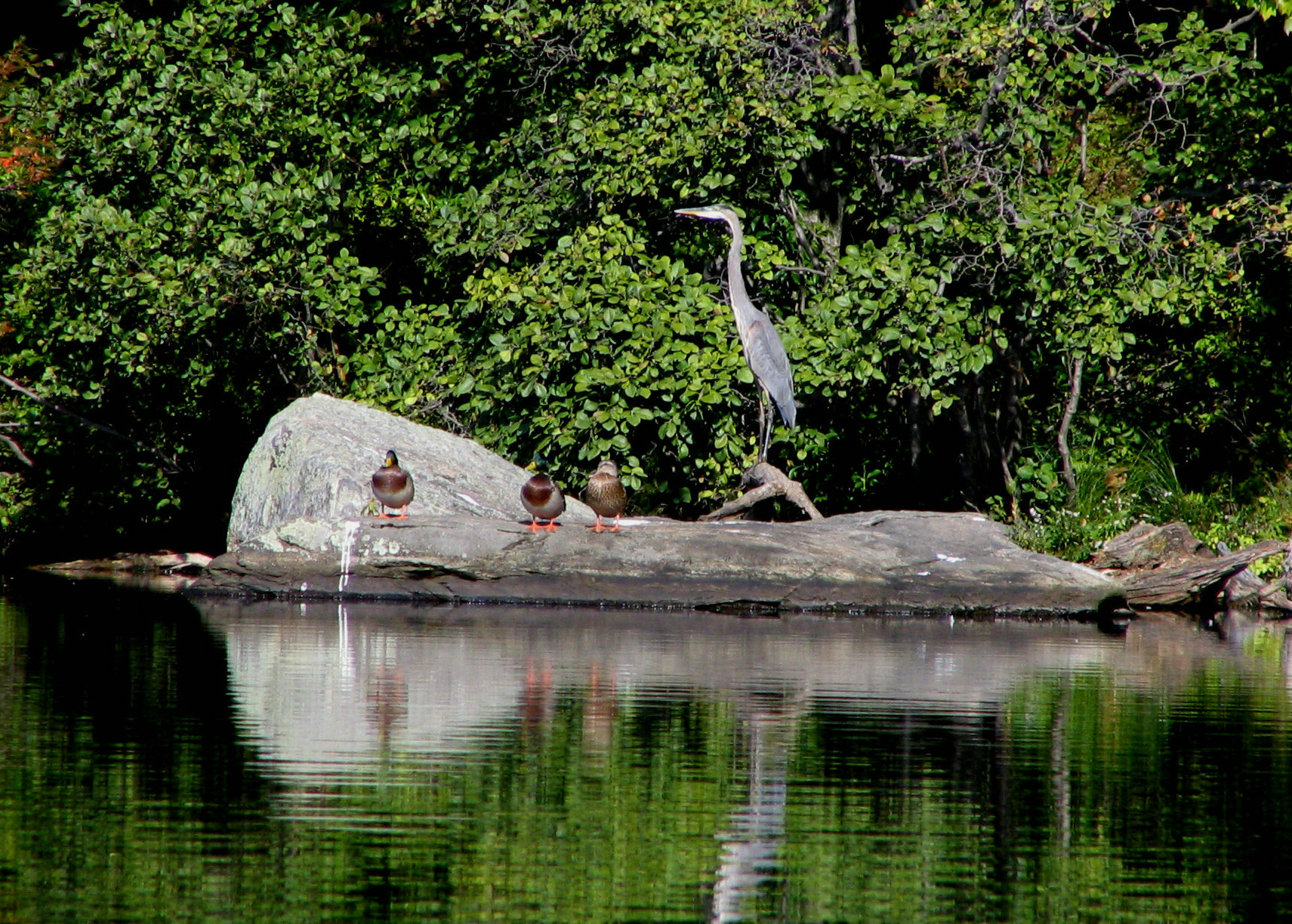
Great blue heron and mallards at Silvermine Lake

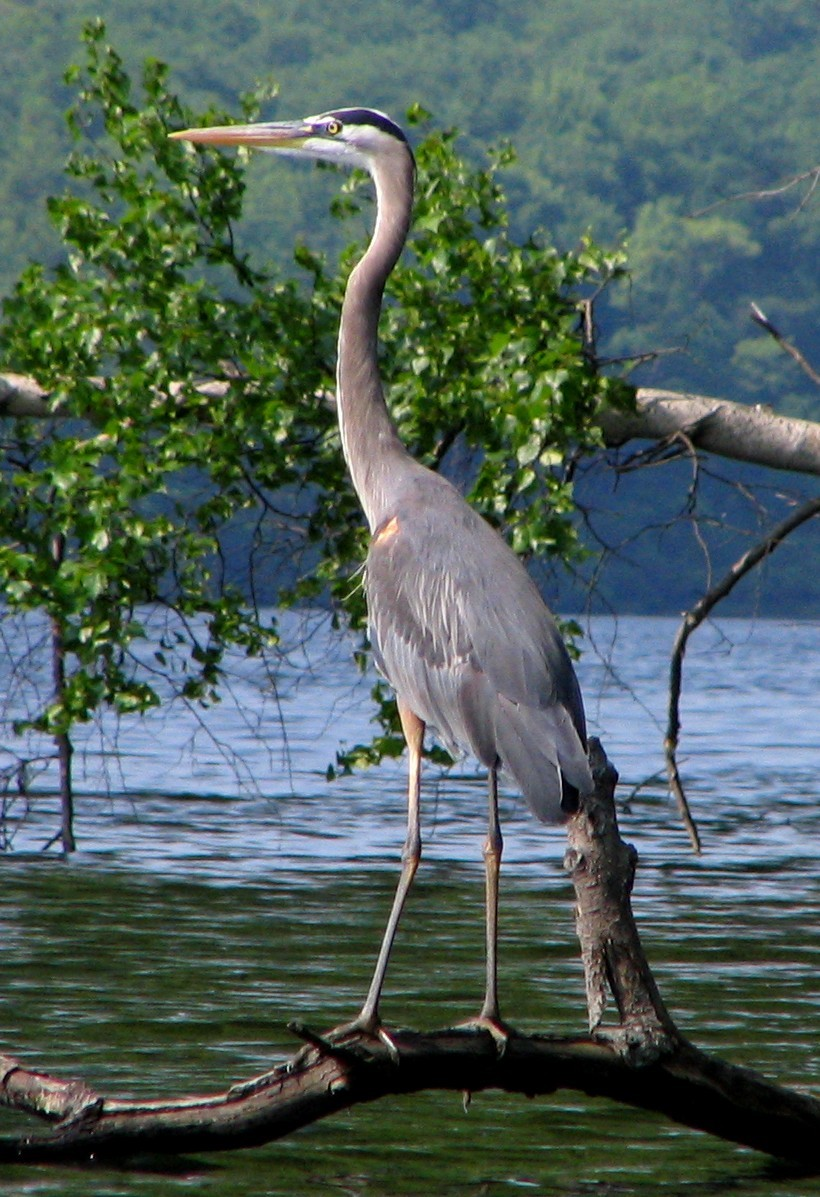
Great blue heron at Sebago Lake

There are 32 lakes and ponds in Harriman. Some of the larger ones are:

- Lake Sebago, 310 acres (1.3 km^{2}), boat launch, cabin camping
- Lake Tiorati, 291 acres (1.18 km^{2}), swimming beach, boat launch
- Lake Welch, 216 acres (0.87 km^{2}), swimming beach, camping
- Lake Kanawauke (lower, middle and upper), 186 acres (0.75 km^{2})
- Lake Stahahe, 88 acres (360,000 m^{2})
- Silver Mine Lake, 84 acres (340,000 m^{2})
- Pine Meadow Lake, 77 acres (310,000 m^{2})
- Turkey Hill Lake, 58 acres (230,000 m^{2})
- Island Pond, 51 acres (210,000 m^{2})
- Lake Askoti, 41 acres (170,000 m^{2})
- Lake Skanatati, 38 acres (150,000 m^{2})
- Lake Wanoksink, 38 acres (150,000 m^{2})
- Lake Skenonto, 37 acres (150,000 m^{2})
- Queensboro Lake, 35 acres (140,000 m^{2})
- Hessian Lake, 33 acres (130,000 m^{2})
- Summit Lake, 33 acres (130,000 m^{2})
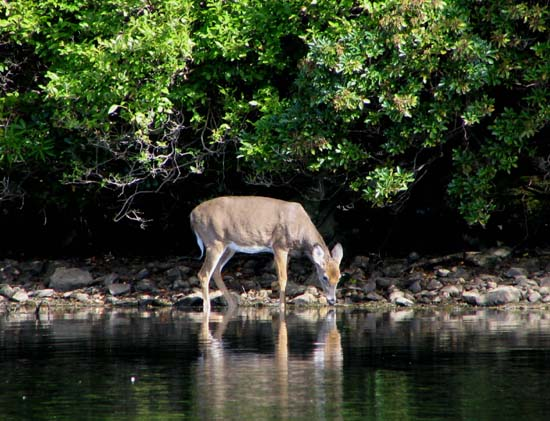
White-tailed deer at Lake Sebago

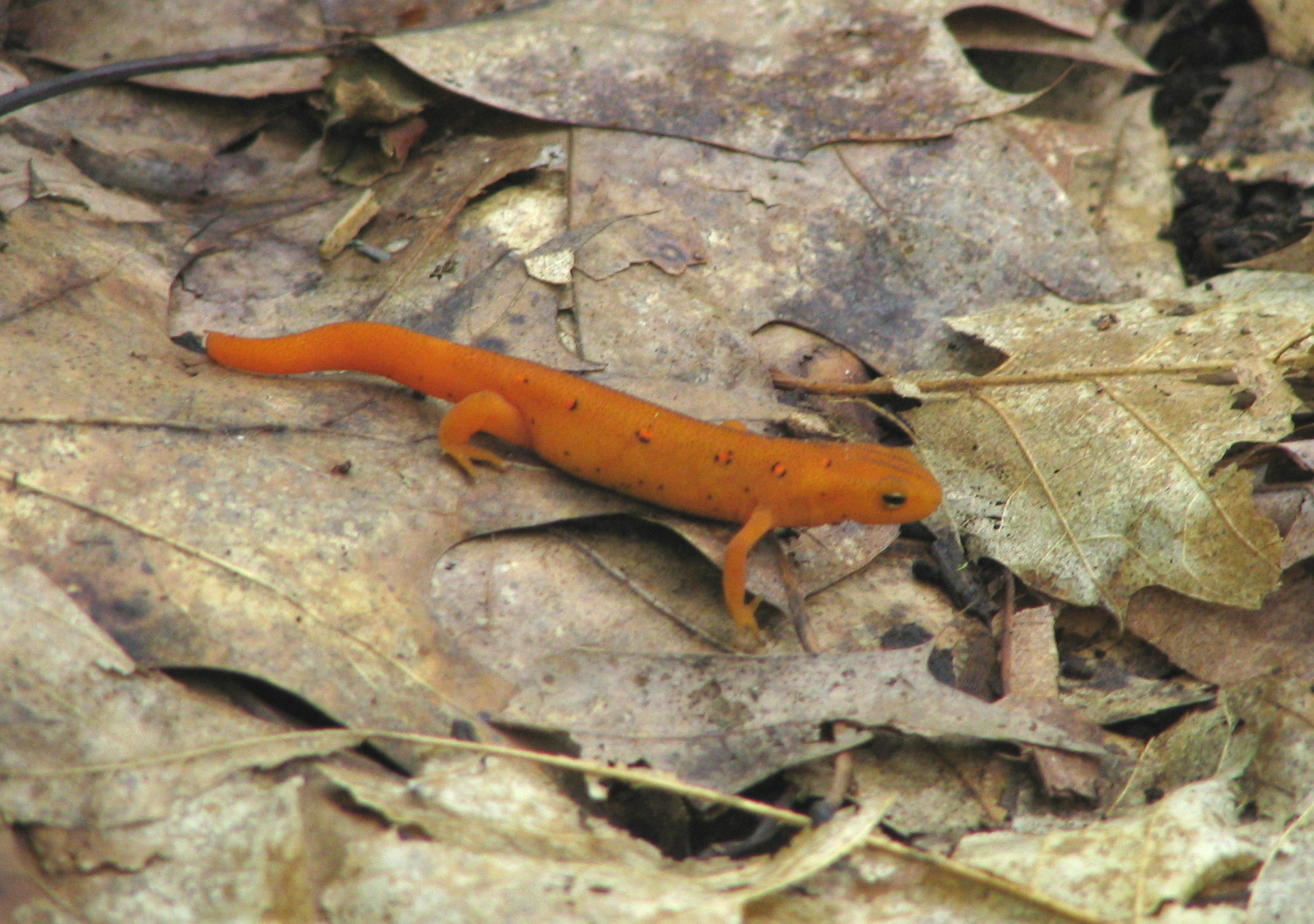
Red eft on the Suffern-Bear Mountain Trail

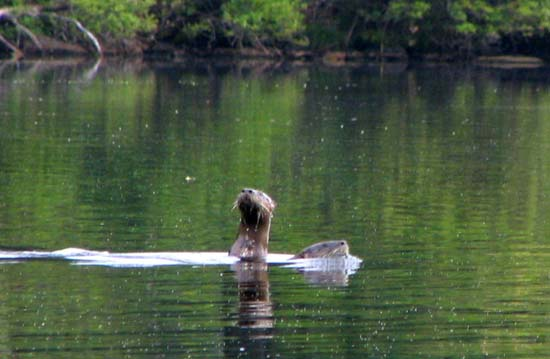
River otter at Lake Sebago

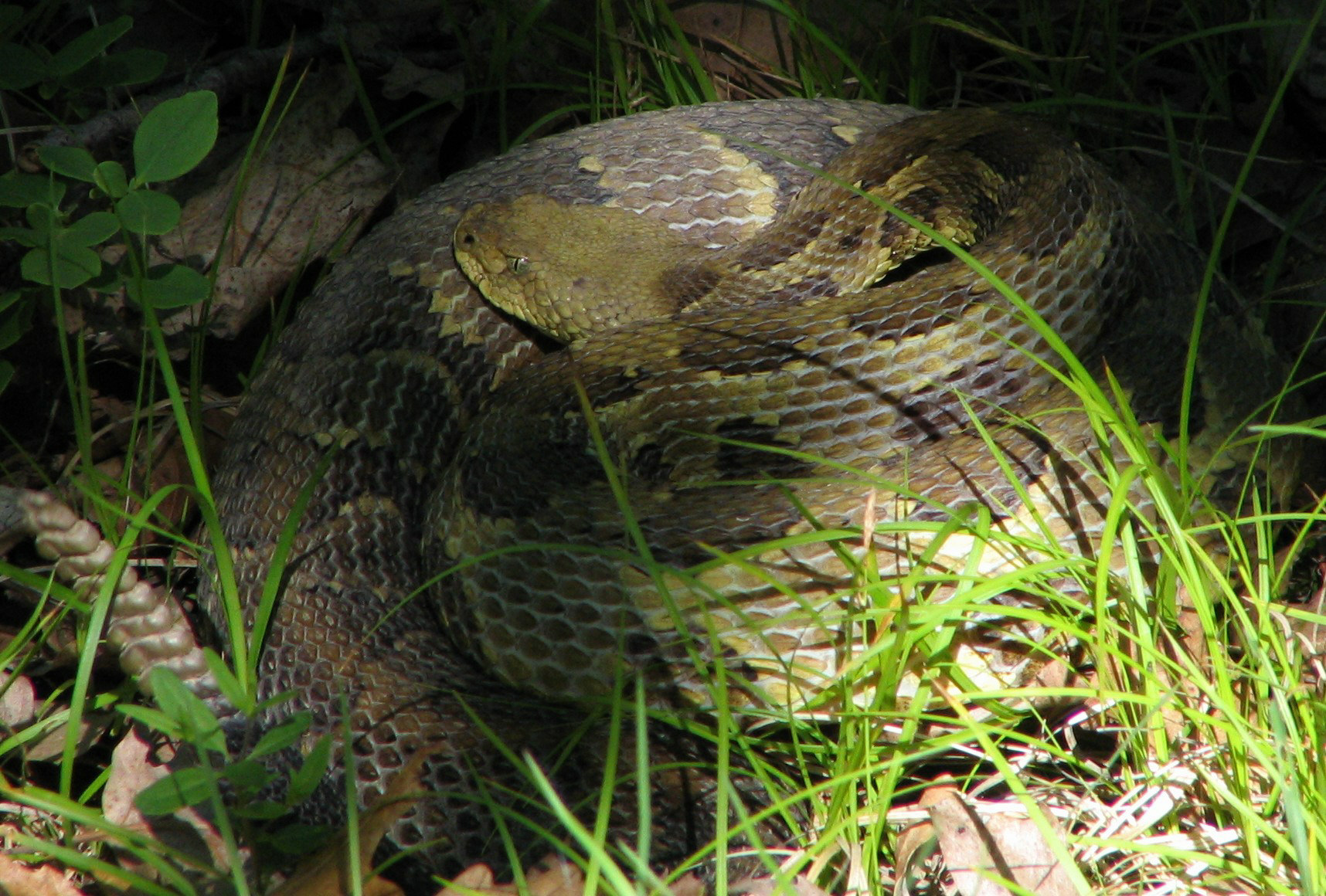
Timber rattlesnake near the Suffern-Bear Mountain Trail

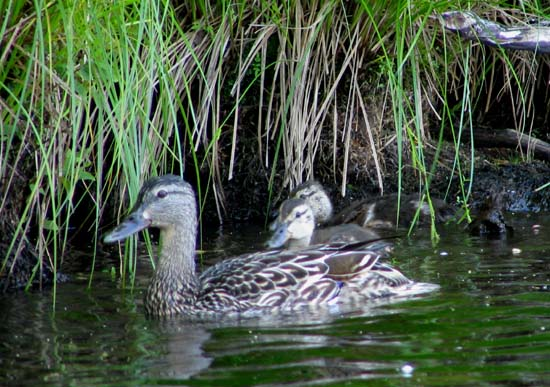
American black duck at Lake Sebago

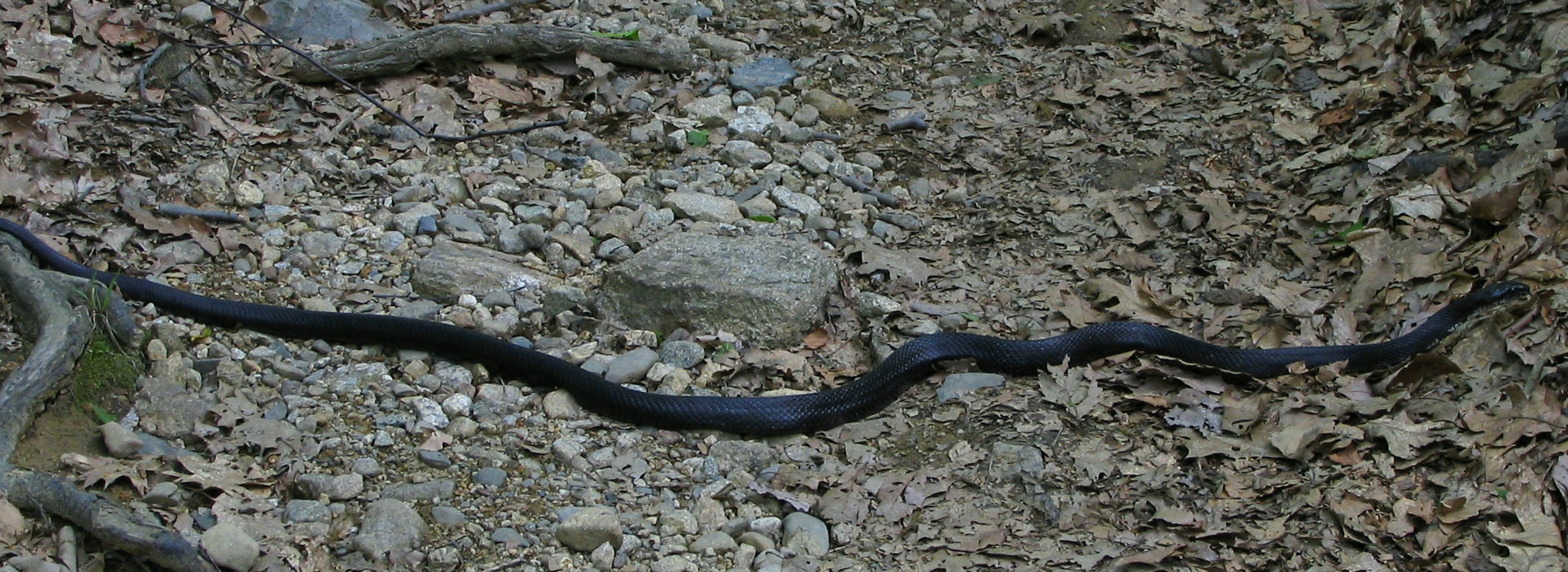
Eastern racer on the Pine Meadow Lake Trail

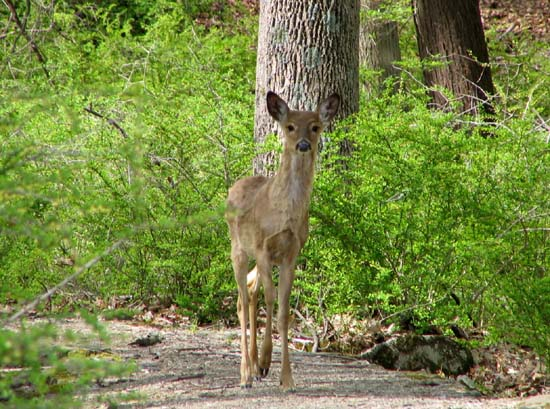
White-tailed deer at Lake Kanawauke

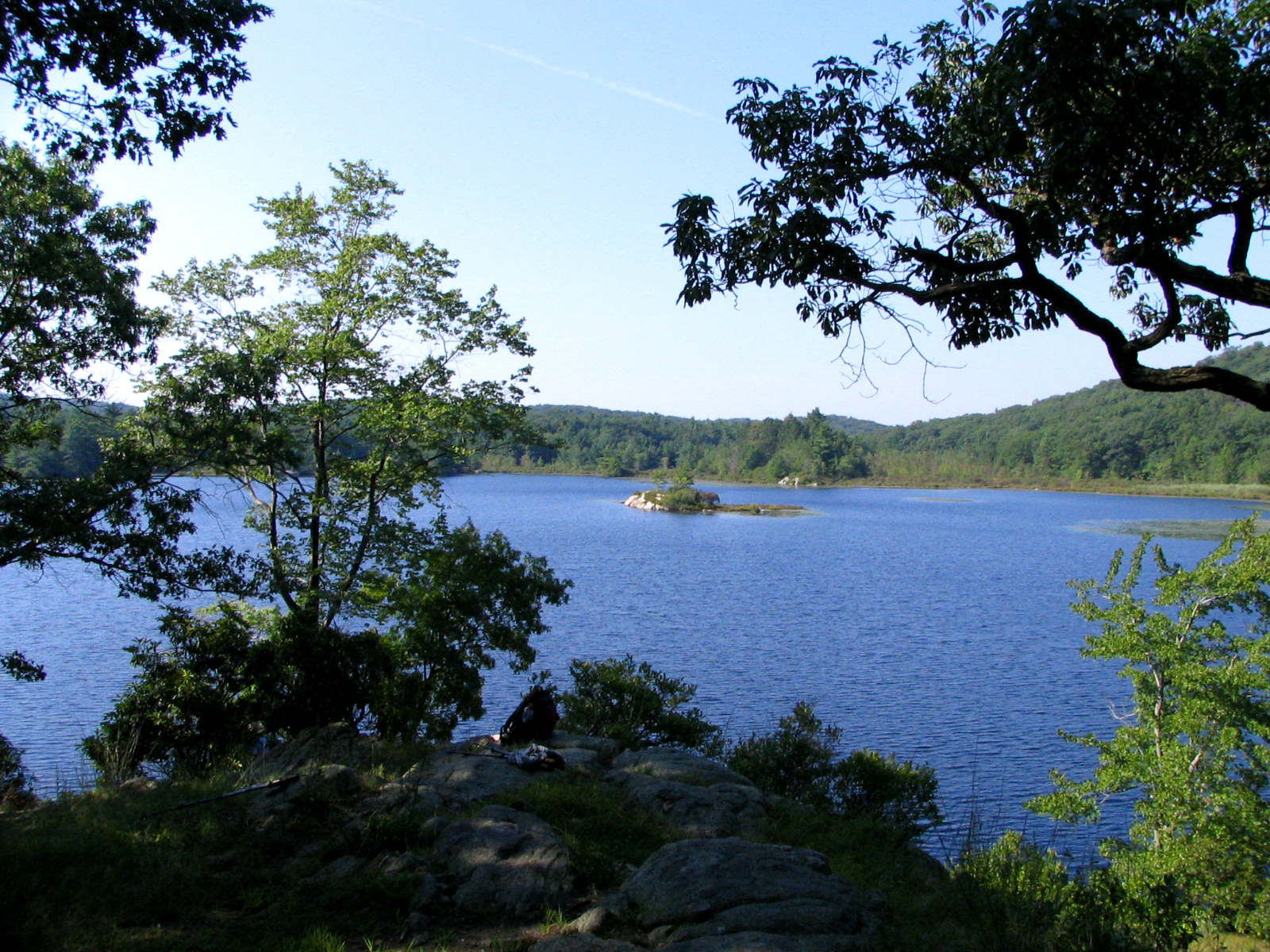
Island Pond, Harriman State Park

== Parkways and park roads ==
The following parkways exist within the park:

- Palisades Interstate Parkway
- Seven Lakes Drive
- Long Mountain Parkway
- Lake Welch Parkway
- Tiorati Brook Road
- Arden Valley Road
- Orange-Rockland CR 106

== See also ==
- Bear Mountain State Park
- List of New York state parks
