= List of Orthodox Jewish communities in the United States =

Areas and locations in the United States where Orthodox Jews live in significant communities. These are areas that have within them an Orthodox Jewish community in which there is a sizable and cohesive population, which has its own eruvs, community organizations, businesses, day schools, yeshivas, and/or synagogues that serve the members of the local Orthodox community who may at times be the majority of the population.

An appearance on this list does not mean that the place listed is inhabited entirely by Orthodox Jews, nor that Orthodox Jews constitute the majority of the population of the place listed. While some of the communities listed are nearly entirely Orthodox, most are cohesive Orthodox communities that exist within a larger, non-Orthodox community. In many cases, there are other cohesive communities within the same area comprising other religious and/or ethnic groups.

The majority of Orthodox Jews in the United States live in the Northeast U.S. (particularly New York and New Jersey), but many other communities in the United States have Orthodox Jewish populations. This list includes Haredi, Hasidic, Modern Orthodox, and Sephardic Orthodox communities. The list does not include every location in the United States that contains a Chabad house, as the main purpose of these synagogues is to reach out to non-Orthodox populations.

== Alabama ==
- Birmingham

== Arizona ==
- Casa Grande
- North Central Phoenix
- Scottsdale
- Tucson

== California ==
=== Southern California ===
- Beverly Hills
- Beverlywood, Los Angeles
- Bixby Knolls, Long Beach
- College Area, San Diego
- Encino, Los Angeles
- Fairfax District, Los Angeles
- Hancock Park, Los Angeles
- La Jolla, San Diego
- Northridge, Los Angeles
- Pico-Robertson, Los Angeles
- Tarzana, Los Angeles
- University Park, Irvine
- Valley Village, Los Angeles
- Westwood, Los Angeles
- Woodland Hills, Los Angeles

=== Northern California ===
- Arden-Arcade
- Berkeley
- Oakland
- Outer Richmond, San Francisco
- Palo Alto
- Sunset District, San Francisco

== Colorado ==
- Greenwood Village
- Hilltop, Denver
- Washington Virginia Vale, Denver
- West Colfax, Denver

== Connecticut ==
- Ellington
- New Haven
- New London
- Norwich
- Stamford
- Waterbury
- West Hartford

== District of Columbia ==
- Georgetown
- Shepherd Park

== Florida ==
- Aventura
- Boca Raton
- Boynton Beach
- Deerfield Beach
- Delray Beach
- Hollywood
- Miami Beach
- North Miami Beach
- Orlando
- Palm Beach
- South Jacksonville
- Tampa
- West Palm Beach

== Georgia ==
- Dunwoody
- Toco Hills, North Druid Hills
- Sandy Springs
- Savannah

== Illinois ==
- Lincolnwood
- Northbrook
- Skokie
- West Ridge/West Rogers Park, Chicago

== Indiana ==
- Centerville
- Indianapolis
- South Bend

== Iowa ==
- Postville

== Kansas ==
- Overland Park

== Kentucky ==
- Louisville

== Louisiana ==
- New Orleans

== Maryland ==
- Bethesda
- Cheswolde, Baltimore
- Fallstaff, Baltimore
- Glen, Baltimore
- Kemp Mill
- Olney
- Owings Mills
- Park Heights, Baltimore
- Pikesville
- Potomac
- Reisterstown
- Rockville
- Silver Spring
- White Oak

== Massachusetts ==
- Brighton
- Brookline
- Cambridge
- Longmeadow/Springfield
- Malden
- Newton
- Onset
- Sharon

== Michigan ==
- Ann Arbor
- Farmington Hills
- Huntington Woods
- Oak Park
- Southfield
- West Bloomfield

== Minnesota ==
- St. Louis Park
- Highland Park, St. Paul

== Missouri ==
- Chesterfield
- University City

== Nebraska ==
- Omaha

== Nevada ==
- Henderson
- Summerlin

== New Jersey ==
=== Central Jersey ===
- Aberdeen
- Allenhurst
- Bradley Beach
- Deal
- East Brunswick
- Eatontown
- Edison
- Elberon
- Highland Park
- Howell Township
- Jackson Township
- Lakewood Township
- Lawrenceville
- Loch Arbour
- Long Branch
- Marlboro
- Manalapan
- Monroe Township
- Oakhurst
- Red Bank
- Toms River
- Twin Rivers
- West Long Branch

=== North Jersey ===
- Bergenfield
- Clifton
- Elizabeth
- Englewood
- Fair Lawn
- Fort Lee
- Greenville, Jersey City
- Hillside
- Linden
- Livingston
- Mahwah
- Maplewood
- Morristown
- Mount Freedom, Randolph
- New Milford
- Paramus
- Parsippany
- Passaic
- Springfield
- Teaneck
- Tenafly
- Union City
- West Orange

=== South Jersey ===
- Cherry Hill
- Margate City

== New York ==
With the largest Jewish population outside Israel, approximately one-third of all Jews in New York are now Orthodox Jews.

=== Bronx ===
- Baychester
- Pelham Parkway
- Riverdale

=== Brooklyn ===
- Bensonhurst
- Borough Park
- Brownsville
- Crown Heights
- Flatbush
- Gravesend
- Kensington
- Manhattan Beach
- Marine Park
- Midwood
- Mill Basin
- Sheepshead Bay
- Williamsburg

=== Manhattan ===
- Lower East Side
- Upper East Side
- Upper West Side
- Washington Heights

=== Queens ===
- Bayswater
- Belle Harbor
- Far Rockaway
- Forest Hills
- Fresh Meadows
- Hillcrest
- Hollis Hills, Queens Village
- Holliswood
- Jamaica Estates
- Kew Gardens
- Kew Gardens Hills
- Rego Park
- Richmond Hill
- Rosedale
- Sunnyside

=== Staten Island ===
- Manor Heights
- Westerleigh
- Willowbrook

=== Long Island ===
- Atlantic Beach
- Cedarhurst
- Coram
- East Meadow
- East Northport
- Great Neck
- Hewlett
- Huntington
- Inwood
- Lawrence
- Lido Beach
- Long Beach
- Lynbrook
- Merrick
- New Hyde Park
- North Bellmore
- North Woodmere
- Oceanside
- Patchogue
- Plainview
- Rockville Centre
- Valley Stream
- Westhampton Beach, Southampton
- West Hempstead/Franklin Square
- Woodmere
- Woodsburgh

=== Orange County ===
- Blooming Grove
- Chester
- Monroe
- Palm Tree
  - Kiryas Joel
- Woodbury
  - Harriman

=== Rockland County ===
- Ramapo
  - Airmont
  - Kaser
  - Montebello
  - Monsey
  - New Hempstead
  - New Square
  - Spring Valley
  - Wesley Hills

=== Sullivan County ===
- Bloomingburg
- Fallsburg
  - Loch Sheldrake
  - South Fallsburg
  - Woodridge
  - Woodbourne
- Kiamesha Lake
- Thompson
  - Monticello
- Swan Lake
- White Lake

=== Upstate ===
- Albany
- Buffalo
- Poughkeepsie
- Rochester
- Schenectady
- Syracuse
- Wawarsing
  - Ellenville
- Williamsville

=== Westchester County ===
- Fleetwood, Mount Vernon
- Harrison
- Mount Kisco
- New Rochelle
- Scarsdale
- White Plains
- Yonkers

== Ohio ==
- Amberley
- Beachwood
- Bexley
- Berwick, Columbus
- Cleveland Heights
- Golf Manor
- University Heights

== Oregon ==
- Hillsdale, Portland

== Pennsylvania ==
- Allentown
- Center City, Philadelphia
- Elkins Park
- Kingston
- Lancaster
- Lower Merion Township
  - Bala Cynwyd
  - Merion Station
  - Penn Wynne
  - Wynnewood
- Newtown
- Northeast Philadelphia
  - Bustleton
  - Rhawnhurst
  - Somerton
- Scranton
- South Philadelphia
- Squirrel Hill, Pittsburgh
- Uptown, Harrisburg
- Yardley

== Rhode Island ==
- Newport
- Providence

== South Carolina ==
- Charleston
- Myrtle Beach

== Tennessee ==
- East Memphis
- Southwestern Nashville

== Texas ==
- Brays Oaks/Meyerland, Houston
- North/Far North Dallas
- Northwest Austin
- Northwest San Antonio

== Virginia ==
- Fairfax
- Norfolk
- Richmond
- Virginia Beach

== Washington ==
- Mercer Island
- Ravenna, Seattle
- Seward Park, Seattle

== Wisconsin ==
- Bayside
- Glendale
- Lake Park, Milwaukee
- Mequon
- Sherman Park, Milwaukee
- Shorewood
- Whitefish Bay
