= Viola, New York =

- Census-designated place
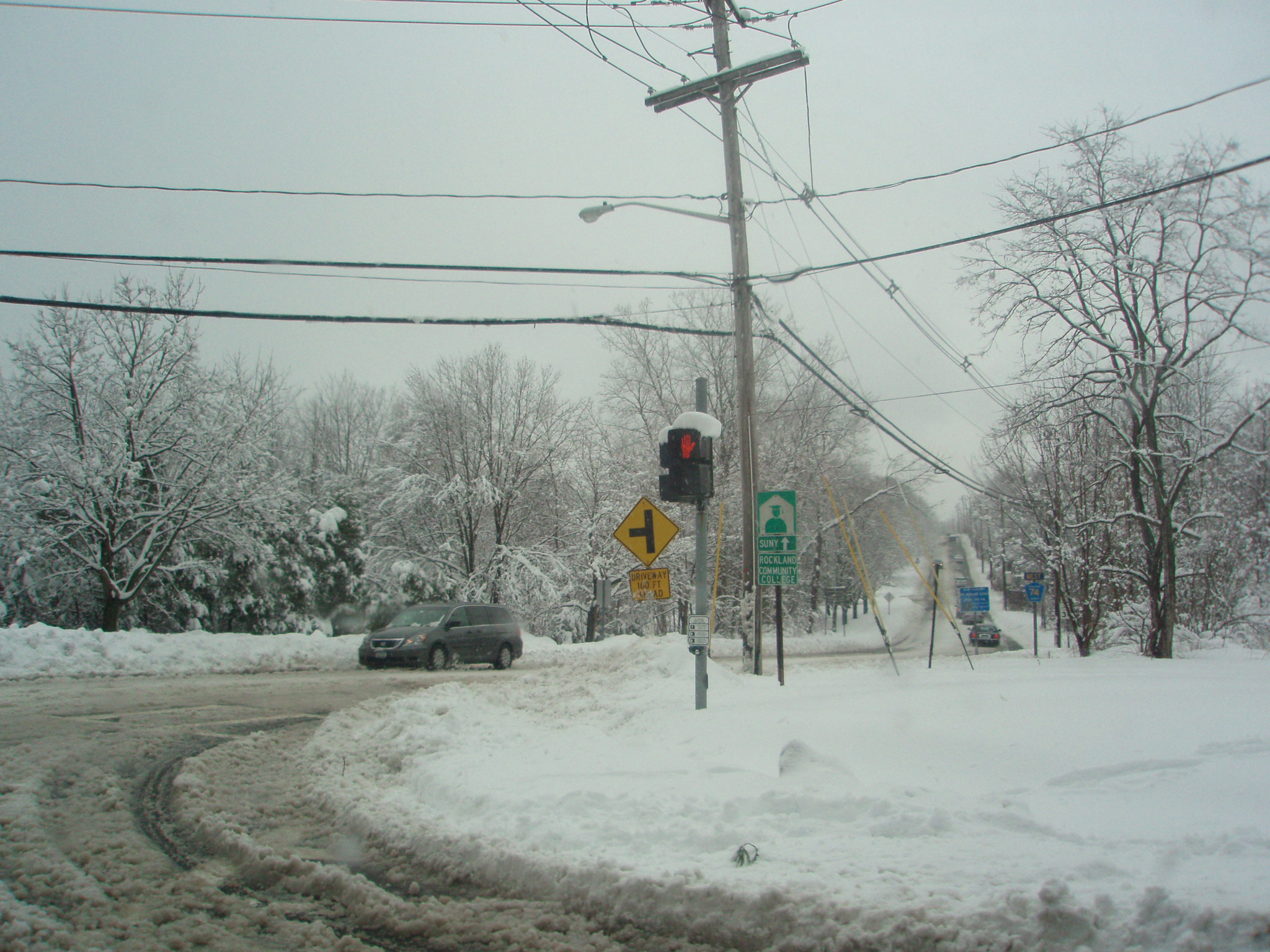
- Winter In Viola

- Location in Rockland County and the state of New York.

- Location within the state of New York
- Coordinates: 41°7′35″N 74°5′0″W
- Country: United States
- State: New York
- County: Rockland
- Town: Ramapo

Area
  - Total: 2.76 sq mi (7.16 km^{2})
  - Land: 2.76 sq mi (7.16 km^{2})
  - Water: 0 sq mi (0.00 km^{2})
- Elevation: 568 ft (173 m)

Population (2020)
  - Total: 8,208
  - Density: 2,969.4/sq mi (1,146.48/km^{2})
- Time zone: UTC-5 (Eastern (EST))
  - Summer (DST): UTC-4 (EDT)
- FIPS code: 36-77574
- GNIS feature ID: 0968565

Viola (/vaɪˈoʊlə/) is a hamlet and census-designated place in the town of Ramapo, Rockland County, New York, United States. It is located north of Airmont, east of Montebello, south of Wesley Hills, and west of Hillcrest. As of the 2020 census, Viola had a population of 8,208.

== History ==
=== Alms House ===
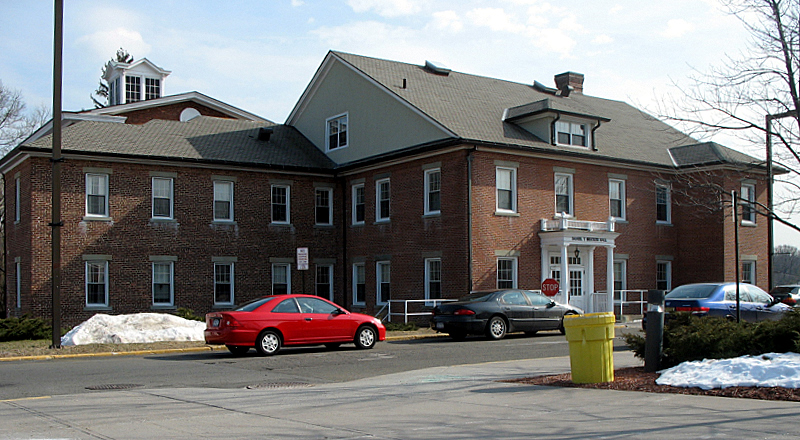
Daniel T. Brucker Hall, Rockland Community College

The Alms House (or County Poor House) was established in 1837, at Viola (then known as Mechanicsville) in the town of Ramapo, for the poor and destitute (debtors). It was located 7 miles (11 km) west of New City. Rockland County had purchased the 47-acre (190,000 m^{2}) parsonage farm of the Kakiat (West New Hempstead) Dutch Reformed Church (also known as the Brick Church) for use as an alms house. There the county originally built a wooden frame house to serve the poor. The inmates contributed to their upkeep by tending the farm. In 1883, a brick building was constructed. The facility included a school for the children. In 1957, the Alms House was moved to Building "C" at the Pomona Health Center in Summit Park, and the property would become the site of Rockland Community College. The Alms House was renamed the Rockland County Infirmary and Home. In 1977, it was removed to Building "A". It has been renamed the Summit Park Nursing Care Center. The old brick Alms House building remains as an administration building (Daniel T. Brucker Hall), used by Rockland Community College. The farm lands are the campus. The Poor Cemetery (Potter's Field) remains on the RCC campus, along with the original Gary Onderdonk Veterans' Cemetery.

== Geography ==
Viola is located at 41°7′35″N 74°5′0″W (41.126295, -74.083285).

According to the United States Census Bureau, the CDP has a total area of 2.7 square miles (7.0 km^{2}), all land.

== Demographics ==
Historical population
Census	Pop.	Note	%±
2020	8,208		—
U.S. Decennial Census

As of the census of 2000, there were 5,931 people, 1,681 households, and 1,250 families residing in the CDP. The population density was 2,192.4 inhabitants per square mile (846.5/km^{2}). There were 1,738 housing units at an average density of 642.4 per square mile (248.0/km^{2}). The racial makeup of the CDP was 97.81% White, 0.32% African American, 0.05% Native American, 0.67% Asian, 0.07% Pacific Islander, 0.46% from other races, and 0.62% from two or more races. Hispanic or Latino of any race were 2.61% of the population.

There were 1,681 households, out of which 40.7% had children under the age of 18 living with them, 68.7% were married couples living together, 4.1% had a female householder with no husband present, and 25.6% were non-families. 24.4% of all households were made up of individuals, and 20.6% had someone living alone who was 65 years of age or older. The average household size was 3.53 and the average family size was 4.34.

In the CDP, the population was spread out, with 39.9% under the age of 18, 8.3% from 18 to 24, 17.6% from 25 to 44, 18.9% from 45 to 64, and 15.3% who were 65 years of age or older. The median age was 28 years. For every 100 females, there were 92.4 males. For every 100 females age 18 and over, there were 87.2 males.

The median income for a household in the CDP was $59,821, and the median income for a family was $87,273. Males had a median income of $68,533 versus $39,375 for females. The per capita income for the CDP was $27,289. About 4.9% of families and 6.5% of the population were below the poverty line, including 6.3% of those under age 18 and 9.6% of those age 65 or over.

== Education ==
East Ramapo Central School District and Suffern Central School District (formerly Ramapo Central) serve portions of Viola.
