= Hillcrest, Rockland County, New York =

Hillcrest, New York
- Census-designated place
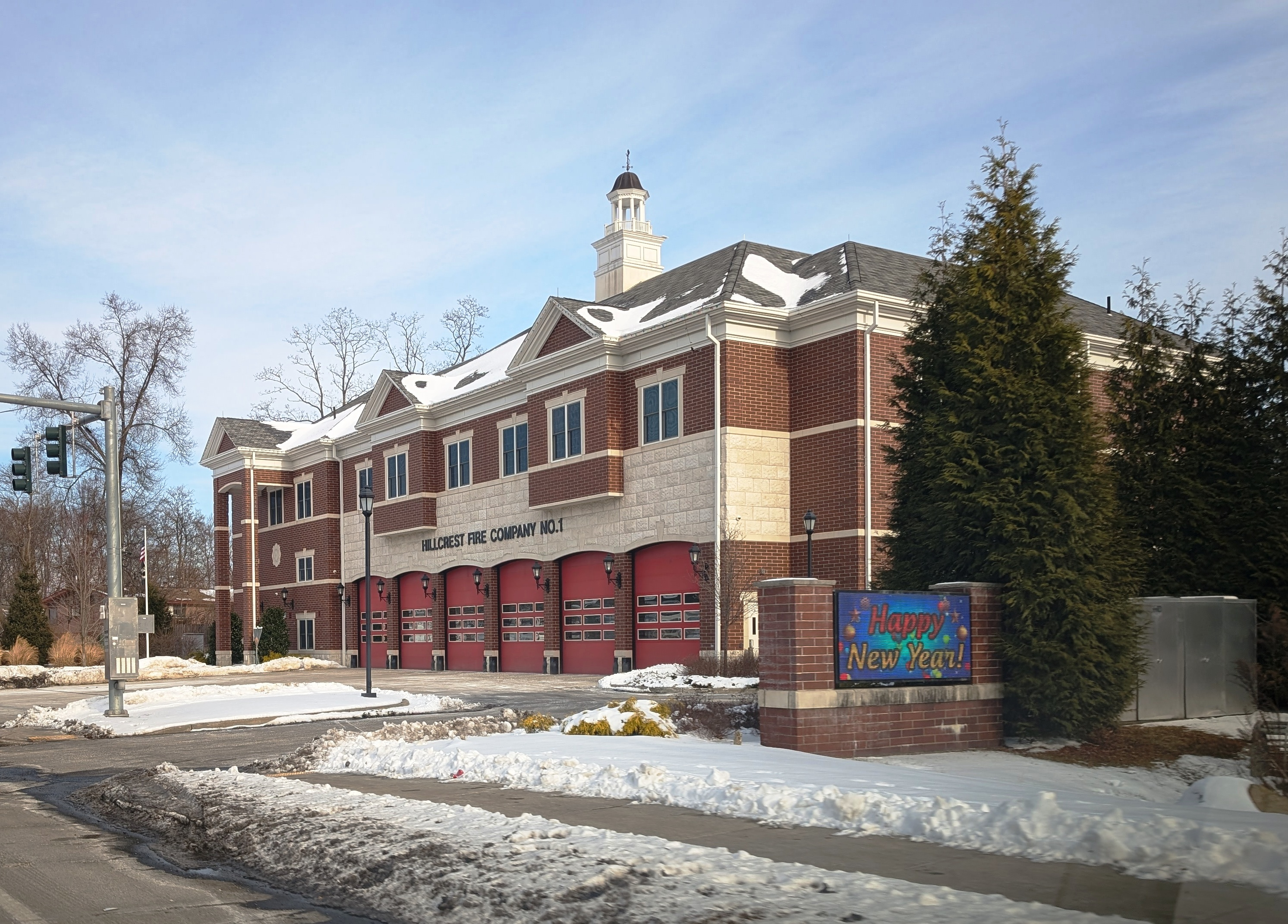
- Hillcrest Fire Company No. 1 station

- Location in Rockland County and the state of New York.

- Location within the state of New York
- Coordinates: 41°7′47″N 74°2′8″W
- Country: United States
- State: New York
- County: Rockland
- Town: Ramapo

Area
  - Total: 1.31 sq mi (3.38 km^{2})
  - Land: 1.31 sq mi (3.38 km^{2})
  - Water: 0 sq mi (0.00 km^{2})
- Elevation: 512 ft (156 m)

Population (2020)
  - Total: 8,164
  - Density: 6,256.0/sq mi (2,415.46/km^{2})
- Time zone: UTC-5 (Eastern (EST))
  - Summer (DST): UTC-4 (EDT)
- FIPS code: 36-34693
- GNIS feature ID: 0952813

Hillcrest is a hamlet incorporated in 1893 and census-designated place, in the town of Ramapo, Rockland County, New York, United States. It is located north of Spring Valley, east of Viola, south of New Square and New Hempstead, and west of New City. The population was 8,164 at the 2020 census.

It is a bedroom suburb of New York City, as many residents commute to employment in Manhattan (and, to a lesser extent, northern New Jersey) by bus (Red and Tan Lines), train (Metro-North Railroad) or automobile. It is primarily served by the Spring Valley post office.

== History ==
In the early 1900s, Hillcrest became a summer retreat for working-class families from New York City; the families could access Hillcrest by train from New Jersey (after ferrying across to the western shore of the Hudson). In 1955, the Tappan Zee Bridge opened (connecting Tarrytown in Westchester County with Nyack in Rockland County), increasing traffic into the community and making access to New York City easier for the local population. Along with many other communities in the lower Hudson Valley, Hillcrest became a destination for White Flight from New York City in the 1950s through 1970s. Craig H. Long, the Town of Ramapo historian, said that many secular Jews were part of the first wave of settlers into Hillcrest after the opening of the Tappan Zee. In the 1960s, Hillcrest attracted Jews from the boroughs of Brooklyn and The Bronx in New York City; the Jewish people going to Hillcrest desired inexpensive starter homes, a short commute and a suburban atmosphere.

In the 1990s, the community attracted immigrants from Asia and the Caribbean, as well as new residents from Brooklyn and The Bronx; the newcomers moved to the community for the same reasons as the Jews did in previous decades. In the 1990s, the community lost a greater percentage of white people than any other place in New York. From 1980 to 2001, the community's demographics changed from almost completely white to around one-fifth white. According to the 2000 Census, Hillcrest is a majority African-American community. David W. Chen of The New York Times said that "perhaps one of the reasons Hillcrest has managed to evolve so significantly yet anonymously" is the community's hamlet status; he added that "even within Ramapo, Hillcrest is often overlooked." Chen reported that many real estate agents and residents said that no one factor caused or contributed to the ethnic change. Many families moved because their children became adults and they wanted lower property tax rates or because they retired and moved to warmer climates. The significant exodus of Jews from Hillcrest in the 1990s resulted in the closure of many local businesses that had operated for more than thirty years, including kosher butcher shops, kosher delis and bakeries in Hillcrest and nearby communities such as Spring Valley and New City.

== Geography ==
Hillcrest is located at 41°7′47″N 74°2′8″W (41.129645, -74.035527).

According to the United States Census Bureau, the CDP has a total area of 1.3 square miles (3.4 km^{2}), all land.

Hillcrest is located on the eastern edge of the town of Ramapo, approximately midway between the town of Haverstraw to the north and the New Jersey border (Bergen County) to the south. Hillcrest is bordered on the north by the villages of New Hempstead and New Square, on the south by the village of Spring Valley and by an unincorporated area of the town of Ramapo, on the east by an unincorporated area of the town of Clarkstown, and on the west by the villages of New Hempstead and Viola.

== Demographics ==
Historical population
Census	Pop.	Note	%±
2000	7,106		—
2010	7,558		6.4%
2020	8,164		8.0%
U.S. Decennial Census; 2010 2020

=== Racial and ethnic composition ===
Hillcrest CDP, New York – Racial and ethnic composition Note: the US Census treats Hispanic/Latino as an ethnic category. This table excludes Latinos from the racial categories and assigns them to a separate category. Hispanics/Latinos may be of any race.
Race / Ethnicity (NH = Non-Hispanic)	Pop 2000	Pop 2010	Pop 2020	% 2000	% 2010	% 2020
White alone (NH)	1,520	943	881	21.39%	12.48%	10.79%
Black or African American alone (NH)	3,482	4,065	3,070	49.00%	53.78%	37.60%
Native American or Alaska Native alone (NH)	9	14	47	0.13%	0.19%	0.58%
Asian alone (NH)	1,039	817	599	14.62%	10.81%	7.34%
Native Hawaiian or Pacific Islander alone (NH)	1	4	0	0.01%	0.05%	0.00%
Other race alone (NH)	30	50	75	0.42%	0.66%	0.92%
Mixed race or Multiracial (NH)	209	154	131	2.94%	2.04%	1.60%
Hispanic or Latino (any race)	816	1,511	3,361	11.48%	19.99%	41.17%
Total	7,106	7,558	8,164	100.00%	100.00%	100.00%

=== 2000 Census ===
As of the census of 2000, there were 7,106 people, 1,979 households, and 1,593 families residing in the CDP. The population density was 5,505.8 inhabitants per square mile (2,125.8/km^{2}). There were 2,036 housing units at an average density of 1,577.5 per square mile (609.1/km^{2}). This population density is reflected in the Town of Ramapo's land use plan, which designates most of Hillcrest as medium-high density residential (3 to 10 dwelling units per acre), with a very small portion, located at the intersection of New York Route 45 and Eckerson Road (County Route 74), designated as neighborhood businesses.

The racial makeup of the CDP was 25.58% White, 51.11% African American, 0.32% Native American, 14.69% Asian, 0.07% Pacific Islander, 4.02% from other races, and 4.19% from two or more races. Hispanic or Latino of any race were 11.48% of the population.

There were 1,979 households, out of which 42.3% had children under the age of 18 living with them, 63.1% were married couples living together, 12.4% had a female householder with no husband present, and 19.5% were non-families. 16.5% of all households were made up of individuals, and 8.7% had someone living alone who was 65 years of age or older. The average household size was 3.49 and the average family size was 3.89.

In the CDP, the population was spread out, with 26.7% under the age of 18, 9.3% from 18 to 24, 26.5% from 25 to 44, 24.8% from 45 to 64, and 12.6% who were 65 years of age or older. The median age was 38 years. For every 100 females, there were 95.9 males. For every 100 females age 18 and over, there were 91.1 males.

The median income for a household in the CDP was $68,889, and the median income for a family was $76,960. Males had a median income of $38,451 versus $35,408 for females. The per capita income for the CDP was $21,993. About 7.6% of families and 8.1% of the population were below the poverty line, including 10.1% of those under age 18 and 15.8% of those age 65 or over.

== Education ==
The community is within the East Ramapo Central School District.
