= New Hempstead Presbyterian Church =

Historic church in New York, United States

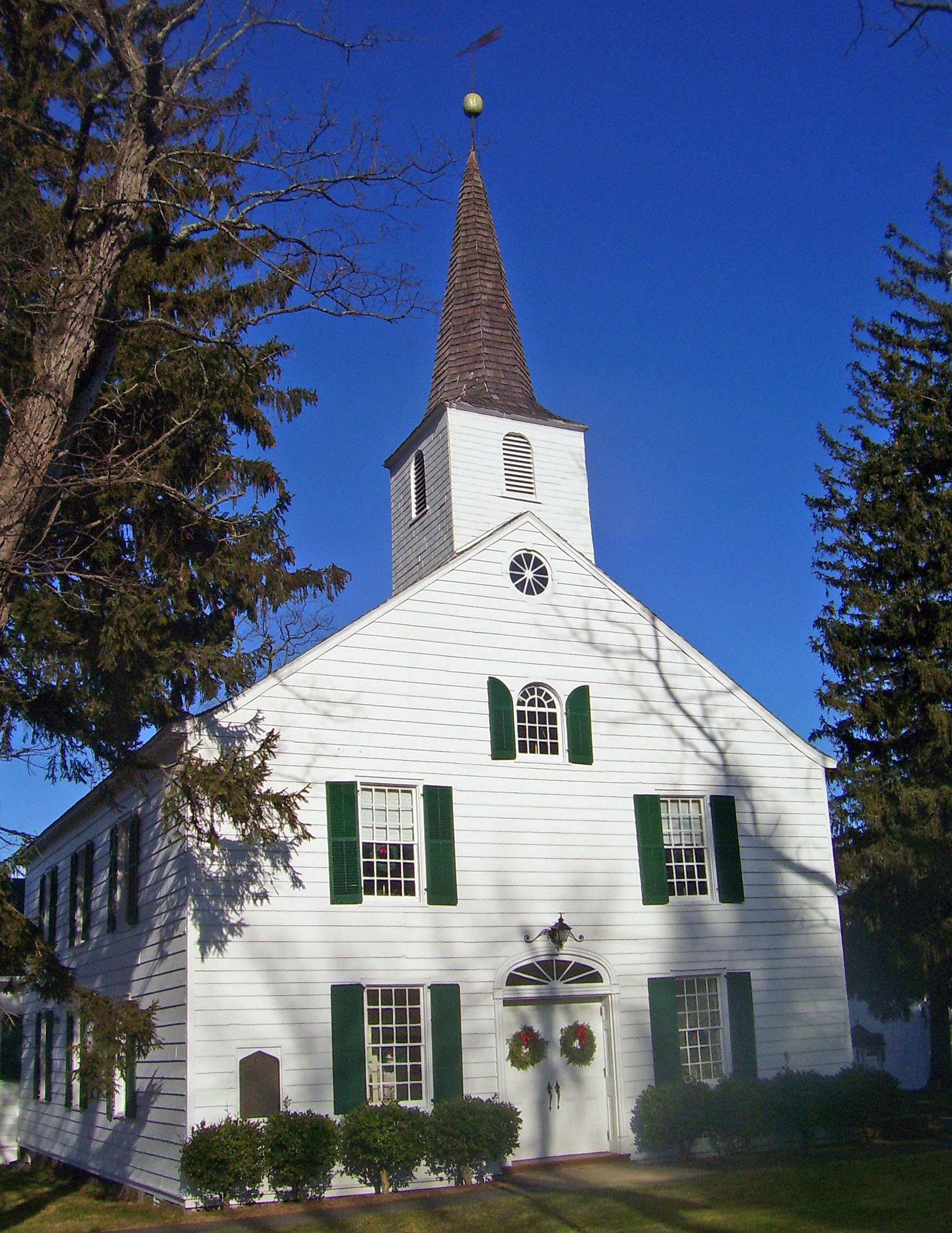
- West profile and south elevation, 2008

Religion
- Affiliation: Presbyterian
- Leadership: The Rev. Angela Maddalone
- Status: Active

Location
- Location: New Hempstead, NY, USA
- Interactive map of New Hempstead Presbyterian Church
- Coordinates: 41°8′59″N 74°1′56″W

Architecture
- Style: Federal
- Completed: 1827

Specifications
- Direction of façade: South
- Spire: 1
- Materials: Wood, asphalt

U.S. National Register of Historic Places
- Added to NRHP: November 23, 1977
- NRHP Reference no.: 77000980

Website
- New Hempstead Presbyterian Church

The New Hempstead Presbyterian Church is located at the intersection of New Hempstead (Rockland County Route 80) and Old Schoolhouse roads in New Hemsptead, New York, United States. It is a wood frame Federal style building from the 1820s, the third church on the site.

When its congregation was established in 1734, it was the first by a group of English settlers in New York west of the Hudson River. The building is the second oldest extant church in the county. In 1863 a school was built on nearby property and used by the local school district; it later became the oldest continuously used public school building in the county. In 1977 the church and school, along with some other outbuildings, were listed on the National Register of Historic Places as the English Church and Schoolhouse.

== Buildings and grounds ==
The church and its outbuildings are on a 7-acre (2.8 ha) lot at the northeast corner of the slightly oblique intersection, just east of New York State Route 45, a half-mile (1 km) west of Palisades Interstate Parkway and just south of New Hempstead Village Hall. There is another large institutional building on the west side of Route 45, and some residences along the south side of New Hempstead Road. The generally flat terrain is wooded, buffering the church and the other institutional buildings in the area from backyards in a nearby residential subdivision to the northeast.

Located at the southwest corner of the property, closest to both roads, the church itself is a two-story three-by-three-bay structure sided in clapboard with a gabled roof. There is a one-story addition on the rear (north) end. At the south (front) end, a shingled spire with belfry topped by a weathervane rises.

The 12-over-12 double-hung sash windows on the front facade are flanked by louvered wooden shutters. In the center of the attic is a smaller round-arched window with matching shutters. Above it is a small oculus with radial muntins at the gable apex. The two side elevations are fully fenestrated with windows similar to those on the front. A fanlight below an iron lamp surmounts the recessed double doors at the centrally located main entrance.

To the east of the church is a two-story wood frame manse. The old schoolhouse is a one-room frame building to the northeast. Its interior is decorated in embossed tin with neoclassical patterns. Behind them, to the north, are some more modern buildings and parking lots.

== History ==
The lower western Hudson Valley had been settled by the Dutch in the late 17th century. English settlers began coming to the area after the purchase of the Kakiat Patent in what is now Rockland County in 1696. The New Hempstead area was purchased by a group of men from the Long Island town of Hempstead in 1713 and gradually settled by migrants from that area.

By 1734, farms had been established, roads including the two that intersect at the church had been laid out, and there were enough settlers to establish the congregation. It is the second oldest in the county after the Reformed Church of Tappan. A meeting house was built at the crossroads; over the next century the congregation grew enough that it would need to be replaced. During the Revolutionary War the church was an important meeting place for political and military activities since Patriot forces including units of the Continental Army used the road for movements in order to avoid the eyes of British ships along the Hudson River to the east.

The current church was built in 1827. It is the oldest extant Federal style church in the county. The schoolhouse was built in 1867 and expanded to two rooms in 1891. At that point its interior decoration was added.

In 1905 the church, having sold off some of its original land including the farmhouse that had served as its parsonage, built the manse. It bought back another acre (4,000 m^{2}) to build a playground for the school. Later it was transferred to the East Ramapo Central School District and leased back from them.

Plumbing and heating was eventually added to the school. The one-story annex was built on the rear of the church in 1960. Murchison Hall, a modern church hall, was built north of the older buildings the next year. Twelve years later, in 1973, fire damaged the roof and north wall of the church. They were restored to their original appearance. There have been no significant changes to the buildings since then.

== Programs ==
The church holds services every Sunday, with a fellowship hour afterwards. Sunday school is held at Murchison Hall. It is complemented by an adult Bible study group and one devoted to contemporary issues. A youth group meets on Sunday afternoons.

On the last Saturday of every month, the church holds a fellowship breakfast at a restaurant in nearby New City. The choir rehearses every Thursday. Other outside groups the church it supports include Alcoholics Anonymous and Habitat for Humanity. It publishes a monthly newsletter, The Carriage Stone.

== See also ==
- National Register of Historic Places listings in Rockland County, New York
