= Central United Talmudical Academy of Monsey =

Hasidic Jewish school in Airmont, New York

Coordinates: 41.13304°N 74.04053°W

Central United Talmudical Academy of Monsey or Central UTA of Monsey (CUTAM) is a private Hasidic Jewish school, with separate boys' and girls' campuses, in Airmont, New York.

== History ==
In 2017, the school had about 800 students. There were expansion plans to have a new 22-acre (8.9 ha) campus with a capacity about 2,000 students in 44 classrooms, with half of each student count being boys and girls, and with each gender's school building having 73,000 square feet (6,800 m^{2}) of space. CUTA purchased the ex-Camp Regesh site in August 2016 to be its new campus. By 2017 the boys' school remained in an off-site leased building while it had moved the girls' school to the new site. A group of residents in Airmont opposed the plans.

In November 2018 the school filed a federal lawsuit against the Village of Airmont, accusing it of wrongfully using building code and zoning rules against the school and against the Suffern Central School District for denying transportation to the school's disabled students. In 2020 Vincent Briccetti, a U.S. district court judge, ruled that the trial may proceed as he found enough evidence for such.
