= Torne Brook Farm =

Historic house in New York, United States

- U.S. National Register of Historic Places
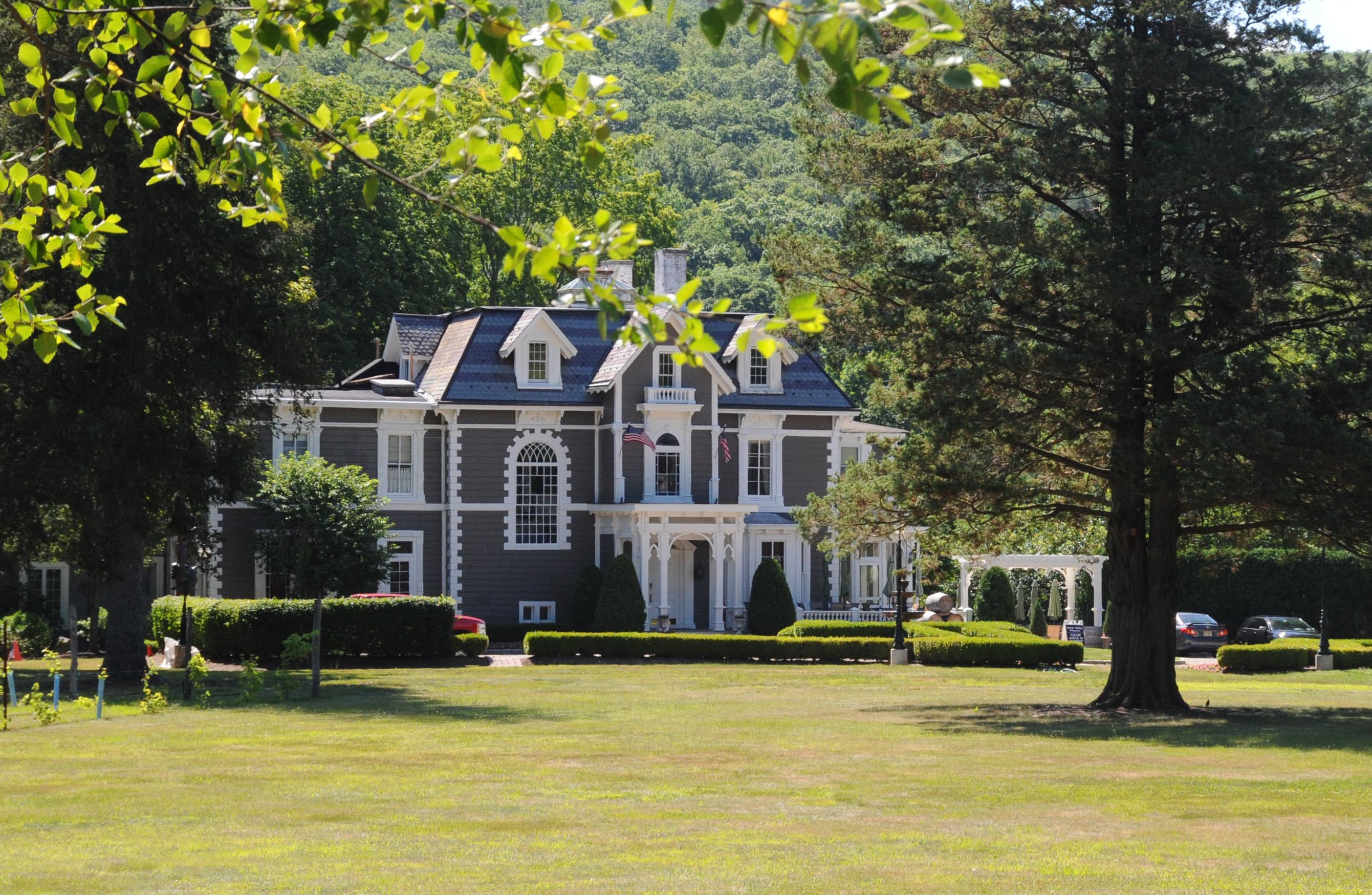

- Location within New York Location within the United States
- Location: Torne Brook Rd., Ramapo, New York
- Coordinates: 41°8′25″N 74°9′48″W
- Area: 13 acres (5.3 ha)
- Built: 1908
- Architectural style: Gothic, High Victorian Gothic
- NRHP reference No.: 88000611
- Added to NRHP: May 19, 1988

Torne Brook Farm is a historic home and farm complex of 15 acres, located at Ramapo near Torne Mountain (bordered by Torne Brook and the Ramapo River) in Rockland County, New York. It was built by Charles T. Pierson.

The complex consists of the mansion built in1875 in the High Victorian Gothic style, eight contributing and related outbuildings, and one contributing structure. The main block of the mansion is a 2-story wood-frame dwelling on a cut-stone foundation. It features a mansard roof. Also on the property are a large 1 1/2-story frame barn, frame carriage house, caretaker's cottage, chicken coops, and a kennel.

It was listed on the National Register of Historic Places in 1988, though it was in a state of disrepair. Brothers Jon and Stephen France purchased the estate, and started to restore the mansion, the surrounding structures, and the landscaping. They also planted vines and established the first vineyard ever in Rockland County, the Torne Valley Vineyard, and opened up the estate's gates to the public in 2011.
