= Wesley Hills, New York =

- Village
- Location in Rockland County and the state of New York.

- Location within the state of New York
- Coordinates: 41°9′21″N 74°4′31″W
- Country: United States
- State: New York
- County: Rockland
- Town: Ramapo
- Incorporated: December 7, 1982

Government
  - Mayor: Marshall Katz
  - Deputy Mayor: Milton Schwartz
  - Trustees: Yisroel Cherns, Yossi Mause and Tova Krull

Area
  - Total: 3.37 sq mi (8.74 km^{2})
  - Land: 3.35 sq mi (8.68 km^{2})
  - Water: 0.023 sq mi (0.06 km^{2})
- Elevation: 538 ft (164 m)

Population (2020)
  - Total: 6,116
  - Estimate (2025): 6,477 ▲
  - Density: 1,933/sq mi (746/km^{2})
- Time zone: UTC-5 (Eastern (EST))
  - Summer (DST): UTC-4 (EDT)
- ZIP codes: 10901, 10952, 10977
- Area code: 845
- FIPS code: 36-79174
- GNIS feature ID: 0979941
- Website: https://www.wesleyhills.gov/

Wesley Hills is a village in the town of Ramapo, Rockland County, New York, United States. It is located north of Viola, east of Harriman State Park, south of Pomona, and west of New Hempstead. As of the 2020 census, Wesley Hills had a population of 6,116.

Joseph Berger of The New York Times said in a 1997 article that Wesley Hills was one of several Ramapo villages formed by non-Jews and secular Jews "to preserve the sparse Better Homes and Garden [sic] ambiance that attracted them to Rockland County."

Mayor Marshall Katz was appointed by the village board after Mayor David Goldsmith resigned in August 2014 citing "increased responsibilities at my day job and some health issues." After finishing the remainder of the term, Mayor Katz ran unopposed in March 2015.

== Geography ==
Wesley Hills is located at 41°9′21″N 74°4′31″W (41.155795, -74.075257).

According to the United States Census Bureau, the village has a total area of 3.4 square miles (8.8 km^{2}), of which 3.4 square miles (8.8 km^{2}) is land and 0.30% is water.

== Demographics ==
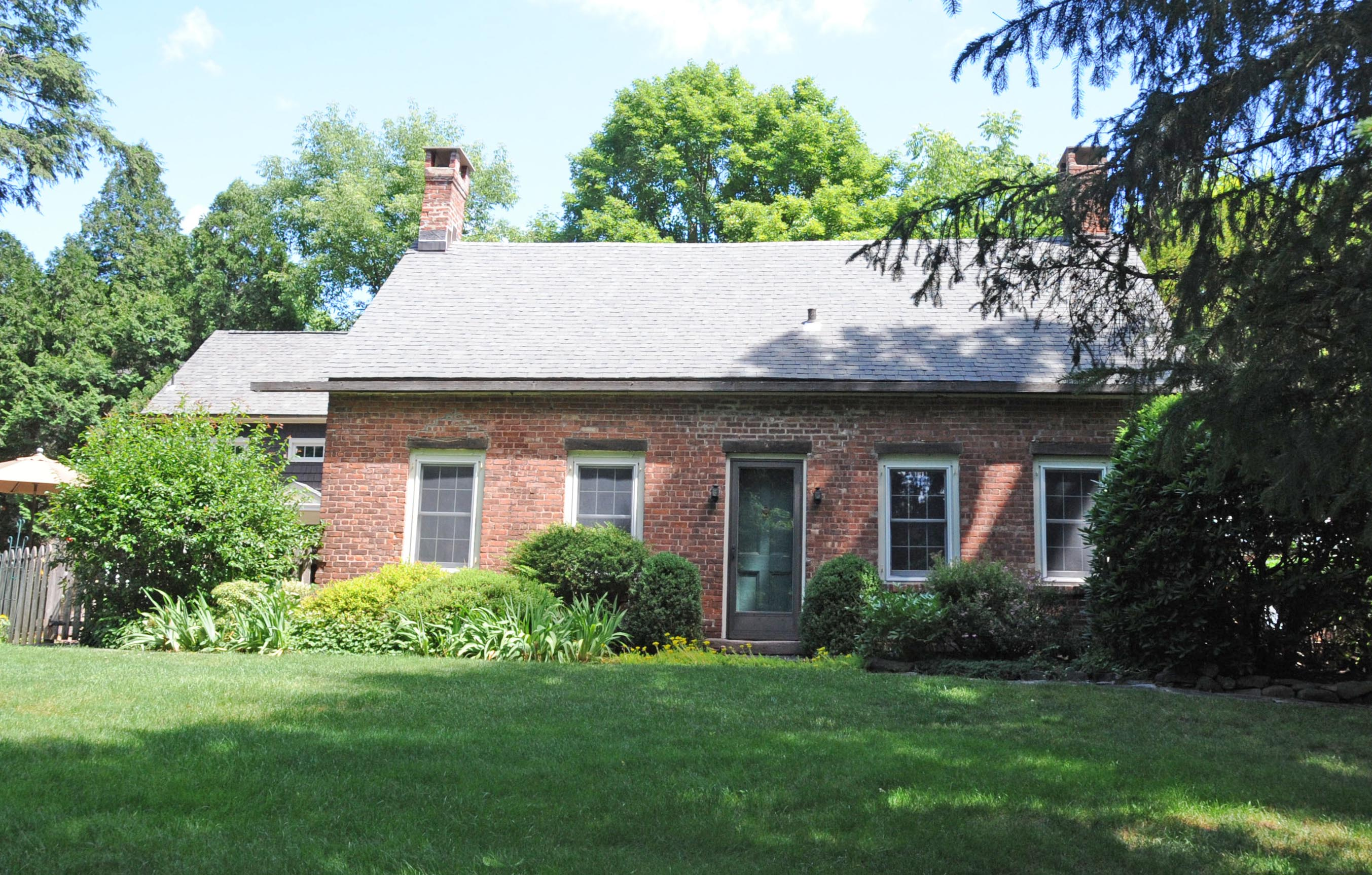
Gurneey Sherwood House

Historical population
Census	Pop.	Note	%±
1990	4,305		—
2000	4,848		12.6%
2010	5,628		16.1%
2020	6,116		8.7%
2025 (est.)	6,477		5.9%
U.S. Decennial Census

As of the census of 2000, there were 4,848 people, 1,430 households, and 1,272 families residing in the village. The population density was 1,444.3 inhabitants per square mile (557.6/km^{2}). There were 1,474 housing units at an average density of 439.1 per square mile (169.5/km^{2}). The racial makeup of the village was 88.3% white, 4.95% African American, .06% Native American, 4.52% Asian, .17% Pacific Islander, 1.05% from other races, and .95% from two or more races. Hispanic or Latino of any race were 3.71% of the population.

There were 1,430 households, out of which 45.2% had children under the age of 18 living with them, 81.4% were married couples living together, 5.9% had a female householder with no husband present, and 11.0% were non-families. 8.7% of all households were made up of individuals, and 3.1% had someone living alone who was 65 years of age or older. The average household size was 3.37 and the average family size was 3.58.

In the village, the population was spread out, with 33.7% under the age of 18, 5.9% from 18 to 24, 24.4% from 25 to 44, 27.0% from 45 to 64, and 9.1% who were 65 years of age or older. The median age was 36 years. For every 100 females, there were 99.2 males. For every 100 females age 18 and over, there were 95.4 males.

The median income for a household in the village was $91,613, and the median income for a family was $98,102. Males had a median income of $65,764 versus $42,734 for females. The per capita income for the village was $32,785. About 3.7% of families and 7.1% of the population were below the poverty line, including 8.3% of those under age 18 and 12.1% of those age 65 or over.

== Education ==
East Ramapo Central School District serves much of Wesley Hills, with Suffern Central School District (formerly Ramapo Central) serving a western portion.

== Place of interest ==
- Gurnee-Sherwood House - (NRHP)
