= Gurnee–Sherwood House =

Historic house in New York, United States

- U.S. National Register of Historic Places
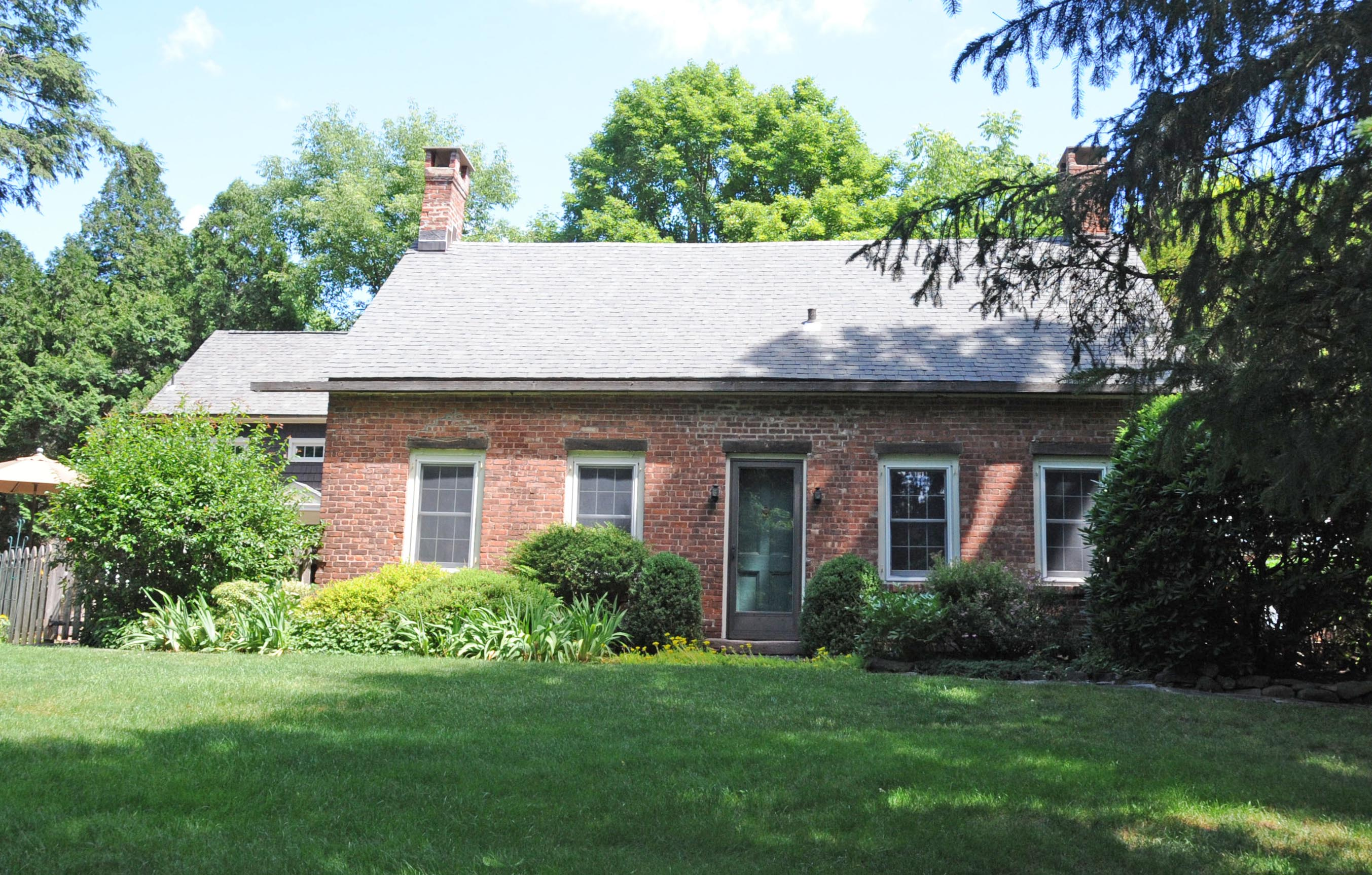

- Location within New York Location within the United States
- Location: 29 Spook Rock Road, Wesley Hills, New York
- Coordinates: 41°09′34″N 74°05′48″W
- Area: 1.54 acres (0.62 ha)
- Built: c. 1795
- Architectural style: Vernacular
- NRHP reference No.: 11000451
- Added to NRHP: July 19, 2011

Gurnee–Sherwood House, also known as the Gurnee–Onderdonck House, is a historic home located at Wesley Hills in Rockland County, New York. It was built about 1795, and is a 1 1/2-story, L-shaped, vernacular brick dwelling with stone ends. It has a recent frame addition. The original house features a saltbox profile, brick keying, and large stabilizing ashlar sandstone quoins.

It was listed on the National Register of Historic Places in 2011.
