= Ramapo, New York =

- Town
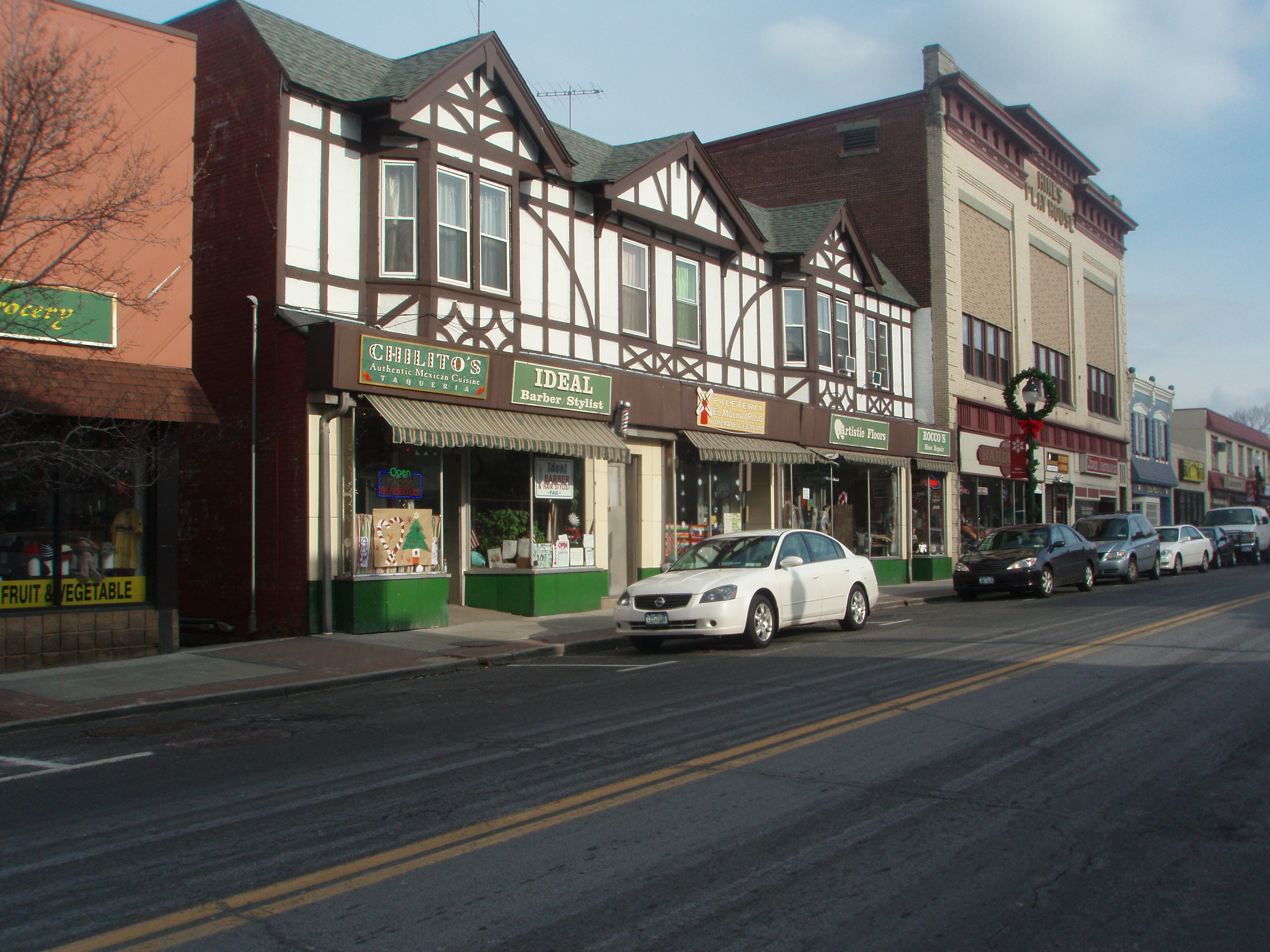
- Downtown Suffern, a village in Ramapo

- Seal

- Location in Rockland County and the state of New York.
- Coordinates: 41°7′19″N 74°5′0″W
- Country: United States
- State: New York
- County: Rockland

Government
  - Supervisor: Michael Specht (D)

Area
  - Total: 61.84 sq mi (160.16 km^{2})
  - Land: 61.14 sq mi (158.35 km^{2})
  - Water: 0.69 sq mi (1.80 km^{2})
- Elevation: 371 ft (113 m)

Population (2020)
  - Total: 148,919
  - Estimate (2025): 161,564 ▲
  - Density: 2,642/sq mi (1,020/km^{2})
- Time zone: UTC-5 (Eastern (EST))
  - Summer (DST): UTC-4 (EDT)
- ZIP code: 10901, 10952, 10977, 10970, 10965, 10974
- Area code: 845
- FIPS code: 36-60510
- GNIS ID: 0979406
- Website: https://www.ramapo.gov/

Ramapo (English pronunciation: /ˈɹæːməpoʊ/) is a town in Rockland County, New York, United States. It was originally formed as New Hampstead, in 1791, and became Ramapo in 1828. It shares its name with the Ramapo River. As of the 2020 census, Ramapo had a total population of 148,919, making it the most populous town in New York outside of Long Island. If all towns in New York were cities, Ramapo would be the 12th-largest city in the state of New York.

The town's name, recorded variously as Ramopuck, Ramapock, or Ramapough, is of Lenape origin, meaning either "sweet water" or "slanting rocks". Early maps referred to Ramapo as Ramepog (1695), Ramepogh (1711), and Ramapog (1775).

The town is located south of Haverstraw and west of Clarkstown and Orangetown.

== History ==
The present-day town was originally inhabited by the Munsee, a band of the Lenape nation. Their descendants now live on Stag Hill in Mahwah, New Jersey, where they form the New Jersey-recognized Ramapo Lenape Nation.

During the American Revolutionary War, Commander-in-Chief George Washington is said to have climbed the Ramapo Torne (near Sloatsburg) with a telescope to watch the July 24, 1777, sailing of the British fleet off Sandy Hook in New Jersey. General Washington and his troops set up an encampment in Suffern, in the west of Ramapo, due to its strategic location near a local mountain pass. In this encampment were two French soldiers, Jean-Baptiste Donatien de Vimeur, comte de Rochambeau and Gilbert du Motier, Marquis de Lafayette. The encampment was on the path to Yorktown, Virginia, where the final battle of the American Revolution took place.

The Town of New Hampstead was formed from part of the Town of Haverstraw in 1791, eight years after the end of the Revolution; the name was changed to Hempstead in 1797, and to Ramapo in 1828.

The first railroad line across Rockland County was built in 1841 and ran from Piermont to Ramapo. By 1851, the line was extended to Lake Erie, and was considered an engineering marvel.

Ramapo Iron Works, located near present-day State Route 17 at the base of Terse Mountain, was a producer of first cut nails made in America, wood screws, cotton cloth, and spring steel in the first half of the 19th century. Its founder, Jeremiah H. Pierson, was influential in building the Nyack Turnpike and the New York & Erie Railroad across the county. A cotton mill is still standing on the east side of the road.

In 1916, what would become State Route 59, which reached from Nyack to Spring Valley in 1915, was extended to Suffern and Hillburn.

Ramapo was one of the first municipalities to use Adequate Public Facilities acts to tier growth and infrastructure together. The 1971 court case Golden v. Planning Board of Ramapo is the basis for the subsequent expansion of growth management practices, including the use of development impact fees.

== Geography ==
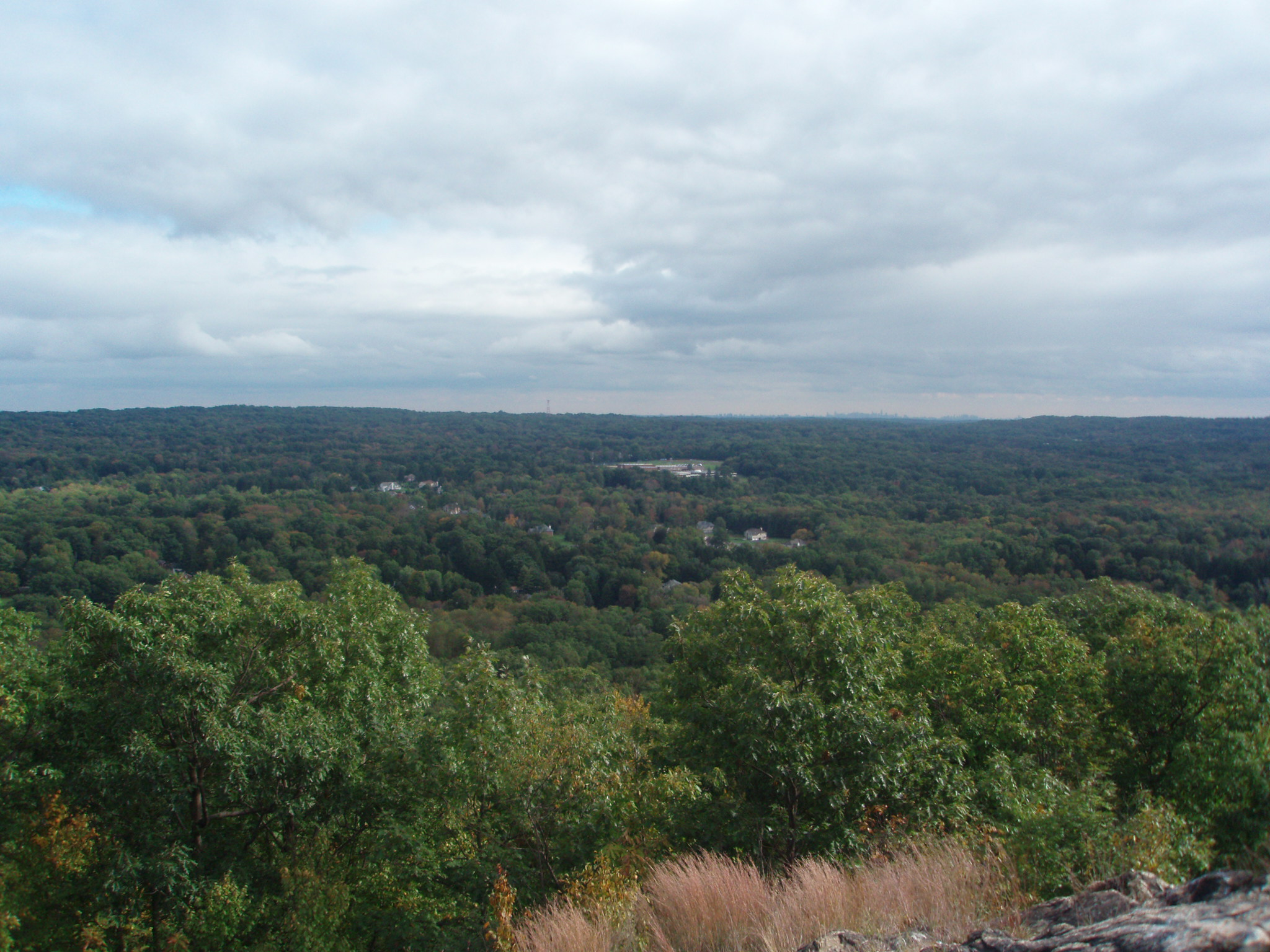
View of Ramapo from mountain

According to the United States Census Bureau, the town has a total area of 61.9 square miles (160 km^{2}), of which 61.2 square miles (159 km^{2}) is land and 0.7 square miles (1.8 km^{2}), or 1.11%, is water.

The southern town line is the border of New Jersey, and the western town line is the border of Orange County. The break in the Ramapo Mountains at Suffern formed by the Ramapo River causes the town to be the site of the New York State Thruway and I-287, New York State Route 17, and a railroad line. The Palisades Interstate Parkway runs through the northeastern corner of the town, with an exit at the Haverstraw town line on the northern border.

Torne Mountain (1,130 ft or 340 m; shown on topographic maps as "High Torne"), in Harriman State Park, overlooks the Ramapo Pass and remnants of the once-thriving Ramapo Iron Works. During the American Revolution, the Torne served as a lookout for British ship movements on the Hudson. Legend tells that Gen. George Washington lost his watch on the mountain, and it may still be heard ticking up there in a crevice of rock.

The highest point in Ramapo is Squirrel Swamp Mountain near the northern border of the town, with an elevation of 1,252 feet (382 m).

=== Communities ===
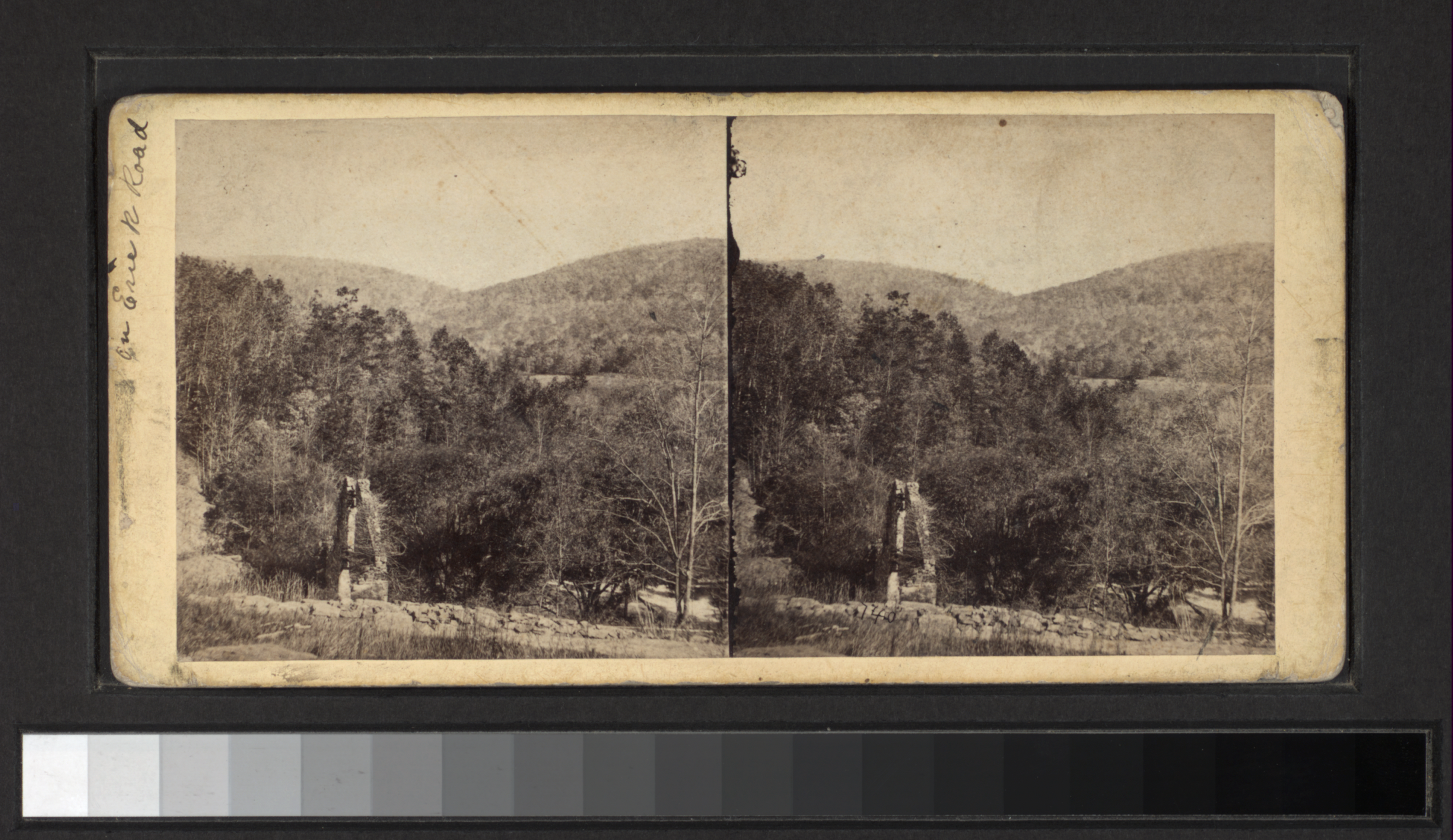
Ruins of the Old Furnace on the Ramapao, where the chain was made, that spanned the Hudson River at West Point during the Revolution

- The hamlet of Antrim, near the southern town line
- The village of Airmont
- The village of Chestnut Ridge
- The village of Hillburn, in the southwestern part of the town
- The hamlet of Hillcrest
- The village of Kaser
- The hamlet of Monsey
- The village of Montebello
- The village of New Hempstead
- The village of New Square
- The Village of Pomona
- The hamlet of Ramapo, in the southwest part of the town. The hamlet of Ramapo and the town of Ramapo are often confused on many internet-based maps.
- The hamlet of Sandyfield
- The village of Sloatsburg
- The village of Spring Valley
- The hamlet of Sterlington, near Sloatsburg
- The village of Suffern
- The hamlet of Suffern Park, near Suffern
- The hamlet of Tallman, in the southern part of the town
- The hamlet of Viola, in the eastern part of the town
- The village of Wesley Hills, in the northeastern part of the town

== Demographics ==
Historical population
Census	Pop.	Note	%±
1820	2,072		—
1830	2,837		36.9%
1840	3,222		13.6%
1850	3,197		−0.8%
1860	3,435		7.4%
1870	4,649		35.3%
1880	4,954		6.6%
1890	5,910		19.3%
1900	7,502		26.9%
1910	11,537		53.8%
1920	11,709		1.5%
1930	16,321		39.4%
1940	18,007		10.3%
1950	20,584		14.3%
1960	35,064		70.3%
1970	76,702		118.7%
1980	89,060		16.1%
1990	93,861		5.4%
2000	108,905		16.0%
2010	126,595		16.2%
2020	148,919		17.6%
2025 (est.)	161,564		8.5%
U.S. Decennial Census

As of the census of 2000, there were 108,905 people, 31,561 households, and 24,870 families residing in the town. The population density was 1,778.2 inhabitants per square mile (686.6/km^{2}). There were 32,422 housing units at an average density of 529.4 per square mile (204.4/km^{2}). The racial makeup of the town was 72.54% white, 17.04% African American, 0.32% Native American, 4.60% Asian, 0.07% Pacific Islander, 2.65% from other races, and 2.79% from two or more races. Hispanic or Latino of any race were 8.19% of the population.

There were 31,561 households, out of which 42.3% had children under the age of 18 living with them, 64.3% were married couples living together, 10.6% had a female householder with no husband present, and 21.2% were non-families. 17.2% of all households were made up of individuals, and 7.1% had someone living alone who was 65 years of age or older. The average household size was 3.37 and the average family size was 3.82.

In the town, the population was spread out, with 33.6% under the age of 18, 8.8% from 18 to 24, 26.0% from 25 to 44, 21.4% from 45 to 64, and 10.3% who were 65 years of age or older. The median age was 32 years. For every 100 females, there were 97.4 males. For every 100 females age 18 and over, there were 93.1 males.

The median income for a household in the town was $60,352, and the median income for a family was $67,004. Males had a median income of $46,286 versus $34,632 for females. The per capita income for the town was $22,868. About 11.5% of families and 16.3% of the population were below the poverty line, including 24.3% of those under age 18 and 8.8% of those age 65 or over.

As of the 2020 Census, there were 148,919 people residing in the Town of Ramapo.

== Landmarks ==
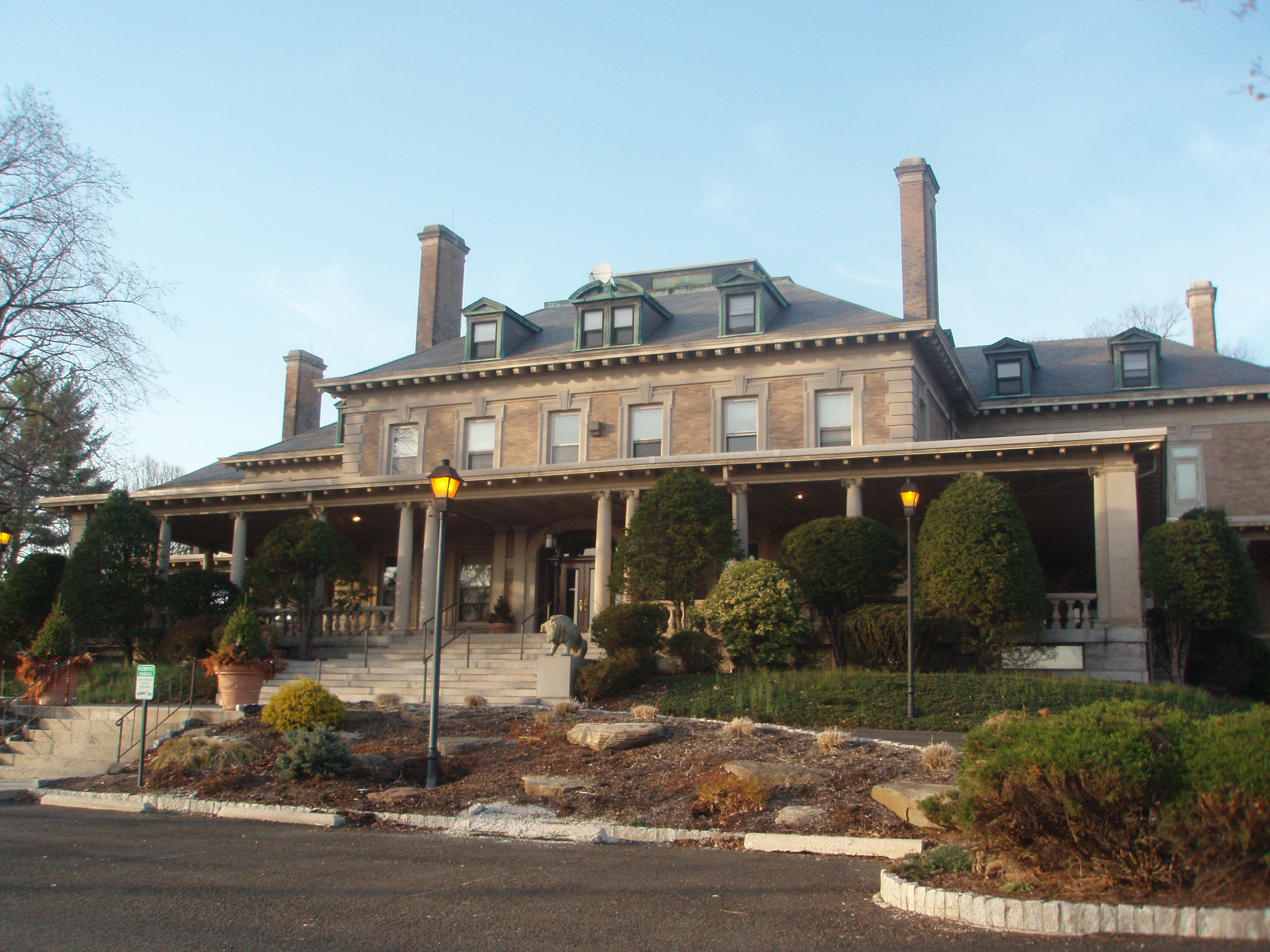
Ryan Mansion in Montebello

The New Hope Church is a historic Reformed Christian church in Monsey, established in 1824. The congregation continues to meet every Sunday in their building dedicated in 1869.

In August 1887, the Ryan family purchased the former Groesbeck mansion, which was built in the 1860s. The estate was called "Montebello" (which gave its name to the village in which it now lies). It now lies across from Suffern Middle School, which was built in 1942, nearly 80 years after the estate.

Torne Brook Farm, on the National Register of Historic Places, is located within the town.

== Recreation ==
The Joseph T. St. Lawrence Community, Health, and Sports Complex (aka "Torne Valley Recreation Center & Fields") was dedicated and opened on November 19, 2006. The facility features a turf multi-purpose field with stands to accommodate 1800 spectators, a separate climate-controlled dome, a 60 x 40 yard, and a turf practice area. It also features three multi-purpose indoor courts, a running track, cardio equipment, weight training machines, two racquetball courts, a computer room, and a dance/aerobic studio. Sports include football, lacrosse, soccer, baseball, and field hockey, as well as year-round sports programs that were not previously available to Ramapo residents. Although the residents of Ramapo have the exclusive right to join the Joseph T. St. Lawrence Community and Health Center, paid memberships are available to others.

The Ramapo Amateur Basketball Association (RABA) offers youth leagues for those 7–15 years old and adult leagues (18+). The Joseph T. St. Lawrence Center also hosts adult racquetball leagues.

The New York Boulders are a professional baseball team based just outside the village of Pomona and a member of the Frontier League. Christopher St. Lawrence pushed through the financing of the park even after residents voted it down. A state audit found that taxpayers could be liable for up to $60 million for Provident Bank Park in Ramapo.

== Government ==
Ramapo is run by a town supervisor, until May 19, 2017, Christopher St. Lawrence. In April 2016, federal prosecutors indicted St. Lawrence and a former town official, N. Aaron Troodler, on 22 counts of securities fraud, wire fraud, and conspiracy. The fraud related to a number of projects such as a minor league baseball stadium and condominium development, falsified accounting entries made to sell Town bonds to investors, and misappropriating funds from the town's special tax districts (such as its ambulance fund) to use in its general fund. Troodler pleaded guilty to a number of the fraud charges on March 7, 2017. Jury selection for St. Lawrence's trial began on April 18, 2017. St. Lawrence was convicted on May 19, 2017, of 20 felony charges. Following the conviction, Ramapo Deputy Supervisor Yitzchok Ullman announced that St. Lawrence is disqualified from serving as supervisor.

On November 7, 2017, Democrat Michael Specht was elected to become Ramapo's next town supervisor. Specht was sworn in on January 1, 2018.

Ramapo is represented in the United States House of Representatives by Mike Lawler. In state government it is represented by Senator Bill Weber, and assembly members Aron Wieder and Kenneth P. Zebrowski.

== Education ==
=== Colleges ===
Rockland Community College, a public two-year community college run by SUNY, is located in the CDP of Viola, about 4 miles (6 km) east of Suffern.

The Sunbridge Institute in Chestnut Ridge is a Waldorf-based adult learning center that specializes in training teachers. It offers master's degrees in education in collaboration with the State University of New York (SUNY).

=== Public schools ===
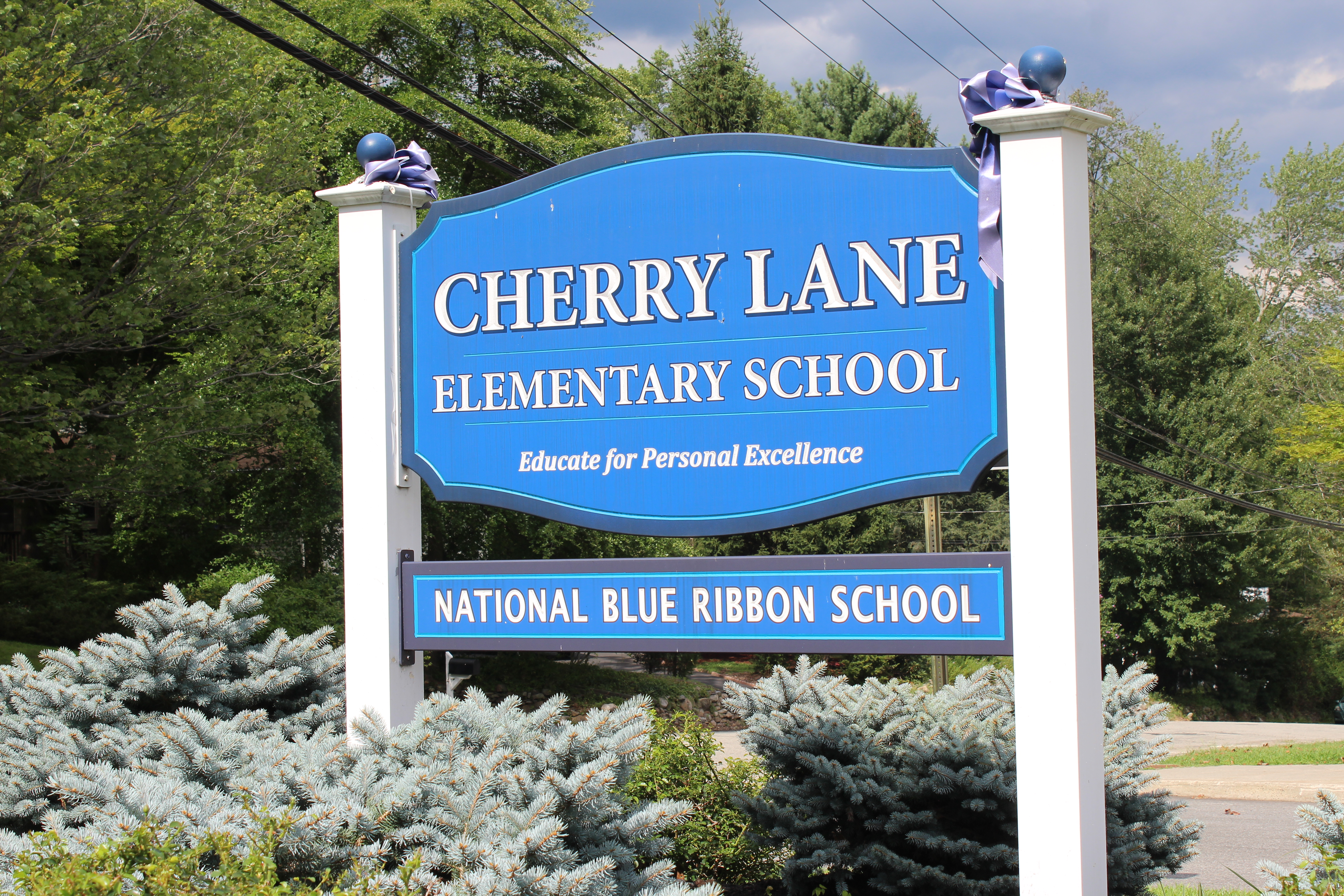
Cherry Lane Elementary School, located in the Village of Airmont. Cherry Lane is one of five elementary schools that help comprise Ramapo (Suffern) Central School District.

The town is served by two school districts. The western part of the town (Suffern, Montebello, Airmont, Sloatsburg. Hillburn) is primarily served by the Suffern Central School District, and the eastern part of the town (Spring Valley, Monsey, Pomona, Chestnut Ridge, New Hempstead) by the East Ramapo Central School District.

=== Suffern Central School District ===
The western half of Ramapo is served by the Suffern Central School District. Up until August 2017, the district was known as Ramapo Central, but the district and community sought a name change to avoid continuing confusing with East Ramapo Central School District. The name change was approved by Governor Andrew Cuomo. The district operates five elementary schools that go from grades K-5, Cherry Lane, Montebello, R.P. Connor, Sloatsburg, and Viola; one middle school that goes from grades 6–8, Suffern Middle School; and one high school, Suffern High School. Both the middle and high schools' mascots are mountain lions, known colloquially as "mounties." Cherry Lane Elementary was awarded with a National Blue Ribbon School of Excellence award from the U.S. Department of Education in 2013, and is one of four schools within the district to receive the New York State High Performing Reward School award by the New York State Department of Education in 2014. The other three schools include Montebello Elementary, Sloatsburg Elementary, and Suffern High School.

=== East Ramapo Central Central School District ===
The eastern half of Ramapo is served by the East Ramapo Central School District. The district operates four elementary schools that go from grades 1–3, Grandview, Summit Park, Fleetwood, and Margetts; and five elementaries that go from grades 4–6, Lime Kiln, Kakiat, Hempstead, Eldorado, and Elmwood; totaling nine elementary schools. It also operates two middle schools that go from grades 7–8, Pomona and Chestnut Ridge; and two high schools, Ramapo and Spring Valley. Spring Valley High's mascot is a tiger, and Ramapo High's is a griffin.

As of 2022, the district's public schools educate some 9,500 children, while about 30,000 children who live in the district and attend private schools, mostly yeshivas that serve a growing Orthodox and Hasidic Jewish community.

In 2005 the Orthodox Jewish population of the district received majority control of the school board. This new board began reducing the budget and lowering taxes. The communities using the public schools opposed these actions. In July 2010 the School Board of the East Ramapo Central School District voted to sell Hillcrest Elementary School — closed due to budget cuts — to the Hasidic Jewish Congregation Yeshiva Avir Yakov of New Square.

In 2010, the school board also voted to sell Merrill L. Colton Elementary School to Monsey-based Bais Malka Congregation and the Hebrew Academy for Special Children, a Brooklyn-based religious school for children with special needs. Transactions involving the two buildings were the focus of an ongoing state attorney general's investigation. Separately, hundreds of parent plaintiffs have also challenged them as part of their federal lawsuit against the district. The sale was finalized in 2014.

On June 30, 2011, former president of the East Ramapo Central School District Nathan Rothschild pleaded guilty to a mail fraud scheme which had been an attempt to eliminate his own private debt. The scheme involved selling public land to his creditors, then buying the land back at a higher price. He engaged in these activities as Fire Commissioner in Monsey. Questions arose as to whether the attempt to sell Hillcrest Elementary School was engineered for similar pursuits, as the sale of the 12-acre public school campus was engineered during his time in office as the school board president at East Ramapo Central School District.

In 2022, New York State Comptroller Tom DiNapoli announced that East Ramapo Central was the most "fiscally stressed" public school district in the state.

=== Private schools ===
Most private schools in Ramapo are Orthodox Jewish and Hasidic Jewish yeshivas, as almost half of the town's population is Jewish. Most yeshivas are located in the eastern part of the town. Some include Yeshiva Avnei Shlomo, Yeshiva Ohr Reuven, Yeshiva Darchei Noam, and Bais Yaakov Chofetz Chaim.

The sole Roman Catholic private school in the town is St. Joseph's School; Sacred Heart School closed in 2020. In addition, some Catholic county residents send their high school-aged sons to Don Bosco Preparatory High School in Ramsey, New Jersey.

There are four non-religious private schools in Ramapo: the Goddard School, the Skill Building Center, the Green Meadow Waldorf School, and the Rockland County Learning Center.

== Sister cities ==
In recognition of Ramapo's substantial cultural diversity, former Town Supervisor Herbert Reisman, along with many volunteers from the various communities in Ramapo, started the twinning program. This program is made up of committees that raise funds and organize trips to Ramapo's twin towns around the world, providing local high school students the opportunity to experience life in other countries.

There are currently seven active twinning committees in Ramapo:

- African Twinning Committee (Ghana)
- Chinese Twinning Committee (China)
- Indian Twinning Committee (India)
- Irish Twinning Committee (Doneraile, Ireland)
- Israeli Twinning Committee (Beit Shemesh, Israel)
- Italian Twinning Committee (Andretta, Italy)
- Philippine-American Twinning Committee (Makati, the Philippines)
