= Brick Church Complex (New Hempstead, New York) =

Historic church in New York, United States

- U.S. National Register of Historic Places
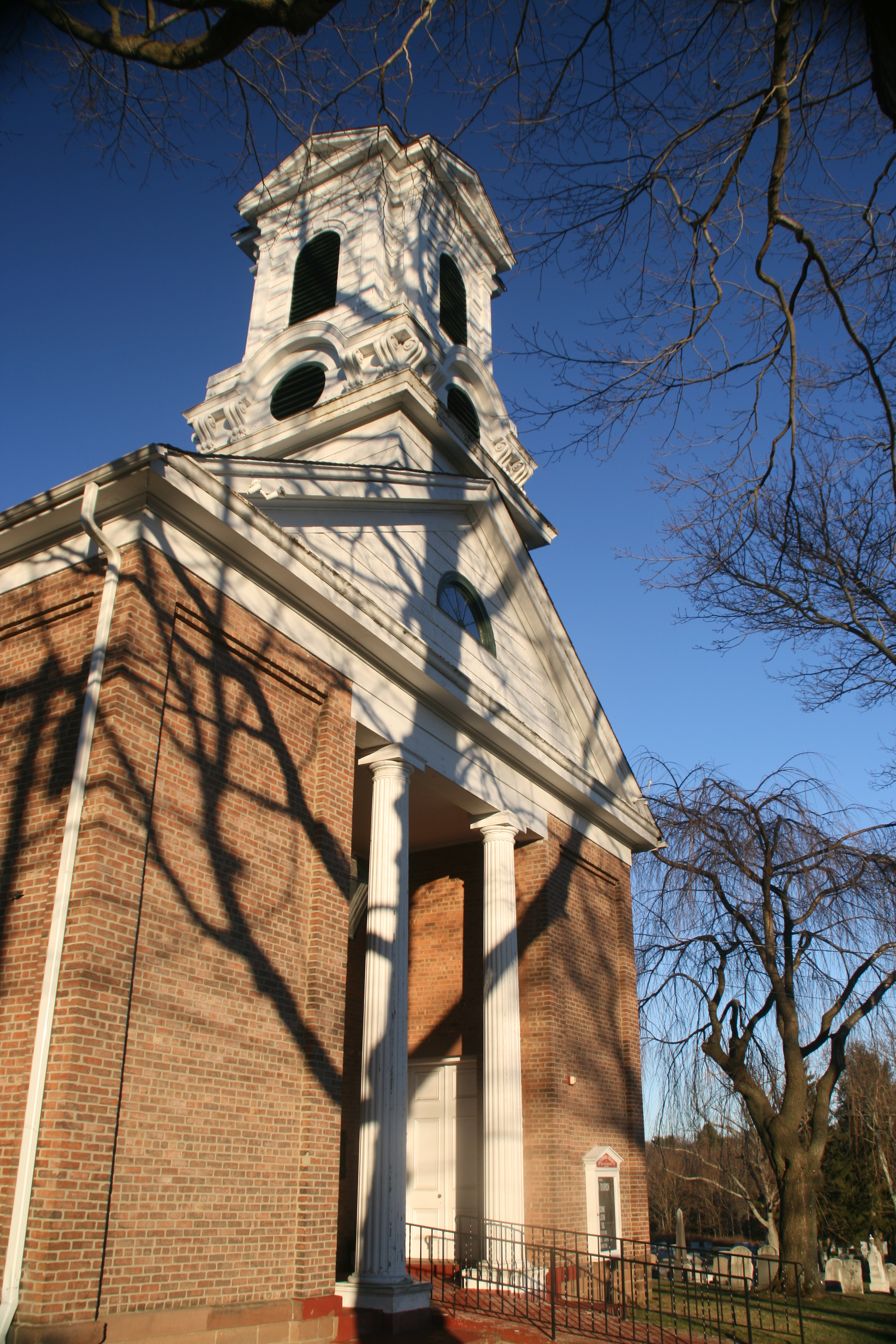

- Location within New York Location within the United States
- Location: Brick Church Rd. and NY 306; New Hempstead, New York
- Coordinates: 41°8′25″N 74°3′55″W
- Area: 4 acres (1.6 ha)
- Built: 1856
- NRHP reference No.: 84002947
- Added to NRHP: September 7, 1984

The Brick Church Complex is a historic Dutch Reformed church at Brick Church Road and NY 306 in New Hempstead, Rockland County, New York. The complex consists of the church, cemetery, school, and superintendent's house. The church was built in 1856 and has three brick elevations and a stone rear elevation. It features a large wood frame bell tower built in the late 19th century. It was listed on the National Register of Historic Places in 1984.

== Background ==
The "Reformed Dutch Church of West Hempstead," originally known as Kikiat and presently known as the Brick Church, was established in 1774.

== Gallery ==
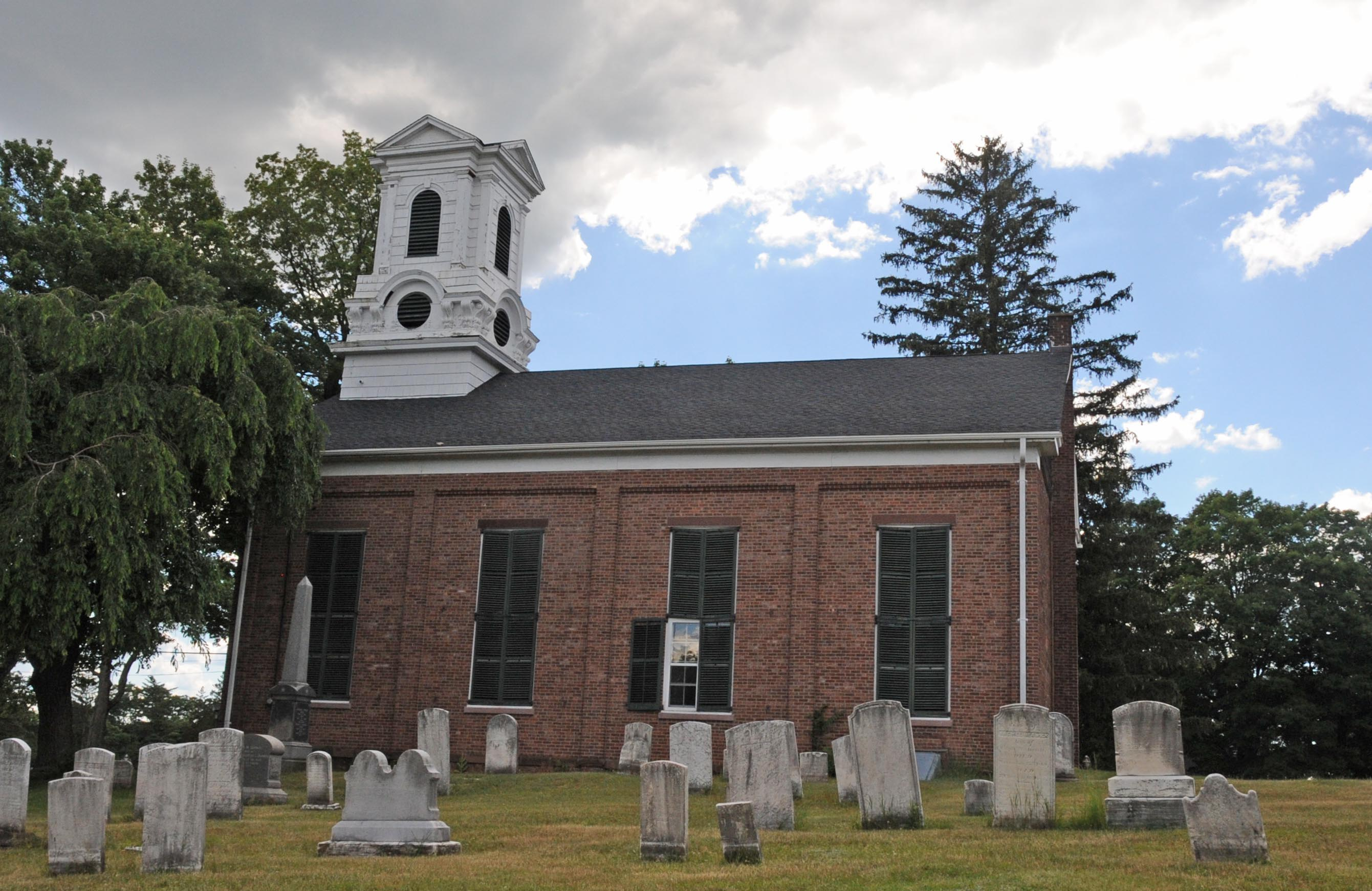
