= East Ramapo Central School District =

School district in Ramapo, New York, United States

Coordinates: 41.103384°N 74.049121°W

Location
- 105 South Madison Avenue, Spring Valley, New York 10977 United States

District information
- Type: Public
- Grades: Pre-K to 12
- Established: March 5, 1952
- Superintendent: Anthony DiCarlo (acting)
- Schools: 14

Students and staff
- Students: 10,409 (2024–2025)

Other information
- Website: District website

East Ramapo Central School District is a school district in Ramapo, New York, United States. It is headquartered in the Senator Eugene Levy Dr. Jack R. Anderson Education Center.

== History ==
=== 20th century ===
On March 4, 1952, seven school districts merged to form Ramapo Central School District No.2, due to centralization. On August 22, 1973, this district was renamed the East Ramapo Central School District.

The school district has seen major demographic changes since the late 1990s. In 1997, of the 18,000 children transported by the district, 10,500 were students of yeshiva private schools. Joseph Berger of The New York Times said in an article written during that year that this involved "a proportion of public school money to bus private school students that few American towns can match."

During that year, 9,500 of the children within the district were private school students from the Village of New Square, Village of Kaser, and the community of Monsey. A 1997 The New York Times article stated that some East Ramapo school district parents said that the high proportion of private school parents to public school parents could threaten the district. Harvey Katz, an Orthodox Jew who served as a school board member, said that "Just because my children are not in the public schools doesn't mean I don't care about all the children. Children are our future, wherever they may be." The district was one of five districts in New York State at the time, in which more students were enrolled in private school than in public school due to religious reasons.

=== 21st century ===
According to reporting by radio show This American Life, which ran an episode in 2014 called "A Not-So-Simple Majority", the Orthodox Jewish population and the remainder of the District had lived under a system of détente, where private Jewish schools, or yeshivas, of the Orthodox would not receive additional scrutiny in meeting state standards, if the Orthodox population would refrain from voting in school district elections. The Orthodox population broke the détente over special education needs, upset that special education children would not receive public funding at the private schools.

In 2005, the Orthodox Jewish population of the district gained majority control of the school board. This new board began reducing the budget and lowering taxes. The communities using the public schools have opposed these actions.

In a 2007 magazine article Dr. Mitchell Schwartz, the superintendent of the district, said that growing Hasidic yeshivas resulted in private school enrollment within the district increasing by a 3 to 4 percent increment per year.

By 2010, due to lowered taxes and reduced budgets, the district's finances had decreased and services were reduced at the schools, forcing students to take five- and six-year graduation plans instead of four-year plans.

On August 31, 2011, New York State Office of the Comptroller released an audit of the Board, for the period July 1, 2008 to April 13, 2010. The report criticizes the district for a number of serious lapses including failing to put $2.4 million in professional services contracts out to bid, allowing three senior school board members to receive health care through the school district's insurance pool after they failed to make $15,672 in payments, and failing to maintain proper inventory controls over $2.4 million in textbooks purchased for students not attending public schools, as required under state law. Most unsettling, the audit found that District officials inaccurately projected a June 30, 2010 fund balance of $13 million when preparing District's 2010-11 austerity budget that was presented to the electorate and on which cutbacks and layoffs were based. In fact, the District's audited financial statement showed a June 30, 2010, fund balance of $17,793,047, substantially higher than public estimates. The report states: "The board, along with district officials, failed to fulfill its stewardship, oversight and leadership responsibilities when it failed to establish a proper control environment, implement its own adopted policy and establish policies and procedures required by sound business practices." The report concludes. "The deficiencies exposed district funds and assets to abuse, waste and/or loss." The local paper headline was "East Ramapo bungled millions," and in a scathing editorial, the paper called for a thorough investigation of the board. In 2011, an article titled "Regions Aging Schools Crumble as Finances Falter," by Cathey O'Donnell and Gary Stern, was featured in a local newspaper, The Journal News, which is well known throughout the Lower Hudson Valley of Westchester County, New York. The article was about several old school buildings within the region that were in a current state of disrepair, how much it would cost to fix them, and which if any might need to be demolished. One of the school districts mentioned was East Ramapo.

The New York State Education Department ("SED") has directed [the] District to post the following letter of non-compliance (Archive), sent to the District by SED on December 19, 2012.

In March 2013 the Associated Press reported that there is much tension in the school district, because the local school board is accused of favoring private schools at the expense of public schools.

In April 2014, the group Rockland Clergy for Social Justice, which includes clerics from Christian, Jewish, and Muslim groups, asked Governor of New York Andrew Cuomo to intervene in the district.

In September 2014, additional attention was brought as the aforementioned episode of This American Life was aired. It was subsequently reaired in June 2017. In November 2014 a state-appointed monitor charged with investigating the district delivered a sharply critical assessment. The monitor, Hank Greenberg, said the board showed favoritism to Jewish students who attend private Orthodox schools in the district, and cut services to the 9,000 district students, mostly Black and Hispanic, who attend the district's public schools. Cuts included firing 15 special education teachers in the public school system while increasing funding for special education at the private yeshivas by 33%. It also included an increase of over $5 million in transportation for the private schools that the district was obliged to pay for, per New York State law. Greenberg accused the board of fiscal mismanagement and a lack of transparency in its dealings. In violation of state laws, it held most of its meetings behind closed doors, only let residents speak at the end of meetings, typically late at night, and inappropriately called critics antisemites. Greenberg recommended that the state provide resources that would be delivered more fairly, but stopped short of calling for a state take-over of the district. On June 11, 2015, New York state Assembly members passed a bill that would create a state monitor to oversee the school district.

By 2016, the state legislature and the school board were negotiating a budget compromise, but conflicts continued into 2017.

=== Lawsuits ===
In November 2017, a lawsuit was filed against the district in US District Court by parents of public school students, district residents, and the local chapter of the NAACP. The plaintiffs charged that by using at-large voting, it was impossible for minority candidates to win competitive elections in the district. The district president stated the district did not set the election rules and that the lawsuit would cost the district money. U.S. District Court Judge Cathy Seibel denied the districts motion to dismiss the case in April 2018. In 2020, Judge Seibel ruled in favor of the NAACP, finding that the district's election system violated the Voting Rights Act of 1965. She then ordered the district to abandon its at-large voting plan in favor of a neighborhood- or ward-based system that would increase the voting power of black and Latino voters. The district appealed the decision in January 2021 and then filed a second appeal.

The report from the state-appointed monitor found that the district had not replaced hundreds of teachers removed in 2008 and that the district has no social workers, despite having more economically disadvantaged students than any other district in Rockland County.

In January 2021, a court subsequently ruled that the district owed over $4.3 million in legal fees to the NYCLU who had brought the original suit. However the board threatened to fire hundreds of teachers in retaliation if the fees were not reduced to one dollar.

== Budget ==
For the 2022–2023 school year, the district proposed a budget of $262 million, a $10 million decrease from the 2021–2022 which was supplemented by federal funds due to the COVID-19 pandemic. The budget included $90 million for facilities upgrades, using federal funding, of all 14 of the district-owned buildings. However the proposed repairs were planned during the summer vacation, during which the school district had previously rented the buildings to private corporations for summer camps attended by Hasidic and Orthodox Jewish children. The first proposed budget failed on a vote held on May 17, 2022. On June 21, 2022, a second budget proposal was rejected by voters by a 2-1 margin, with a majority of opposed votes from wards with a large Jewish population. Because the proposal did not pass, the school will operate under its budget contingency plan for the 2022–2023 school year that limits the amount of revenue that can be collected and spent by the schools.

In 2022, the East Ramapo Central School District was reporting as having a $36 million deficit. However, a 2024 audit discovered an unexpected $30 million cash surplus in the district's budget; poor record-keeping had caused district officials to believe they had less money than they actually did.

== Location and service area ==
The school district serves areas of eastern Town of Ramapo, and portions of the towns of Clarkstown and Haverstraw. Communities included in the district include:

- The following villages: All of Chestnut Ridge, Kaser, New Hempstead, New Square, Spring Valley (which spans Ramapo and Clarkstown towns), almost all of Village of Pomona (which straddles the borders of Town of Ramapo and Town of Haverstraw), most of Wesley Hills, and portions of Airmont
- The following hamlets: Hillcrest and Monsey, half of Viola, and portions of Nanuet and New City

The district lies just to the east and borders the Suffern Central School District (formerly Ramapo Central), which serves much of the western portion of the Town of Ramapo, including Suffern, Sloatsburg, Hillburn, Montebello, and much of Airmont, excluding the extreme eastern portion of the village.

== Demographics ==
As of 2020, there were approximately 11,000 students attending public schools in the district, with another 27,000 students attending private schools, mostly yeshivas. Approximately 96% of public-school students were black or Latino.

== Schools ==
=== Pre-kindergarten and Kindergarten ===
- Early Childhood Center (Spring Valley)

=== Grades K-3 ===
- Fleetwood Elementary School (Chestnut Ridge)
- Grandview Elementary School (Monsey)
- Margetts Elementary School (Chestnut Ridge)
- Summit Park Elementary School (New City)

=== Grades 4-6 ===
- Eldorado Elementary School (Chestnut Ridge)
- Elmwood Elementary School (Monsey)
- Lime Kiln Elementary School (Wesley Hills)

=== Grades K-6 ===
- Hempstead Elementary School (New Hempstead)

=== STEAM Academy ===
- Kakiat STEAM Academy (Spring Valley) (4-8)

=== Middle schools (Grades 7-8) ===
- Chestnut Ridge Middle School (Chestnut Ridge)
- Pomona Middle School (Pomona)

=== High schools ===
- Spring Valley High School (Spring Valley)
- Ramapo High School (Spring Valley)

=== Former schools ===
- Merrill L. Colton Elementary School (New Hempstead)
- Hillcrest Elementary School (New City)
- Monsey School
- Bluefield Elementary School
- South Madison School
- Kakiat Junior High School
- Ramapo Freshman Center

==== Sale of Hillcrest Elementary School ====
In July 2010 the School Board of the East Ramapo Central School District voted to sell Hillcrest Elementary School—closed due to budget cuts—to the Hasidic Jewish Congregation Yeshiva Avir Yakov of New Square. On June 8, 2011, the sale was blocked by the state due to a dispute of the school's appraisal. In an official response to an investigation of the sale, New York State Education Commissioner David Steiner stated the East Ramapo board “abused its discretion by hastily approving the sale.” The 12-acre campus, assessed at $10.2 million by the Assessor’s Office of Clarkstown was given only a $3.2 million appraisal by the school board's own attorney, Albert D’Agostino. The sale eventually went through for $4.9 million.

==== Sale of Colton Elementary School ====
New York State Education Commissioner John King also put a hold on the district's sale of Colton Elementary to Congregation Bais Malka/Hebrew Academy for Special Children with similar questions over the appraisal and bidding process as dogged the blocked sale of the Hillcrest school. This school was eventually sold in 2014.

== See also ==
- Kiryas Joel School District
- Lawrence Public Schools (New York)
