= Airmont, New York =

- Village
- Location in Rockland County and the state of New York.

- Location within the state of New York
- Coordinates: 41°5′57″N 74°6′0″W
- Country: United States
- State: New York
- County: Rockland
- Town: Ramapo
- Incorporated: 1991

Government
  - Mayor: Nathan R. Bubel
  - Deputy Mayor: Shimon Moses
  - Trustees: Morris Friedman, Laurence O. Toole, and Isaac Weiss

Area
  - Total: 4.57 sq mi (11.83 km^{2})
  - Land: 4.56 sq mi (11.82 km^{2})
  - Water: 0 sq mi (0.00 km^{2})
- Elevation: 584 ft (178 m)

Population (2020)
  - Total: 10,166
  - Estimate (2025): 10,634 ▲
  - Density: 2,327/sq mi (898/km^{2})
- Time zone: UTC-5 (EST)
  - Summer (DST): UTC-4 (EDT)
- ZIP code: 10952, 10901
- Area code: 845 329
- FIPS code: 36-00408
- GNIS feature ID: 2391502
- Website: www.airmont.org

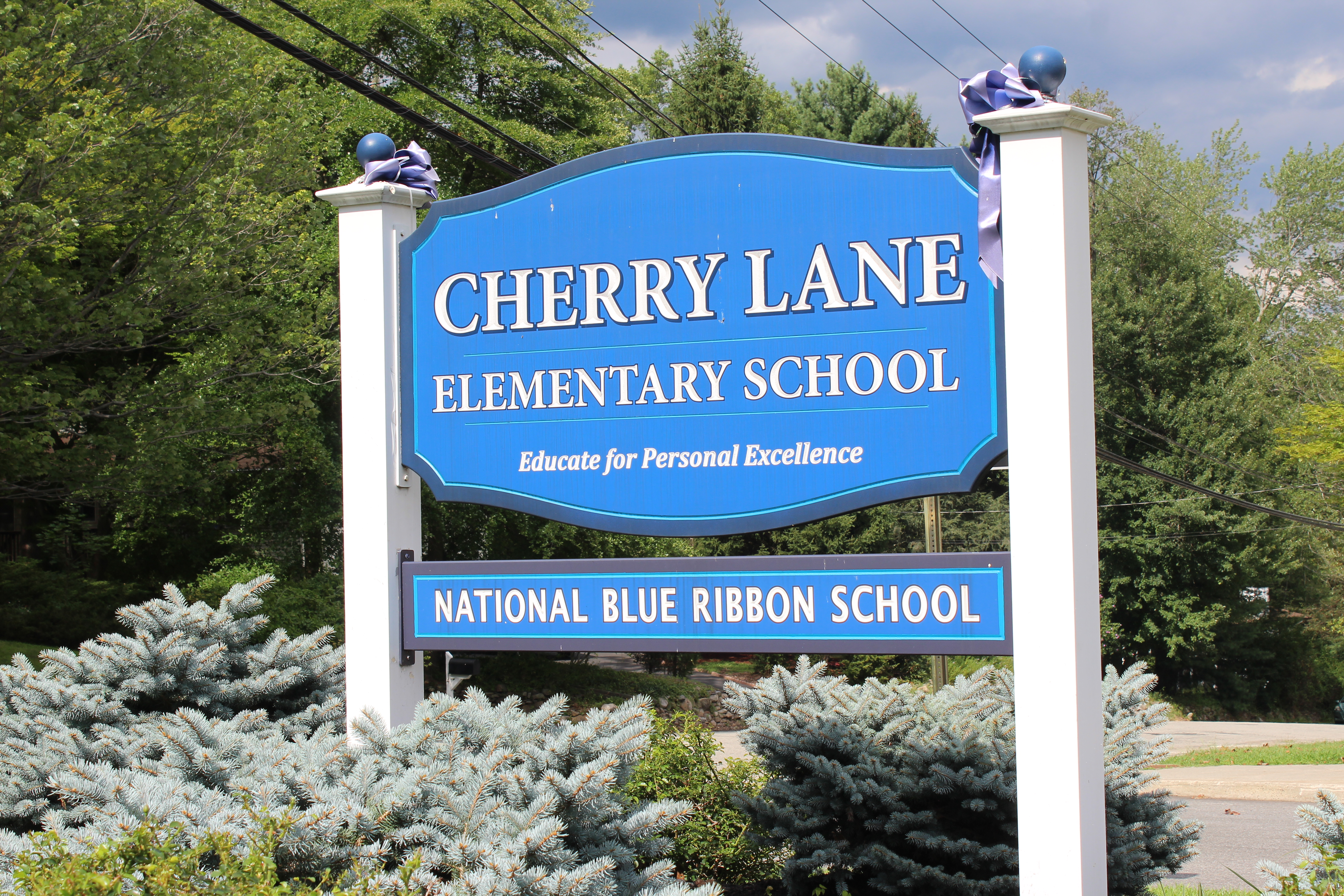
Cherry Lane Elementary, one of the five elementary schools within the Suffern Central School District, was awarded the National Blue Ribbon of Excellence award in 2013. The elementary serves much of Airmont.

Airmont (/ˈɛərrmɒnt/) is a village in the town of Ramapo, Rockland County, New York, United States, located north of the state of New Jersey, east of Suffern, south of Montebello, and west of Chestnut Ridge. The population was 10,166 at the 2020 census.

The village of Airmont, incorporated in 1991, is a consolidation of the hamlets of Tallman, Airmont and South Monsey. Joseph Berger of The New York Times wrote in a 1997 article that Airmont was one of several Ramapo villages formed "to preserve the sparse Better Homes and Garden [sic] ambiance that attracted them to Rockland County." In 2005, Peter Applebome of The New York Times said that Airmont was "slapped around enough by the courts to be something other than a virginal player in any discrimination case" since it ran into legal resistance to its development laws.

== History ==
In April 1991, creation of the village of Airmont was allowed in the town. Airmont had 9,500 people, including around 250 Orthodox Jews and many non-Orthodox Jews. The founders of the town said that they intended for "strong zoning" to preserve the character of the community. William P. Barr, the United States Attorney General, and Otto G. Obermaier, the United States Attorney for the Southern District of New York, filed a suit against Airmont and the town of Ramapo; Barr and Obermaier said that Airmont created a zoning plan intended to exclude Orthodox Jews from living in the village and "that other individuals acting at the behest of the defendants have engaged in a pattern of harassment against Orthodox Jews in the village." The officials cited the Fair Housing Act as the relevant law. The plaintiffs said that, because many Orthodox do not travel by car on Saturdays, preventing the creation of a synagogue would exclude Orthodox from the community. The Anti-Defamation League of B'nai B'rith supported the suit. The Spring Valley Chapter of the National Association for the Advancement of Colored People had opposed the creation of Airmont. As a result of the suit Airmont revised its zoning code to allow religious sites. Airmont's zoning restricted synagogues to 2-acre (8,100 m^{2}) lots, which were too costly for most Orthodox congregations. A federal judge ruled that the code was discriminatory and ordered Airmont to revise the code; the legal case continued by 1997.

Around 2005, Congregation Mischknois Lavier Yakov proposed building a yeshiva and a boarding school with a 70-adult student dormitory (with provisions for their families, which could result in a population of several hundred individuals) on 19 acres (77,000 m^{2}) of land. Town residents opposed this, causing legal action including meetings and lawsuits. In 2005, the U.S. federal government filed a civil rights lawsuit accusing Airmont of discriminating on the basis of religion and violating the Religious Land Use and Institutionalized Persons Act (RLUIPA) and the Fair Housing Act by banning boarding houses.

In 2011, Airmont and the federal government reached a settlement and Airmont agreed to amend its zoning code to allow Mischknois Lavier Yakov to build a school with student housing. The agreement included a $10,000 civil penalty against Airmont and marked the second time federal prosecutors had intervened in Airmont zoning affairs since its 1991 incorporation. In 2018 nothing has happened and the zoning has expired. The congregation complex will most likely never happen.

On December 2, 2020, the Department of Justice filed another lawsuit, alleging that there was religious discrimination through land use policies that violate previous court rulings and federal law.

In September 2021, the Republican deputy mayor of Airmont, Brian Downey, was arrested on multiple weapons charges after police discovered 16 assault weapons, 13 illegal silencers, and other guns and gun parts inside his home while executing a search warrant. Investigators also found a stash of fake IDs, including fake FBI credentials. In February 2023, Downey pled guilty to a federal gun charge as part of a plea deal; by pleading guilty to a felony, he automatically forfeited his position as deputy mayor under New York state law.

In October 2023, the Department of Justice settled its discrimination lawsuit with the village, over zoning of places of worship. Negotiation of the settlement was assisted by the fact that, since the lawsuit had been filed, control of the Village Board had passed to the local Hasidic community and its allies.

== Geography ==
Airmont is located at 41°5′57″N 74°6′0″W (41.099163, -74.100011).

According to the United States Census Bureau, the village has a total area of 4.6 square miles (12 km^{2}), all land.

The southern boundary of the village is the border of New Jersey.

== Demographics ==
Historical population
| Census | Pop. | Note | %± |
|---|---|---|---|
| 2000 | 7,799 | | — |
| 2010 | 8,628 | | 10.6% |
| 2020 | 10,166 | | 17.8% |
| 2025 (est.) | 10,634 | | 4.6% |
U.S. Decennial Census

=== 2020 census ===
As of the 2020 census, Airmont had a population of 10,166. The population density was 2,226.9 people per square mile, compared with 1,858.3 in 2010. The median age was 29.4 years. 37.2% of residents were under the age of 18 and 15.6% of residents were 65 years of age or older. For every 100 females there were 98.1 males, and for every 100 females age 18 and over there were 91.3 males age 18 and over.

100.0% of residents lived in urban areas, while 0.0% lived in rural areas.

There were 2,638 households in Airmont, of which 46.1% had children under the age of 18 living in them. Of all households, 67.1% were married-couple households, 9.4% were households with a male householder and no spouse or partner present, and 21.0% were households with a female householder and no spouse or partner present. About 17.4% of all households were made up of individuals and 11.7% had someone living alone who was 65 years of age or older.

There were 2,765 housing units, of which 4.6% were vacant. The homeowner vacancy rate was 1.3% and the rental vacancy rate was 3.2%.

Racial composition as of the 2020 census
| Race | Number | Percent |
|---|---|---|
| White | 8,103 | 79.7% |
| Black or African American | 377 | 3.7% |
| American Indian and Alaska Native | 61 | 0.6% |
| Asian | 431 | 4.2% |
| Native Hawaiian and Other Pacific Islander | 11 | 0.1% |
| Some other race | 600 | 5.9% |
| Two or more races | 583 | 5.7% |
| Hispanic or Latino (of any race) | 1,014 | 10.0% |

=== 2000 census ===
As of the census of 2000, there were 7,799 people, 2,342 households, and 2,032 families residing in the village. The population density was 1,701.3 inhabitants per square mile (656.9/km^{2}). There were 2,362 housing units at an average density of 515.2 per square mile (198.9/km^{2}). The racial makeup of the village was 86.3% white, 3.5% African American, .17% Native American, 2.53% Asian, .03% Pacific Islander, 1% from other races, and 1.36% from two or more races. Hispanic or Latino of any race were 5.26% of the population.

There were 2,342 households, out of which 41.8% had children under the age of 18 living with them, 78.0% were married couples living together, 5.9% had a female householder with no husband present, and 13.2% were non-families. 11.3% of all households were made up of individuals, and 5.8% had someone living alone who was 65 years of age or older. The average household size was 3.20 and the average family size was 3.47.

In the village, the population was spread out, with 27.9% under the age of 18, 6.0% from 18 to 24, 25.4% from 25 to 44, 26.9% from 45 to 64, and 13.8% who were 65 years of age or older. The median age was 39 years. For every 100 females, there were 95.1 males. For every 100 females age 18 and over, there were 90.0 males.

The median income for a household in the village was $87,678, and the median income for a family was $97,960. Males had a median income of $67,663 versus $36,550 for females. The per capita income for the village was $29,788. About 1.6% of families and 3.3% of the population were below the poverty line, including 2.2% of those under age 18 and 5.9% of those age 65 or over.

=== Income and poverty ===
The median household income was $98,750, and the per capita income was $34,051. 10.9% of the population were under the poverty line.

== Government ==
The village is governed by a mayor and board of trustees.

== Tourism ==
=== Historical markers ===
- Christ Evangelical Lutheran Church - Church and Airmont roads
- Dogwoods - 24 DeBaun Avenue

=== Landmark and places of interest ===
- Christ Evangelical Lutheran Church was founded in 1715, by Palatine Germans in Mahwah, New Jersey. The church was incorporated in Rockland County in 1850, and the current edifice built in 1855.
- Challenger Center for Space Science Education
- Spook Rock, near Airmont, is the largest of the cluster of rocks located on Spook Rock Road and Highview Avenue in Airmont. The Tappan and Warawankogs of the Lenni-Lenape wolf tribes, members of the Algonquin Nation worshiped the sun, moon, stars, and a spirit called Manitou.

== Education ==
Most of Airmont is within the Suffern Central School District (formerly Ramapo Central). Zoned schools include Cherry Lane Elementary School (2013 National Blue Ribbon School), Suffern Middle School, and Suffern High School (New York State Reward School).

Some residents, particularly in the far eastern portion of the village, are zoned to East Ramapo Central School District.

Central United Talmudical Academy of Monsey is in Airmont.

Rockland Community College, part of the SUNY system, is near Airmont.

== Notable person ==
- Lipa Schmeltzer (1978 - ) is an American Hasidic singer and composer
