= Kaser, New York =

- Village
- Location in Rockland County and the state of New York.

- Location within the state of New York
- Coordinates: 41°7′17″N 74°4′1″W
- Country: United States
- State: New York
- County: Rockland
- Town: Ramapo
- Incorporated: January 25, 1990

Government
  - Mayor: Allie Pinkasovits
  - Trustees: Shlomo Koening, Lipot Muller, Eugene D. Neiman, and Israel Rosenberg

Area
  - Total: 0.17 sq mi (0.44 km^{2})
  - Land: 0.17 sq mi (0.44 km^{2})
  - Water: 0 sq mi (0.00 km^{2})
- Elevation: 541 ft (165 m)

Population (2020)
  - Total: 5,491
  - Estimate (2025): 6,121 ▲
  - Density: 36,005/sq mi (13,902/km^{2})
- Time zone: UTC-5 (Eastern (EST))
  - Summer (DST): UTC-4 (EDT)
- FIPS code: 36-38934
- GNIS feature ID: 0979944

Kaser (English pronunciation: /ˈkeɪzəɹ/ or /ˈkɑːsəɹ/ from Yiddish: כּתר, romanized: keser, lit. 'crown') is a village in the town of Ramapo, Rockland County, New York, United States. The village is completely surrounded by the hamlet of Monsey. As of the 2020 United States census, the village population was 5,491.

Kaser is a village with a population consisting almost entirely of Hasidic Jews of the Viznitz denomination. A total of 4% of Kaser's population claims Romanian ancestry, making Kaser the most Romanian census place in the United States.

The village is the most densely populated municipality in New York State according to the 2010 census, being the only incorporated place in the state with a higher population density than New York City, and the 5th most in the United States.

== History ==
Members of Viznitz, a Hasidic denomination, established Kaser in 1990 so they could build denser housing. Herbert Reisman, the supervisor of the town of Ramapo, cooperated in the creation of Kaser because the town leaders also wanted to create more housing.

== Geography ==
The village of Kaser is on NY 306.

According to the United States Census Bureau, the village has a total area of 0.2 square mile (0.4 km^{2}), all land.

== Demographics ==
Historical population
Census	Pop.	Note	%±
2000	3,316		—
2010	4,724		42.5%
2020	5,491		16.2%
2025 (est.)	6,121		11.5%
U.S. Decennial Census

=== 2020 census ===
As of the 2020 census, Kaser had a population of 5,491. The median age was 14.0 years. 57.9% of residents were under the age of 18 and 3.9% of residents were 65 years of age or older. For every 100 females there were 101.5 males, and for every 100 females age 18 and over there were 100.9 males age 18 and over.

100.0% of residents lived in urban areas, while 0.0% lived in rural areas.

There were 1,066 households in Kaser, of which 74.4% had children under the age of 18 living in them. Of all households, 86.8% were married-couple households, 6.3% were households with a male householder and no spouse or partner present, and 6.7% were households with a female householder and no spouse or partner present. About 7.4% of all households were made up of individuals and 3.0% had someone living alone who was 65 years of age or older.

There were 1,124 housing units, of which 5.2% were vacant. The homeowner vacancy rate was 2.7% and the rental vacancy rate was 2.3%.

Racial composition as of the 2020 census
Race	Number	Percent
White	5,251	95.6%
Black or African American	5	0.1%
American Indian and Alaska Native	5	0.1%
Asian	2	0.0%
Native Hawaiian and Other Pacific Islander	0	0.0%
Some other race	134	2.4%
Two or more races	94	1.7%
Hispanic or Latino (of any race)	38	0.7%

=== 2010 census ===
As of 2010 census, 99.5% of the population was white.

=== 2000 census ===
As of the 2000 census, there were 3,314 people, 1647 households, and 1617 families residing in the village. The population density was 19,342.6 inhabitants per square mile (7,468.2/km^{2}). There were 678 housing units at an average density of 3,954.9 per square mile (1,527.0/km^{2}). The racial makeup of the village was 98.61% white, .24% African American, .45% Asian, .03% Pacific Islander, and .66% from two or more races. Hispanic or Latino of any race were .54% of the population.

There were 1647 households, out of which 79.1% had children under the age of 18 living with them, 90.9% were married couples living together, 3.7% were female households with no husband present, and 4.5% were non-families. 3.2% of all households were individuals, and 1.9% had someone living alone who was 65 years of age or older. The average household size was 4.89 and the average family size was 5.04.

In the village, the population was spread out, with 53.4% under the age of 18, 18.2% from 18 to 24, 16.8% from 25 to 44, 6.2% from 45 to 64, and 5.4% who were 65 years of age or older. The median age was 16 years. For every 100 females, there were 99.4 males. For every 100 females age 18 and over, there were 93.7 males. The median income for a household in the village was $13,125, and the median income for a family was $13,191. Males had a median income of $20,500 versus $19,792 for females. The per capita income for the village was $5,147. About 65.0% of families and 66.4% of the population were below the poverty threshold, including 68.9% of those under age 18 and 43.4% of those age 65 or over. The village population grew by 43% from 2000 to 2010.

== Government ==
As of 1997, the town of Ramapo provides police. As of 2022, the village of Kaser provides garbage pickup services for Kaser residents.

== Notable people ==
- Rabbi Mordechai Hager, leader of Viznitz (1965−2018)
- Isaac Hager, Brooklyn real estate developer (born in Kaser)

== See also ==
- New Square, New York − an all-Hasidic village in the same county.
- Kiryas Joel, New York − an all-Hasidic coterminous town-village in neighboring Orange County.
