= Suffern Central School District =

School district in Rockland County, New York, United States

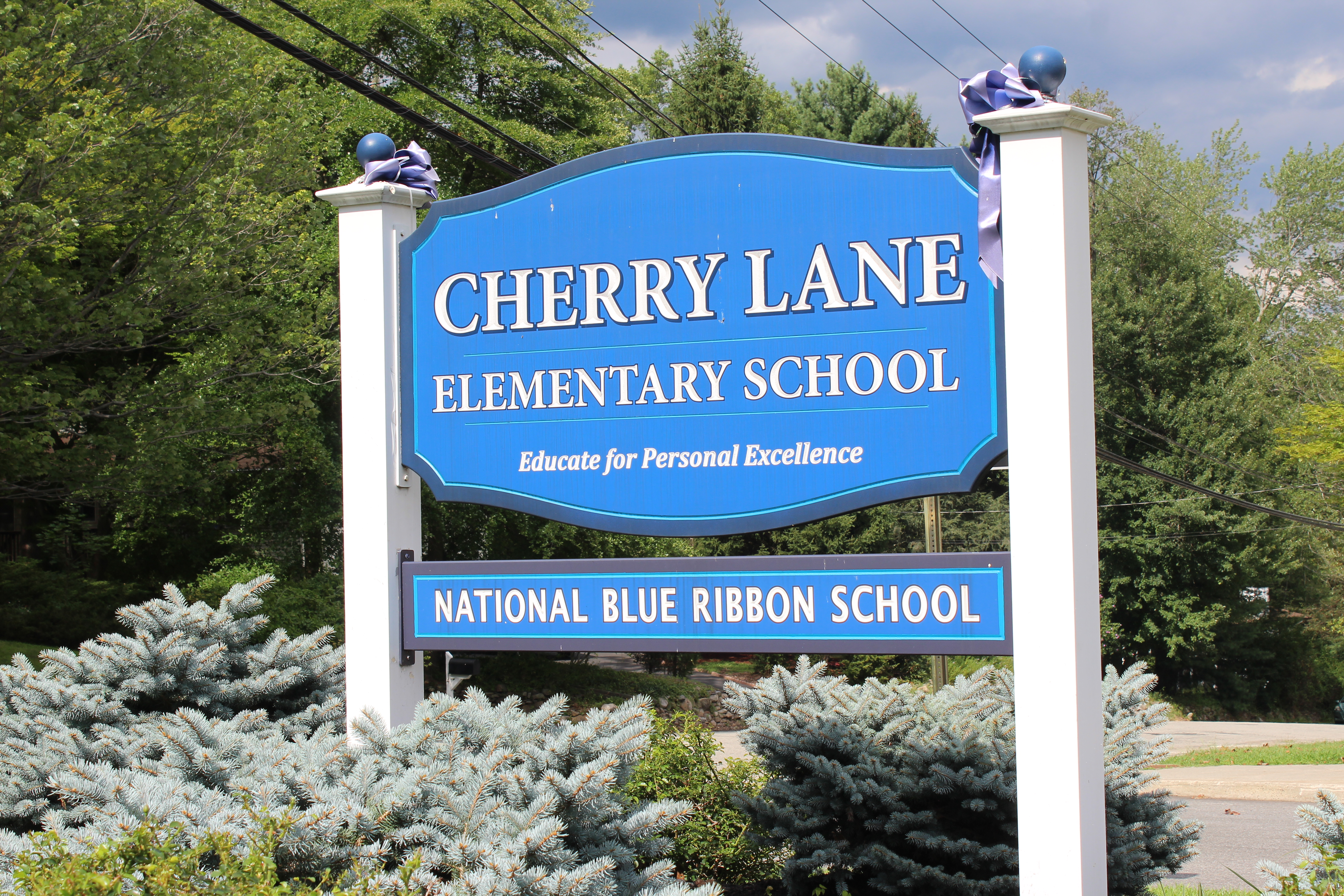
- Cherry Lane Elementary, in Airmont, NY, was awarded the National Blue Ribbon of Excellence award in 2013.
- 45 Mountain Avenue; Hillburn, NY 10931

District information
- Grades: PreK to 12
- Superintendent: Dr. P. Erik Gundersen
- Schools: 6

Students and staff
- Enrollment: 4,518 (as of 2014–15)
- Faculty: 371.3 FTEs
- Student–teacher ratio: 12.2:1

Other information
- Website: www.sufferncentral.org

Suffern Central School District, formerly the Ramapo Central School District, is a school district headquartered in Hillburn, a village in the Town of Ramapo in Rockland County, New York, United States. It is located north of Suffern; east of Orange County, New York; south of Viola and west of Montebello.

As of the 2014–15 school year, the district and its seven schools had an enrollment of 4,518 students and 371.3 classroom teachers (on an FTE basis), for a student–teacher ratio of 12.2:1.

The Suffern Central School District serves the villages of Airmont, Hillburn, Montebello, Sloatsburg, Suffern (including Viola), and a portion of Monsey. Its middle school and high school are named for Suffern.

The six villages together have a combined population of 46,926, according to the 2000 census, and takes up 20.9 square miles (54 km^{2}) which makes the population density for the area the district serves about 2,245.26 people per square mile.

Several of the schools within the district have the privilege of being designated High Performing Reward Schools by the New York State Education Department in August 2014. These schools include Cherry Lane Elementary, Montebello Elementary, Sloatsburg Elementary, and Suffern High School. Suffern High School was once again named a High Performing Reward School for the 2016–2017 academic year. In addition to being named a Reward School, Cherry Lane Elementary also received the title of being a National Blue Ribbon School by the United States Department of Education in 2013.

== History ==
Until the 1940s, some of the schools in the district were racially segregated, until the desegregation of the previously all-black Brooks School in 1943. Thurgood Marshall who served as Associate Justice of the U.S. Supreme Court, litigated this case as head of the NAACP legal team. Marshall later litigated and won Brown v. Board of Education of Topeka (Kansas).

In late 2016, the Ramapo Central School District began to explore the possibility of officially changing its name in order to avoid continuing confusion with the nearby East Ramapo Central School District. It was announced in June 2017 that the New York State Legislature approved of the name change and the bill was signed by Governor Andrew Cuomo', changing the name to "Suffern Central School District."

In October 2023, the district announced that it was considering closing Viola Elementary School in Montebello, due to declining public-school enrollment driven by demographic shifts, as more families opt for Orthodox Jewish yeshivas in the area. At the same time, the four remaining elementary schools would be realigned; while currently they are all K–5, the plan under consideration would make two K–2 only and the other two 3–5 only.

== Schools ==
Elementary schools All of the districts elementary schools are K-5

- Richard P. Connor Elementary School (Suffern) (RPC), formerly Cypress Road Elementary School
- Montebello Elementary School (Montebello), formerly Montebello Road Elementary School
- Viola Elementary School (Montebello)
- Cherry Lane Elementary School (Airmont)
- Sloatsburg Elementary School (Sloatsburg)

Middle school

- 6-8: Suffern Middle School

High school

- 9-12: Suffern High School
