= Suffern High School =

Public school in New York state

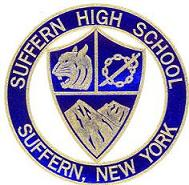

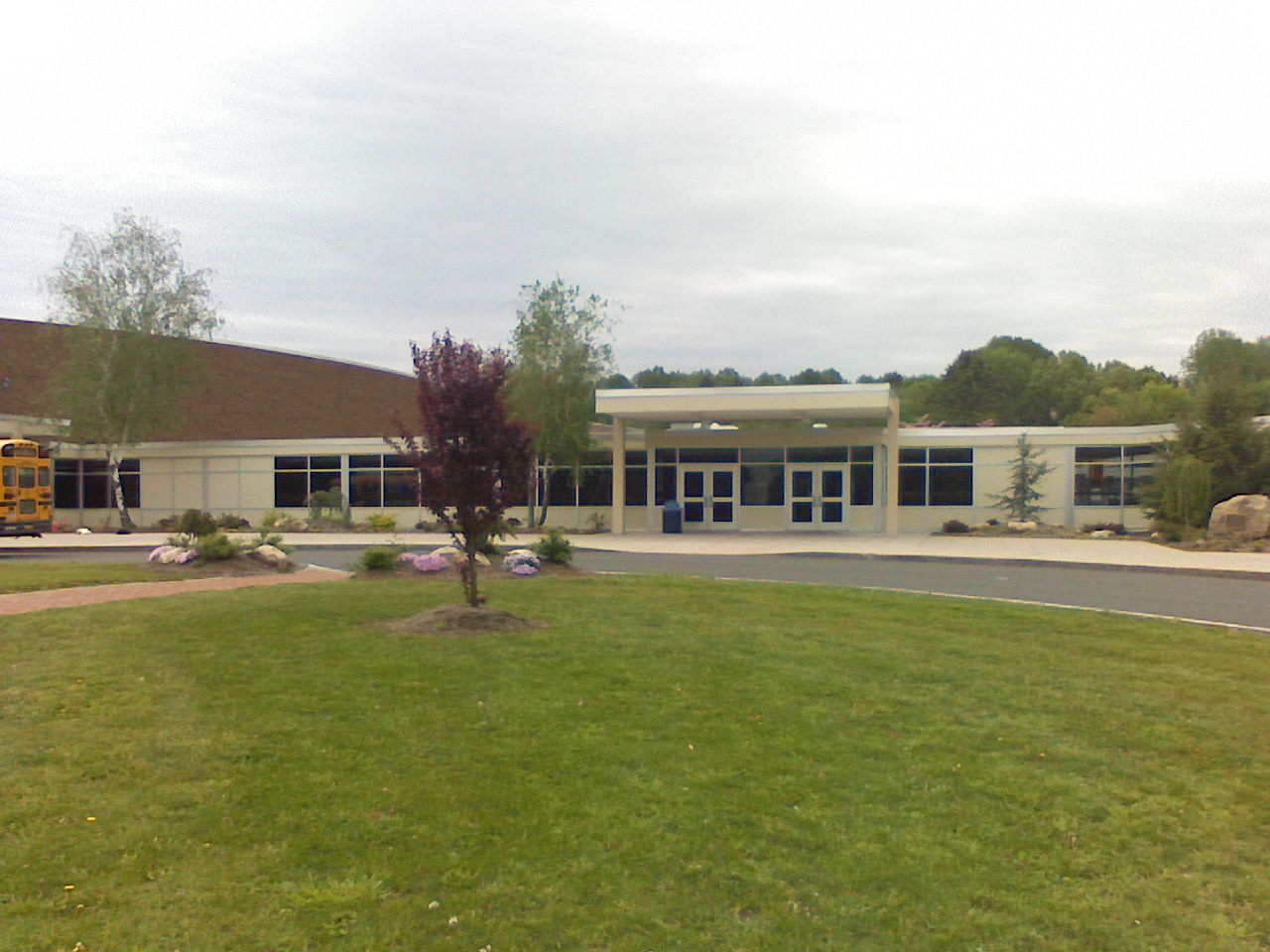

Location
- 49 Viola Road; Suffern, (Rockland County), New York 10901; United States; 41°8′3″N 74°6′35″W

Information
- School type: Public, High school
- Founded: 1904; 122 years ago
- School district: Suffern Central School District
- Principal: Paul Adler
- Teaching staff: 107.63 (FTE) (2018–19)
- Grades: 9–12
- Enrollment: 1,451 (2018–19)
- Student to teacher ratio: 13.48 (2018–19)
- Campus: Suburban
- Colors: Navy Blue; Carolina Blue; White
- Mascot: Mountain lion
- Nickname: Mountie
- Website: https://shs.sufferncentral.org/
- Last updated: July 5, 2019; 7 years ago

Suffern High School is a public high school in the Suffern Central School District (formerly known as the Ramapo Central School District) located in Suffern, New York. The school's mascot is a mountain lion (Mountie). Its yearbook is the Panorama. In 2015, Newsweek magazine ranked Suffern High in the top 500 high schools in the United States at number 439.

== Academics ==
Suffern High School offers many honors level classes, AP classes, and classes affiliated with the Syracuse University Project Advance program, the University of Cambridge, and SUNY Albany are offered as well.

== Athletics ==
Suffern High offers many sports throughout the year that take place both on and off campus; the school sports team is the Mounties. Some sports games are played at Suffern Middle School, located close to the high school. The following sports are available at Suffern (boys and girls teams are available unless noted):

- Cross country
- Football (boys)
- Soccer
- Volleyball
- Field hockey (girls)
- Cheerleading (girls)
- Swimming
- Basketball
- Bowling
- Ice hockey (boys)
- Indoor track
- Wrestling (boys)
- Gymnastics (girls)
- Skiing
- Tennis
- Track & field
- Crew
- Baseball (boys)
- Softball (girls)
- Lacrosse
- Golf

=== Hockey ===
On March 11, 2012 Suffern High School won the New York State Public High School Athletic Association (NYSPHSAA) state Hockey championship. They would win again in 2022, and reach the state finals in 2023.

In March 2024 Suffern HS Hockey team, The Mounties, became Hockey New York State NYSPHSAA Division 1 Champions. This is the Mounties second championship in three years. The Mounties are now one of eight programs in the entire New York state to win four or more state championships.

On March 16, 2025, Suffern High won the New York State NYSPHSAA Division 1 hockey championship for the 2nd year in a row and has won the championship in 3 of the last 4 years putting them into a select group of high schools in New York that have won 5 or more championships.

On March 15, 2026, Suffern High won the New York State NYSPHSAA Division 1 ice hockey championship in Buffalo NY for the third year in a row and have won it 4 of the past 5 years. This win puts Suffern in a select group of only 3 high schools (Massena & Salmon River) that have won 6 or more NYS championships.

== Notable alumni ==
- Christine Andreas (1969), Broadway performer and cabaret singer.
- Tony DeFrancesco, former MLB interim manager with the Houston Astros
- Mary Frances Gunner (1911), playwright
- Dan Gurewitch (2002), writer and comedian
- Hendrik Hertzberg – chief speechwriter for President Jimmy Carter.
- Sidney Hertzberg – New York Knicks basketball player
- Howard Hoffman (1972), broadcast performer
- Mike Lawler, U.S. Representative from New York
- Joe Lockhart – press secretary for President Bill Clinton
- Clev Lubin, American football player
- Thomas Meehan – musical writer
- Walt Weiss – Former MLB player and manager
