= New Hempstead, New York =

- Village
- Incorporated Village of New Hempstead
- Location in Rockland County and the state of New York

- Location within the state of New York
- Coordinates: 41°8′45″N 74°2′48″W
- Country: United States
- State: New York
- County: Rockland
- Town: Ramapo
- Incorporated: March 21, 1983

Government
  - Mayor: Abe Sicker
  - Deputy Mayor: Shalom Mintz
  - Trustees: Moshe Schulgasser, Shimon Levi, and Marc Schiffman

Area
  - Total: 2.85 sq mi (7.39 km^{2})
  - Land: 2.84 sq mi (7.36 km^{2})
  - Water: 0.012 sq mi (0.03 km^{2})

Population (2020)
  - Total: 5,463
  - Estimate (2025): 5,657 ▲
  - Density: 1,992/sq mi (769/km^{2})
- Time zone: UTC-5 (Eastern (EST))
  - Summer (DST): UTC-4 (EDT)
- ZIP code: 10977
- Area code: 845
- FIPS code: 36-50353
- Website: villageofnewhempstead.gov

New Hempstead is a village in the town of Ramapo, Rockland County, New York, United States. It is located north of New Square, east of Wesley Hills, south of Pomona, and west of New City. As of July 2023, the United States Census Bureau estimated the population as 5,419. Residents utilize the Spring Valley and New City post offices.

== History ==
New Hempstead was incorporated on March 21, 1983. Joseph Berger of the New York Times said in a 1997 article that New Hempstead was one of several villages formed in Ramapo by non-Jews and more secular Jews "to preserve the sparse Better Homes and Garden [sic] ambiance that attracted them to Rockland County."

== Geography ==
According to the United States Census Bureau, the village has a total area of 2.8 square miles (7.3 km^{2}), of which 2.8 square miles (7.3 km^{2}) is land and .35% is water.

New Hempstead is located roughly 14 miles (23 km) north of the Tappan Zee Bridge and roughly 30 miles (48 km) northeast of New York City.

== Demographics ==
Historical population
Census	Pop.	Note	%±
1990	4,200		—
2000	4,767		13.5%
2010	5,132		7.7%
2020	5,463		6.4%
2025 (est.)	5,657		3.6%
U.S. Decennial Census

=== 2020 census ===
As of the 2020 census, New Hempstead had a population of 5,463. The median age was 29.4 years. 33.2% of residents were under the age of 18 and 13.3% of residents were 65 years of age or older. For every 100 females there were 104.3 males, and for every 100 females age 18 and over there were 103.4 males age 18 and over.

100.0% of residents lived in urban areas, while 0.0% lived in rural areas.

There were 1,321 households in New Hempstead, of which 50.0% had children under the age of 18 living in them. Of all households, 74.1% were married-couple households, 8.9% were households with a male householder and no spouse or partner present, and 14.6% were households with a female householder and no spouse or partner present. About 10.3% of all households were made up of individuals and 5.8% had someone living alone who was 65 years of age or older.

There were 1,365 housing units, of which 3.2% were vacant. The homeowner vacancy rate was 1.0% and the rental vacancy rate was 1.6%.

Racial composition as of the 2020 census
Race	Number	Percent
White	3,877	71.0%
Black or African American	588	10.8%
American Indian and Alaska Native	30	0.5%
Asian	231	4.2%
Native Hawaiian and Other Pacific Islander	0	0.0%
Some other race	459	8.4%
Two or more races	278	5.1%
Hispanic or Latino (of any race)	658	12.0%

=== 2000 census ===
As of the census of 2000, there were 4,767 people, 1,282 households, and 1,160 families residing in the village. The population density was 1,678.8 inhabitants per square mile (648.2/km^{2}). There were 1,300 housing units at an average density of 457.8 per square mile (176.8/km^{2}). The racial makeup of the village was 69.96% white, 17.54% African American, .17% Native American, 7.26% Asian, .08% Pacific Islander, 3.06% from other races, and 1.93% from two or more races. Hispanic or Latino of any race were 9.04% of the population.

There were 1,282 households, out of which 48.6% had children under the age of 18 living with them, 81% were married couples living together, 6.6% had a female householder with no husband present, and 9.5% were non-families. 7.4% of all households were made up of individuals, and 2.9% had someone living alone who was 65 years of age or older. The average household size was 3.69 and the average family size was 3.88.

In the village, the population was spread out, with 35.7% under the age of 18, 6.2% from 18 to 24, 26.9% from 25 to 44, 23.2% from 45 to 64, and 8.0% who were 65 years of age or older. The median age was 34 years. For every 100 females, there were 99.9 males. For every 100 females age 18 and over, there were 99 males.

The median income for a household in the village was $95,472, and the median income for a family was $100,127. Males had a median income of $64,013 versus $44,028 for females. The per capita income for the village was $32,917. About 1.2% of families and 4.2% of the population were below the poverty line, including 4.3% of those under age 18 and 1.8% of those age 65 or over.

== Government ==
As of July 2021, the mayor of New Hempstead is Abe Sicker, the deputy mayor is Shalom Mintz, and the trustees are Moshe Schulgasser, Shimon Levi, and Marc Schiffman. The village is located within the East Ramapo School District.

== Landmarks and places of interest ==
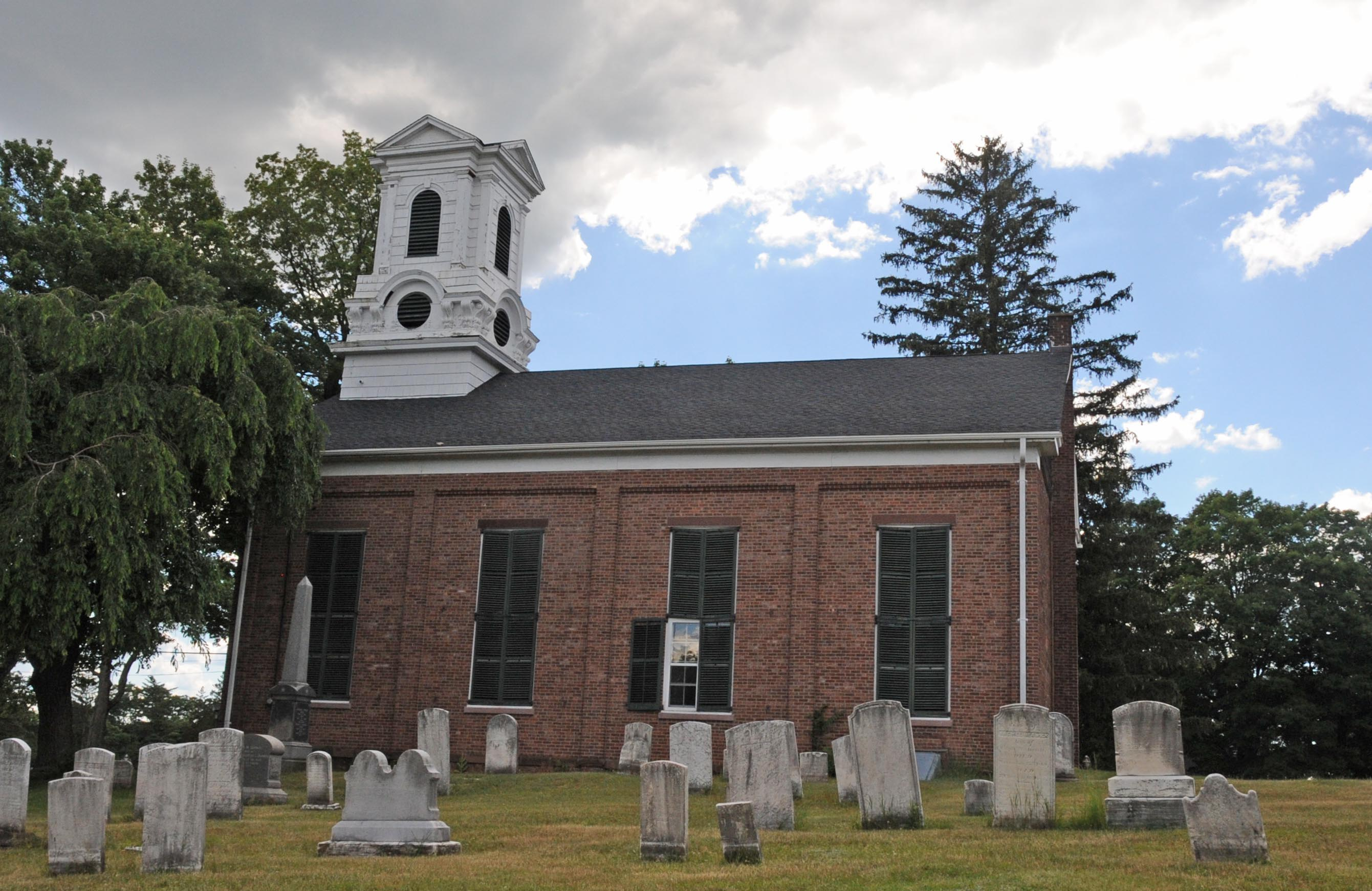
Brick Church

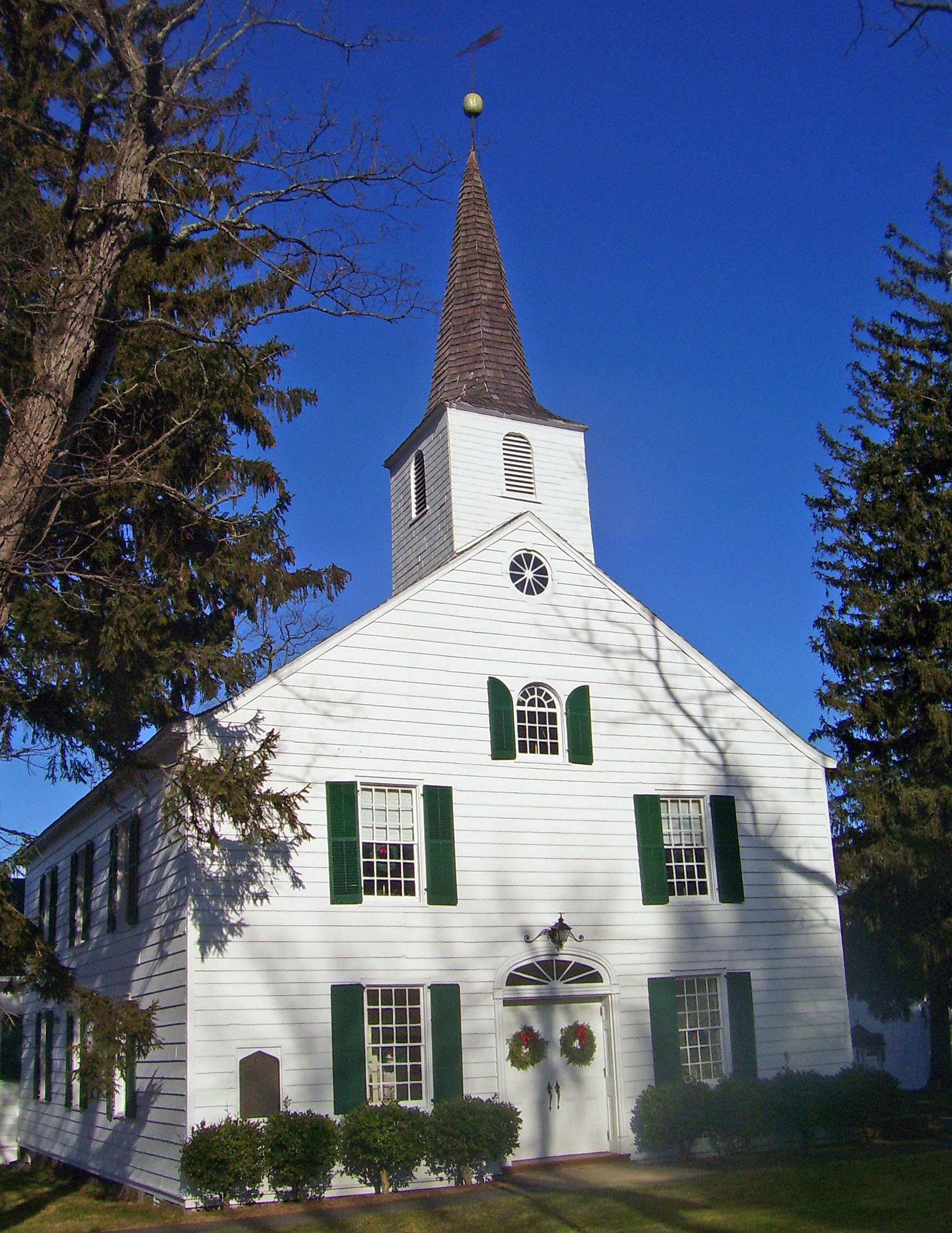
New Hempstead Presbyterian Church

- The Brick Church - 220 Brick Church Road - The church was founded by Dutch settlers in 1774 and was once known as the Reformed Church of West New Hempstead. Its present home was built in 1857 with bricks made from clay mined during the heyday of Haverstraw's brick industry. The graves of Revolutionary War soldiers and some original settlers are found in its church yard. Its cemetery building once served as the town hall for Haverstraw and later for Ramapo. Due to overcrowding in the East Ramapo school district buildings in the 1960s, the district made use of the Brick Church school. Recently the church celebrated its 150th anniversary. (NRHP)
- The English Meeting House (now the New Hempstead Presbyterian Church) - first English-speaking church west of the Hudson River in New York state.

== See also ==
- Hempstead, New York
- Hempstead (village), New York
- North Hempstead, New York
- South Hempstead, New York
- West Hempstead, New York
