= Tropper =

Tropper is a surname. Notable people with the surname include:

- A. Mary Tropper (1917–2009), British mathematician, married to Hans, mother of Anne
- Anne Tropper (born 1954), British physicist, daughter of A. Mary and Hans
- Hans Tropper (1905–1978), Austrian-British electrical engineer, married to A. Mary, father of Anne
- Hili Tropper (born 1978), Israeli educator, social worker and politician
- Jonathan Tropper (born 1970), American screenwriter, novelist, and producer
- Leib Tropper (born 1950), American Jewish educator and educational administrator
