= All-silica fiber =

Type of filament material used in telecommunications

All-silica fiber, or silica-silica fiber, is an optical fiber whose core and cladding are made of silica glass. The refractive index of the core glass is higher than that of the cladding. These fibers are typically step-index fibers. The cladding of an all-silica fiber should not be confused with the polymer overcoat of the fiber.

All-silica fiber is usually used as the medium for the purpose of transmitting optical signals. It is of technical interest in the fields of communications, broadcasting and television, due to its physical properties of low transmission loss, large bandwidth and light weight.

== Applications ==
The practical application of optical fibers in various optical networks determines the requirements for the technical performance of optical fibers. For short-distance fiber-optic transmission networks, the multi-mode optical fiber is suitable for laser transmission and wider bandwidths, so as to support larger capacity of serial signal information transmission. For long-distance submarine optical cable transmission systems, in order to reduce the number of expensive optical fiber amplifiers, it is important to consider using optical fibers with large mode field diameter area and negative dispersion to increase the transmission distance. The focus of the land-based long-distance transmission system is to be able to transmit more wavelengths, each of which should be transmitted at a high rate as much as possible. Even if the dispersion value of the optical fiber with the changes of the wavelength is minimum, the dispersion of fiber still needs to be solved. For local area networks, since the transmission distance is relatively short, the focus of consideration is on the cost of the optical network rather than the cost of transmission. In other words, it is necessary to solve the add/drop multiplexing problem of the upper/lower path in the optical fiber transmission system, and at the same time, the cost of the add/drop wavelength must be minimized.

=== Dispersion Compensating Fiber (DCF) ===
Fiber dispersion is a problem that must be avoided in communication networks, and it is also a problem that needs to be solved in long-distance transmission systems. In general, fiber dispersion includes two parts: material dispersion and waveguide structure dispersion. Material dispersion depends on the dispersion of the silica master batch and dopants used to make the fiber. Waveguide dispersion is usually the tendency effective refractive index of a mode that tends to vary with wavelength. Dispersion compensation fiber is a technology used to solve dispersion management in transmission systems.

=== Non-Dispersion Shifted Fiber (USF) ===
Non-dispersion-shifted fiber (USF) is dominated by positive material dispersion. After combining with small waveguide dispersion, it produces zero dispersion near 1310 nm. The dispersion-shifted fiber (DSF) and non-zero dispersion-shifted fiber (NZDSF) use technical means to deliberately design the refractive index profile of the fiber to produce waveguide dispersion compared with the material dispersion, so that the zero-dispersion wavelength of DSF moved to around 1550 nm after the material dispersion and the waveguide dispersion are added. The 1550 nm wavelength is the most widely used wavelength in the current communication network. In the submarine optical cable transmission system, two kinds of optical fibers with positive and negative dispersion are combined to form a transmission system for dispersion management. With the increase in the distance and capacity of the transmission system, a large number of wavelength division multiplexing (WDM) and dense wavelength division multiplexing (DWDM) systems have been put into use. In these systems, in order to perform dispersion compensation, a double-clad and triple-clad DCF with refractive index distribution that can work in the C-band and L-band has been developed.

=== Amplification Fiber ===
Amplification fibers, such as erbium-doped fiber (EDF), thulium-doped fiber (TOF), etc, can be made by doping rare earth elements, in the core layer of silica fiber. Amplifying fiber is highly integrable with traditional quartz fiber and also have many advantages such as high output, wide bandwidth, low noise and so on. Fiber amplifiers (such as EDFA) made of amplified fibers are the most widely used key components in today's transmission systems.

=== Polarization Maintaining Fiber ===
Polarization-maintaining fiber is initially developed for coherent optical transmission and later has been used in the technical fields of fiber optic sensors such as fiber optic gyroscopes. In recent years, due to the increase in the number of wavelength division multiplexing in the DWDM transmission system and the development of high speed, the polarization maintaining fiber has been more widely used. Currently, the most widely used fiber is Panda Optical Fiber (PANDA). PANDA fiber is currently used as pigtails connected with other fiber optic devices and used in the system as a whole.

Single-mode non-stripping optical fiber(SM-NSF) is a new type of optical fiber that still has the NSP polyester layer remaining on the surface of the fiber cladding even after removing the fiber cladding to protect the mechanical properties and high reliability of the optical fiber. SM-NSP fiber and conventional SM fiber have the same outer diameter, eccentricity, and degree of accuracy. It can be widely used in the optical fiber of the transmission system and is an ideal new-type distribution optical fiber.

=== Optical Fiber for Deep Ultraviolet (DUV) Light Transmission ===
One of the current research topics of solid-state lasers and gas lasers is laser oscillation technology in the deep ultraviolet field (250 nm). Deep ultraviolet light has been extremely widely used in the surface treatment of semiconductor substrates, DNA analysis and testing in the biochemistry field, and the treatment of myopia in the medical field.

== See also ==
- Hard-clad silica optical fiber
- Plastic-clad silica fiber
- Plastic optical fiber
- Silica fiber
