= Monsey Church =

The Monsey Church
- New Hope Christian Church
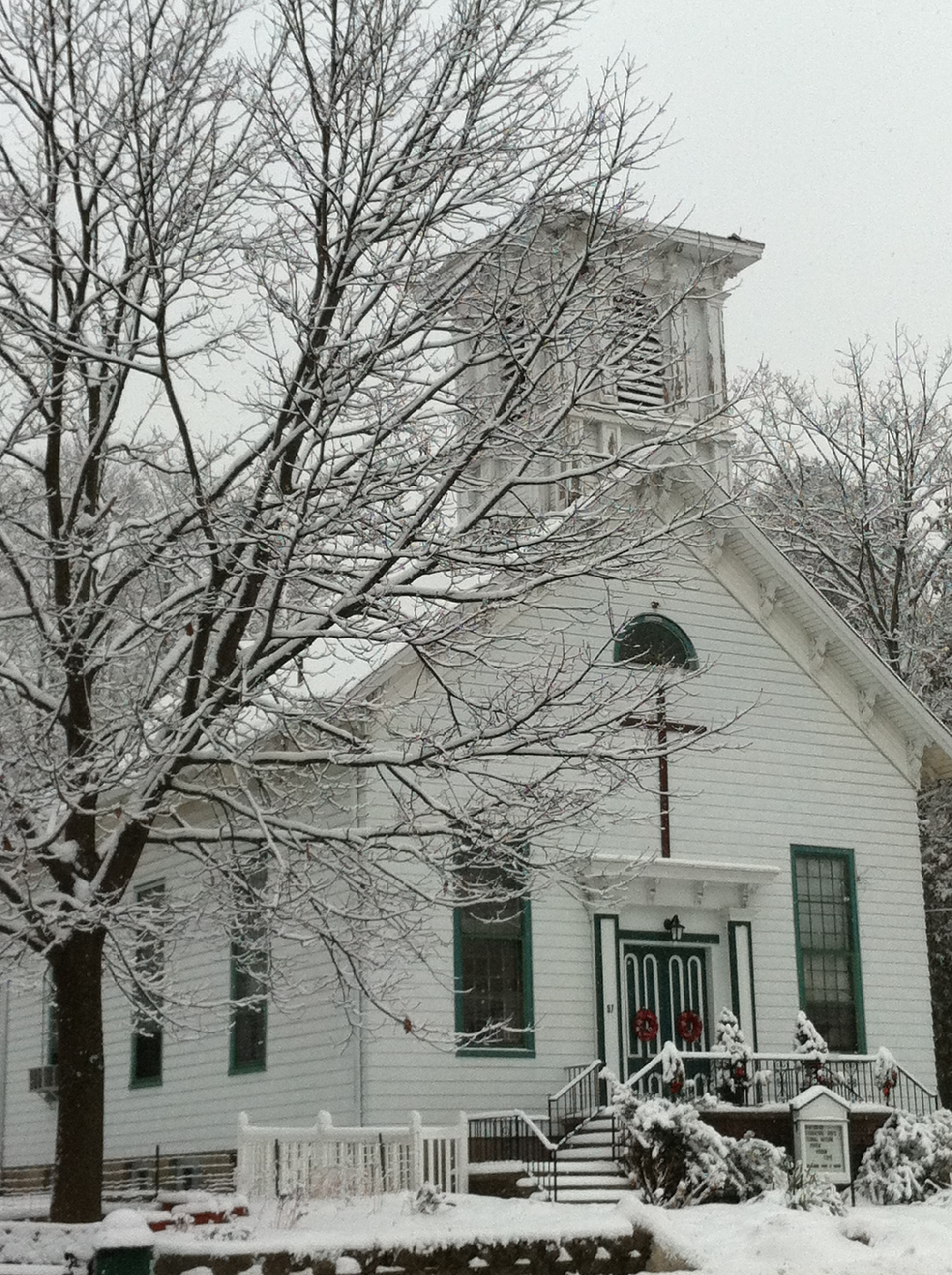
- New Hope Christian Church ("The Monsey Church") in 2011

- The Monsey Church is in southern Rockland County in downstate New York, about 25 miles from Manhattan
- 41.112168°N 74.069232°W
- Location: Monsey, New York
- Country: United States
- Denomination: Presbyterian Church in America
- Previous denomination: True Reformed Dutch Church (1824–1890; 1908–1925); Christian Reformed Church (1890–1908; 1925–2005)
- Churchmanship: Evangelical
- Website: www.newhoperockland.com

History
- Former name(s): Monsey Christian Reformed Church; True Reformed Dutch Church of West New Hempstead "The Seceder church"
- Status: Church
- Founded: June 11, 1824
- Founder: The Rev. James D. Demarest
- Dedicated: August 29, 1869; Rededicated July 31, 1953
- Events: Reorganized September 26, 1952; Adopted name New Hope Christian Church December 6, 2000; Joined Presbyterian Church in America in 2007

Architecture
- Functional status: Active
- Style: Greek Revival with elements of Italianate

Clergy
- Pastor: Vacant

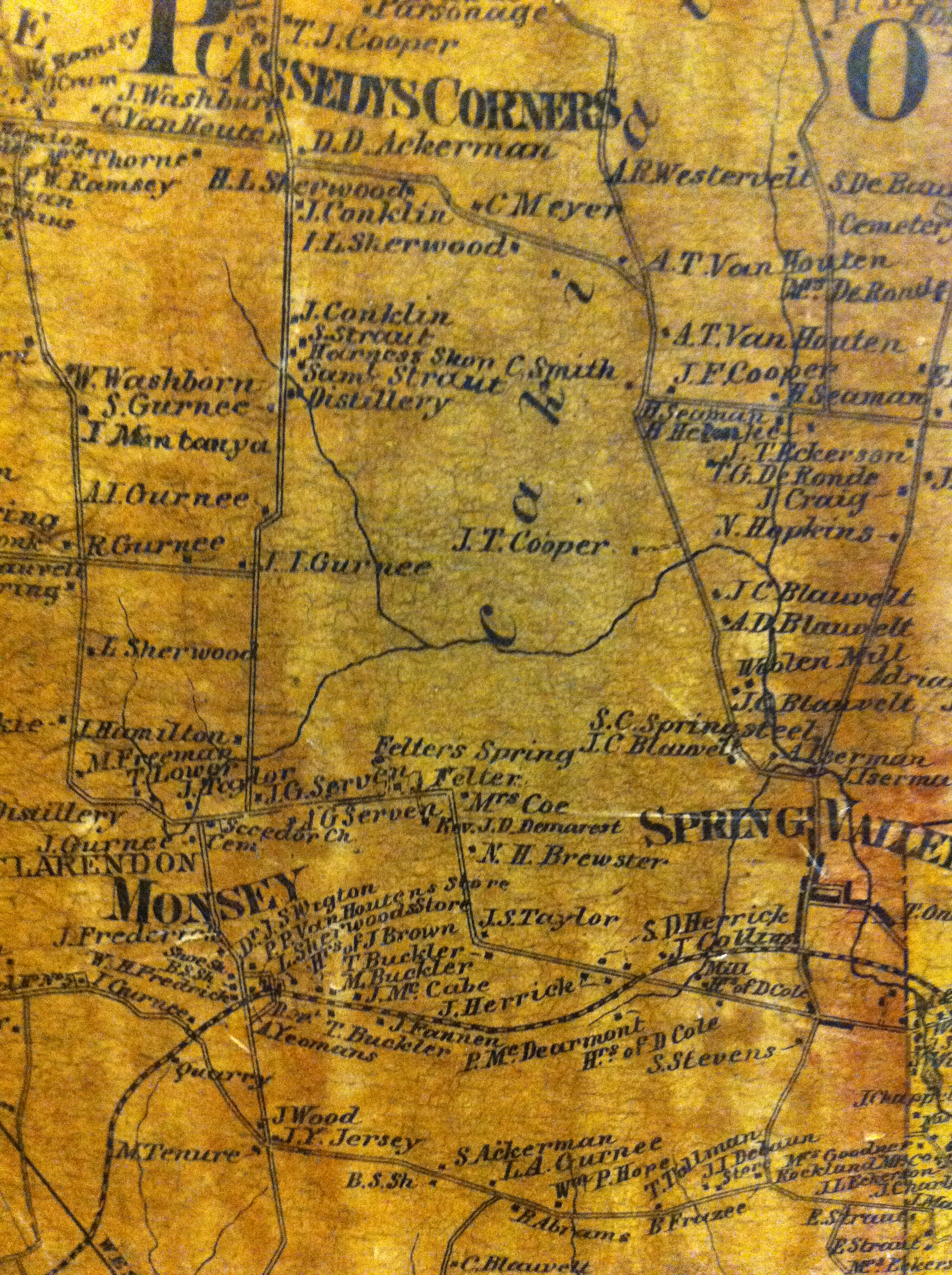
The original location of the Monsey Church (labeled "Seceder church") and cemetery, as well as the residence of the Rev. James D. Demarest and other important people in the early years of the church can be seen in this image from an 1859 map of Orange and Rockland Counties.

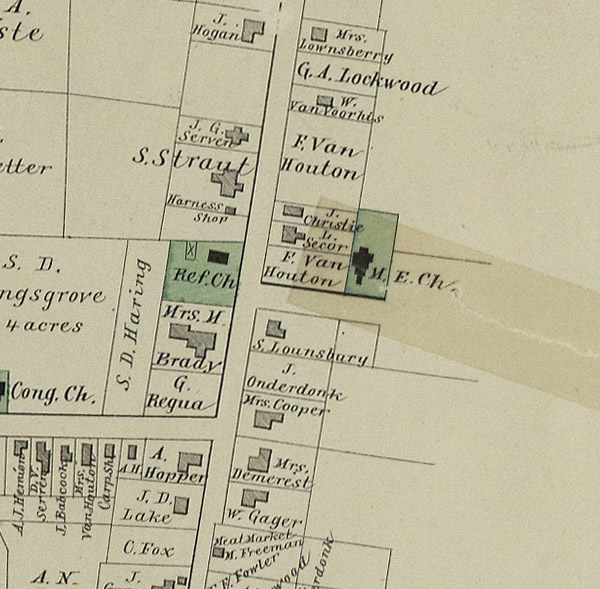
The "Centennial" (1876) map of Monsey, showing the location of the Monsey Church on Main Street and the Methodist church on Secor St. (site of the Monsey Church's parsonage today). The Congregational church is partly visible on the left on the site of Haring's Grove. (Image courtesy of the Palisades Free Library, Palisades, NY)

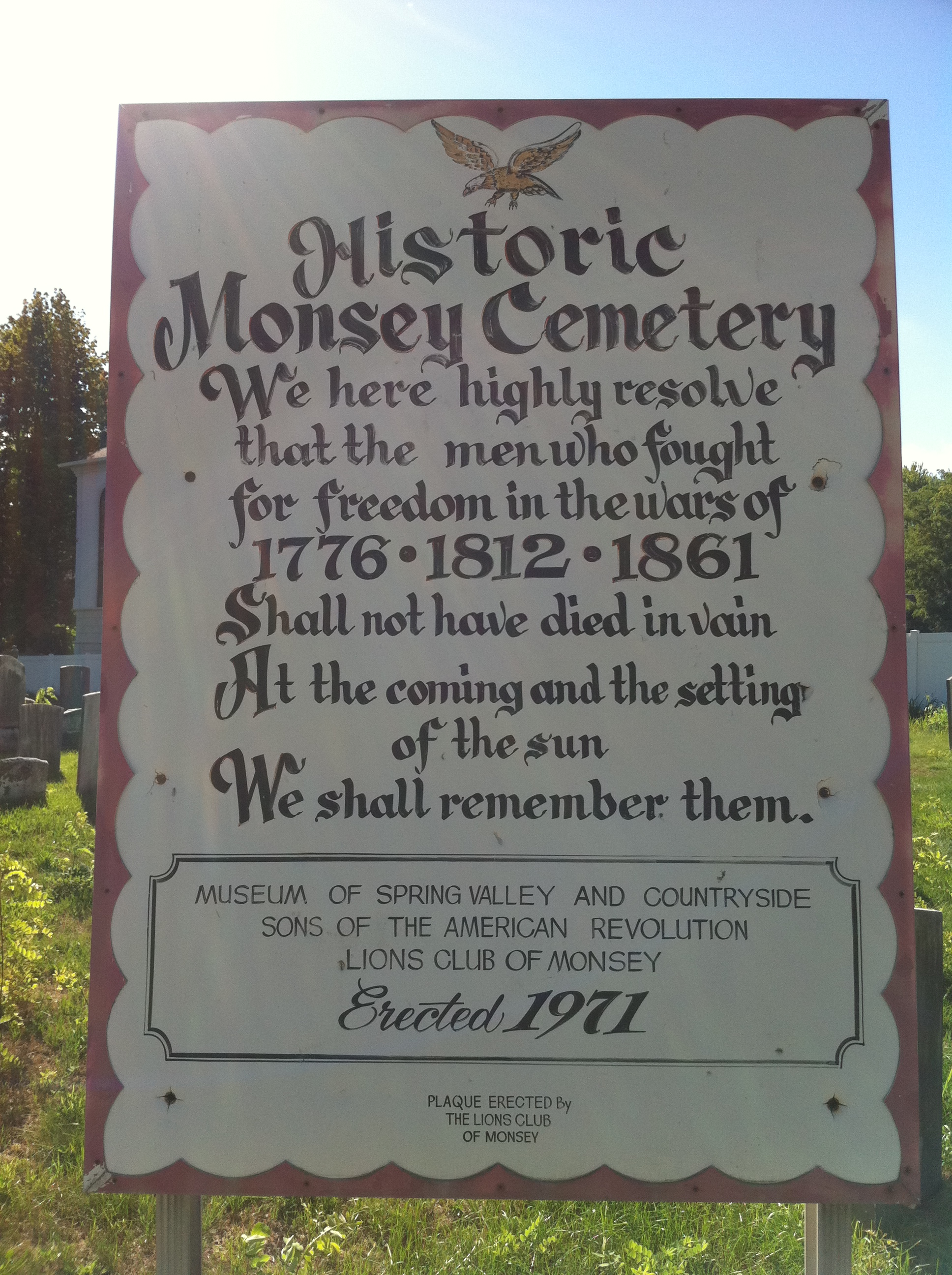
Sign at the Historic Monsey Cemetery that belongs to the Monsey Church.

The Monsey Church is the colloquial name of a historic Reformed Christian church in the hamlet of Monsey, town of Ramapo, in southern Rockland County, New York, the official name of which, since December 6, 2000, is New Hope Christian Church. The church was founded in 1824 as the True Reformed Dutch Church of West New Hempstead and later became known as the Monsey Christian Reformed Church. The church owns a historic cemetery adjacent to the site of its first meeting house and briefly operated a private Christian school in the 1950s and '60s. Today the church is a member congregation of the Presbyterian Church in America (PCA). It is the only remaining church that was once part of the True Reformed Dutch Church.

== History ==
=== Origin and early years (1824–1890) ===
The Monsey Church was formed out of a split within the Dutch Reformed Church in America. Although earlier events also contributed to the split, the publication of Conrad Ten Eyck's book Selections on the Atonement in 1818 was the chief cause. In it, Ten Eyck advocated a doctrine of unlimited atonement—contrary to the Canons of Dort, one of the Dutch Reformed Church's doctrinal standards. Asked to defend himself before the Classis of Montgomery meeting at Owasco, New York, in 1819, he affirmed that he believed and preached a doctrine of the unlimited atonement of death of Jesus Christ on the cross. Notwithstanding that admission, Classis Montgomery failed to contradict or discipline Ten Eyck, whereupon the matter was appealed to the higher court of the church, the General Synod.

By 1822, the General Synod had failed to act decisively in the case of Ten Eyck and Classis Montgomery. As a result, Solomon Froeligh of the Dutch Reformed Church of Hackensack-Schraalenburgh, New Jersey (Classis Paramus), became convinced that the toleration of heretical doctrine, a lack of church discipline at all levels, and widespread profanation of the sacraments put the denomination beyond possibility of reform. In his view, all the marks of a true church had been erased. Accordingly, in meetings on October 22–24, 1822, Froeligh began a movement of secession from the Dutch Reformed Church in America that resulted in the establishment of the True Reformed Dutch Church (sometimes called the True Reformed Protestant Dutch Church).

At that time, two Dutch Reformed congregations, one in West New Hempstead, New York (known informally as the Brick Church), and one in Ramapo, New Jersey, were united as a single church with James D. Demarest as their pastor as of September 21, 1809. Demarest joined the secession movement, and on June 11, 1824, he led 68 members of the two congregations, including two elders, out of the Dutch Reformed Church. The people who seceded from the Brick Church established a new independent congregation in Monsey and were therefore called the Seceder church. Its first elders were Garret Serven (Sarven), Joseph Iserman, Teunis VanHouten, and Peter C. VanHouten, and its deacons were Peter Serven (Sarven), Stephen VanOrden, and Cornelius Springsteen. One of the members was Jacob Felter, a veteran of the War of 1812 buried in the Historic Monsey Cemetery. On April 26, 1825, the Monsey Church petitioned Classis Hackensack of the newly formed True Reformed Dutch Church to receive them into care, and this was granted. The Monsey Church was established as the True Reformed Dutch Church of West New Hempstead. Worship was held in a building at the corner of Maple Avenue and Saddle River Road, adjacent to the Historic Monsey Cemetery, and a surviving church record book dated September 8, 1827, records the sale of pews to the officers and members of the church.

Demarest continued as pastor of both the Monsey Church and the Ramapo church for many years. With many more churches than trained pastors, pastors commonly oversaw multiple congregations, rotating among them on successive Sundays. One of the deacons at Monsey toward the end of Demarest's pastorate was John Yeury de Baun, born in Monsey in 1827. In 1852, when de Baun was 25 years old, he was accepted by Classis Hackensack as a student in theology, under the tutelage of Demarest and Abram Van Houten. From 1852 to 1855, Van Houten took over the pastorate of Monsey from Demarest. De Baun completed his studies in theology in 1855 and was called to be the pastor of both the Ramapo and the Monsey churches. De Baun preached alternate Sundays at Ramapo and Monsey until 1860, when he accepted a call to pastor the churches in Hackensack and English Neighborhood, New Jersey.

Shortly after being organized in 1824, land near the present-day Historic Monsey Cemetery was donated to the new church, and work began on a building. They continued to meet in that location until 1869, after a new building had been constructed on land that had been donated on Main Street. That building, still used by the church today, was dedicated on August 29, 1869.

Officers and members of the Monsey Church in April, 1825
Last	First	Office	Buried in Monsey Cemetery?
Sarven	Garret	Elder	X
Iserman	Jacob	Elder	
Van Houten	Teunis	Elder	X
Van Houten	Peter O.	Elder	? (= Peter C. VanHouten?)
Sarven	Peter	Deacon	X
Van Orden	Stephen	Deacon	X
Springsteen	Cornelius	Deacon	X
Van Houten	Claus T.	Member	X
Onderdonk	Cornelius	Member	X
Youry	William	Member	? (= William H. Yeury?)
Youry	Susannah	Member	
Van Houten	Catharine	Member	X
Myer	Anny	Member	
Van Orden	John	Member	X
Van Orden	Elizabeth	Member	X
Onderdonk	Garret T.	Member	
Myers	Carline	Member	
Barbarow	Catharine	Member	
Onderdonk	Jane	Member	
Van Houten	Jane	Member	X
Iserman	Mary	Member	? (= Maria Iserman?)
Cole	Elizabeth	Member	
Cooper	John	Member	
Servan	Charity	Member	X
Youry	Charity	Member	X
Crum	Martha	Member	
Onderdonk	Anny	Member	? (= Anna Onderdonk)
Onderdonk	Elizabeth	Member	? (= Elizabeth Youry)
Van Houten	Peter P.	Member	X
Van Orden	Peter J.	Member	X
VanHouten	Abraham P.	Member	
Youry	Elizabeth	Member	? (Elizabeth Youry in cemetery could be married name of Elizabeth Onderdonk)
Servan	Abraham	Member	
Iserman	Henry	Member	X
Blauvelt	Jane	Member	
Servan	Hannah	Member	? (= Hannah Sarvent?)
Blauvelt	Cornels. J.	Member	
Servan	Jacob	Member	X
VanHouten	Elizabeth	Member	X
Van Orden	Elizabeth	Member	X
Van Houten	Winy	Member	? (= Wyntje VanHouten?)
Servan	Margaret	Member	
Demarest	Elizabeth	Member	X
Onderdonk	Thomas	Member	X
Onderdonk	Margaret	Member	X
Bartholf	William	Member	
Bartholf	Leah	Member	
Onderdonk	Isaac	Member	
Myers	John	Member	
Van Houten	Peter R.	Member	X
Sarven	Abm. G.	Member	
Sarven	Rchel	Member	
Johnson	John A.	Member	X
Johnson	Sally	Member	X
Haring	N. L.	Member	
Smith	Anna	Member	
Haring	Mary	Member	X

=== Merger with and withdrawal from the Christian Reformed Church (1890–1908) ===
Although the churches of the True Reformed Dutch Church, including the Monsey Church, were mostly made up of families of Dutch heritage, English was the primary language used in the churches. In 1860, the first movement toward union with the Christian Reformed Church came in the form of correspondence to the True Reformed Dutch Church by a group called the True Reformed Holland Church in the West, in Grand Rapids, Michigan. Ministers from both denominations met several times and found themselves to be in agreement in doctrine and practice. Nevertheless, because the Hollanders were by and large a Dutch-speaking group, whereas Classis Hackensack of the True Reformed Dutch Church were primarily English speakers, the decision was made in 1873 not to unite but simply to support and serve each other any way needed.

Beginning in 1880, conditions began to change that led to the merger of the True Reformed Dutch Church with the Christian Reformed Church ten years later. In 1880, the True Reformed Dutch Church (Classis Hackensack) learned that the Holland group had changed their name to the Holland Christian Reformed Church, partly to associate themselves more closely with the Christian Reformed Churches of their native Holland. The Holland Christian Reformed Church had also formed their own classis in the east, Classis Hudson, and the denomination had begun to use the English language. Classis Hudson was asked to confer with Classis Hackensack about the possibility of organic union between the two denominations. On April 15, 1890, Classis Hacksensack voted to unite organically with the Holland Christian Reformed Church, requesting that the name of the new denomination be changed simply to the Christian Reformed Church. The Monsey Church was represented at this meeting, however it was then without a pastor, as John R. Cooper had been given up his pastorate of the churches of Monsey and Nanuet due to illness and died not much later in 1886. The True Reformed Dutch Church, the Monsey Church included, was now part of the Christian Reformed Church.

Around the turn of the century, a series of disputes about Freemasonry and membership in other secret societies arose within Classis Hackensack. The first incident was in 1898, when a delegate to the Classis from the Ridgewood, New Jersey church was accused of being a Freemason, contrary to the rules of church government. The man neither affirmed nor denied his membership in Masonry, but he also refused to renounce it. He then withdrew himself as a delegate. His alternate was put forward, but it became clear that he was a member of the Odd Fellows, and the Classis did not seat him. This resulted in the Ridgewood church's withdrawal from the Christian Reformed Church early in 1899.

A similar case involved Charles N. Van Houten, son of the Monsey Church's second pastor, Abraham (Abram) Van Houten. The younger Van Houten had been the pastor of a Presbyterian church for some 20 years, but around 1905 was called by the church in Schraalenberg, New Jersey, to be its pastor due to the old age and infirmity of Garret A. Haring, who had been ministering there. Charles Van Houten was a Freemason, and agreed to withdraw from the organization, in submission to the rules, if he joined with Classis Hackensack. He accepted the call, was received by the Classis, and withdrew from Freemasonry. But Classis Hudson learned of this decision and was not satisfied. The Stated Clerk sent Classis Hackensack a letter informing them that they would protest Van Houten's admission and would not recognize him as a minister of the gospel.

Early in 1908, a resolution was put before Classis Hackensack to withdraw from the Christian Reformed Church since rules about "minor secret organizations" and other matters had caused so much agitation in the churches and in meetings of the Classis, and conflict between Classis Hudson and itself. On June 2, 1908, after referral to the churches, the decision was ratified to withdraw from the Christian Reformed Church. The Monsey Church, through its pastor John Calvin Voorhis, cast a vote to withdraw. The Monsey Church was once again part of the True Reformed Dutch Church, newly reconstituted.

The newly independent Classis Hackensack quickly passed a resolution to deal with the trouble that had arisen in 1899–1908: "Resolved that in the future we eliminate the inquiry respecting all secret societies according to Art. 32 of our confession." Voorhis, who had just been released from his pastorate at Monsey and been named counselor instead, opposed this resolution and had his name recorded in the minutes as opposed to it.

=== Season of decline (1909–1925) ===
In Classis Hackensack, there were now far fewer pastors than there were churches needing their ministry. After John Calvin Voorhis was released from his pastorate in Monsey, the Monsey Church found that it could not expect regular pulpit supply. The church continued to meet during the summer months, relying on seminary students to fill the pulpit, but began to close during the winter. Peter Steen was one such student, who spent the summer of 1920 ministering in Monsey.

A number of churches in the Classis either closed or withdrew, and those that remained were weak and struggling. By 1921, the Monsey Church had only six active members, in spite of the fact that a Sunday school had been started in 1920. The members voted at a congregational meeting held on May 3, 1921 to deed the church property to Classis Hackensack, and that was accomplished in a quit-claim deed dated July 20, 1921, executed by Crine Hook, "as sole surviving elder and trustee of the True Reformed Dutch Church of West New Hempstead." Classis Hackensack of the True Reformed Dutch Church now consisted of only three churches (the Monsey Church; Leonia, New Jersey; and New york City) and two ministers (John Calvin Voorhis and Samuel Vanderbeek). Then, on Monday morning, October 23, 1922, John Calvin Voorhis died. The day before he had preached at the Monsey Church a sermon on John 10:28–29. Only Samuel Vanderbeek, who was old and ill, remained to care for these three churches. He died on August 11, 1924.

=== Renewal in the Christian Reformed Church (1925–2005) ===
What few people remained in the churches of Classis Hackensack in 1924 voted to dissolve and affiliate with the Christian Reformed Church. That occurred on February 19, 1925 and opened the door to new opportunities for ministry in and around Monsey. In 1925 John Beebe, a ministerial candidate, accepted the call to become Home Missionary in the East, working in Monsey. Sunday services were held at the Monsey Church nearly every week. A group for the women in the church, called The Martha Circle, was organized on March 12, 1926, with Mrs. Beebe as president. The women in the Circle worked to raise money for various charitable causes. For example, on December 4, 1926, a "food and fancy article sale" was held that raised $140.50 to help paint the church. At the May 18, 1927 meeting, the members voted to give $25 to help relieve suffering from the Great Mississippi Flood of 1927, one of the greatest natural disasters the country had yet experienced.

Meindert Botbyl succeeded Beebe in 1928 and resided in Monsey until his death in 1940. After Botbyl's pastorate, little attention was given to Monsey. Harold Dekker, who was later called to pastor the Christian Reformed Church of Englewood, ministered in Monsey during the summer of 1940 while still a seminary student. A single weekly preaching service was supplied, but no full-time effort was expended until 1948, when the Eastern Home Missionary Board of the Christian Reformed Church decided to place seminarian Dick L. Van Halsema in Monsey for a trial period of 12 weeks. The summer of 1948, when Van Halsema was in Monsey, marked the beginning of the congregation's revival. Van Halsema's efforts were greatly assisted by Dekker, now installed as pastor in Englewood. In May, 1949, it was reported that there were 20 communicant and four baptized members of the Monsey Church. By May 6, 1950, there were enough people at the Monsey Church for the "young people of the Christian Reformed Chapel, Monsey, N.Y." to travel to Englewood, New Jersey, to serve the 75th anniversary banquet meal.

In 1949, Van Halsema was ordained and installed at Monsey as Home Missionary for the East. A new parsonage was erected by the people in 1950, and on September 26, 1952, the Monsey Christian Reformed Church was reorganized, having grown from one member in 1948 to fourteen families. Van Halsema was installed as pastor of the reorganized church on April 1, 1954, and remained in Monsey until July 23, 1956, when he departed to accept a call to organize a church in Miami, Florida.

The Monsey Church grew rapidly, along with Rockland County itself, in the 1950s. The church was home to a large private Christian school and had a thriving Sunday school program and morning and evening Sunday services. With the opening of the New York State Thruway and the Tappan Zee Bridge in the mid-1950s, Rockland County grew rapidly—and the Monsey Church with it. Beginning in the 1970s the county's growth began to slow. Along with a rising trend in the cost of living, an increasing number of Orthodox and Hasidic Jews settled in Monsey and the immediate area. The result of this demographic change is that an extraordinary number of non-Jewish families have moved out of the area. Present-day Monsey, like nearby Kaser and New Square (and Kiryas Joel in Orange County) can be considered a modern-day suburban shtetl.

=== Monsey Church today (2005–present) ===
In 2000, Monsey Church changed its name from Monsey Christian Reformed Church to New Hope Christian Church. In 2004, the congregation voted to withdraw again from the Christian Reformed Church. In a letter dated March 22, 2005, from the Stated Clerk of Classis Hudson of the Christian Reformed Church, the congregation was informed that the Classis approved a motion to "acquiesce in the decision of the New Hope CRC of Monsey, NY to disaffiliate itself with the Christian Reformed Church in North America." After a few years as an independent congregation, the church was received into the Metropolitan New York Presbytery of the Presbyterian Church in America in 2007.

The church continues to meet in its 1869 building at 57 Main Street, on New York State Route 306, in Monsey, about 1/4 mile north of Route 59. Christian worship is open to the public and begins at 11 on Sunday mornings.

== Pastors and ministers ==
Portrait	Name	Years active and notes
Ministers Associated with the 1822–24 Secession and the True Reformed Dutch Church (Classis Hackensack)
	James D. Demarest	1825–1852: First pastor of the True Reformed Dutch Church of Monsey; Several of Demarest's sermons were printed in The Banner of Truth in the 1860s and '70s; As can be seen on the 1859 map of Orange and Rockland Counties (see sidebar), Demarest's home was at the corner of what is today Monsey Boulevard and Maple Avenue. He is buried in the Historic Monsey Cemetery.
	Abraham (Abram) Van Houten	June 6, 1852–1855
	John Yeury de Baun	November 11, 1855–1860: Founder and editor of The Banner of Truth magazine of the True Reformed Dutch Church ca. 1865
	John R. Cooper	1865–March 18, 1886: The earliest report available about the size of the Monsey Church is from April 18, 1882, in a report to Classis Hackensack: a total of 32 members. By 1885, the number had increased to 43. Nevertheless, according to the Consistory minutes for March 15, 1886, a congregational meeting was attended by only 13 members.
	Grompin	1890: The Rev. Grompin appears as "pastor" in the consistory's minutes for June 23, 1890. It seems that he was a supply pastor, as he presided over a congregational meeting on September 20, 1890, at which the congregation voted not to call a pastor. The next entry in the minutes is from May 1891, and they make no mention of Grompin then or anytime thereafter.
	Cornelius D. De Mott	August 26, 1891–October 12, 1892: First pastor after merger to form the Christian Reformed Church; In April, 1892 the Monsey Church reported having 25 members.
	James Van Houten	1893: Mr. Van Houten was a candidate who served at the church for six months.
	John A. Westervelt	Summer 1895: The Rev. Westervelt served in Monsey during the summer of 1895 while on vacation from theological training at Princeton Theological Seminary.
	L. Colyn	May 12, 1896–November 12, 1896: Colyn was a seminary student who preached as stated supply in Monsey for six months.
	William D. Vander Werp	November 23, 1897–1899: In 1899, when Vander Werp was going to leave Monsey to accept a call elsewhere, 41 members of the church signed a petition appealing to God that he would stay with them instead.; "Reasons for dying out of the Monsey congregation were the young people going to business college in New York and securing positions there, and settling closer to New York." (Letter from William D. Vander Werp to Dick L. Van Halsema of February 16, 1950)
	Klaas Poppen	July 1902–August 1904: In 1903, there were 29 members of the Monsey Church.; During Klassen's pastorate, by permission of Classis Hackensack, the practice of elders choosing their own successors was discontinued in favor of election by a majority of the members.
	John Calvin Voorhis	1906–1909
Ministers during the Period of Renewal in the Christian Reformed Church (CRCNA)
	John Cornelius De Korne	June 1915–August 1915: John C. De Korne, who went on to serve as a missionary in China and director of the Christian Reformed Church's overseas missions, served in Monsey while still a seminary student.; "They were lovely folks, anything they had in their gardens was shared with us but they lacked church enthusiasm. So many were lodge members and knew very little of sabbath observance. It was not an easy place to serve for a man in his first summer of preaching." (Letter from De Korne's widow, Nettie G. De Korne, to Dick L. Van Halsema, dated September 12, 1955
	Peter Lambert Steen	1920: A seminary student who worked in Monsey in summer 1920; "The present oldest member of the congregation in 1955 tells an amusing incident about Mr. Steen. According to Mrs. [Phebe] Swan, who often entertained visiting preachers in those days, Peter Steen went into the long-unused Chapel to give it a thorough cleaning. With a boy's cart he took the kerosene-burning lamps over to Mrs. Swan's home on Main Street, north of former Henken store, and there scrubbed the lamps clean. After they were re-hung, Mr. Steen returned to Mrs. Swan's home and, at her insistence, submitted to a thorough scrubbing of head, neck, and back attended to personally by 'Aunt Phebe'!"
	John Beebe	October 25, 1925–1928: Served as Home Missionary in the East, concentrating on the work in Monsey; Beebe's inaugural sermon on Matthew 10:32 was preached before a congregation of 7 people. Average attendance eventually increased to about 25.; Mrs. Beebe organized a ladies' aid society called "the Martha Circle" in 1926.; "Funeral services and marriages performed in the church usually were well attended. On one occasion we recall the auditorium was filled to the doors when Mr. LeRoy Conklin and Miss Stella C. Wagoner were united in marriage on April 4, 1926. The room was beautifully decorated and before the lectern stood a large arch and kneeling bench. ... Concerning our labors as Home Missionary in the East ... we concentrated our main efforts in Monsey in order to revive the cause of the Lord which to all appearances was fast dying out. ... We shall never forget Monsey. It was the place of our first love. The people were kind to us and showed it too by the many tokens of friendship. What bothered us mostly was the general indifference to things spiritual. The forces of evil with which the church coped were the Masonic lodge, the commercial movie, and general spirit of worldliness. Many were satisfied with a social Gospel as we understand the term in our circles. But to seek first the kingdom of God and His righteousness—that was not the lofty aim of most of them." (Letter from John Beebe to Dick L. Van Halsema)
	Meindert Botbyl	1928–1940: Served as Home Missionary in the East, concentrating on the Monsey Church from 1928 until his death in 1940.; "The people of Monsey for the greater part were not in the habit of attending church regularly and much mission work was needed here. The Mission Board of the Christian Reformed Church many times suggested to Rev. Botbyl that Monsey be closed for lack of interest and support for the church. Many were the times when just a handful of people were present at the services ..." (Letter from Botbyl's son John Botbyl to Dick L. Van Halsema, 1955.)
	Elbert Kooistra	1941–1944: Kooistra was the Home Missionary for the East during these years, though he did not reside in Monsey.
	Harold Dekker	1940, 1949: Worked in Monsey as a seminary student assisting Kooistra in summer 1941. The attendance was "never over 12, and sometimes much less."; In 1948, there were 20 members, and average attendance of about 35. A special candlelight service on Sunday evening, December 26, drew an attendance of 140.; Returned in 1949 when pastor of the Englewood Christian Reformed Church to assist Van Halsema
	Dick Lucas Van Halsema	1948–July 23, 1956: First worked in Monsey as a seminary student from June 1948 to August 1948; Ordained and installed as home missionary in September 23, 1949; Installed as pastor in 1954; At the time of reorganization in September 1952, the Monsey Church had 69 members (adult and baptized children). By 1954, there were 108 members (65 communicant, 53 baptized).; In September, 1953, the church opened Rockland County Christian School with 14 pupils, one full-time teacher, and one part-time teacher.; In September, 1954, the Young Married Women's Guild, later known as the Ruth Circle, was formed: a new society was formed when a growing number of younger women with small children found it difficult to attend the afternoon Martha Circle meetings. The group later became known as the Young Married Women's Guild, and since that time it has met at members' homes once a month, except during the summer.
	Edson "Bill" Taft Lewis, Jr.	September 20, 1956–September 1964: At a congregational meeting on November 2, 1956, women members of the church were given the right to vote in church business.; Rockland County Christian School ceased to operate after June 1960.; Order of Service for Mr. Lewis' ordination
	Calvin Dale Vander Meyden	September 25, 1966–October 1969: Order of Service for Mr. Vander Meyden's ordination
	Robert Walter, Jr.	October 18, 1970–February 1975: Order of Service for Mr. Walter's ordination
	Leonard Peter Troast	October 12, 1975–1978: Order of Service for Mr. Troast's ordination
	Mark John Lucas	February 1, 1981–1985: Order of Service for Mr. Lucas' ordination
	Jan Karel Boersma	September 25, 1983–Unknown: Boersma served as Associate Minister of the church for an unknown period in the early 1980s, the only associate pastor in the congregation's history. According to the Order of Service for his installation, his primary ministry was as a teacher and counselor at the Sing Sing Correctional Facility in the town and village of Ossining, New York.
Ministers during the Period of Transition out of the Christian Reformed Church
	Robert DiMaggio	1987–September 1988
	Gordon Stuart Miller	1991–1993
	Donald M. Parker	1997–1999
	J. Timothy Elliott	2000–2004: Elliott is a Presbyterian (PCA) minister who served as stated supply at the Monsey Church; First minister under the name New Hope Christian Church
	Tom Riello	2004–2005
Ministers of the Presbyterian Church in America (PCA)
	Paul Kalfa	2008–2009: First pastor in the Presbyterian Church in America
Phillip W. Dennis II	Phillip Wayne Dennis II	June 2, 2012–December 25, 2016: Dennis came to the Monsey Church as a regular supply preacher in August 2010. He was ordained and installed as the pastor of the church on June 2, 2012.; Order of Service for Mr. Dennis' ordination and installation

== The Historic Monsey Cemetery ==
The Historic Monsey Cemetery (also called Monsey Memorial Cemetery, Seceder Cemetery, or Monsey Rural Cemetery) is located at the corner of Maple Avenue and N. Saddle River Road. The cemetery belongs to the Monsey Church. It sits adjacent to the site of the original True Reformed Dutch Church building that had been donated by Judge Garret Serven, one of the elders of the Brick Church who seceded with James Demarest to form the True Reformed Dutch Church of Monsey. In 1869, the church moved to their present building on Main Street. The original building next to the cemetery was moved to Grove Street and began to be used by the Congregational church.

A database of people buried in the Historic Monsey Cemetery is available from the Genealogical Society of Rockland County. Many early members of the church are buried there, including Demarest. Veterans of the Revolutionary War, the War of 1812, and the Civil War are all buried in the cemetery (see table below).

Israel Saffer of the Museum of Spring Valley and Countryside worked vigorously in the 1960s to enlist help from the government and community groups to maintain the cemetery. The cemetery is maintained by community groups such as the Monsey Lions Club and the Stony Point Battle chapter of the Sons of the American Revolution. Most recently, Eagle Scout candidate Brian Negrin did significant restoration work on the cemetery as part of his Eagle Scout project in 2011.

Vandals have damaged the cemetery on at least one occasion. According to a record in the Consistory's minutes from November 19, 1953, police were called because 17 headstones had been pushed over.

Veterans Buried in the Historic Monsey Cemetery
Name	Veteran of	Born	Died	Age
Dusenbury, Louis H.	Civil War	1824-10-14	1891-1-4	66y, 4m, 20d
Felter, Jacob	War of 1812	1793-9-16	1876-1-19	82y, 4m, 3d
Mackie, John	War of 1812	1794-2-20	1879-3-14	85y, 2m, 24d
Serven, Garret (Judge)	Revolutionary War	1756-1-10	1844-10-30	88y, 9m, 20d
Serven, John G.	War of 1812	1793-9-13	1878-1-12	84y, 4m, 0d
Taylor, Edward	War of 1812	1790-2-4	1856-3-3	66y, 0m, 29d
VanHouten, Peter C.	War of 1812	1771-12-29	1840-9-25	68y, 8m, 24d
VanOrden, Peter S. (General)	Revolutionary War and War of 1812	1763-8-14	1846-11-8	83y, 2m, 24d
Young, Charles	Civil War	1844-1-27	1919-6-25	75y, 4m, 28d

== Rockland County Christian School ==
Rockland County Christian School was founded in the spring of 1953. In effect, it was a Christian education ministry of the Monsey Church, although it was portrayed as less dependent than that. A school newsletter from that summer says, "The Monsey Church does not sponsor the school. In this sense, it is not parochial. Parents band together and they incorporate to accomplish this purpose." A constitution was adopted and an independent board of directors for the school was elected from the church's membership in May, 1953.

The school first opened in the church basement on September 9, 1953, with 14 pupils in kindergarten and grades 1 through 7, except grade 3. In fall 1954, the school had grown to 20 pupils and became accredited by the New York State Board of Regents. A total of 36 students were enrolled in the 1959–60 school year, the school's last year of operation.

Geraldine Steensma was the school's first full-time teacher, for five years, and Willemina Van Halsema, the sister of the church's pastor and a community worker at the church, also taught part-time the first two years. Other teachers at the school were Eleanor Sietsema, M. Louise Crawford, Faye Campbell (aide), James Stabile (music), Katherine Hunt, Donald Vittner, and Constance Pryce.

== Other Monsey churches ==
In spite of its nickname as the Monsey Church, there were other churches in Monsey in the 19th and early 20th centuries, but the Monsey Church was the first church in Monsey and the only one that remains. The building first used by the Monsey Church was near the intersection of what is today Maple Avenue and North Saddle River Road, adjacent to the Historic Monsey Cemetery. When the Monsey Church moved into its present building in 1869, the original building was sold and moved somewhere near today's Brewer Fire Engine Company at the intersection of Grove Street and North Saddle River Road. In 1871, this building was purchased by the Congregational Society and used as their meetinghouse.

In October 1871, about the same time that the Congregationalists began to meet in their new building, the Methodist Society established a new church in Monsey with members of the Spring Valley and Viola Methodist Churches. By 1876, as seen on the 1876 "Centennial" map of Monsey, the church had built a building to meet in on Secor Street. Sometime later, the building was destroyed in a fire. The property was later acquired by the Monsey Church and is now the site of its parsonage.
