= Plastic-clad silica fiber =

In telecommunications and fiber optics, a plastic-clad silica fiber or polymer-clad silica fiber (PCS) is an optical fiber that has a silica-based core and a plastic cladding. The cladding of a PCS fiber should not be confused with the polymer overcoat of a conventional all-silica fiber.

== Benefits ==
The main applications of plastic-clad silica fiber are industrial, medical or sensing applications where cores that are larger than those used in standard data communications fibers are advantageous.

== Limitation ==
PCS fibers in general have significantly lower performance characteristics, particularly higher transmission losses and lower bandwidths, than all-glass fibers.

== See also ==
- Plastic optical fiber
- Dispersion-shifted fiber
- Hard-clad silica optical fiber
