= Anne Tropper =

Physics professor

Anne C. Tropper
- Education: Somerville College, Oxford (BSc, PhD)
- Known for: Vertical External-Cavity Surface-Emitting Laser; Ytterbium-doped silica fibre lasers
- Scientific career
- Workplaces: University of Southampton

Anne C. Tropper (born 1954) is a Professor of Physics at the University of Southampton. Her work considers solid-state and semiconductor lasers; specifically the development of ytterbium-doped silica fibre lasers and Vertical External-Cavity Surface-Emitting Lasers. She was elected a Fellow of The Optical Society in 2006, and awarded the 2021 SPIE Maiman Laser Award for her contributions to laser source science and technology.

== Early life and education ==
Tropper was born in London in 1954, the daughter of mathematician A. Mary Tropper and electrical engineer Hans Tropper; she spent her childhood in her father's high-voltage laboratory. She eventually studied physics at the Somerville College, Oxford, where she was taught by Nina Byers. She was encouraged by Byers to stay at Oxford for a doctoral degree, and joined the laboratory of Mike Leask. After earning her PhD Tropper was awarded a Lindemann Fellowship, and joined an engineering consultancy before moving to the Almaden Research Laboratory in San Jose, California.

== Research and career ==
Tropper joined the University of Southampton in 1983. She worked alongside David Hanna on the development of ytterbium-doped silica fibres, and together demonstrated their potential in λ = 1μm optical amplifiers. These amplifiers allowed for high power operation as well as the broad spectra bandwidths required to amplify ultrashort optical pulses. In 1988 Tropper and Hanna were the first to show that ytterbium-doped silica fibres could be used as an optical gain medium, and went on to investigate the spectroscopic properties that underpin its performance. Tropper's early work on ytterbium-doped silica fibres went on to influence Gérard Mourou. In 1989 Tropper was a founding member of the University of Southampton Optoelectronics group.

In 1997 Tropper worked with Ursula Keller on the first passively mode-locked Vertical External-Cavity Surface-Emitting Laser (VECSEL). Tropper leads the VECSEL group at the University of Southampton and coordinates the annual SPIE conference on VECSELs. She was awarded a Personal Chair in 2000 and made Head of Department in 2002. She has investigated semiconductor lasers that emit femtosecond optical pulses.

In 2006 Tropper was elected a Fellow of The Optical Society. Tropper was appointed to the Institute of Physics Council in 2017. She was one of 1,400 academics who signed a letter to The Sunday Times in support of Britain remaining in the European Union.

Tropper was awarded the 2021 SPIE Maiman Laser Award for her contributions to laser source science and technology.

=== Selected publications ===
Her publications include:

- Tropper, Anne C. (1997). "Ytterbium-doped fiber amplifiers". IEEE Journal of Quantum Electronics. 33 (7): 1049–1056. Bibcode:1997IJQE...33.1049P. doi:10.1109/3.594865.
- Tropper, Anne C. (2006). "Passively modelocked surface-emitting semiconductor lasers". Physics Reports. 429 (2): 67–120. Bibcode:2006PhR...429...67K. doi:10.1016/j.physrep.2006.03.004.
- Tropper, Anne C. (2004-04-14). "Vertical-external-cavity semiconductor lasers" (PDF). Journal of Physics D: Applied Physics. 37 (9): R75–R85. doi:10.1088/0022-3727/37/9/R01. S2CID 250758815.

== Personal life ==
Tropper is married with three children.
