= Meir Hertz =

Community activist in Lakewood, NJ

Rabbi Meir Hertz
- מאיר נפתלי הרץ
- Born: Meir Naftali Hertz; 1948; Haifa, Israel
- Died: March 6, 2024 (aged 75); Lakewood, New Jersey, US
- Burial place: Beit Shemesh
- Education: Ner Yisroel, Beth Medrash Govoha
- Organization(s): Tashbar of Lakewood, Lakewood Tenants Organization
- Spouse: Chana Hertz

Meir Naftali Hertz (1948–2024) was a community activist in Lakewood, New Jersey. He was the founder and dean of Tashbar of Lakewood boys' school, as well as being founder and director of the Lakewood Tenants Organization, which administered Lakewood's Section 8 Housing program. He also served as Director of the Lakewood Housing Administration (LHA) and has been called "Lakewood's Housing Czar".

== Early life ==
Hertz was born in Haifa, Israel during the 1948 Palestine war. As a child he attended a Mamlachti dati school, where he devoted himself to the study of Tanakh. Due to his asthma, Hertz was unable to be in Haifa during the hot summer months, and instead stayed with his maternal grandfather, a Haredi Jew, in Jerusalem, where he was first exposed to Haredi Judaism, the path he later chose for himself.

At eight years old, his father asked him to do something. Hertz excused himself, explaining that he was unable to complete the task. In response his father told him, "There are two types of people in the world, those who make excuses and those who get the job done. Make sure you’re the second type."

When Hertz was a young teenager his family immigrated to the United States and settled in Far Rockaway, New York, where he attended Hebrew Institute of Long Island (HILI) for schooling through the eighth grade. Hertz became very close to his eighth-grade teacher, Rabbi Shea Fishman, who arranged for him to attend Ner Yisroel High School. There, he developed a lifelong connection with Rabbi Naftali Kaplan.

Hertz recounted how, as a student in Ner Yisroel, he once began perusing Maimonides' Guide to the Perplexed at 10:30 PM and didn't look up until it was 5:30 AM and he had completed the entire book. "Even as young bochur, he was like a kid with a mystery novel when it came to sefarim", his daughter says.

== Community activism ==
Hertz played a key role in establishing YTT, a boys primary school, and Mesivta Keser Torah, a boys secondary school, both in Lakewood. His motto was "when the going gets tough, the tough get going."

=== Lakewood Tenants Organization ===
Since 1977, LTO has contracted with the Township of Lakewood to administer Section 8 housing funds.

The impetus to create the organization began when Hertz lived in a crowded apartment complex, where the landlord neglected his basic duties and harassed the tenants with various and sundry fees. At one point, a single mom living in the building didn't have hot water, which the landlord refused to rectify. Hertz organized a rent strike for the entire complex, forming LTO in the process. After much lobbying and determination he prevailed, forming connections with Lakewood’s mayor and township officials on the way.

Reading the newspaper one day, Hertz learned that federal rent assistance was available, but Lakewood Township had refused the funds so as not to attract low-income residents. With his connections, Hertz lobbied township officials to accept the assistance, pledging to run HUD in such a way that it wouldn't have a negative effect on the town.

Under Hertz's leadership the program was consistently rated as over 99% compliant, the average rating in New Jersey is a bit under 78%.

=== Tashbar of Lakewood ===
In 1991, Hertz founded Tashbar of Lakewood, a private religious boys school for the ultra orthodox community, the school began with 25 students and has since grown to over 650. The school was the first one in town to translate the Bible in English, as opposed to Yiddish. This was due to Hertz's insistence that clarity and understanding are the fundamental principles of education, more important than memorization and traditional learning methods. Hertz used to go around the classes asking questions on what the boys were learning, offering cash prizes for good answers.

Hertz did not draw a salary from the school.

==== Criticism ====
Hertz has been criticized for mixing the two organizations' finances. Beginning in 2002, LTO issued a $4 million loan to Tashbar, which in turn loaned funds to Tuscana I, a private real estate development organization managed by Hertz’s brother, which proceeded to develop luxury homes on property acquired from the school. Lynn Albala, a New Jersey–certified public accountant and former head of the New Jersey Society of CPAs’ nonprofit group, described these transactions saying "the housing organization hasn’t properly documented its loans to the school, and that omission could be problematic… Giving a loan to a Jewish day school is not part of their mission, and they’re not reporting that."

Hertz maintained that once administrative funds were given to LTO, they can be used as the organization sees fit, including making loans to other organizations. The LTO asserted in a lawsuit against HUD that "the money is ‘defederalized,’ not subject to... federal spending rules once it’s passed through to the organization.” MaryAnn Russ, a former HUD deputy assistant secretary for public and assisted housing operations, disagreed. "There are strings attached to how HUD dollars can be spent. That’s where the Lakewood Tenants Organization may have violated federal rules, if you have extra administrative fees, you don’t get to spend them on what you want. The money is only for housing purposes" she said. The litigation is still ongoing as of 2025.

Hertz has also been criticized over his compensation package, which was $469,000 in 2016.

=== Outreach ===
In the early 1970s, Hertz organized Gefen Poriya, a system in which post-graduate students in Beth Medrash Govoha learned with local community members. He later helped found Ohr Somayach in Monsey, where he would give lectures from time to time.

In the summers of 1976 and 1977, the Hertz couple went on a Kiruv mission to Brazil with a toddler and three-week-old baby.

Under Rabbi Neustadt’s Vaad L’hatzalas Nidchei Yisroel, an organization which promoted Judaism under the soviet communists, the couple visited Russia in the winter of 1983. The KGB bugged their hotel room and followed the couple every step of the way. Prohibited from distributing religious items, the Hertzes smuggled in eight sets of tallis and tefillin, claiming "All these sets are ours, we have a weekday pair, one for Shabbos, for Ta’anis Esther, and for Purim… for each of us." (In Orthodox Judaism, men have one set of tefillin while women have none.)

== Personal life ==
Hertz married Chana Shick. Together they had eleven children, six boys and five girls, as follows: Avrohom Mordechai, Yitzchok, Dovid, Tzvi, Chaim, Chesky, Mrs. Gitty Eisenberg, Mrs. Rivky Birnbaum, Mrs. Matti Marcus, Mrs. Tzippy Colton, and Mrs. Hadassah Glantz. Tzvi died of a ruptured brain aneurysm at age 29, leaving four orphans with another on the way.
