= Zero-dispersion wavelength =

In a single-mode optical fiber, the zero-dispersion wavelength is the wavelength or wavelengths at which material dispersion and waveguide dispersion cancel one another. In all silica-based optical fibers, minimum material dispersion occurs naturally at a wavelength of approximately 1300 nm. Single-mode fibers may be made of silica-based glasses containing dopants that shift the material-dispersion wavelength, and thus, the zero-dispersion wavelength, toward the minimum-loss window at approximately 1550 nm. The engineering tradeoff is a slight increase in the minimum attenuation coefficient. Such fiber is called dispersion-shifted fiber.

Another way to alter the dispersion is changing the core size and the refractive indices of the material of core and cladding. Because fiber optic materials are already highly optimized for low scattering and high transparency alternative ways to change the refractive index were investigated. As a straightforward solution tapered fibers and holey fibers or photonic crystal fibers (PCF) were produced. Essentially they replace the cladding by air. This improves the contrast of refractive indices by a factor of 10. Therefore, the effective index is changed, especially for longer wavelengths. This type of refractive index change versus wavelength due to different geometry is called waveguide dispersion. As these narrow waveguides (~1-3 μm core diameter) are combined with ultrashort pulses at the zero-dispersion wavelength pulses are not instantly destroyed by dispersion. After reaching a certain peak power within the pulse the non-linear refractive index starts to play an important role leading to frequency generation processes like self-phase modulation (SPM), modulational instability, soliton generation and soliton fission, cross phase modulation (XPM) and others. All these processes generate new frequency components, meaning that input light with narrow bandwidth expands into a wide range of new colours, through a process called supercontinuum generation.

The term is also used, more loosely, in multi-mode optical fiber. There, it refers to the wavelength at which the material dispersion is minimum, i.e. essentially zero. This is more accurately called the minimum-dispersion wavelength.

== Zero-dispersion slope ==
The rate of change of dispersion with respect to wavelength at the zero-dispersion point is called the zero-dispersion slope. Doubly and quadruply clad single-mode fibers have two zero-dispersion points.

== See also ==
- Nonzero dispersion shifted fiber
