= Monsey, New York =

- CDP
- Location in Rockland County and the state of New York

- Location within the state of New York Monsey (the United States)
- Coordinates: 41°7′10″N 74°3′57″W
- Country: United States
- State: New York
- County: Rockland
- Town: Ramapo

Area
  - Total: 2.31 sq mi (5.97 km^{2})
  - Land: 2.29 sq mi (5.94 km^{2})
  - Water: 0.015 sq mi (0.04 km^{2})
- Elevation: 548 ft (167 m)

Population (2020)
  - Total: 26,954
  - Density: 11,756.8/sq mi (4,539.32/km^{2})
- Time zone: UTC-5 (Eastern (EST))
  - Summer (DST): UTC-4 (EDT)
- ZIP Code: 10952
- Area code: 845
- FIPS code: 36-48010
- GNIS feature ID: 0957535
- NWS SAME code: 036087

Monsey (English pronunciation: /ˈmʌnsi/, Yiddish: מאנסי, romanized: Monsi) is a hamlet and census-designated place in the town of Ramapo, Rockland County, New York, United States, north of Airmont, east of Viola, south of New Hempstead, and west of Spring Valley. The village of Kaser is surrounded by the hamlet of Monsey. The 2020 census listed the population at 26,954.

The hamlet has a large, and growing, community of Haredi Jews.

== History ==
Rockland County was inhabited by the Munsee band of Lenape Native Americans, who were speakers of the Algonquian languages. Monsey Glen, a Native American encampment, is west of the intersection of State Route 59 and State Route 306. Numerous artifacts have been found there and some rock shelters are still visible. The Monsey railroad station, named from an alternate spelling of the Munsee Lenape, was built when the New York & Erie Railroad passed through the glen in 1841.

In 1943, Rabbi Shraga Feivel Mendlowitz purchased a property in Monsey with the intention to raise the education level of Torah teachers. Named Aish Dos (Pillar of Fire), the institute comprised two buildings on a 16-acre plot. In 1944, it was reconstituted as Beth Medrash Elyon, Monsey's first Jewish institution.

In the 1950s, Monsey was a one stoplight town with a single yeshiva. In 1979, Rabbi Ezriel Tauber and a group of lay leaders purchased land in Monsey for the American campus of the Ohr Somayach Yeshiva.

By 1997, Monsey had 112 synagogues and 45 yeshivas.

Located in Monsey is the Houser-Conklin House, listed on the National Register of Historic Places in 2010.

Having the largest Orthodox Jewish community in Rockland County, Monsey has become a metonym for Orthodox Jews in all of Rockland, including those who live in neighboring hamlets and villages such as Viola, Airmont, and Spring Valley.

== Geography ==
Monsey is located at 41°7′10″N 74°3′57″W .

According to the United States Census Bureau, the CDP has an area of 2.2 square miles (5.8 km^{2}), of which 2.2 square miles (5.7 km^{2}) is land and 0.04 square mile (0.1 km^{2}) (0.90%) is water.

== Demographics ==
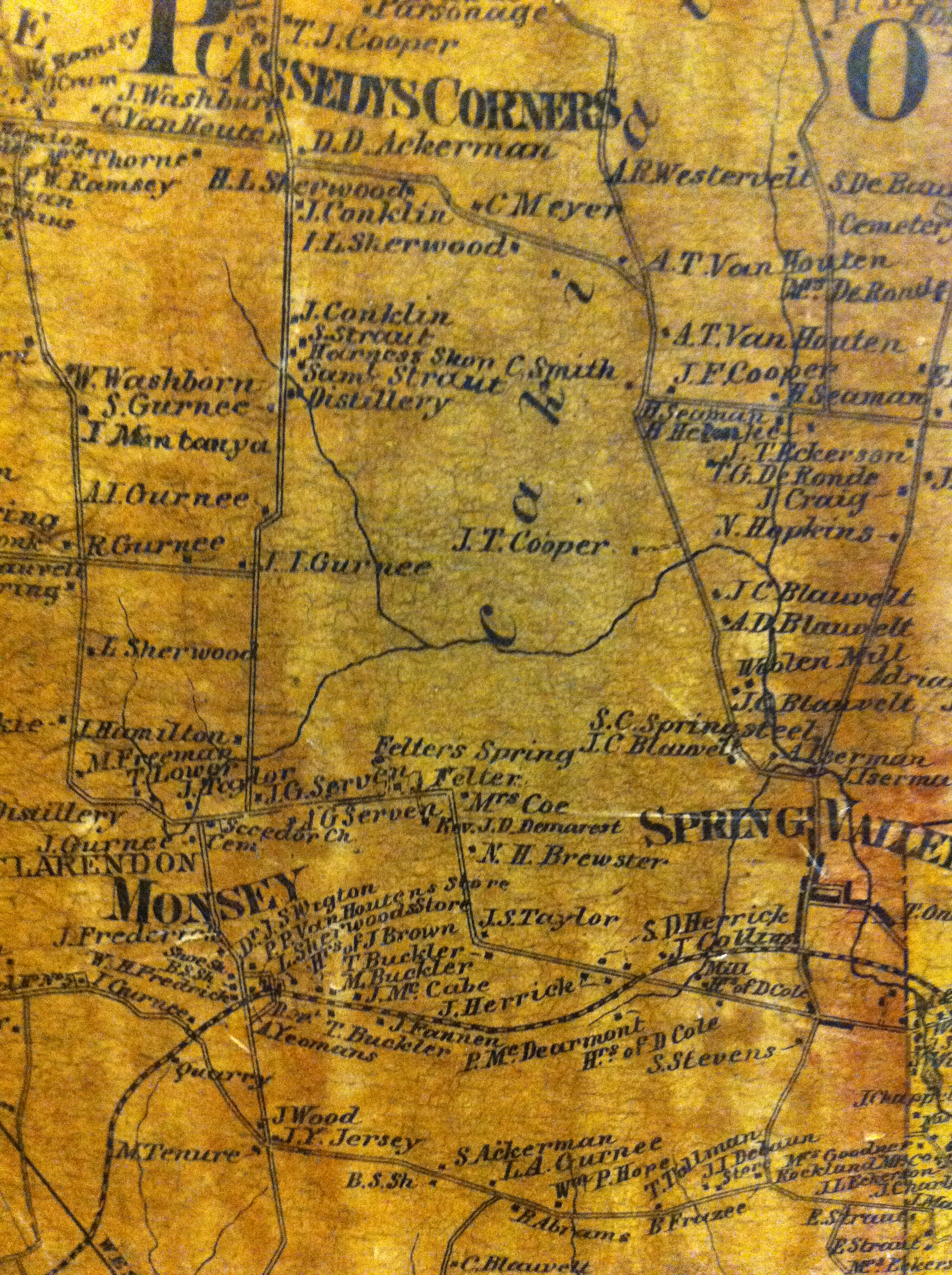
Map 1859

Historical population
Census	Pop.	Note	%±
1970	8,797		—
1980	12,380		40.7%
1990	13,986		13.0%
2000	14,504		3.7%
2010	18,412		26.9%
2020	26,954		46.4%

=== 2020 census ===
As of the 2020 census, Monsey had a population of 26,954. The median age was 15.7 years. 55.0% of residents were under the age of 18 and 6.1% of residents were 65 years of age or older. For every 100 females there were 104.4 males, and for every 100 females age 18 and over there were 103.0 males age 18 and over.

100.0% of residents lived in urban areas, while 0.0% lived in rural areas.

There were 5,002 households in Monsey, of which 69.6% had children under the age of 18 living in them. Of all households, 84.2% were married-couple households, 6.8% were households with a male householder and no spouse or partner present, and 8.2% were households with a female householder and no spouse or partner present. About 6.5% of all households were made up of individuals and 3.6% had someone living alone who was 65 years of age or older.

There were 5,302 housing units, of which 5.7% were vacant. The homeowner vacancy rate was 2.5% and the rental vacancy rate was 2.3%.

Racial composition as of the 2020 census
Race	Number	Percent
White	25,017	92.8%
Black or African American	261	1.0%
American Indian and Alaska Native	34	0.1%
Asian	45	0.2%
Native Hawaiian and Other Pacific Islander	2	0.0%
Some other race	977	3.6%
Two or more races	618	2.3%
Hispanic or Latino (of any race)	664	2.5%

=== 2000 census ===
There were 2,981 households, out of which 58.9% had children under the age of 18 living with them, 78.0% were married couples living together, 6.0% had a female householder with no husband present, and 12.9% were non-families. 10.6% of all households were made up of individuals, and 4.4% had someone living alone who was 65 years of age or older. The average household size was 4.74 and the average family size was 5.16. In the CDP, the population was spread out, with 48.6% under the age of 18, 10.5% from 18 to 24, 18.2% from 25 to 44, 16.3% from 45 to 64, and 6.4% who were 65 years of age or older. The median age was 19 years. For every 100 females, there were 106.8 males. For every 100 females age 18 and over, there were 106.6 males. The median income for a household in the CDP was $45,194, and the median income for a family was $45,911. Males had a median income of $41,606 versus $33,576 for females. The per capita income for the CDP was $14,000. About 25.4% of families and 30.6% of the population were below the poverty line, including 37.8% of those under age 18 and 9.2% of those age 65 or over.

=== Languages ===
43.98% speak English at home, 41.48% Yiddish, 6.88% Hebrew, 2.69% French or a French creole, 1.85% Spanish, and 1.24% Russian.

=== Jewish community ===
Monsey is a major center of Orthodox Judaism in the United States, along with several other cities such as Kiryas Joel, Kaser, Spring Valley, and New Square. It is the largest center of Hasidic Judaism in the U.S. outside New York City, with approximately 5,400 households (4.2% of the world's Hasidic population). The migration to Monsey began in the late 1940s when New York City's Orthodox Jews were seeking affordable real estate for their quickly growing communities. These spaces offered the possibility of moving en masse and establishing enclaves where they could lead lives based on halakha (Jewish religious law) without coming into regular conflict with non-Orthodox neighbors. This represented a major, distinct suburban demographic shift for these communities. Major Hasidic sects represented in Monsey include Satmar, Vizhnitz Monsey, Sanz and Belz, with the rebbes of Berditchev, Lizensk, Lizensk (Rokeah), Nikolsburg, Sambor Yerushalayim-Monsey, Sassov, Shinave, Spinka Monsey, and Stanislov sects residing in the community. Vizhnitz maintains a cemetery in Monsey.

On December 28, 2019, Monsey was the site of a mass stabbing in the home of a Hasidic rebbe of the Kosonyu sect who was hosting a Hanukkah party, leaving four injured and one dead.

== Notable people ==
- Shalom Auslander (born 1970), author of Foreskin's Lament, which covers his time growing up in Monsey
- Julia Haart (born 1971), fashion designer and entrepreneur
- Mordechai Hager (1922–2018), rebbe of the Hasidic sect of Vizhnitz
- Steven Hill (1922–2016), actor, Mission: Impossible, Law & Order
- Yaakov Kamenetsky (1891–1986), rabbi who lived in Monsey from 1967 until his death.
- Yosef Mizrachi (born 1968), kiruv rabbi
- Michael Rogers (born 1963), publisher, journalist, fundraiser, activist
- Zevi Samet (born 2003), college basketball player
- Mordechai Shapiro (born 1989), singer
- Tovia Singer (born 1960), counter-missionary radio host, author and speaker
- Charlotte Thompson (1843–1898), actress
- Leib Tropper (1950–2024), founding rabbi of the Kol Yaakov Torah Center
- Andrew Carpenter Wheeler (1835–1903), prominent theatrical reviewer, editor, author

== Places of interest ==
- Houser-Conklin House, a historic structure dating to 1775
- Monsey Church (currently New Hope Christian Church), built in 1824
- Ohr Somayach, a men's college of Judaic studies
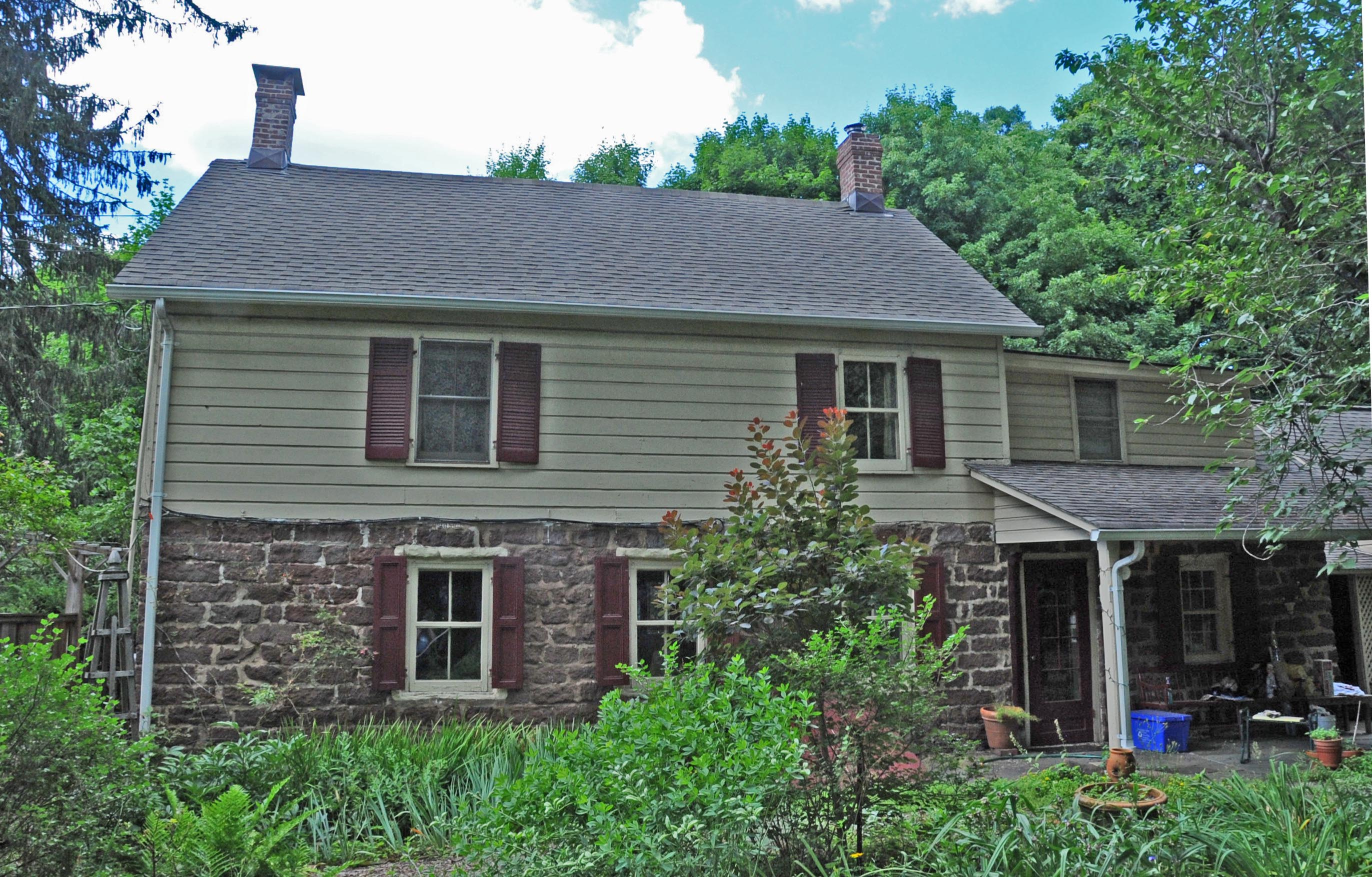
Houser-Conklin House

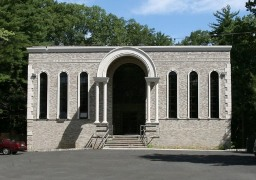
Bais Hamidrash

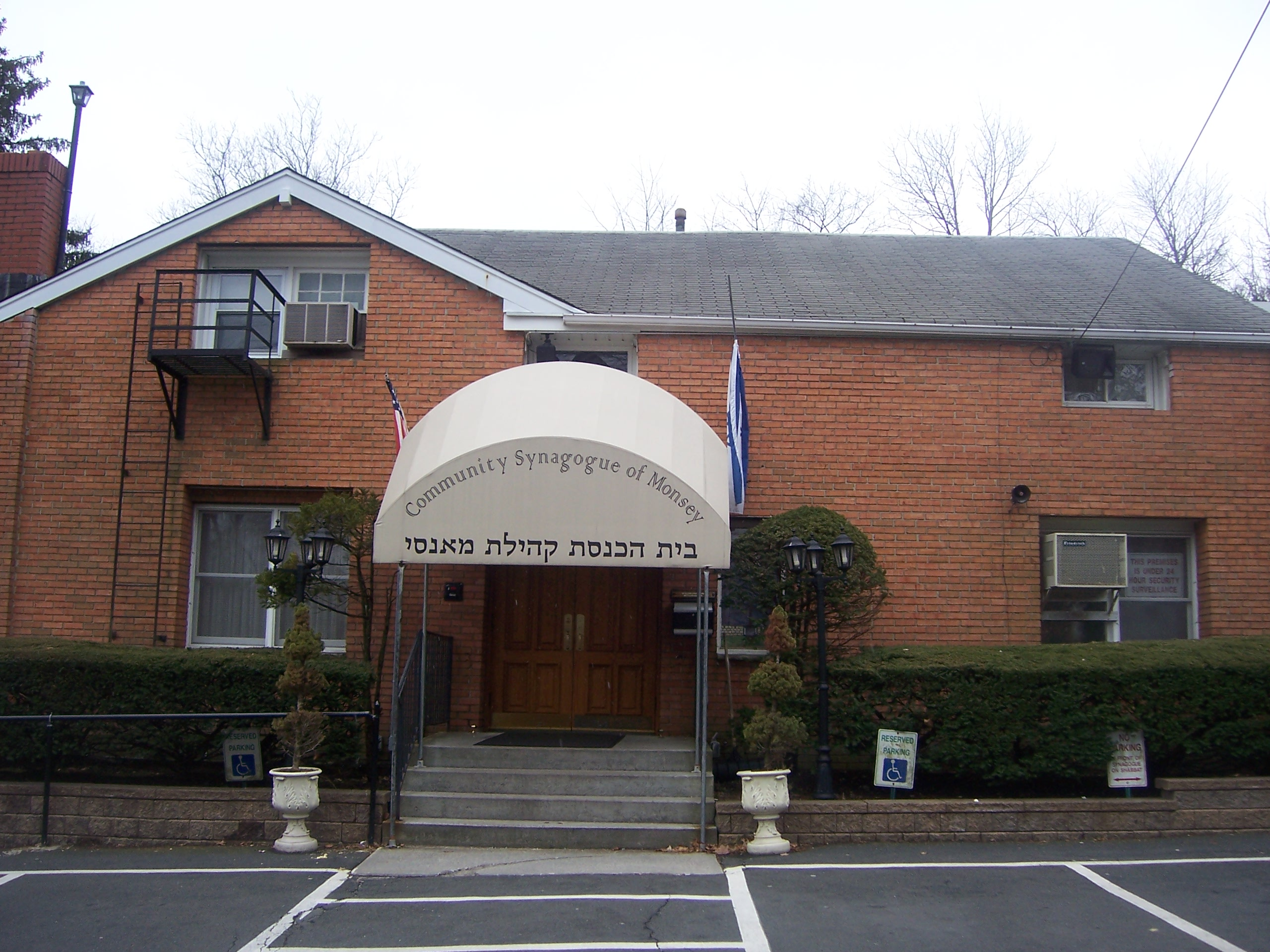
Community Synagogue

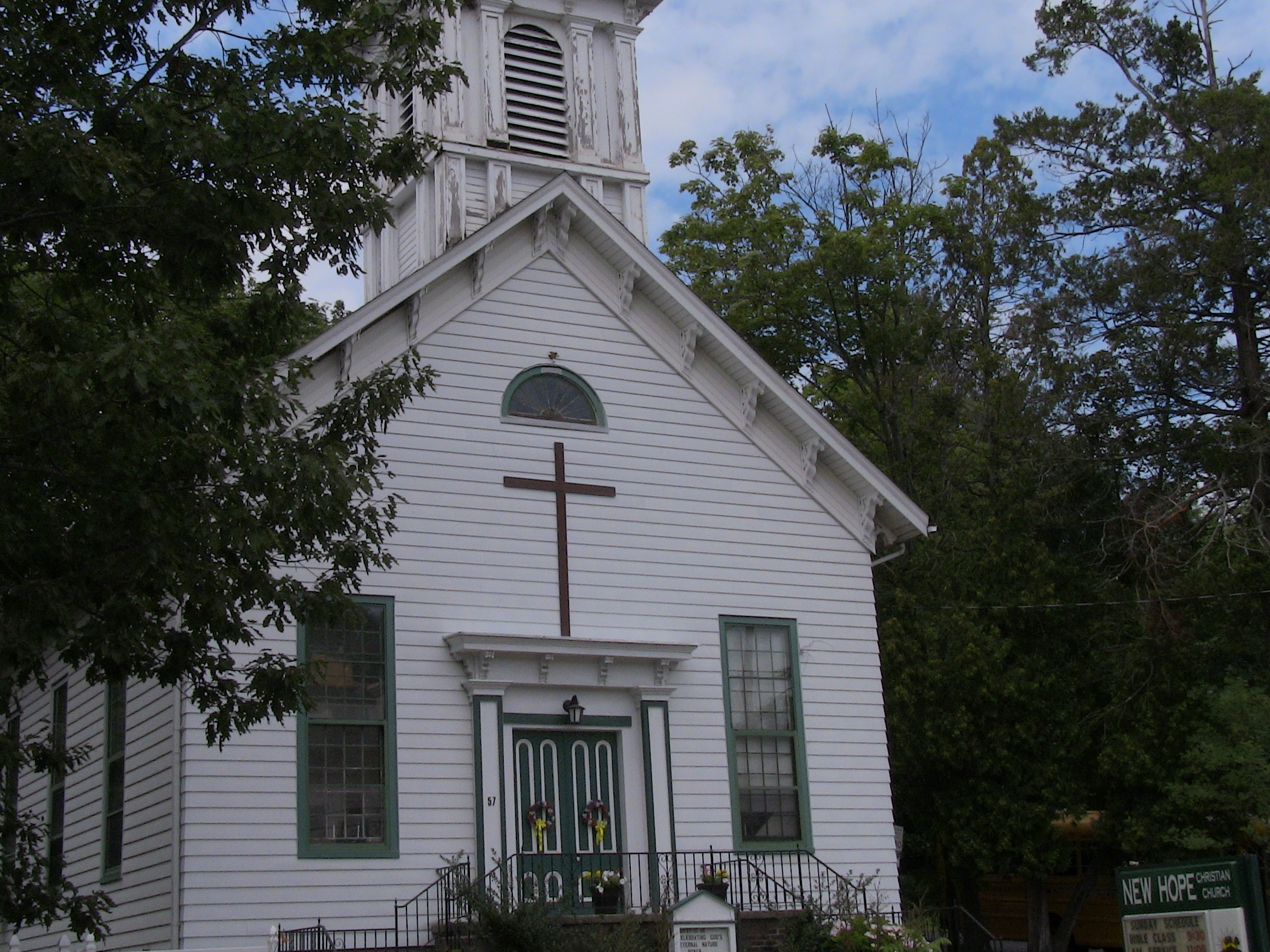
New Hope Christian Church

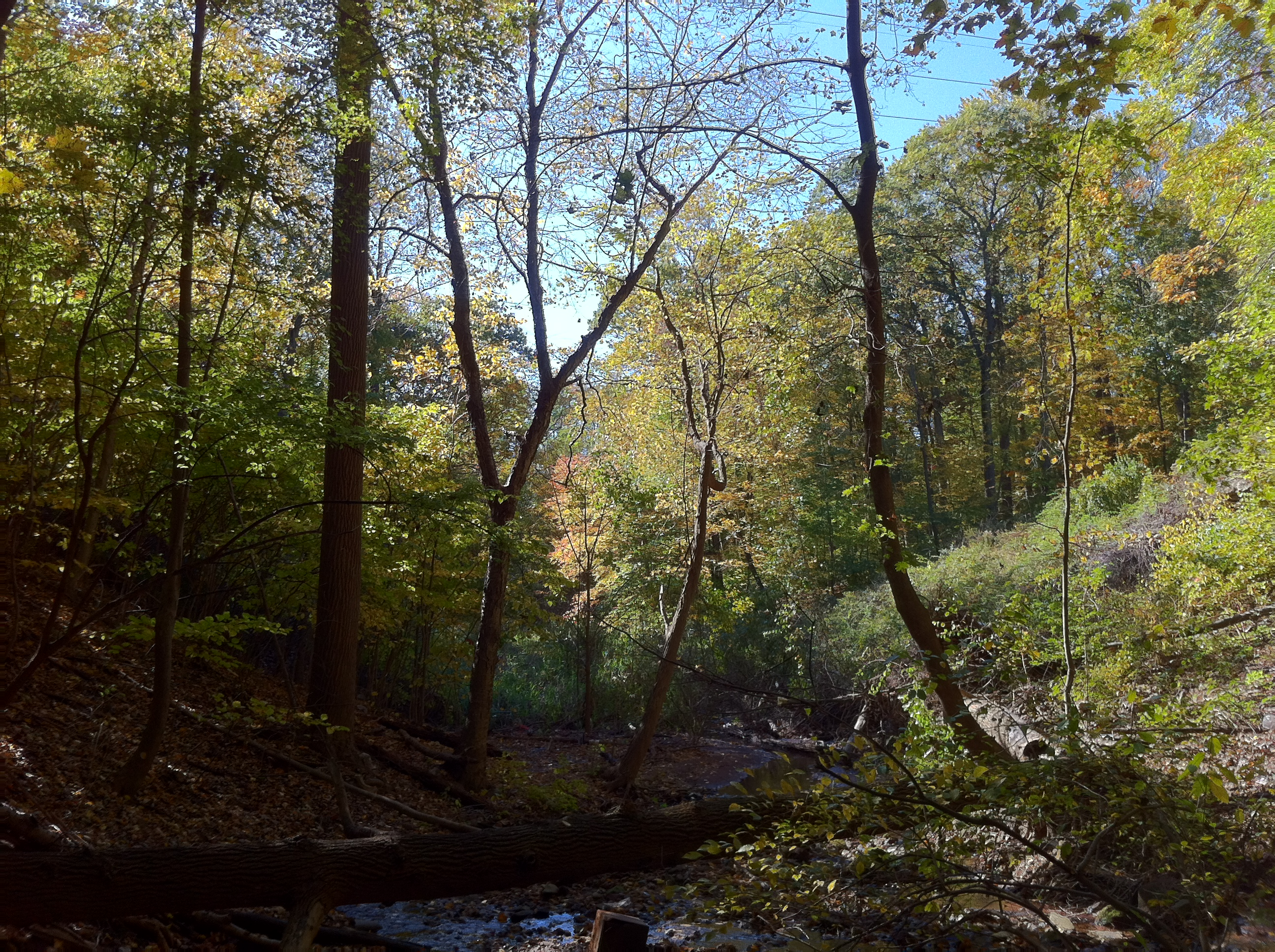
Monsey Glen Park

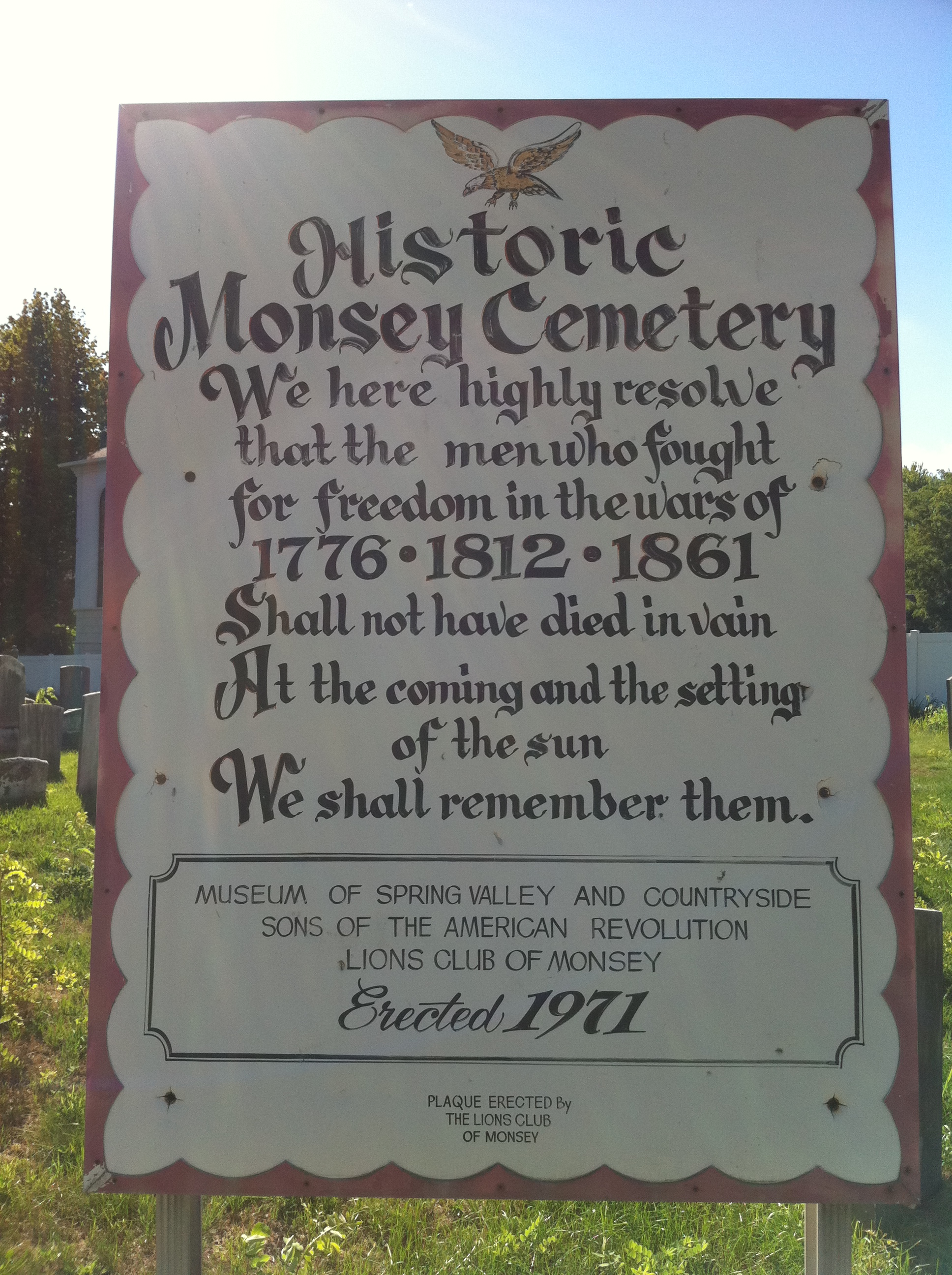
Historic Monsey Cemetery

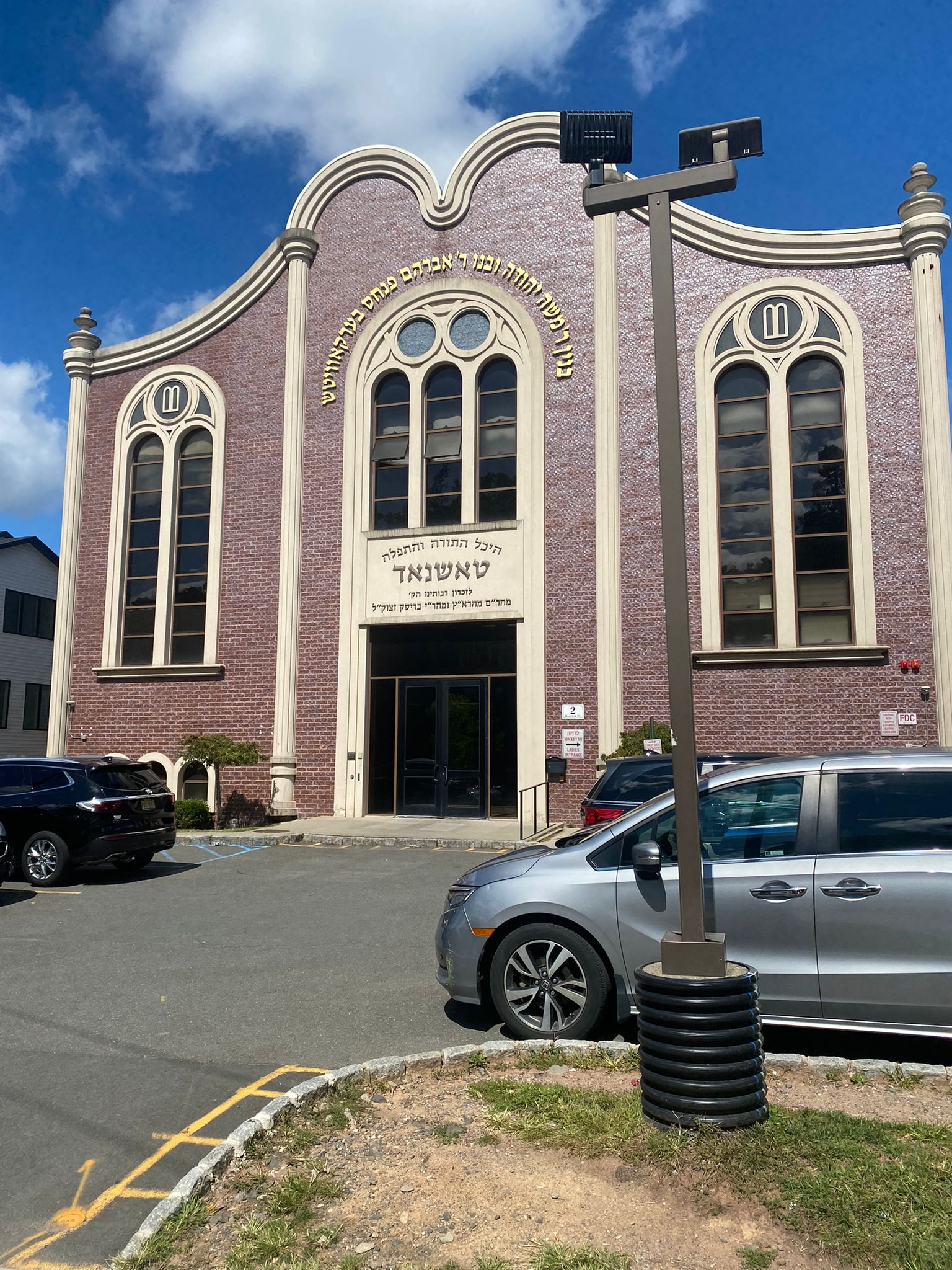
Toshnad Monsey

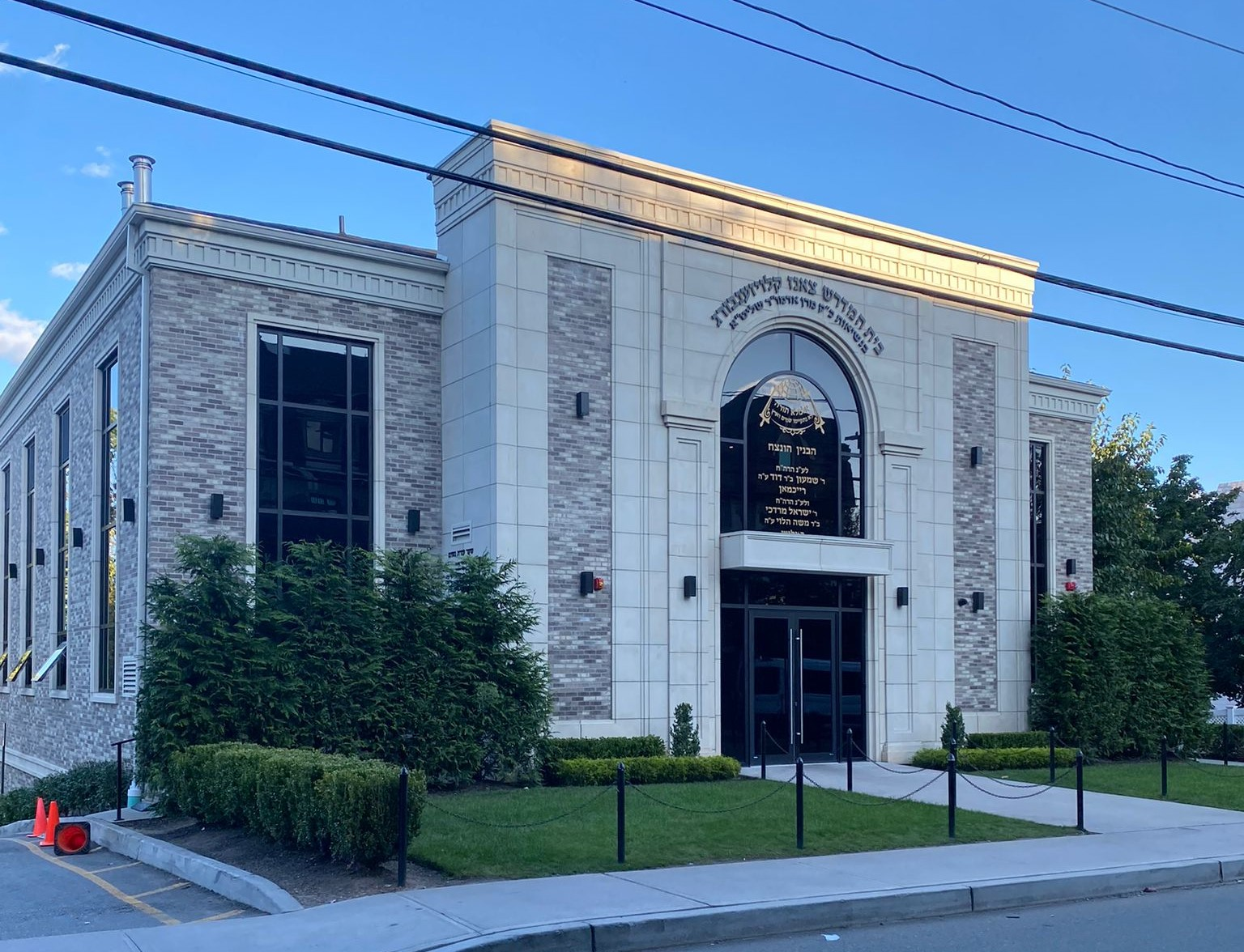
Sanz Klausenburg Mans

== See also ==
- New Square, New York − an all-Hasidic village in the same county
- Lakewood Township, New Jersey – a majority Orthodox Jewish township
