= Houser-Conklin House =

Historic house in New York, United States

- U.S. National Register of Historic Places
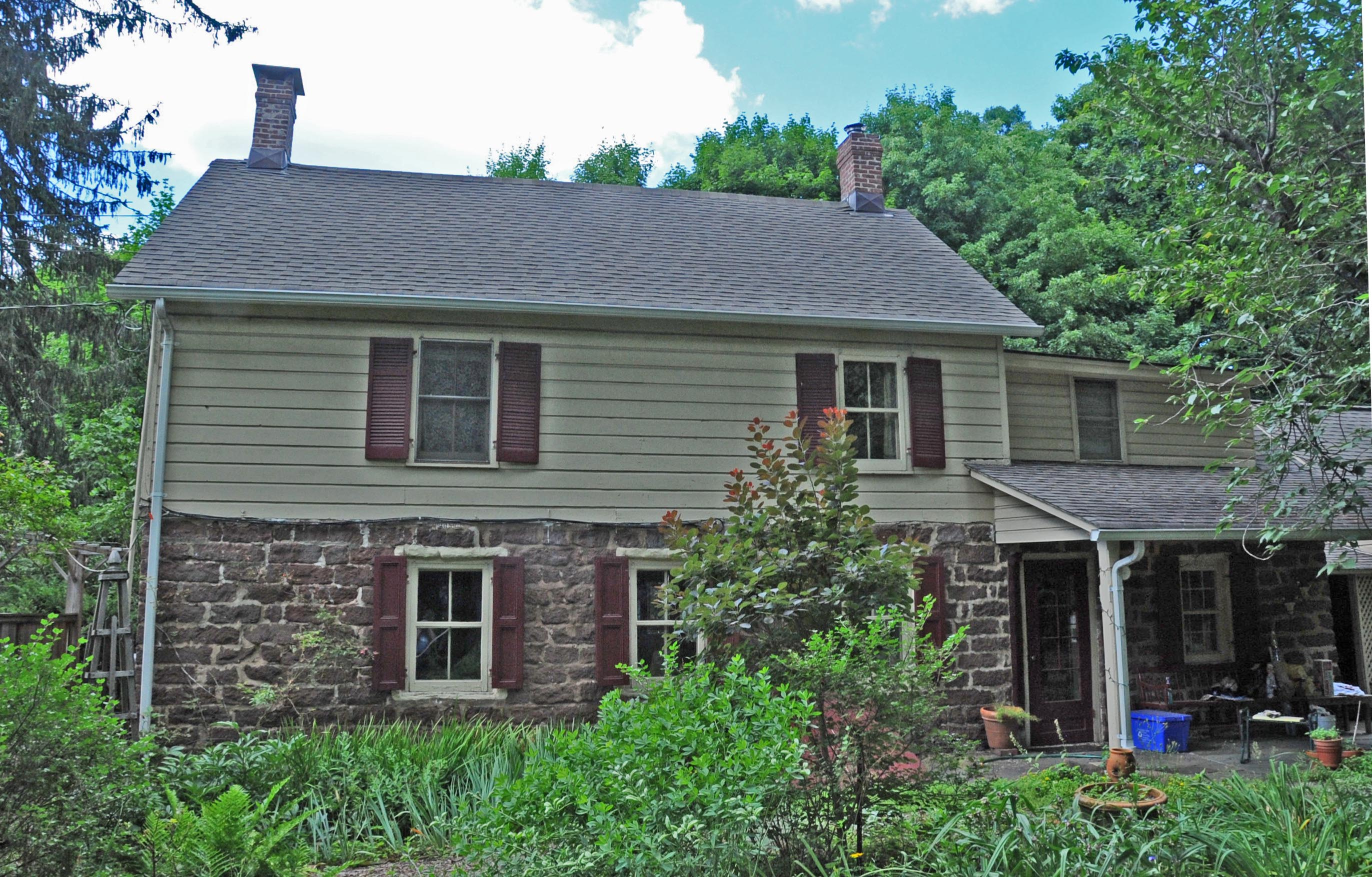

- Location within New York Location within the United States
- Location: 246 New York State Route 306, Monsey, New York
- Coordinates: 41°8′5″N 74°4′0″W
- Area: 1.6 acres (0.65 ha)
- Built: c. 1775
- NRHP reference No.: 10000808
- Added to NRHP: October 1, 2010

Houser-Conklin House is a historic home located in Monsey in Rockland County, New York. It was originally built c. 1775 as a 1 1/2-story, gable roofed sandstone dwelling, and subsequently raised to 2-stories with a frame addition dating to c. 1890–1900. Attached to this main block is a 1 1/2-story kitchen wing and attached to that is a modern addition.

It was listed on the National Register of Historic Places in 2010.
