= Brendan Scaife =

Irish physicist and engineer

Brendan Kevin Patrick Scaife FTCD, MRIA, Boyle Laureate (/skeɪf/; born 19 May 1928), is an Irish academic engineer and physicist who carried out pioneering work on the theory of dielectrics. Scaife founded the Dielectrics Group in Trinity College Dublin where he is Fellow Emeritus and formerly Professor of Electromagnetism, and previously to that a professor of engineering science.

Scaife showed that in a linear system the decay function is directly proportional to the autocorrelation function of the corresponding fluctuating macroscopic variable, and proved how the spectral density of the dipole moment fluctuations of a dielectric body could be calculated from the frequency dependence of the complex permittivity, $\epsilon(\omega)=\epsilon'(\omega)-i\epsilon''(\omega)$. It was independent of Ryogo Kubo who in 1957 developed the corresponding theory for magnetic materials. The work was published prior to the work of Robert Cole in 1965 which is often cited.

== Early life ==
Scaife was born in London on 19 May 1928 and just after World War II he began his undergraduate studies in the Department of Electrical Engineering at Queen Mary College, University of London; he graduated in 1949. At Queen Mary College there was a high-voltage laboratory run by Hans Tropper, whose lectures on electromagnetic theory inspired Scaife. After graduation, he began research into the properties of insulating materials under Tropper's direction. Scaife's doctoral research broke new ground in the study of dielectrics.

== Career ==
=== Complex permittivity of polar liquids ===
Scaife was the first scientist to successfully measure the complex permittivity of a number of polar liquids such as eugenol, glycerol and water as a function of pressure up to 12 kbar. This is published in a research note in Proc. Phys. Soc. B, 68 (1955) 790. Up to that time, Chan and Danforth working in Bridgman's laboratory in the US, had measured essentially the equilibrium relative permittivity ε(ω) of a number of liquids. At the time the experimental facilities in this area of research were severely limited. Commercial bridges for measuring complex permittivity were not available. A three terminal transformer coupled ratio arm bridge based on Blumlein's invention prior to the War had been constructed at Queen Mary by an Indian student S. Sharan for his PhD work. This bridge was applied successfully to measurements of samples subjected to high pressures. After completing this work and a brief period of employment with GEC in Wembley, he returned with his Irish parents to Ireland where he remained for the rest of his career in spite of many offers from abroad.

=== Dublin Institute for Advanced Studies; work with Schrödinger and Fröhlich ===
Scaife joined the Dublin Institute for Advanced Studies in 1954. Here Prof. Erwin Schrödinger was still a Senior Professor as was Cornelius Lanczos. The work of these two leading theoretical physicists of the 20th century was a source of great inspiration to him and helped in shaping his future work. In 1961 he joined the School of Engineering at Trinity College.

His interest in the theory of dielectrics led to a collaboration with Herbert Fröhlich at the University of Liverpool, where he was a regular visitor in the 1950s and 1960s. He developed a lifelong friendship with Fröhlich and the members of his research group. Scaife sought to apply the work of Callen and Welton (1951) on the Fluctuation-dissipation theorem to Frohlich's work on dipole moment fluctuations in dielectric bodies. This work on the theory of dielectrics culminated in a long report in 1959 published by the Electrical Research Association (now ERA Technology Ltd) on "Dispersion and fluctuation in linear systems with particular reference to dielectrics". In this he pointed out that, in a linear system, the decay function was directly proportional to the autocorrelation function of the corresponding fluctuating macroscopic variable. He showed how the spectral density of the dipole moment fluctuations of a dielectric body could be calculated from the frequency dependence of the complex permittivity ε(ω) = ε'(ω) – iε"(ω). This work was later published in Progress in Dielectrics, 1963. It was independent of Ryogo Kubo who in 1957 developed the corresponding theory for magnetic materials. The work was published prior to the work of Robert Cole in 1965 which is often cited.

The theory of the equilibrium relative permittivity $\epsilon(\omega)$ of dipolar substances had been developed by Kirkwood (1939) and Fröhlich (1948), who built on the pioneering work of Debye (1913) and Onsager (1936). It was hoped that the results of his 1959 report could be used to generalise the work of Onsager, Kirkwood and Fröhlich and to obtain a theory for the frequency dependence of the complex permittivity $\epsilon(\omega)=\epsilon'(\omega)-i\epsilon''(\omega)$. The first step was to clarify the concept of the reaction field introduced by Onsager. Once this had been done it was possible to see how a generalisation of Onsager's equation for $\epsilon(0)$ to the frequency-dependent case would be obtained. Such an equation was published in a short note in 1964 in the Proceedings of the Physical Society of London 84, 616. The justification of this equation had first appeared in an Electrical Research report, which Scaife published in 1965. A more extended version was given in Complex Permittivity published in 1971.

=== Inertial effects ===
In the work published up to 1965, inertial effects had not been fully taken into account. An early attempt to remedy this deficiency was made by Rocard in 1933. A major advance was made by Sack (1953,1957) and Gross (1955). Sack's work was based on the Fokker Planck equation governing the temporal evolution of the orientational distribution for molecules. In an attempt to clarify the physical aspects of the problem, Scaife derived Sack's results by starting from the stochastic Langevin equation (1908) of molecular rotational brownian motion.

His work on the plane rotator, and also for the sphere, was published for the first time in 1971; it was published in collaboration with John T. Lewis and James Robert McConnell (also a Boyle Laureate) in Proceedings of the Royal Irish Academy A, 76 (1976) 43 (It is for this paper that he appears in Famous Trails to Paul Erdős). In the work on inertial effects it had been usual to neglect dipole-dipole coupling. A correct procedure to remedy this neglect was described in his book published in 1989. Unfortunately an exact, self-consistent solution of the proposed Langevin equation is not possible. Whether an adequate approximate solution can be obtained is still an open question.

=== Polarizability plot for representing high-frequency data ===
In 1963 Scaife suggested replacing the complex permittivity $\epsilon(\omega)$ Cole–Cole plot (1941), with a polarizability plot, $\alpha(\omega)$. In this plot, $\alpha''(\omega)$ is plotted against $\alpha'(\omega)$, where $\alpha'(\omega)$ and $\alpha''(\omega)$ are the real and imaginary co-ordinates of the function

$$\alpha(\omega)=\alpha'(\omega)-i\alpha''(\omega)=(\epsilon(\omega)-1)/(\epsilon(\omega)+2),$$

which is directly proportional to the complex polarizability of a macroscopic sphere of unit radius. It has been shown by a number of investigators that the polarizability plot is superior to the Cole–Cole plot for representation of high-frequency dielectric data. His book Principles of Dielectrics published in 1989 (updated in 1998) contains many results and discussions which had not been previously published.

=== Casimir effect; high field effects; alkali halides; Garrett Scaife and high-pressure studies ===
With his research student T. Ambrose, Scaife applied the theory of dipole moment fluctuations to retardation effects (the Casimir effect) in Van der Waals forces, With another student, W.T. Coffey, he explored the extension of Onsager's theory to take account of high field effects on the polarisation of dipolar materials.

With research students K. Raji, J. C. Fisher, K. V. Kamath and V. J. Rossiter he carried out experimental studies of the equilibrium permittivity of alkali halides when subjected to high pressures. Results were reported in several papers. He was helped by his elder brother, W. Garrett Scaife, whom B. K. P. Scaife had first got interested in dielectrics. Later Garrett Scaife took a keen interest in designing and automating the high-pressure equipment and establishing the dielectric measuring techniques, and devoted a good part of his career studying the dielectric properties of liquids and liquid crystals under high pressures.

=== Collaboration with J. H. Calderwood ===
For several years Scaife was a visiting professor at the University of Salford and in collaboration with Professor J. H. Calderwood, he published a number of important papers. In one of the papers published in the Philosophical Transactions of the Royal Society of London, 269 (1971) 217, they showed that the complicated transient voltage and current behaviour observed in liquids under irradiation can be explained by a simple model of the motion of space charge in a dielectric medium.

=== Ferrofluids and other interests ===
In collaboration with his colleague and former research student, P.C. Fannin, he designed a split toroid technique ("Fannin's (Toroidal) Technique") to measure the magnetic susceptibility of ferrofluids. He also explored the dispersion of the frequency dependent magnetic susceptibility of these fluids, developing the necessary underlying theoretical understanding. This is published in a number of papers from 1986 to 1991. This work has laid the foundation of yet another important area of research.

Besides his interest in dielectrics and magnetic fluids, he has made contributions to telecommunications, mathematical methods in signal processing and to the history of science and technology. In regard to the latter, while working with his former research student and colleague Sean Swords on a study of the early history of radar, he made contact with many of the pioneers of radar: the information and insights he acquired materially contributed to a new understanding of the international beginnings of radar. Sean Swords' doctoral thesis (under Scaife's supervision) was published as Vol.6 in the IEE History of Technology Series.

Scaife edited Vol.IV of The Mathematical Papers of Sir William Rowan Hamilton He has also published a biography of James MacCullagh, another Irish mathematician and theoretical physicist, and contemporary of Hamilton.

Scaife together with another former student, J. K. Vij, developed a new theory of absorbance for the electromagnetic spectrum. His results contradicted the works published in the literature at the time. This was published in J. Chem. Phys. 122, 174901 (2005) and was verified experimentally through a series of high-precision experiments and published [Phys Rev. E 80, 021704 (2009)].

=== Fellowship of Trinity College Dublin and other recognition ===
He was elected to Fellowship of Trinity College Dublin (F.T.C.D.) in 1964 and was appointed reader in 1966. In 1967 he became an associate professor. In 1972 he was appointed to a chair of engineering science and in the same year was elected to the Royal Irish Academy. He was awarded a D.Sc. (Eng.) of the University of London for his published work in 1973. In 1986 he was elected to a Personal Chair in Electromagnetism in recognition of his international reputation in the field of Dielectrics. He was awarded the Boyle Medal of the Royal Dublin Society in 1992.

Trinity College Dublin awards the B.K.P. Scaife Prize to undergraduate students in electronic and electrical engineering in his honour.

== Bibliography ==
He has authored (and/or edited) six books:

- Complex permittivity (1971) English Universities Press;
- Studies in Numerical Analysis: Papers in Honour of Cornelius Lanczos (1974) Academic Press;
- Radio Science in Ireland (1981) Royal Irish Academy, ISBN 0-901714-19-4 (0-901714-19-4)
- Principles of Dielectrics (1989) Clarendon Press;
- James MacCullagh, M.R.I.A., F.R.S., 1809–1847, Proceedings of the Royal Irish Academy 90C (3) (1990), 67–106
- The Mathematical Papers of Sir William Rowan Hamilton, Volume IV (Geometry, Analysis, Astronomy, Probability and Finite Differences, Miscellaneous), (2000) published by Cambridge University Press.
- Scaife, B. K. P.; Vij, J. K. The Journal of Chemical Physics (2005) 122, 174901.
- Scaife, B. K. P.; Sigarev, A. A.; Vij, J. K.; Goodby, J. W. Physical Review E (2009) 80, 021704.
