= Guido Hoheisel =

German mathematician (1894–1968)

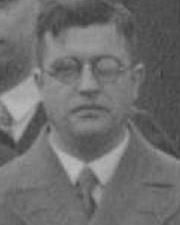
Guido Hoheisel (1930)

Guido Karl Heinrich Hoheisel (14 July 1894 – 11 October 1968) was a German mathematician and professor of mathematics at the University of Cologne.

== Academic life ==
He did his PhD in 1920 from the University of Berlin under the supervision of Erhard Schmidt. During World War II Hoheisel was required to teach classes simultaneously at three universities, in Cologne, Bonn, and Münster. His doctoral students include Arnold Schönhage.

Hoheisel contributed to the journal Deutsche Mathematik.

== Selected results ==
Hoheisel is known for a result on gaps between prime numbers: He proved that if π(x) denotes the prime-counting function, then there exists a constant θ < 1 such that

π(x + x^{θ}) − π(x) ~ x^{θ}/log(x),

as x tends to infinity, implying that if p_{n} denotes the n-th prime number then

p_{n+1} − p_{n} < p_{n}^{θ,}

for all sufficiently large n. He showed that one may take

θ = 32999/33000 = 1 - 0.000(03),

with (03) denoting periodic repetition.

== Selected works ==
- Gewöhnliche Differentialgleichungen 1926; 2nd edition 1930; 7th edition 1965
- Partielle Differentialgleichungen 1928; 3rd edition 1953
- Aufgabensammlung zu den gewöhnlichen und partiellen Differentialgleichungen 1933
- Integralgleichungen 1936; revised and expanded 2nd edition 1963
- Existenz von Eigenwerten und Vollständigkeitskriterium 1943
- Integral equations translated by A. Mary Tropper [1968, c1967]
