= Hard-clad silica optical fiber =

Hard-clad silica (HCS) or polymer-clad fiber (PCF) is an optical fiber with a core of silica glass (diameter: 200 μm) and an optical cladding made of special plastic (diameter: 230 μm). In contrast to all-silica fiber, the core and cladding can be separated from each other.

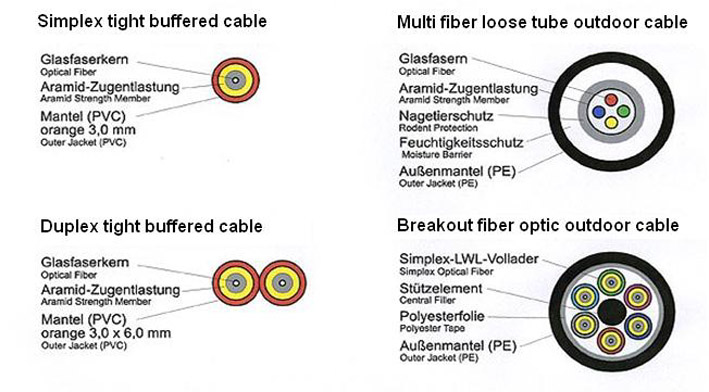
Configuration of HCS- and fiber glass-fiber optic cables

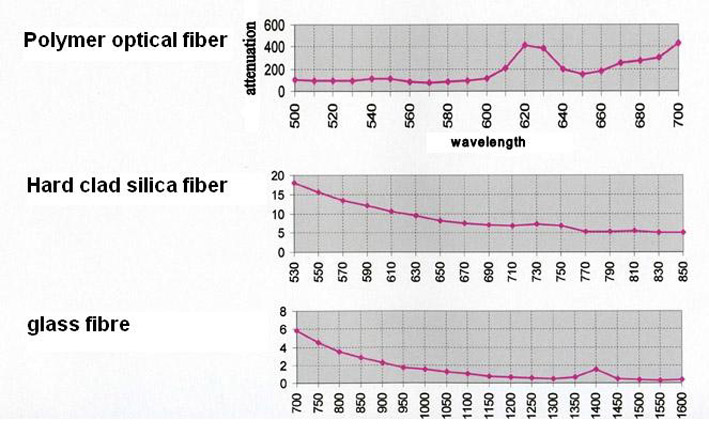
Spectral attenuation of fiber optics

Due to their medium bandwidths and transmission rates of less than 100 Mbit/s, HCS fibers are suitable for distances of up to 2 km, e.g. in local networks in buildings and industry. Generally, the following applies: The higher the attenuation, the shorter the distance.

For comparison, plastic optical fibers (POF) have low bandwidths and transmission rates (typically 100 Mbit/s). They also have a high attenuation and therefore, the maximum distance is around 100 meters. Glass fibers on the other hand have very high bandwidths and transmission rates of up to GBit/s. The attenuation in glass fibres is much lower, glass fibers can cover distances of more than 10 km. Regarding bandwidth and distances, HCS fibers are situated between POF and multimode or singlemode fibers.

Application area fiber types
Fiber type	Core/Cladding	Application area	Distance	Data rate
Glass fiber	9/125 μm 10/125 μm	telecommunications	more than 10 km	MBit/s up to Gbit/s
Glass fiber	50/125 μm 62.5/125 μm	local networks in medium areas, buildings and telecommunications	up to 4 km	<155 Mbit/s
HCS	200/230 μm	local networks in buildings and telecommunications	up to 2 km	<100 Mbit/s
Plastic fiber (POF)	980/1000 μm	local networks in buildings, industry and automotive	up to 100 m	100 Mbit/s

== See also ==
- Plastic-clad silica fiber
