= Silica fiber =

Type of filament material made from waterglass

Silica fibers are fibers made of sodium silicate (water glass). They are used in heat protection (including asbestos substitution) and in packings and compensators. They can be made such that they are substantially free from non-alkali metal compounds.

Sodium silicate fibres may be used for subsequent production of silica fibres, which is better than producing the latter from a melt containing SiO_{2} or by acid-leaching of glass fibres. The silica fibres are useful for producing wet webs, filter linings and reinforcing the material.

They can also be used to produce silicic acid fibres by a dry spinning method. These fibres have properties which make them useful in friction-lining materials.

== See also ==
- Optical fiber
  - All-silica fiber
