= Hans Tropper =

Portrait of Hans Tropper displayed in the seminar room of Queen Mary College

Hans Tropper (1905–1978) was an Austrian Professor of Electrical Engineering with research interest in breakdown strength of liquid insulation. The ‘Hans Tropper Memorial Lecture’ is held in his honour to open each IEEE International Conference on Dielectric Liquids. He also briefly worked for Elin Aktiengesellschaft fur Elektrische Industrie.

== Early life ==
Hans Tropper was born in 1905, in Vienna, Austria. He was an only child born to parents Johann and Josefa. As well as having no siblings, he also had no aunts or uncles. Tropper was brought up by his mother for most of his teenage years after his father was killed during WWI while serving as an officer in the Austrian Army.

== Personal life ==
Tropper married A. Mary Barnett, also a doctor (in mathematics), in 1947, becoming a British citizen in the same year. They had two daughters together, including physicist Anne Tropper.

== Academic career ==
Tropper received his PhD in 1939. In 1956, Hans Tropper was appointed as a senior lecturer at Queen Mary College London, reading electrical engineering. His personal research interest was in the dielectric breakdown strength of insulating liquids. In 1969 he was made professor of electrical engineering at the same college. During this time, he oversaw 56 doctorate theses and 7 masters’ dissertation students as either supervisor or advisor, including students at Queen Mary College London as well as many international candidates. Notable students include Brendan Scaife.

Tropper was responsible for the running of the high voltage laboratory at Queen Mary College, the first at a UK University.

Tropper published Electric Circuit Theory - An Introduction to Steady State and Transient Theory Based on the Superposition Principle in 1949.

== Memorial lecture ==
Hans Tropper contributed substantially to the field of dielectric materials. In recognition of this, a memorial lecture was held in the second International Conference on Dielectric Liquids (ICDL) after his death (the eighth sequential conference), at Pavia, Italy. The ICDL conference is an international conference that focuses on results and practical experience of properties, dielectric phenomena and applications of insulating liquids, bringing together an international audience to share knowledge around this field.

The paper associated to the memorial lecture is typically published as part of the conference proceedings. A history of Hans Tropper Memorial Lectures is given below.

Year (Conference Edition)	Location	Presenter	Title
1984 (8)	Pavia, Italy	T.J. Lewis	Electronic Processes in Dielectric Liquids Under Incipient Breakdown Stress *
1987 (9)	Salford, UK	N.J. Félici	Blazing a Fiery Trail with the Hounds
1990 (10)	Grenoble, France	Unknown	Unknown
1993 (11)	Baden-Dättwil, Switzerland	P. Atten	Electrohydrodynamic Instability and Motion Induces by Space Charge in Insulating Liquids
1996 (12)	Roma, Italy	K. Yoshino	Electronic Processes in Liquids of Aromatic and Conjugated Structure
1999 (13)	Nara, Japan	Unknown	Unknown
2002 (14)	Graz, Austria	J.K. Nelson	Motion at the Liquid-solid Interface - Developing Design Tools from Fundamental Models
2005 (15)	Coimbra, Portugal	C.W. Fabjan	Fundamental Physics with Noble Liquid Detectors
2008 (16)	Poitiers, France	M. Pompili	Partial Discharge Measurements in Dielectric Liquids
2011 (17)	Trondheim, Norway	A. Denat	Conduction and Breakdown in Dielectric Liquids
2014 (18)	Bled, Slovenia	E. Gockenbach	Liquids in High Voltage Equipment
2017 (19)	Manchester, UK	H. Okubo	Kerr Electro-optic Electric Field Measurement and Electrical Insulation Performance in HVDC Liquid Dielectric Systems
2019 (20)	Rome, Italy	J. Yagoobi	Transport of Heat and Mass with Electrical Field – from Earth to Space

^{∗}Not published as part of conference proceedings, instead published in IEEE Transactions on Electrical Insulation Vol. EI-20 No.2, April 1985
