= A. Mary Tropper =

British mathematician

Agnes Mary Tropper (née Barnett; 1917–2009) was a British mathematician, textbook author, and translator.

== Early life and education ==
Agnes Mary Barnett was born in Sheffield in 1917, and grew up in London. She was educated at Christ's Hospital, a boarding school in Hertford, supported by a scholarship from the county of London. She read mathematics at Bedford College, London, a school for the higher education of women in the University of London that later became part of Royal Holloway, University of London, and earned first-class honours in 1939. She also earned an education diploma from the London Institute of Education, another school of the University of London that later merged into University College London as the UCL Institute of Education.

In the early 1940s she studied part-time for a master's degree at Birkbeck College, while working as a teacher. She completed a Ph.D. in 1953, through the University of London. Her doctoral dissertation, Infinite Matrices: A Study of Sequence Transformations and Reciprocals, was supervised by Richard G. Cooke.

== Teaching career and later life ==
Barnett taught at the Godolphin School in Salisbury from 1940 to 1942, and then in Harrow. In 1946, she became a lecturer at Queen Mary College. Soon after, she married another academic at the college, Austrian electrical engineer Hans Tropper, changed her name to his, and began raising a family (two daughters) with him. One daughter, Anne Tropper (born 1954), later became a notable physicist.

Despite being told that "to continue her career, her main priority must be the College", she continued at Queen Mary, focusing primarily in teaching, administration, and textbook authorship rather than mathematics research.

She died on 6 February 2009.

== Books ==
Tropper was the author of:

- Linear Algebra / An Introduction to Linear Algebra (London: Nelson, 1969, 1981; New York: Elsevier, 1969)
- Matrix Theory for Electrical Engineers / Matrix Theory for Electrical Engineering Students (London: Harrap, 1962, 1966; Reading, Massachusetts: Addison-Wesley, 1962; German translation, Mannheim: Bibliographisches Institut, 1964, 1975; French translation, Paris: Masson, 1965; Spanish translation, Madrid: Paraninfo, 1967)

Her translations from German into English include:

- Integral Equations (Guido Hoheisel; London: Nelson, 1967)
- Introduction to Modern Mathematics (Herbert Meschkowski; London: Harrap, 1968)
