= The Banner (magazine) =

American Christian magazine

- Categories: Christian
- Frequency: monthly
- Founder: John Yeury de Baun
- Founded: 1866
- Company: Christian Reformed Church in North America
- Country: United States
- Language: English

The Banner is a magazine published by the Christian Reformed Church in North America. It was originally published as The Banner of Truth by the Rev. John Yeury de Baun in the 1860s and '70s for the benefit of the True Reformed Dutch Church in America. De Baun was granted permission by the denominational synod meeting in New York, New York in June, 1866, to publish a monthly periodical at his own expense. It began as a monthly publication out of Hackensack, New Jersey.

Issues of The Banner of Truth generally printed sermons from important early figures in the True Reformed Dutch Church (e.g., James D. Demarest and Solomon Froeligh), doctrinal treatises, denominational and church news, records of marriages and deaths, poems and puzzles on spiritual or doctrinal themes, and numerous proverbs or aphorisms.

In 1887, de Baun became pastor of LaGrave Avenue Christian Reformed Church in Grand Rapids, Michigan, and continued publishing the magazine from there. De Baun sold the magazine in 1903 to a group of businessmen, who increased the frequency of publication from monthly to bi-weekly and shortened the name to The Banner. The Christian Reformed Church bought the magazine in 1914, which continues to be published to this day.
