= Non-zero dispersion-shifted fiber =

Non-zero dispersion-shifted fiber (NZDSF), specified in ITU-T G.655, is a type of single-mode optical fiber which was designed to overcome the problems of dispersion-shifted fiber. NZDSF is available in two primary flavours: NZD+ and NZD-, which differ in their zero-dispersion wavelengths. These are typically around 1510 nm and 1580 nm, respectively. Because the zero-dispersion point of NZDSF is outside of the normal communications window, four-wave mixing and other non-linear effects are minimized. Other types of NZDSF include RS-NZDSF which has a reduced slope in its change of dispersion and large core NZDSF which further reduces residual non-linear distortion under high launch power.

Some long-haul fiber paths will alternate NZD+ and NZD- segments to provide self-dispersion compensation with uniformly low dispersion across the minimum-loss window at 1550 nm.
