= Leib Tropper =

Rabbi Leib Tropper (born 1950 in New York City, died 2024) was the founder of the Kol Yaakov Torah Center, which was located in Monsey, New York.

== Career ==
Tropper worked for Ohr Somayach in Jerusalem, and later become the educational director of Ohr Sameach, New York located in Yonkers and Monsey. In 1981, Tropper joined Rabbi Avrohom Gershon Tress in founding a new yeshiva for baalei teshuva, the Kol Yaakov Torah Center, and became its rosh yeshivah (dean).

=== Eternal Jewish Family ===
Tropper founded the Eternal Jewish Family (EJF) project, which advocated more rigorous standards for conversion to Judaism, and made it easier for intermarried families to get a conversion. Until 2009 he was the director and chairman of EJF's Rabbinic Committee. The organization was funded by Thomas Kaplan and his nephew, Guma Aguiar, who donated at least $8 million to the project, according to IRS documents.

=== Sex and Theft Scandals ===
In October 2009, Tropper was sued by Guma Aguiar for allegedly misappropriating funds given to him by Guma for charitable purposes. Tropper says that Aguiar threatened to throw him out a window. Aguiar's attorney denied any threat was made.

In 2006, The Jewish Week reported allegations that Tropper revoked a woman's conversion after learning that the woman "occasionally wore pants". Tropper denied this accusation, claiming the woman had in fact been breaking the Shabbat after her conversion, and that his role was confined to relaying this information to the appropriate authorities.

In early December 2009, recordings circulated on the internet that contained conversations between Tropper and a woman whose conversion he had been supervising, encouraging the woman to engage in sexual activities with others; the two also discuss having sex with each other. Tropper released a statement through his attorney that admitted no wrongdoing and expressed regret for “what has appeared to be conduct not within our significant laws of modesty.”

On December 14, 2009, the EJF announced that Tropper had resigned two days earlier, that he had been replaced as chairman of the Rabbinic Committee by Rabbi Elya Ber Wachtfogel, that Rabbi Chaim Blum would be taking over as interim director, and that Rabbi Reuven Feinstein, the chairman of the Halachic Committee, would take a more active role in overseeing the organization's activities. No reason was given for these changes. On December 18, 2009, Wachtfogel issued a letter denying that EJF is under his direction. The press release was then deleted from EJF's website. On December 20, EJF put out a new press release omitting all mention of Wachtfogel or the chairmanship of the Rabbinic Committee.

However the New York Post reported of tapes in which Tropper is heard encouraging a pretty, blond 32-year-old woman who Tropper was guiding through conversion to participate in phone sex and actual sex with men the rabbi knows, including one he calls "the Satmar guy." Tropper, who calls the woman "darling" and "cutie pie," talks about his own love affair with her at one point, saying: "I want to shqueeze you." He also fantasized about rape. "I could role-play a rape with you but I couldn't actually rape you -- you know what I'm saying, darling -- does that make sense?" he asks. The scandal rocked the Orthodox community from Rockland to Israel, and transcripts of the sex tapes circulated on Jewish blogs, with the audio posted on YouTube. On the tapes Tropper talked about paying her money for a lawyer and a stipend of $1,300 for the month of November. He also mentions putting in writing an agreement between the two. "Why would you want to document that kind of agreement on an e-mail?" she asked him. The woman, who identifies herself on the tape, apparently recorded the phone conversations. "It was only supposed to go to a few leading rabbis," She later told The Post. She refused to comment further, and later released a statement saying, "While an individual 'rabbi' acted in an inappropriate manner, my desire to become a bona fide Jew is undeterred." She also reportedly told a Jewish blog, failedmessiah.com, that Tropper would tell her: "If you fulfill my needs, I'll fulfill yours -- and you need a conversion."

On 14 February 2010 Tropper was to be summoned to a meeting in the Yeshiva Bais Mikroh of Monsey where the Rabbonim were to demand that Tropper resign all his posts and leave Monsey. Before the meeting, Tropper signed an agreement which stated “In not fulfilling the requirement of Shulchan Aruch that a leader be 'Pirko No’eh' (פרקו נאה), the undersigned is relinquishing his position.” Tropper also stated that he "released all rights and severs any connection he has to his former Yeshiva in Monsey and withdraws forthwith as a trustee of the organization." Tropper also stated his agreement to move out of Monsey within a few months.
