= Ohr Somayach, Monsey =

Coordinates: 41.134584°N 74.064754°W

Ohr Somayach
- Monsey, New York

Information
- Type: Baal teshuva yeshiva
- Established: 1977
- Closed: c. 2019
- Affiliation: Orthodox Judaism
- Administration: Isaac Rokowsky, Abraham Rokowsky, David Wexler, Israel Rokowsky.
- Website: os.edu

Ohr Somayach, Monsey (officially titled the Ohr Somayach Tanenbaum Educational Center) was an accredited men's college of Judaic studies offering both full and part-time programs.

Its curriculum was designed to provide students with an appreciation for and understanding of classical Jewish texts and Jewish philosophy and from an Orthodox Jewish perspective.

In addition, the yeshiva ran an outreach program called Legacy Retreats and hosted family getaways and retreats in its Beit Shvidler Conference center.

== History ==
In 1977, the Ohr Somayach yeshiva in Jerusalem, Israel established an American campus in Yonkers, New York. After two years, Rabbi Ezriel Tauber together with a group of lay leaders purchased land in Monsey, New York to service a full-time Judaic learning center.

Monsey was chosen because of its proximity to New York City (approximately 35 miles (56 km) northwest of the city) as well as the Jewish local infrastructure that ensured easy availability of kosher food and amenities.

They maintained the name Ohr Somayach and enlisted Rabbi Israel Rokowsky as dean.

As of 2019, Ohr Somayach has ceased operating as a yeshiva. However, under the leadership of Ohr Somayach alumnus Rabbi Yosef Simon, and under the guidance of some of the former leadership of Ohr Somayach, a new organization called Toras Dovid now operates a yeshiva for ba'alei tshuva, as well as a kollel for ba'alei tshuva.

== Administration ==
- Isaac Rokowsky
- Abraham Rokowsky
- David Wechsler
- Rabbi Israel Rokowsky, co-Rosh Yeshiva emeritus
- Rabbi Yisroel Simcha Schorr, co-Rosh Yeshiva emeritus
- Rabbi Naftali Reich
- Rabbi Pinchas Kasnett

== Student body ==
The student body used to come from across North America and most countries with a Jewish population. For many students, Ohr Somayach was their first exposure to full-time Jewish and Torah study. For more advanced students, higher-level classes were offered with the aim of acquiring the skills for self-sufficient Talmud study.

== Campus ==
The yeshiva is located in Monsey, New York on a 10-acre (40,000 m^{2}) campus which includes a beit midrash and a residence facility. The adjacent Beit Shvidler complex (a 40000 sq ft retreat and conference center) houses the Ohra VeSimcha family retreats.

Monsey is home to a Haredi community whose residents often provided students with Shabbat hospitality.

== See also ==
- Ohr Somayach, Jerusalem, its counterpart in Israel
- Baal teshuva
- Jewish fundamentalism
- Orthodox Judaism outreach
- Yeshiva
