= Vertical-external-cavity surface-emitting-laser =

Type of semiconductor laser

A vertical-external-cavity surface-emitting-laser (VECSEL) is a small semiconductor laser similar to a vertical-cavity surface-emitting laser (VCSEL). VECSELs are used primarily as near infrared devices in laser cooling and spectroscopy, but have also been explored for applications such as telecommunications.

== Comparisons with VCSELs ==
Unlike a VCSEL, in which two high-reflecting mirrors are incorporated into the laser structure to form the optical cavity, in a VECSEL one of the two mirrors is external to the diode structure. As a result, the cavity includes a free-space region. A typical distance from the diode to the external mirror would be 1 cm. Several workers demonstrated optically pumped VECSELs, and they continue to be developed for many applications including very high power diode laser sources for use in industrial machining (cutting, punching, etc.) because of their unusually high power (see below) and efficiency when pumped by multi-mode diode laser bars.

However, electrically pumped VECSELs (another matter entirely), were the brainchild of Aram Mooradian, an engineer known for fundamental contributions to diode laser linewidth studies, who worked for many years at MIT Lincoln Laboratory in Lexington, Massachusetts. Mooradian formed a company, Novalux, Inc., which was the first to demonstrate VECSELs (which they called "NECSELs"). Applications for electrically pumped VECSELs include frequency doubling of near-IR VECSEL emitters to attain compact powerful sources of single-mode blue and green light for projection display purposes.

== Semiconductor gain ==
One of the most interesting features of any VECSEL is the thinness of the semiconductor gain region in the direction of propagation, less than 100 nm. In contrast, a conventional in-plane semiconductor laser entails light propagation over distances of from 250 μm upward to 2 mm or longer. The significance of the short propagation distance is that it minimizes the effect of "antiguiding" nonlinearities (the same phenomenon is coincidentally quantified by the linewidth enhancement factor relating to Mooradian's above-mentioned earlier work) in the diode laser gain region. The result is a large-cross-section single-mode optical beam which is not attainable from in-plane (a.k.a. "edge-emitting") diode lasers.

In a VECSEL, the external mirror permits a significantly greater area of the diode to participate in generating light in a single mode, resulting in much higher power than otherwise attainable. Monolithic VCSELs emit powers in the low milliwatt range. By contrast, at the 2004 Optical Society of America "Conference on Lasers and Electro-Optics," held in San Francisco, California, one company (Coherent, Inc.) announced 45 watt continuous wave single-mode emission from an optically pumped VECSEL. Numerous other companies and organizations worldwide have adopted the optically pumped architecture for its simplicity.
