= Dispersion-shifted fiber =

Dispersion-shifted fiber (DSF) is a type of optical fiber made to optimize both low dispersion and low attenuation.

== Description ==
Dispersion Shifted Fiber is a type of single-mode optical fiber with a core-clad index profile tailored to shift the zero-dispersion wavelength from the natural 1300 nm in silica-glass fibers to the minimum-loss window at 1550 nm. The group velocity or intramodal dispersion which dominates in single-mode fibers includes both material and waveguide dispersion. Waveguide dispersion can be made more negative by changing the index profile and thus be used to offset the fixed material dispersion, shifting or flattening the overall intramodal dispersion. This is advantageous because it allows a communication system to possess both low dispersion and low attenuation. However, when used in wavelength division multiplexing systems, dispersion-shifted fibers can suffer from four-wave mixing which causes intermodulation of the independent signals. As a result, nonzero dispersion-shifted fiber is often used.

Dispersion-shifted fiber is specified in ITU-T G.653.
