= John A. DeBaun Mill =

- U.S. National Register of Historic Places
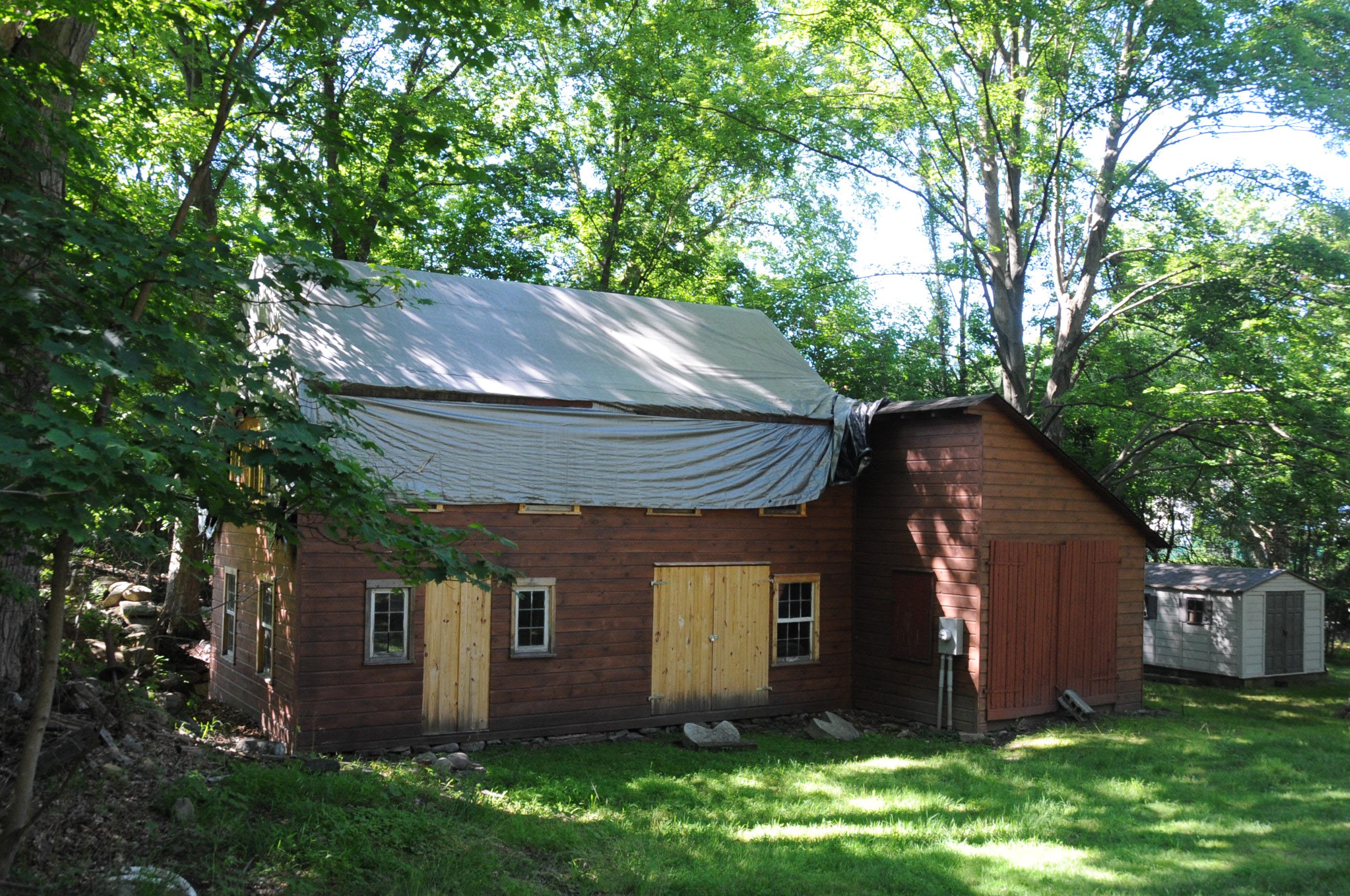

- Location within New York Location within the United States
- Location: NY 59, N side, opposite Highview Ave., Tallman, New York
- Coordinates: 41°6′45″N 74°6′16″W
- Area: 2.3 acres (0.93 ha)
- Built: 1845
- Architect: DeBaun, John A.
- NRHP reference No.: 93000852
- Added to NRHP: September 2, 1993

John A. DeBaun Mill is a historic grist mill located at Tallman in Rockland County, New York. It was built about 1845 and is a two-story, four by two bay, heavy timber frame, clapboard sheathed main block on a rubble stone foundation. The main block is flanked by large shed roofed one story wings. The property includes the mill building, a portion of the mill stream, and the site of the mill pond. It regularly functioned as a mill until 1906.

It was listed on the National Register of Historic Places in 1993.
