= Tallman, New York =

Coordinates: 41°06′40″N 74°06′00″W

Tallman is a hamlet in the town of Ramapo, Rockland County, New York, United States, located north of the state of New Jersey; east of Suffern; south of Montebello and west of Airmont. It is located north-northwest of New York City.

== History ==
In 1667, the Duke of York sent three lords to rule over Pennsylvania, one of them being Lord Phillip Tallman. He later renounced his lordship when he married a commoner and settled the town of Tallman, New York.

Tallman was named after Tunis Tallman, a direct descendant of Rockland's oldest family, who opened a store in 1838. Henry Tallman was Ramapo's Town supervisor and many considered him to be Tallman's founding father. The John A. DeBaun Mill was established about 1845 and listed on the National Register of Historic Places in 1993.

The Tallman Volunteer Fire Department (TVFD) celebrated its 100th anniversary in 2009. The TVFD organized in 1909 as a bucket brigade. The first horse-drawn piece of equipment came in 1910 and not until the mid-1920s did they use motor vehicles. Today the company uses high-tech engine, ladder and rescue equipment. As of 2009, the Department had about 60 active members, a ladies auxiliary and a junior firefighters program for teens. W. H. "Jiggy" Brubaker, who had served the department since 1938 and in 2009 was still responding to almost every daytime call, said at that time, "It's a 70-year-old habit".

== Books and publications ==
- Zimmerman, Linda Rockland County: Century of History
