= Wilson P. Foss Jr. =

American art collector (1891–1957)

Wilson P. Foss, Jr.
- Born: circa 1891; Haverstraw, New York, US
- Died: November 17, 1957 (aged 66); New York City, New York, US
- Education: Yale University
- Occupation: art dealer
- Employer(s): Parish-Watson & Co.
- Board member of: New York Trap Rock Company (chairman)

Wilson Perkins Foss, Jr. (circa 1891 – November 17, 1957) was an American art collector, art dealer, and businessman. As a knowledgeable collector of Eastern art and vice-president of art dealers Parish Watson & Co. for 23 years, he helped establish collections at museums such as the Metropolitan Museum of Art, and the National Gallery of Art. He also was chairman of the New York Trap Rock Corporation (now Tilcon), the largest supplier of crushed rock for roads and construction in the state at the time.

== Early life ==
Foss was born in Haverstraw, New York. He was the son of Anna de Baun and Wilson Perkins Foss, the first mayor of Haverstraw and co-founder of Conklin and Foss, Inc which was a crushed rock business. Foss Sr. rose from being an explosives expert and dynamite manufacturer to being president and board chairman of the New York Trap Rock Corporation; he was an avid collector of pottery and the National amateur billiards champion from 1901 to 1904. In 1908, the family moved to Under Elms, a riverfront 21-room mansion Foss Sr. built on 37 acres in Upper Nyack, New York.

Foss Jr. attended The Hill School in Pottsville, Pennsylvania, graduating in 1910. In the summer of 1910, he and his sister vacationed at Mount Washington in New Hampshire. For the trip, they drove a Matheson automobile.

Foss attended Yale University, graduating with a B.A. and Ph.B. in 1913. While at Yale, he was a member of the Fraternity Delta Psi (St. Anthony Hall). He also was the quarterback of the freshman football team and was elected team captain.

During World War I, he trained at Plattsville Camp and became a captain in the infantry. In August 1917, he was assigned to First Company of the New England Regiment to train recruits from Harvard at Plattsville. Later, he was assigned to military intelligence.

== Career ==
Foss was the president of the Haverstraw Trap Rock Corporation from 1914 to 1916. The company dealt with trap rock or crushed rock that is used in roads and construction.

From 1920 to 1943, he was vice-president Parish-Watson & Co., Inc. Located at 44 East 57th Street in New York City, Parish-Watson was an art dealer and gallery that specialized in old Chinese porcelain and pottery, as well as Persian and Mughal items. Foss became a well-known collector of oriental rugs, Persian pottery, Chinese pottery, and other items from the East. He helped many museums create their Chinese and Persian pottery collections, including The Huntington Art Gallery, the Metropolitan Museum of Art, and the National Gallery of Art. He bequeathed his personal collection of more than 100 items to the Yale University Art Gallery. Some items in that collection include a "Persian Bowl depicting an episode from Firdawsi's Shahnameh" from the late 12th–early 13th century, a "Flask with Dancer Performing Sogdian Whirl" from late 7th–early 8th century China, and a "Caparisoned Horse" from 8th century China.

In 1930, Foss followed his father as chairman of the board of the New York Trap Rock Corporation. In 1935, he was chairman of the New York State Construction Council. In that capacity, he also served on the New York State Highway Users Conference which was petitioning for better highways. In 1938, he was nominated for membership in the Chamber of Commerce of the State of New York.

In October 1941, the New York Trap Rock Corporation refinanced by releasing $3.5 million in bonds through Smith, Barney & Co. On November 29, 1948, the Department of Justice charged Foss with violating the Sherman Antitrust Act as chairman of the New York Trap Rock Corporation. Also charged were his son, Wilson P. Foss III, who was president of the company, and the vice-president, J. C. Dooley. The Department of Justice alleged that the Trap Rock Corporation had created a monopoly in New York City area, providing nearly 90% of the crushed rock in the area. At that time, the company's sales were more than $4.5 million. In May 1951, a judge ruled against the company, Foss, and Foss III in this case. As part of the consent decree ruling, the company was prohibited from enlarging its holdings for two years and from interfering with their customers use of other vendors.

== Personal ==
Foss married Mary Burns around 1914. They had three children: Mary Foss, Hugh Hill Foss, and Wilson Perkins Foss III. They lived at 155 East 72nd Street in New York City. They also owned a summer home, Conquest Farm, in Centreville, Maryland on the Eastern Shore.

In March 1932, portraits of both Foss and his wife by John Young-Hunter were included in an exhibition in Boston at the Doll and Richards gallery that was organized by Louise Whitfield Carnegie, wife of Andrew Carnegie. The exhibit was also at the American-Anderson gallery in New York City.

His father died in 1930 leaving an estate worth $30 million. Foss served as executor and inherited $275,000 in cash and Under Elms, after his mother's death in 1940. The balance of the estate was to be split evenly amongst Foss and his five siblings after his mother's death. In 1951, Under Elms underwent a zoning variance to become a nursing home run by Daniel V. Kalina and Marcus M. Brown; a condition for Foss to sell the house.

Foss was an active sportsman and member of the Triton Fish and Game Club of Canada. He belonged to the Rockland Country Club, the Saint Nicholas Society of the City of New York, the Union Club of the City of New York, The Yale Club of New York City, and the Yeaman's Hall Club. He was also a 32nd degree Mason. In 1935, he was first vice president of The Hill School Alumni Association. He compiled The Camper's Guide to Quebec "Bush" French which was published by the Triton Club in 1957.

In 1957, he died at the age of 66 from cancer at the Memorial Hospital in New York City. His funeral was held at St. James Episcopal Church on Madison Avenue in New York City.
