= Rockland County, New York =

County in New York, United States

- County
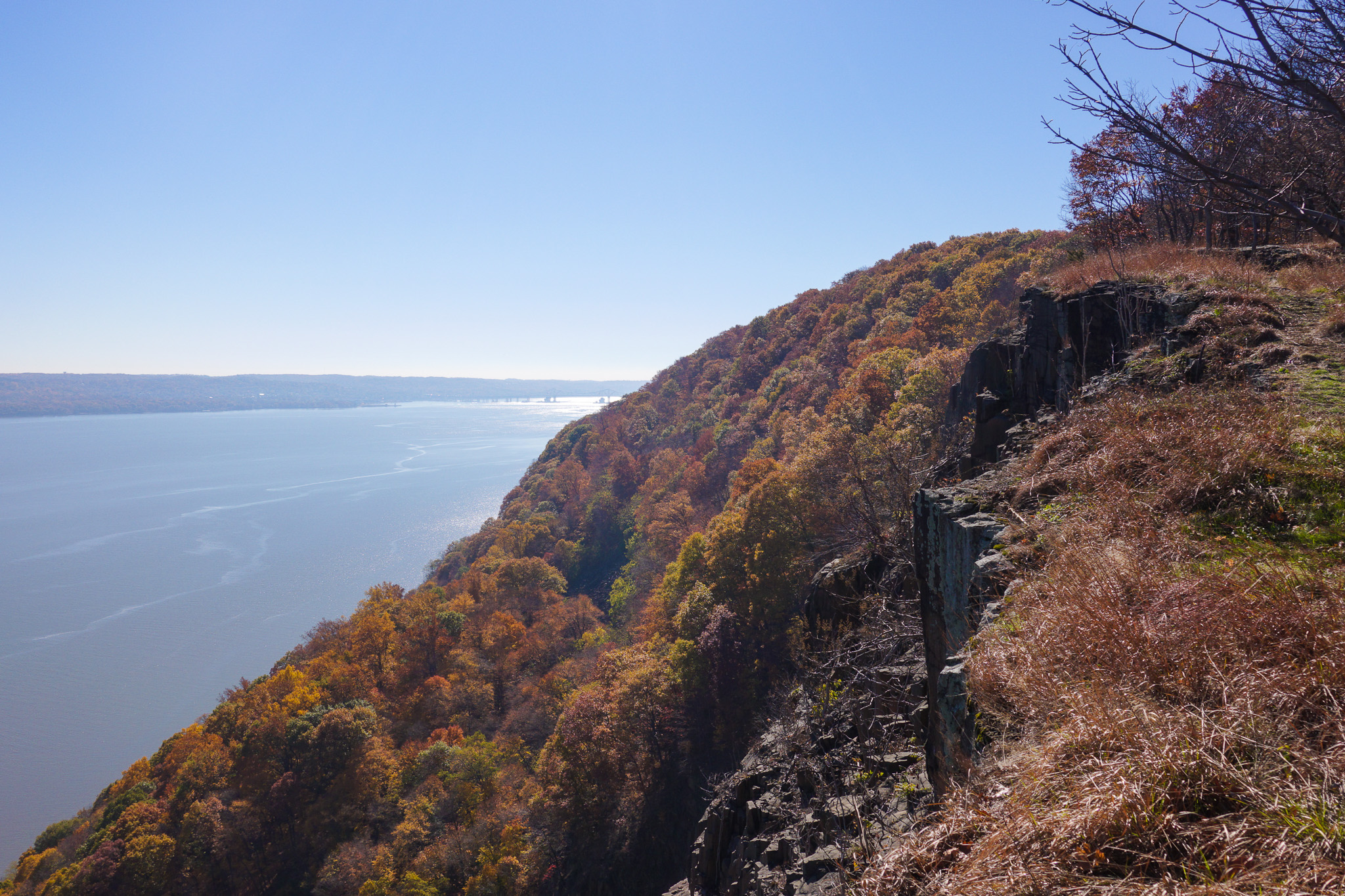
- The Hudson River looking southward from Hook Mountain State Park

- Flag Seal

- Location within the U.S. state of New York
- Coordinates: 41.15°N 74.03°W
- Country: United States
- State: New York
- Founded: February 23, 1798; 228 years ago
- Named for: Its rocky terrain
- Seat: New City
- Largest town: Ramapo

Government
  - County Executive: Ed Day (R)

Area
  - Total: 199.34 sq mi (516.3 km^{2})
  - Land: 173.55 sq mi (449.5 km^{2})
  - Water: 25.79 sq mi (66.8 km^{2}) 13%

Population (2020)
  - Total: 338,329
  - Estimate (2025): 357,397 ▲
  - Density: 2,060/sq mi (800/km^{2})
- Time zone: UTC−5 (Eastern)
  - Summer (DST): UTC−4 (EDT)
- Area code: 845
- Congressional district: 17th
- Website: rocklandcountyny.gov

Interactive map of Rockland County, New York

Rockland County is the southernmost county on the west side of the Hudson River in the U.S. state of New York. It is part of the New York metropolitan area. As of the 2020 U.S. census, the county's population is 338,329, making it the state's third-most densely populated county outside New York City after Nassau and neighboring Westchester counties. The county seat and largest hamlet is New City. Rockland County is accessible via both the New York State Thruway, which crosses the Hudson River to Westchester via the Tappan Zee Bridge over the Tappan Zee, ten exits up from the NYC border; and the Palisades Parkway, four exits up, via the George Washington Bridge. The county's name derives from "rocky land", as the area has been aptly described, largely due to the Hudson River Palisades. The county is part of the Hudson Valley region of the state.

Rockland County is the smallest county by area in New York outside New York City. It comprises five towns, eighteen incorporated villages, eighteen census-designated places, eight hamlets and eleven defunct communities. Rockland County is designated as a Preserve America Community, and nearly a third of the county's area is parkland. The county has the largest Jewish population percentage of any U.S. county, at 31.4%, or 90,000 residents. Rockland also ranked 80th on the list of highest-income counties by median household income in the United States, with a median household income of $82,534 according to the 2010 census.

== History ==
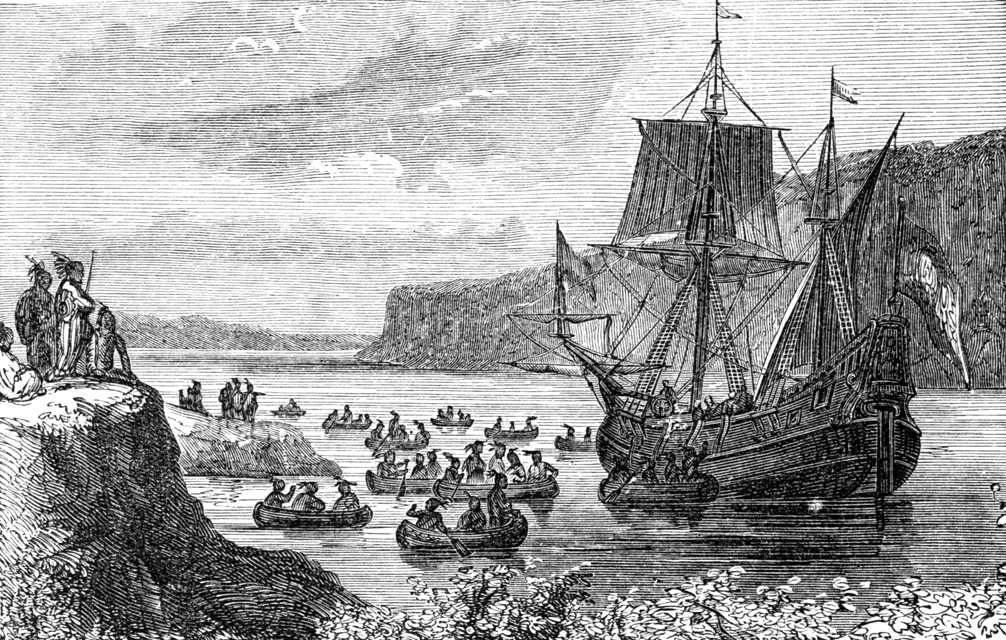
Henry Hudson's Halve Maen (Half Moon) on the Hudson River

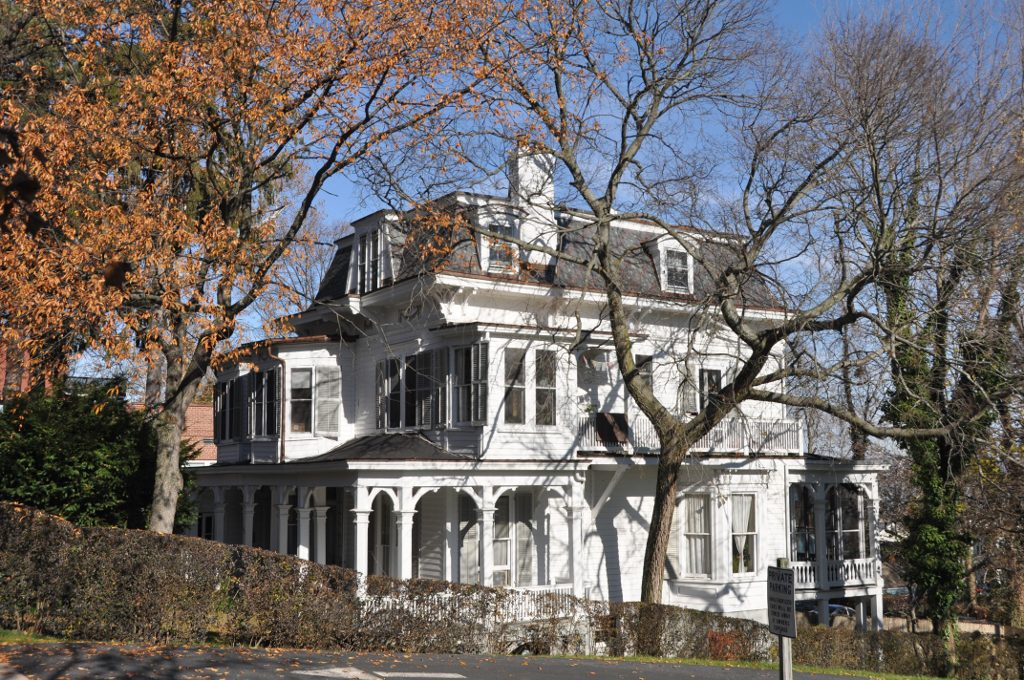
The Carson McCullers House in South Nyack

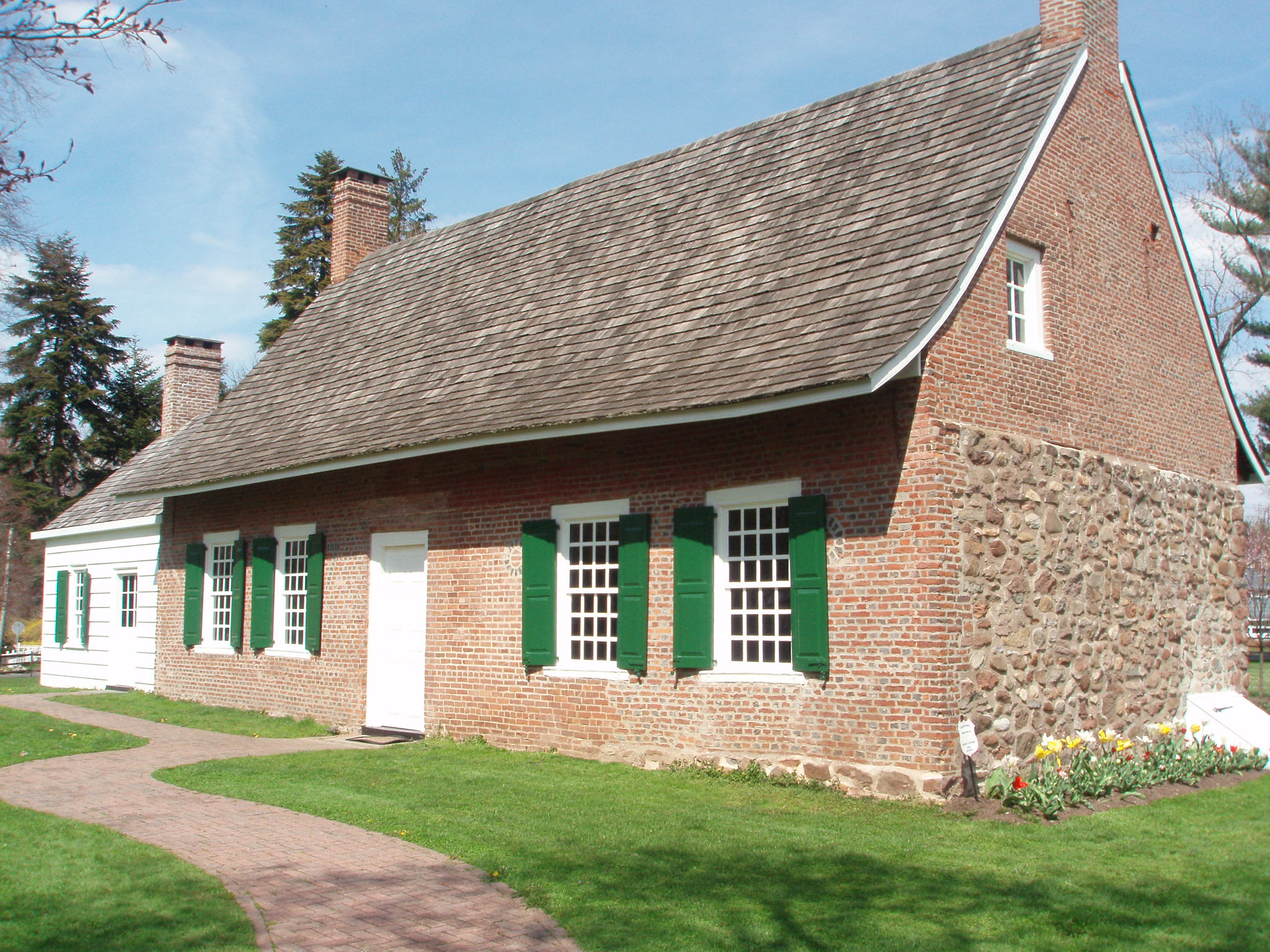
DeWint House (circa 1700) is the oldest home in Rockland County.

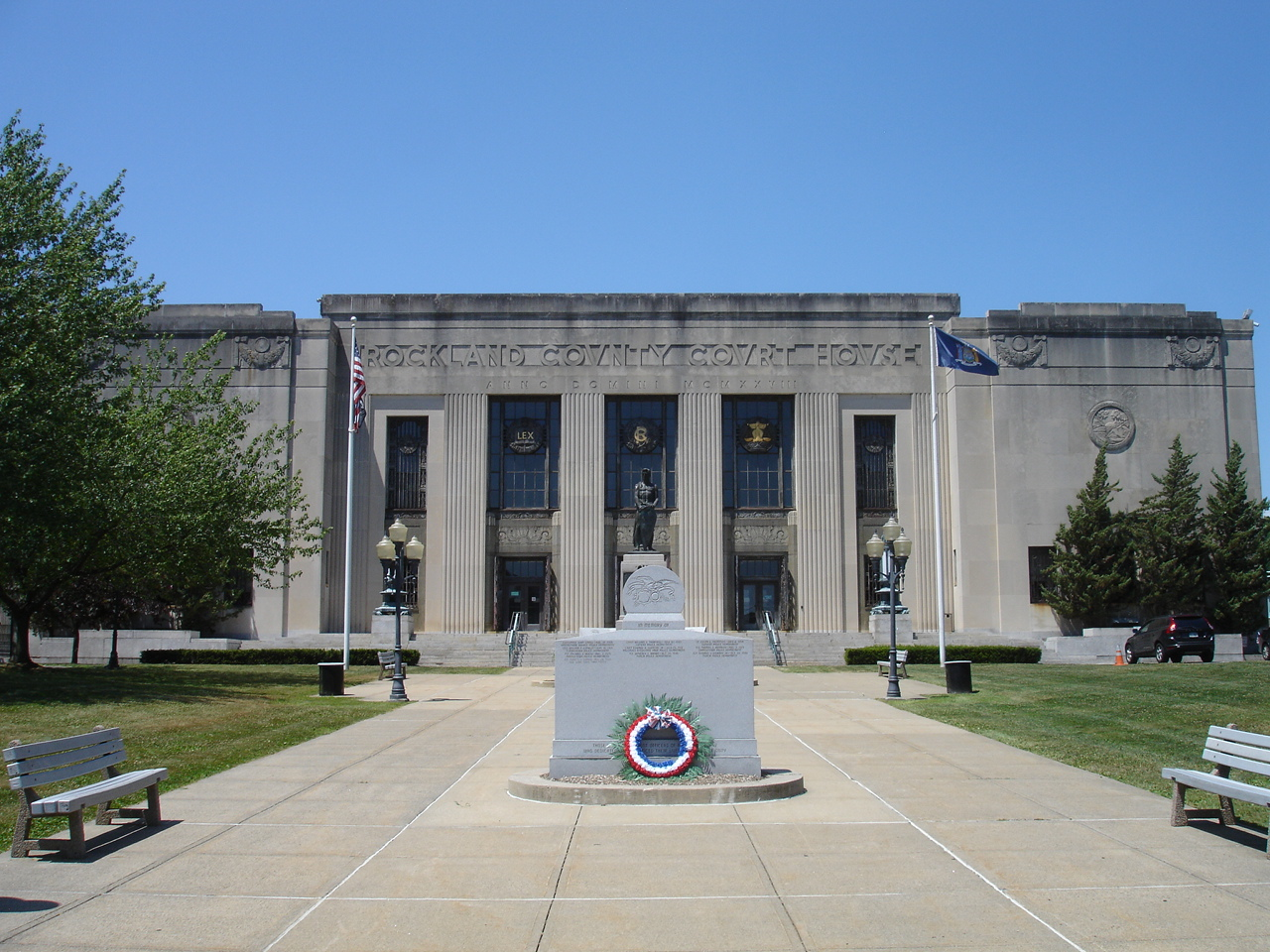
Historic Rockland County Courthouse in New City

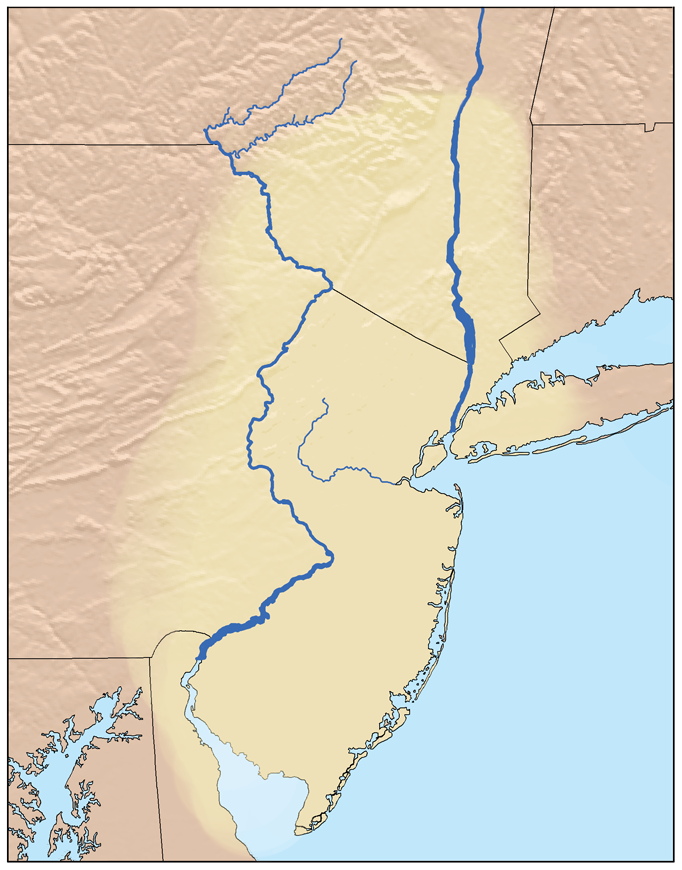
The territory of the Lenape in present-day southern New York, New Jersey, and eastern sections of Delaware and Pennsylvania

The area that became Rockland County was originally inhabited by Algonquian-speaking Native Americans, including Munsees and Lenape. The Tappan tribe had a particularly noteworthy presence in the area, extending from present-day Nyack, south to Sparkill and Tappan, down the Hackensack River valley through present-day Bergen County, New Jersey, and also along the Palisades and Hudson River shore all the way to present-day Edgewater, New Jersey.

In 1609, Henry Hudson was the first major English explorer to arrive in the area. Hudson, thinking he had found the legendary "Northwest Passage", sailed on the Half Moon up the river that would one day bear his name, and sailing through present-day Haverstraw before exploring north in present-day Albany.

In the years before 1664 when the area was formally a Dutch colony called New Netherland, present-day Rockland did not have formal European settlements. However, individuals did explore the area and made transactions with Tappan tribe for land with the idea that it could have future use. For example, in 1640, Dutch Captain David Pietersz. de Vries purchased from natives the area where the Sparkill Creek flows into the Hudson River.

In 1664, the British Crown assumed control of New Netherland from the Dutch. In June 1664, the Berkeley-Carteret land grant established the colony of New Jersey, dividing present-day Rockland and Bergen Counties into separate political areas. The northern border of New Jersey was placed in a straight line from the Delaware River at present-day Port Jervis to the Hudson River at 41 degrees even North latitude, where the Palisades Cliffs pause and give way to Sneden's Landing in Orangetown. The state line remains there to this day, though various disagreements along the exact border were had over the years.

In the 1670s, permanent Dutch settlers began to arrive with land grants, starting with the Tappan area. These settlers were eager to escape "city life", moving from Manhattan to Rockland. A number of unique, Dutch-style red sandstone houses still stand, and many place names in the county reveal their Dutch origin.

In 1683, when the Duke of York (who became King James II of England) established the first 12 counties of New York, present-day Rockland County was part of Orange County, known then as "Orange County South of the Mountains". Orangetown was created at the same time under a royal grant, originally encompassing all of modern Rockland County. Around this time, as the English began to colonize Nyack and Tappan, the Native Americans began to leave Rockland in search of undisturbed land further north.

The natural barrier of the Ramapo Mountains and the size of the county made carrying out governmental activities difficult. At one point, two governments were active, one on each side of the Ramapo Mountains, so Rockland split off from Orange in 1798 to form its own county. That same year, the county seat was transferred from Tappan to New City, where a new courthouse was built.

Haverstraw was separated from Orangetown in 1719, and became a town in 1788; it included the present-day Clarkstown, Ramapo, and Stony Point. Clarkstown and Ramapo became towns in 1791, followed by Stony Point in 1865.

During the American Revolution, when control of the Hudson River was viewed by the British as strategic to dominating the American territories, Rockland saw skirmishes at Haverstraw, Nyack, and Piermont, and significant military engagements at the Battle of Stony Point, where General "Mad" Anthony Wayne earned his nickname. George Washington had headquarters for a time at John Suffern's tavern, the later site of the village of Suffern. British Major John André met with American traitor Benedict Arnold near Stony Point to buy the plans for the fortifications at West Point. André was captured with the plans in Tarrytown on his way back to the British lines; he was brought to Tappan for trial in the Tappan church, found guilty, hanged, and buried nearby. Yet another important chapter in the story of the Revolution was written on May 5, 1783, when General Washington received Sir Guy Carleton at the DeWint House, where they discussed terms of a peace treaty. Two days later, Washington visited Sir Guy aboard a British war vessel, H.M.S Perseverance, laying anchor in the Hudson. On this day, the king's navy fired its first salute to the flag of the United States of America.

In the decades following the Revolution, Rockland became popular for its stone and brick manufactories. Many buildings in New York City were built with bricks made in Rockland. These products, however, required quarrying in land that many later believed should be set aside as a preserve. Many unsuccessful efforts were made to turn much of the Hudson Highlands on the northern tip of the county into a forest preserve. Union Pacific Railroad president E. H. Harriman, though, donated land and large sums of money for the purchase of properties in the area of Bear Mountain. Bear Mountain/Harriman State Park became a reality in 1910 when Harriman's widow donated his lands to the state, and by 1914, more than an estimated one million people a year were coming to the park. After World War I, Rockland County became the most important sausage-making hub in New York.

In 1911, Letchworth Village, an institution for the mentally disabled opened in Rockland County near Thiells. The institution gained national infamy in 1972, when an investigation by Geraldo Rivera revealed the patients there to have been housed in neglectful conditions. Letchworth closed in 1996.

Rockland remained semi-rural until the 1950s, when the Palisades Interstate Parkway, Tappan Zee Bridge, New York State Thruway, and other major transit arteries were built. In the decades that followed, the county became a maturely developed suburb of New York City. As people moved up from the five boroughs (particularly the Bronx in the early years), the population flourished from 89,276 in 1950 to 338,329 in 2020.

== Geography ==
Rockland County lies just north of the New Jersey-New York border, west of Westchester County (across the Hudson River), and south of Orange County. Its east border is formed by the Tappan Zee portion of the Hudson River. The county's terrain ranges from 1,283 ft (391 m) ASL on Rockhouse Mountain (northwest of Lake Welch) to approaching sea level along the Hudson River. According to the US Census Bureau, the county has a total area of 199.34 mi^{2} (516.3 km^{2}), of which 173.55 mi^{2} (449.5 km^{2}) are land and 25.79 sqmi (66.80 km^{2}) (13%) are covered by water. It is the state's smallest county outside the five boroughs of New York City.

About 30% of Rockland County is devoted to parkland, belonging to either the five towns, incorporated villages, the state, or the county. These parks provide walking and hiking trails, ballfields, dog runs, historic sites, ponds, streams, salt marshes, and equestrian trails. Some popular state parks include Bear Mountain State Park on the northernmost tip of the county, Harriman State Park, also along the county's northern boundary, and Nyack Beach State Park along the Hudson River, with trails connecting to Rockland Lake State Park. The county hosts numerous public and private golf courses, with the towns of Orangetown, Ramapo, Stony Point, and Haverstraw all operating public golf courses within their towns. The Palisades Interstate Park Commission operates two golf courses in Rockland Lake State Park. Notable private courses in the county include Paramount Country Club, Manhattan Woods Golf Course (designed by PGA great Gary Player), and Rockland Country Club (Sparkill).

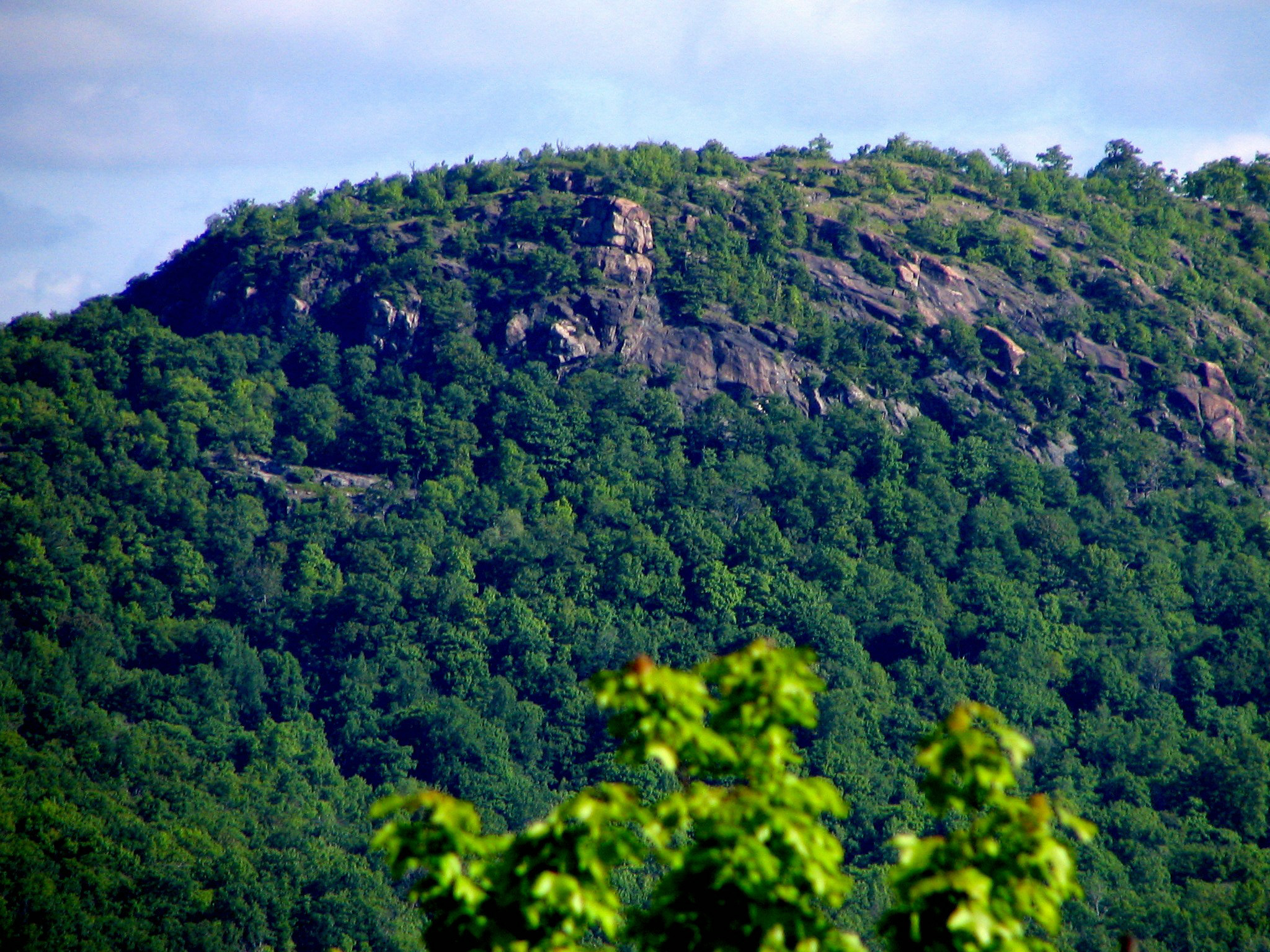
Ramapo Torne in Harriman State Park, part of the Ramapo Mountains

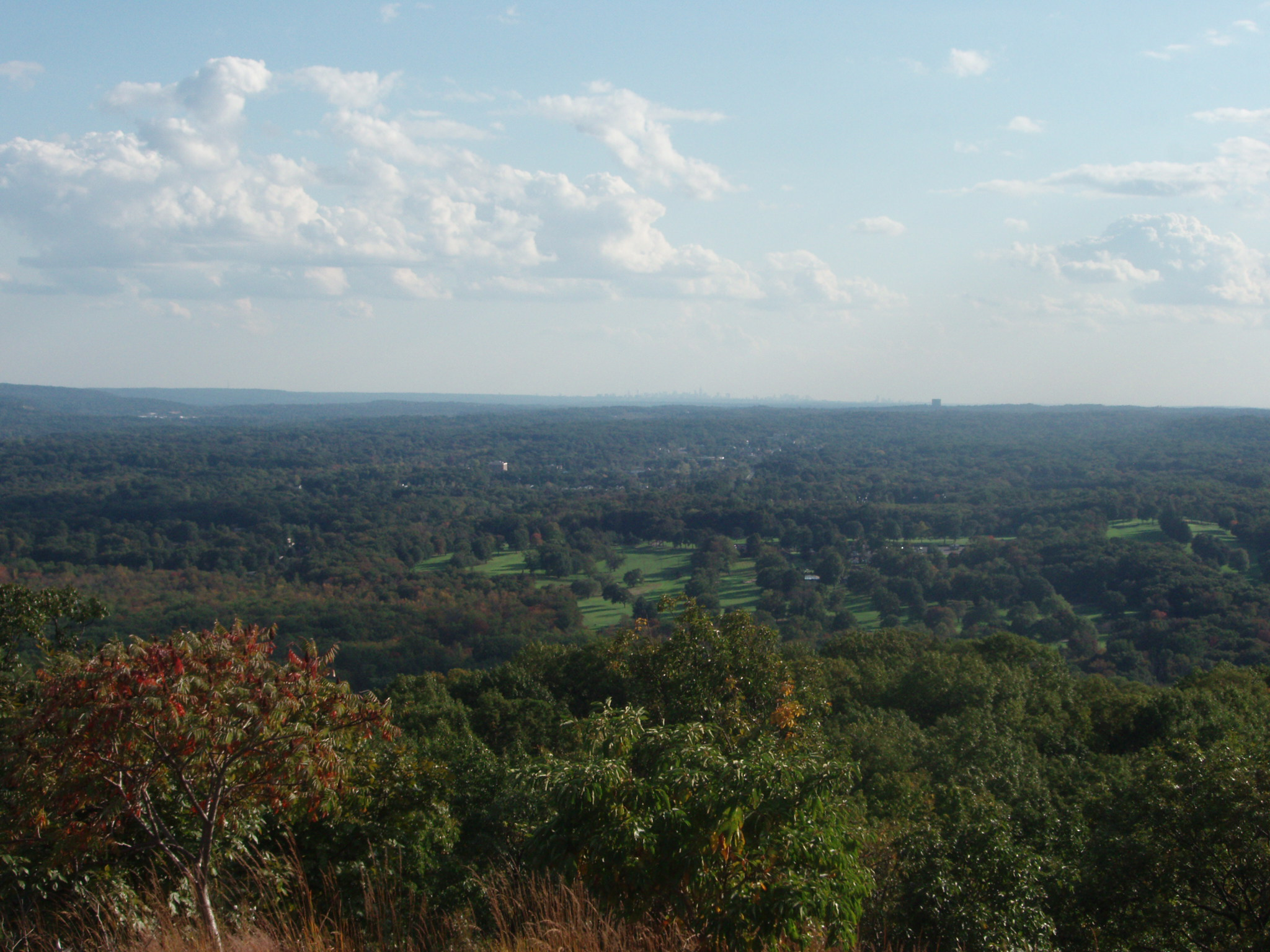
Overlooking Rockland County with NYC skyline in far background

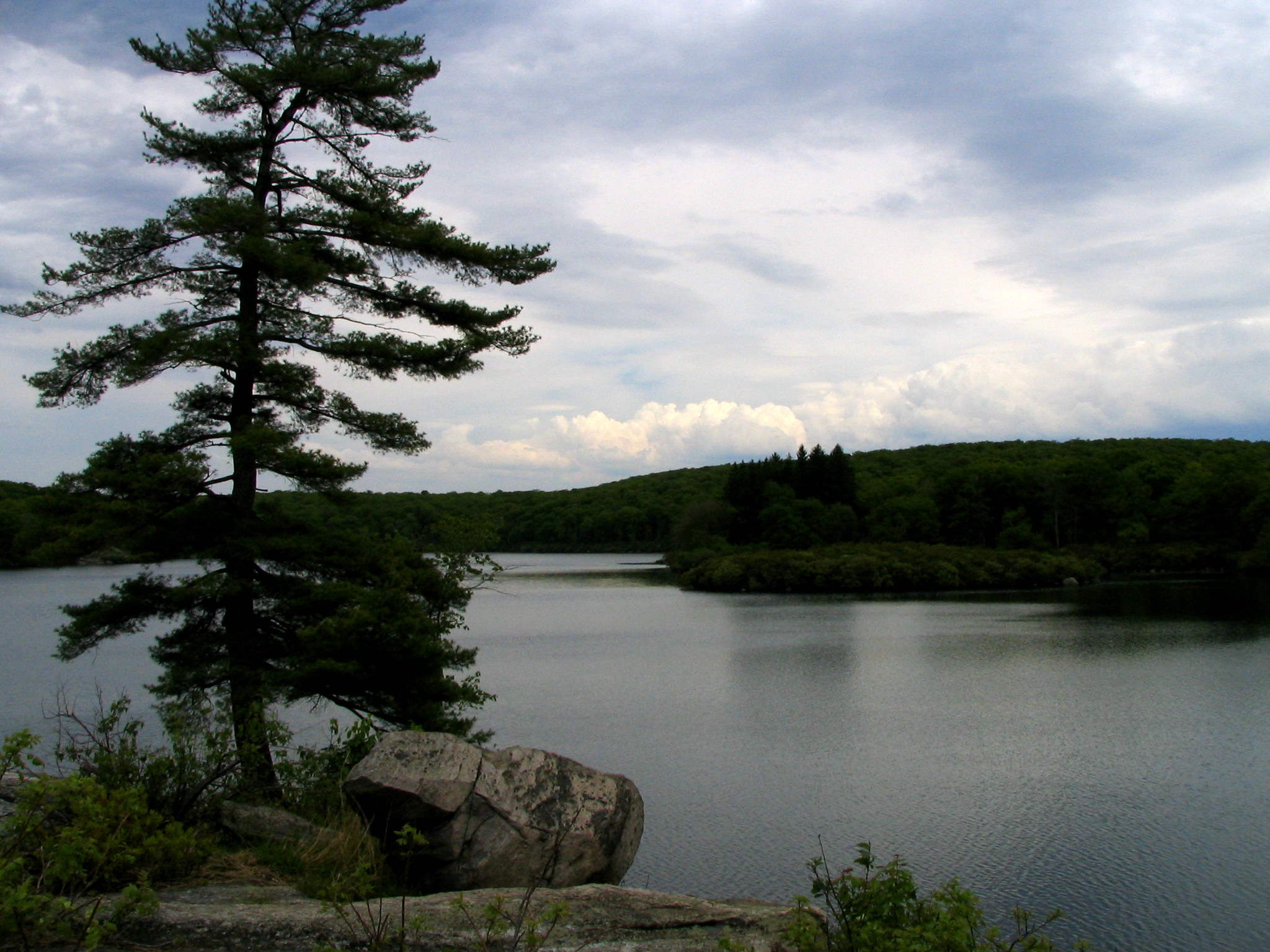
Pine Meadow Lake in Harriman State Park

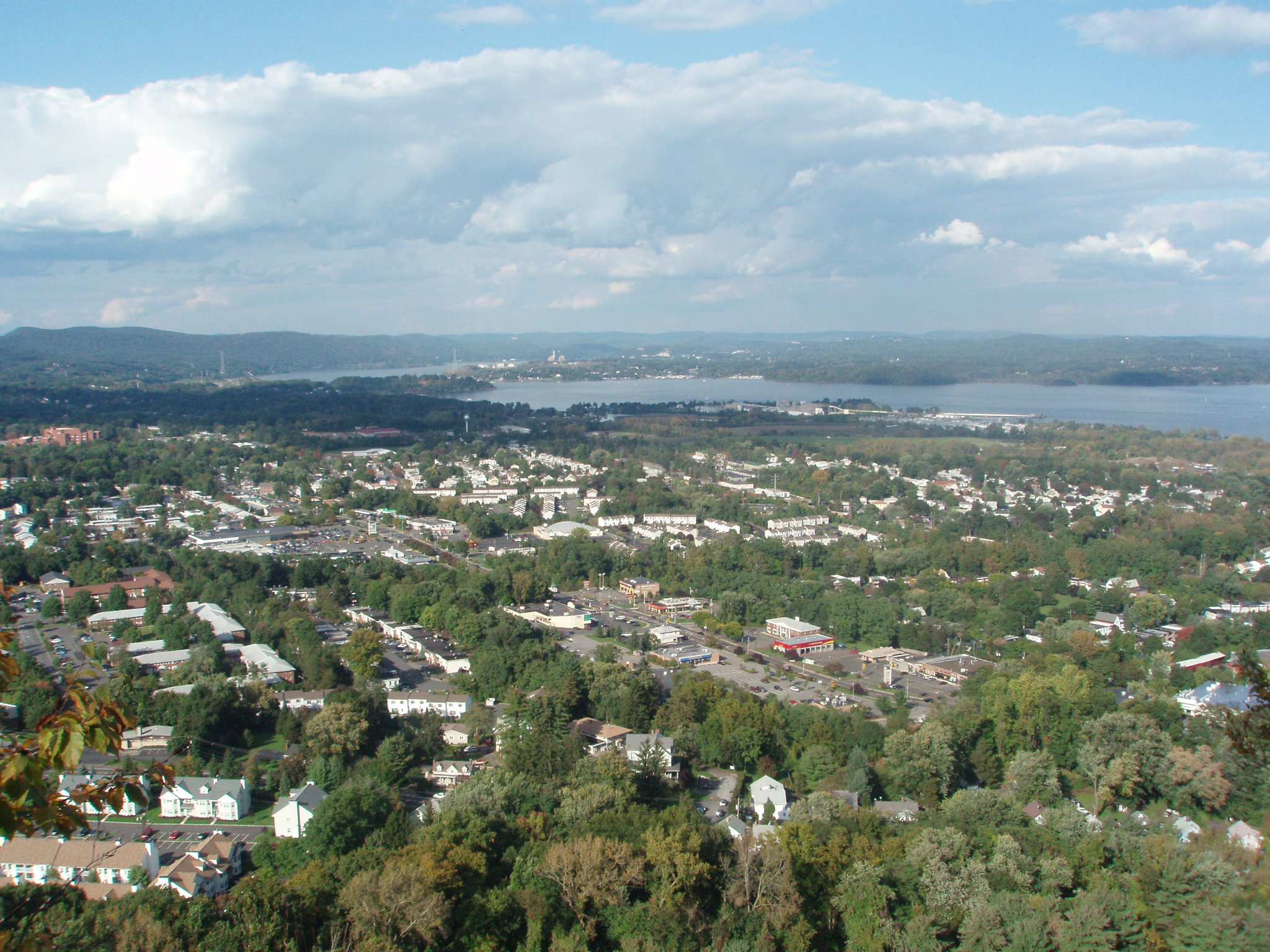
Haverstraw along the Hudson River

=== Adjacent counties ===
- Orange County - northwest
- Putnam County - northeast
- Westchester County - east
- Passaic County, New Jersey - west
- Bergen County, New Jersey - south

=== Lakes ===
- Breakneck Pond
- Congers Lake
- Cranberry Pond
- Lake DeForest
- Lake Sebago
- Lake Tappan (part)
- Lake Wanoksink
- Pine Meadow Lake
- Potake Lake (part)
- Rockland Lake
- Second Reservoir
- Lake Welch
- Tappan Zee (along east border)
- Third Reservoir
- Antrim Lake

=== Climate ===
Climate data for New City, NY (1991-2020 Averages)
Month	Jan	Feb	Mar	Apr	May	Jun	Jul	Aug	Sep	Oct	Nov	Dec	Year
Mean daily maximum °F (°C)	37.4 (3.0)	40.7 (4.8)	48.5 (9.2)	61 (16)	71.1 (21.7)	79.6 (26.4)	84.5 (29.2)	82.7 (28.2)	76.1 (24.5)	64.1 (17.8)	53 (12)	42.6 (5.9)	61.8 (16.6)
Mean daily minimum °F (°C)	20.9 (−6.2)	22.6 (−5.2)	29.7 (−1.3)	40.2 (4.6)	49.9 (9.9)	59.2 (15.1)	64.3 (17.9)	62.7 (17.1)	55.4 (13.0)	44 (7)	34.5 (1.4)	27.2 (−2.7)	42.6 (5.9)
Average precipitation inches (mm)	3.59 (91)	2.69 (68)	4.09 (104)	3.92 (100)	3.72 (94)	4.76 (121)	4.32 (110)	4.81 (122)	4.45 (113)	4.44 (113)	3.84 (98)	4.19 (106)	48.82 (1,240)
Average dew point °F (°C)	19.5 (−6.9)	19.9 (−6.7)	25.5 (−3.6)	35.6 (2.0)	47.7 (8.7)	58.3 (14.6)	63.6 (17.6)	62.9 (17.2)	56.7 (13.7)	45.3 (7.4)	33.6 (0.9)	25.9 (−3.4)	41.2 (5.1)
Mean daily daylight hours	9.6	10.7	12	13.4	14.5	15.1	14.8	13.8	12.5	11.1	9.9	9.3	12.2
Source 1: PRISM
Source 2: weather-us.com

== Demographics ==
Historical population
Census	Pop.	Note	%±
1800	6,353		—
1810	7,758		22.1%
1820	8,837		13.9%
1830	9,388		6.2%
1840	11,975		27.6%
1850	16,962		41.6%
1860	22,492		32.6%
1870	25,213		12.1%
1880	27,690		9.8%
1890	35,162		27.0%
1900	38,298		8.9%
1910	46,873		22.4%
1920	45,548		−2.8%
1930	59,599		30.8%
1940	74,261		24.6%
1950	89,276		20.2%
1960	136,803		53.2%
1970	229,903		68.1%
1980	259,530		12.9%
1990	265,475		2.3%
2000	286,753		8.0%
2010	311,687		8.7%
2020	338,329		8.5%
2025 (est.)	357,397	▲	5.6%

=== 2020 census ===
Rockland County, New York – Racial and ethnic composition Note: the US Census treats Hispanic/Latino as an ethnic category. This table excludes Latinos from the racial categories and assigns them to a separate category. Hispanics/Latinos may be of any race.
Race / Ethnicity (NH = Non-Hispanic)	Pop 1980	Pop 1990	Pop 2000	Pop 2010	Pop 2020	% 1980	% 1990	% 2000	% 2010	% 2020
White alone (NH)	224,529	212,066	205,653	203,670	206,113	86.51%	79.88%	71.72%	65.34%	60.92%
Black or African American alone (NH)	17,457	24,352	30,139	34,623	33,775	6.73%	9.17%	10.51%	11.11%	9.98%
Native American or Alaska Native alone (NH)	556	551	489	487	390	0.21%	0.21%	0.17%	0.16%	0.12%
Asian alone (NH)	4,301	10,511	15,707	19,099	20,413	1.66%	3.96%	5.48%	6.13%	6.03%
Native Hawaiian or Pacific Islander alone (NH)	x	x	90	43	42	x	x	0.03%	0.01%	0.01%
Other race alone (NH)	915	284	521	609	3,445	0.35%	0.11%	0.18%	0.20%	1.02%
Mixed race or Multiracial (NH)	x	x	4,972	4,373	7,700	x	x	1.73%	1.40%	2.28%
Hispanic or Latino (any race)	11,772	17,711	29,182	48,783	66,451	4.54%	6.67%	10.18%	15.65%	19.64%
Total	259,530	265,475	286,753	311,687	338,329	100.00%	100.00%	100.00%	100.00%	100.00%

As of the 2020 United States census, 338,329 people and 100,438 households were residing in the county. The population density was 1,950 people per square mile (750 people/km^{2}). The 107,002 housing units averaged 617 units per square mile (238/km^{2}).

=== 2010 census ===
Of the 107,002 households, 38% had children under the age of 18 living with them, 63% were married couples living together, 10% had a female householder with no husband present, and 23% were not families. Around 19% of households were made up of individuals, and 8% had someone living alone who was 65 or older. The average household size was 3.0 and the average family size was 3.5.

The county's age distribution was 28.4% under 18, 8% from 18 to 24, 28% from 25 to 44, 24.30% from 45 to 64, and 12% who were 65 or older. The median age was 36 years. For every 100 women, there were 95 men. For every 100 women age 18 and over, there were 91 men.

The median income for a household was $93,024 and for a family was $80,000. Males had a median income of $58,000 versus $39,000 for females. The per capita income for the county was $39,286. The mean, or average, income for a family in Rockland County is $73,500 according to the 2004 census. About 6% of families and 12.5% of the population were below the poverty line, including 14% of those under age 18 and 8% of those age 65 or over.

=== 2000 census ===
As of the 2000 United States census, 286,753 people, 92,675 households, and 70,989 families were residing in the county. The population density was 1,652 people per square mile (638 people/km^{2}). The 94,973 housing units averaged 547 units per square mile (211/km^{2}). Residents live closer together than the census numbers indicate, as 30% of the county is reserved as parkland. About 9% of residents reported speaking Spanish at home, 5% Yiddish, 3% French-based creole, 1.5% Italian, 1.3% Tagalog, 1.3% Hebrew, 1.2% French, and 1% Russian. Other languages spoken at home by at least 1000 people include Malayalam, Korean, Chinese, German, and Polish.

=== Orthodox Jewish community ===
As of 2017, the Orthodox Jewish and Hasidic Jewish communities formed about 15 percent of the population of Rockland County.

== Education ==
Blue ribbon School Logo

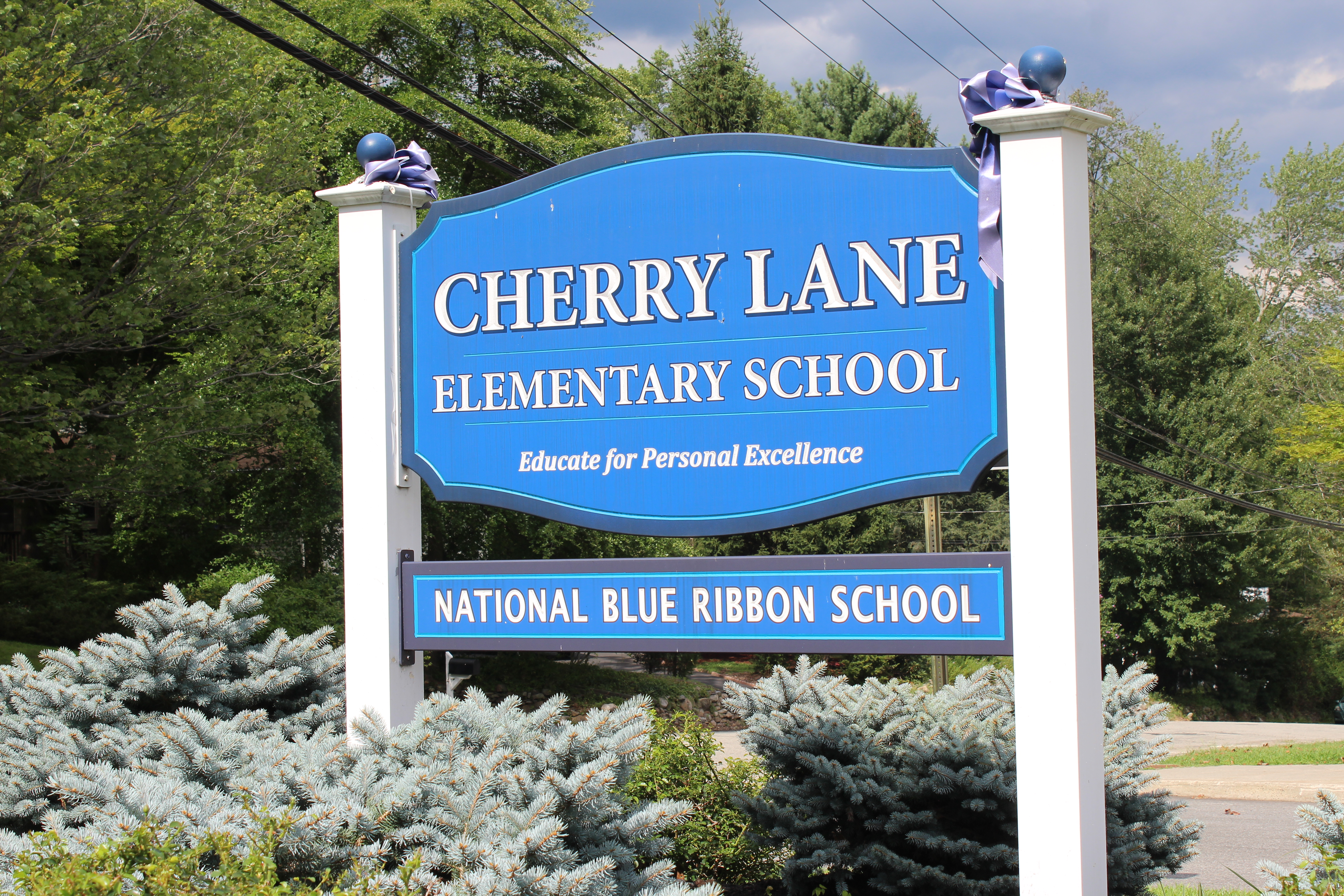
Cherry Lane Elementary School

The county is home to several Blue Ribbon School of Excellence Award winners, awarded by the U.S. Department of Education:

- In 2000–2001, Liberty Elementary School in Valley Cottage (semi-finalists in 2004)
- In 2007, Strawtown Elementary School in West Nyack
- In 2008 & 2014, Franklin Avenue Elementary School in Pearl River
- In 2009, George W. Miller Elementary School in Nanuet
- In 2011, Pearl River Middle School in Pearl River
- In 2013, Cherry Lane Elementary School in Airmont
- In 2016, Nanuet Senior High School In Nanuet
- In 2018, Clarkstown High School South
- In 2022, Nanuet Senior High School In Nanuet

=== School districts ===
School districts include:

- Clarkstown Central School District
- East Ramapo Central School District
- Nanuet Union Free School District
- North Rockland Central School District (Haverstraw-Stony Point)
- Nyack Public Schools
- Pearl River Union Free School District
- South Orangetown Central School District
- Suffern Central School District (formerly the Ramapo Central School District)

=== Colleges and universities ===
The county is home to several colleges and universities:

- Beth Medrash Elyon
- Dominican University New York - Orangeburg
- Long Island University extension site at Rockland Community College - Suffern
- Columbia University's Lamont–Doherty Earth Observatory
- Rabbinical College Beth Shraga - Monsey, NY
- Rockland Community College - Suffern, NY
- St. Thomas Aquinas College - Sparkill, NY
- Yeshiva D'Monsey Rabbinical College - Monsey

== Transportation ==
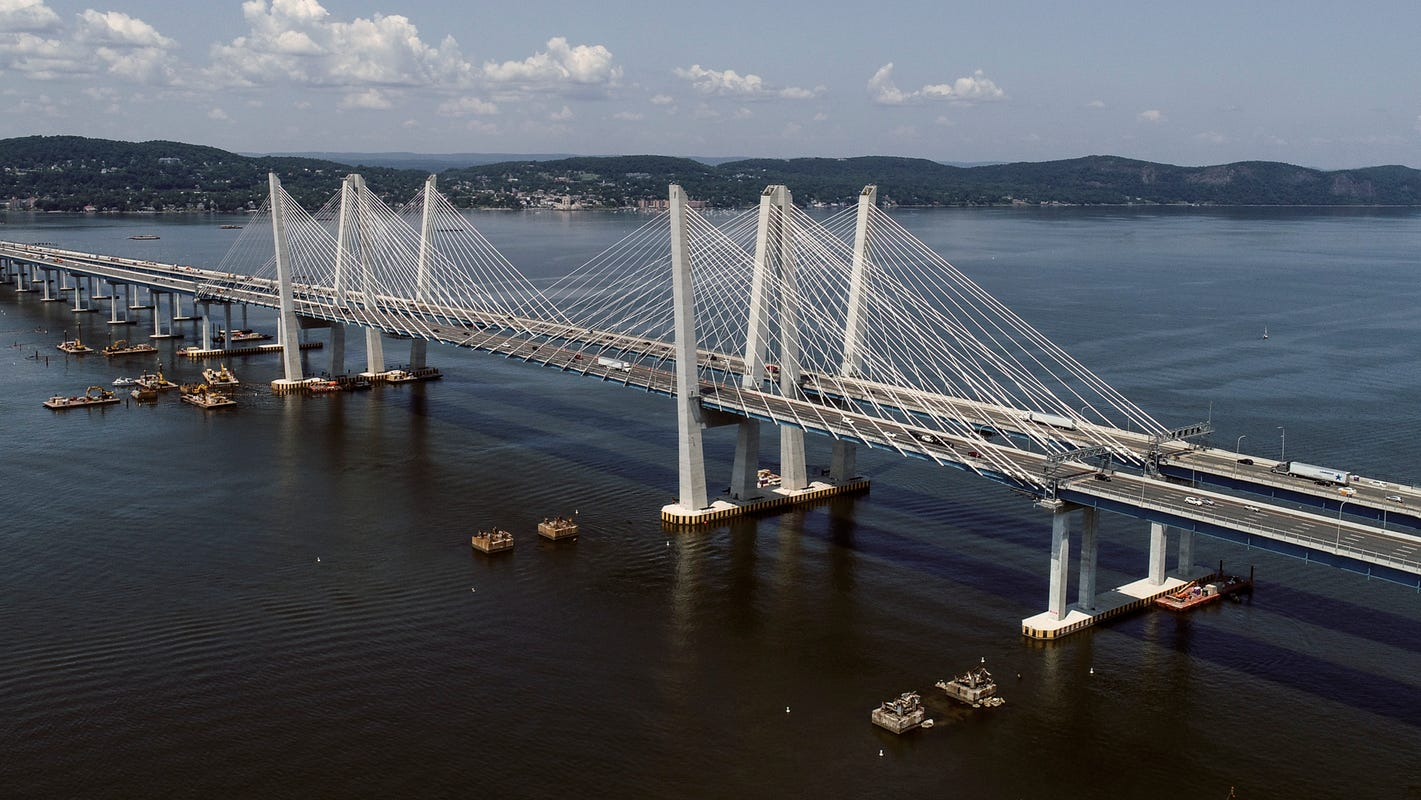
Tappan Zee Bridge

The Governor Mario M. Cuomo Bridge, commonly called the Tappan Zee Bridge, connects South Nyack in Rockland County and Tarrytown in Westchester County across the Hudson River in the Lower Hudson Valley of New York. The old bridge was replaced with a new span in 2017.

=== Major highways ===
The county is served by several major highways, including Interstate 87/287 (the New York Thruway), opening from Suffern to Yonkers in 1955. The old Tappan Zee Bridge opened the same year, connecting Rockland and Westchester, allowing Rockland County's population to grow rapidly. The Palisades Interstate Parkway, a project of master planner Robert Moses, and built between 1947 and 1958, connects the county directly to the George Washington Bridge due south. The Garden State Parkway opened in 1955, connecting New Jersey to I-87/287.

- I-87
- I-287
- US 6
- US 9W
- US 202
- Garden State Parkway
- Palisades Parkway
- NY 17
- NY 45
- NY 59 - Originated as the Nyack Turnpike
  - Korean War Veterans Memorial Highway
- NY 210
- NY 303
- NY 304
  - "Rockland County Clerk Paul Piperato Memorial Highway"
- NY 306
- NY 340

For further information

- List of county routes in Rockland County, New York
- List of county routes in Rockland County, New York (1–38)
- List of county routes in Rockland County, New York (41–75)
- List of county routes in Rockland County, New York (76–118A)

=== Bus ===
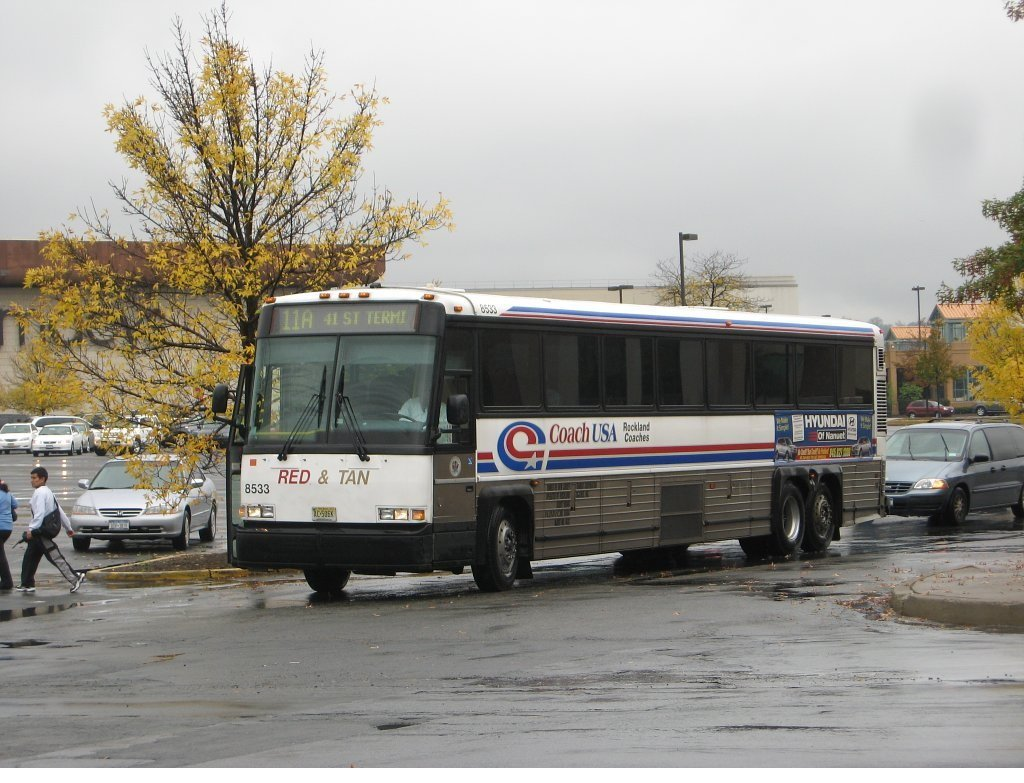
Rockland Coaches 11A bus in Nanuet

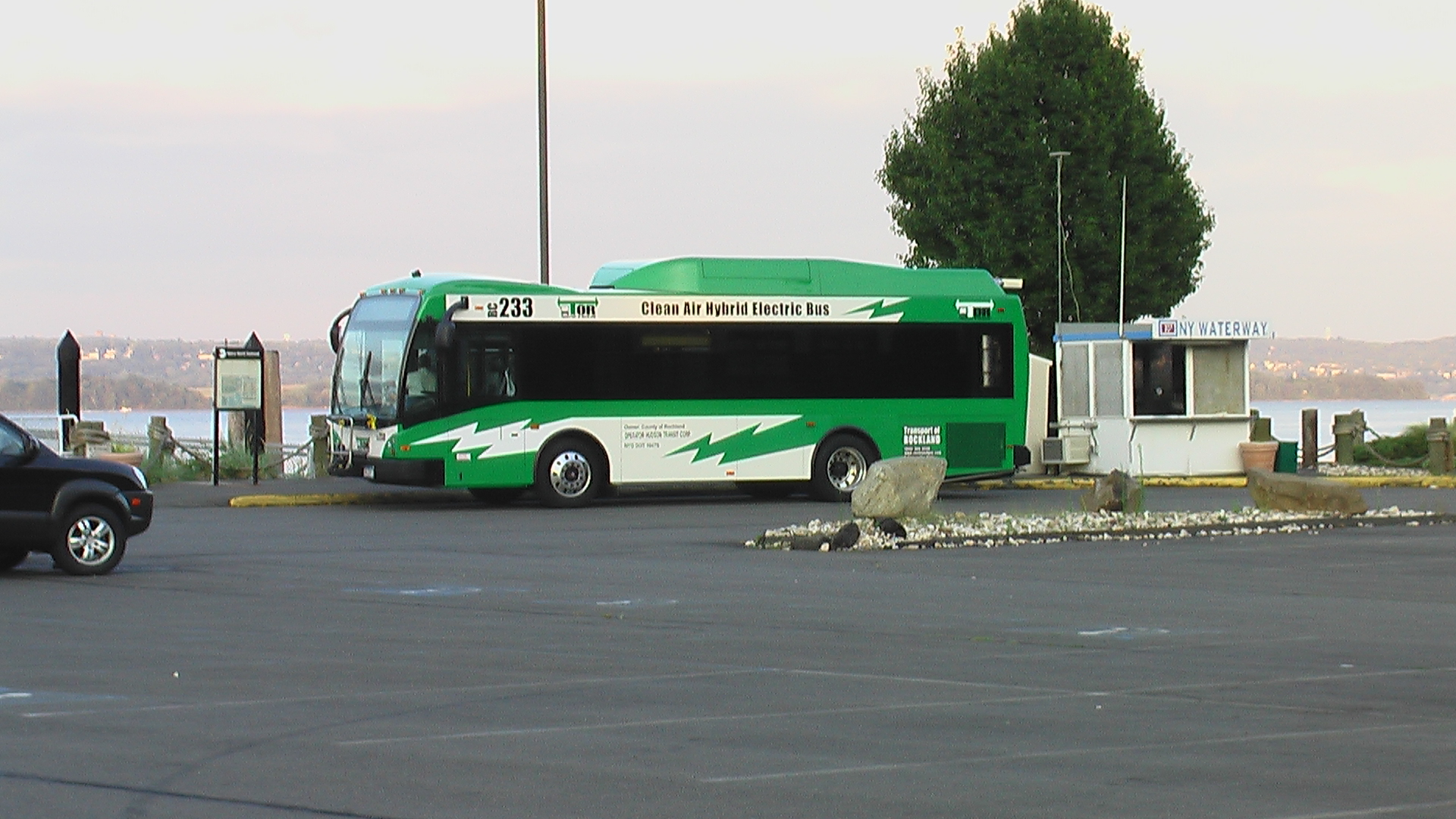
Hybrid electric bus operated by Transport of Rockland

The Transport of Rockland operates several local bus routes throughout the county, and the express bus Hudson Link routes to city centers and train stations in Tarrytown and White Plains in Westchester County. TOR provides connections to other neighborhood bus operations – Minitrans and connections to private commuter lines, Rockland Coaches and Short Line providing service to North Jersey and New York City.

Transportation map

=== Railroad ===
NJ Transit/Metro-North Railroad operates the Port Jervis Line, which stops at the Suffern Railroad Station and Sloatsburg Station, and the Pascack Valley Line, whose stops include Pearl River, Nanuet, and Spring Valley, in their respective hamlets and village of the same name. Connections on this line are available at Secaucus for service to Penn Station in Midtown Manhattan and service to the Meadowlands Sports Complex in East Rutherford, New Jersey. The southern terminus of both lines is Hoboken Terminal in New Jersey, where connections can be made to several NJ Transit bus lines, ferries, and PATH trains to New York City.

Until 1958, Rockland County's eastern side was served by the New York Central Railroad's passenger service on the West Shore Railroad from Weehawken, New Jersey, opposite midtown Manhattan up through Tappan, West Nyack, Congers, and Haverstraw, on to the West Hudson shore cities of Newburgh, Kingston, and Albany. The service ran to West Haverstraw, in the north of the until 1959. The Erie Railroad ran train service on the Northern Branch through the southeastern corner of the county to Nyack up to 1966.

=== Ferry ===
NY Waterway operates a ferry service between Haverstraw and Ossining in Westchester County for the Metropolitan Transportation Authority. Commuters take the Transport of Rockland's Ferry Express route to the Haverstraw ferry terminal for service to Metro-North's Hudson Line service to Grand Central Terminal. Ferry service is typically suspended in the colder months when the Hudson River freezes over, and commuters must take shuttle buses across the Tappan Zee Bridge.

=== Airports ===
Nearby airports include:

- New York: John F. Kennedy International Airport, LaGuardia Airport, Westchester County Airport, and Stewart International Airport
- New Jersey: Newark Liberty International Airport, Teterboro Airport

== Law, government, and politics ==
All of Rockland County falls within the 17th Congressional District, along with central and western Westchester County. The district is represented by Congressman Mike Lawler.

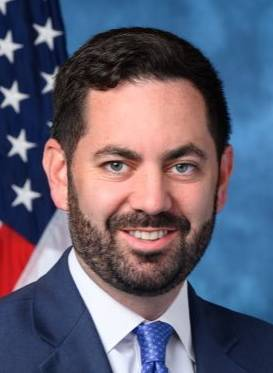
Mike Lawler

United States House of Representatives
Name	United States House of Representatives	Party
Mike Lawler	17th District	Republican

The county of Rockland is represented as follows in the New York State Senate as of 2025:

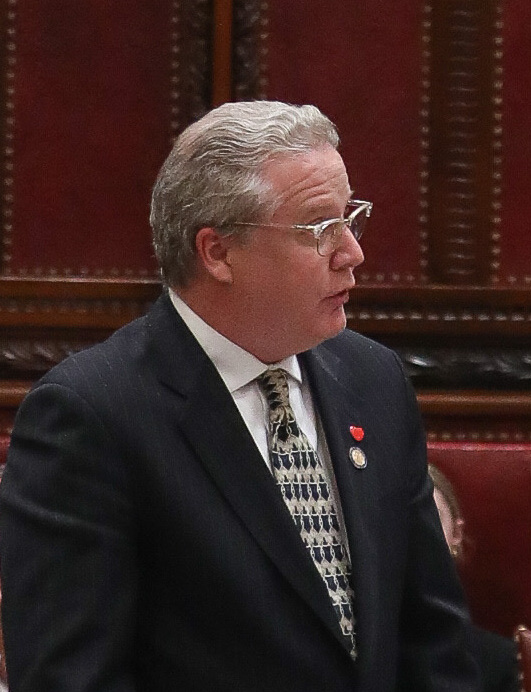
Bill Weber

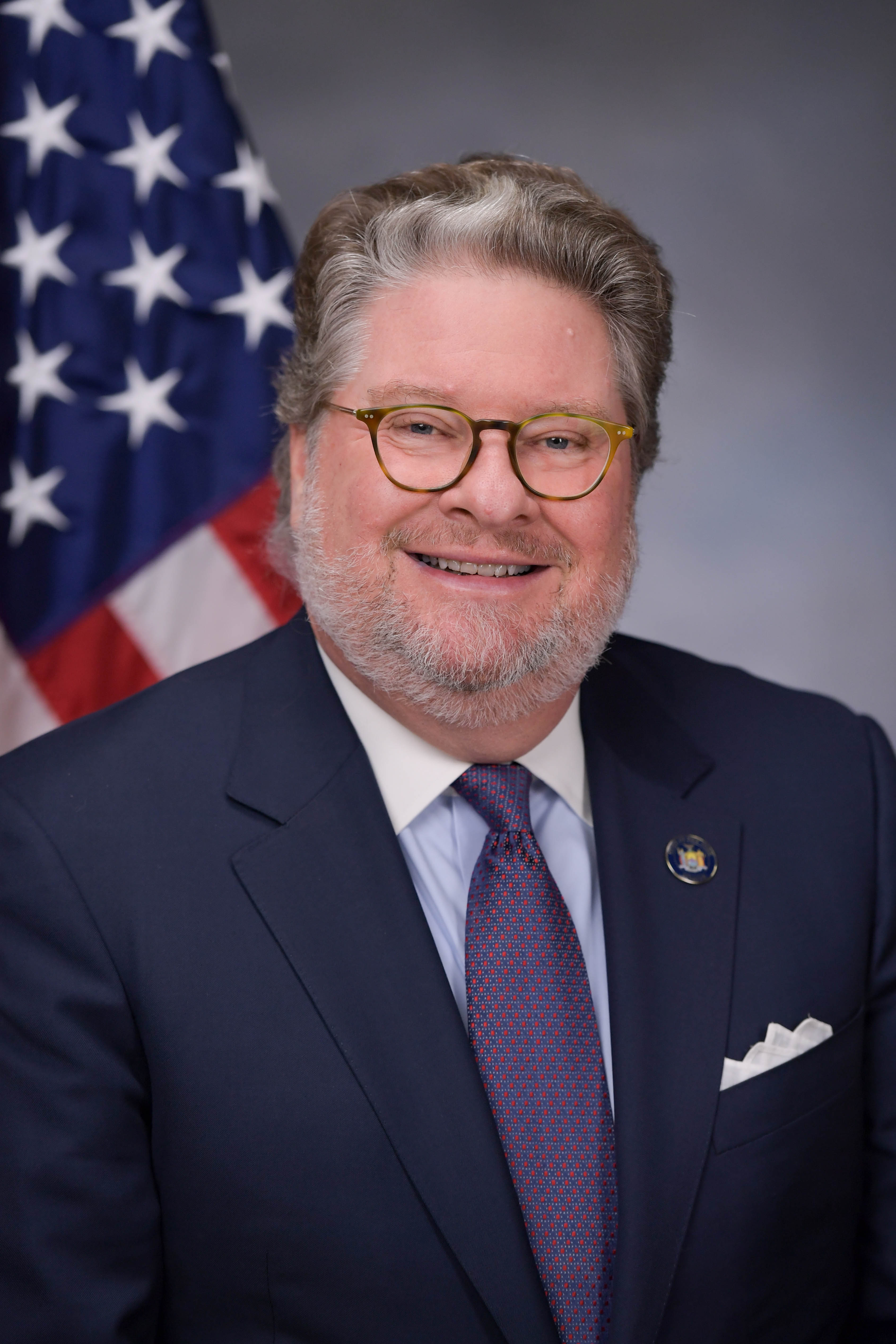
Peter Harckham

Rockland County Senate Members
Name	NYS Senate	Party
Bill Weber	38th District	Republican
Peter Harckham	40th District	Democrat

The county of Rockland is represented as follows in the New York State Assembly as of 2025:

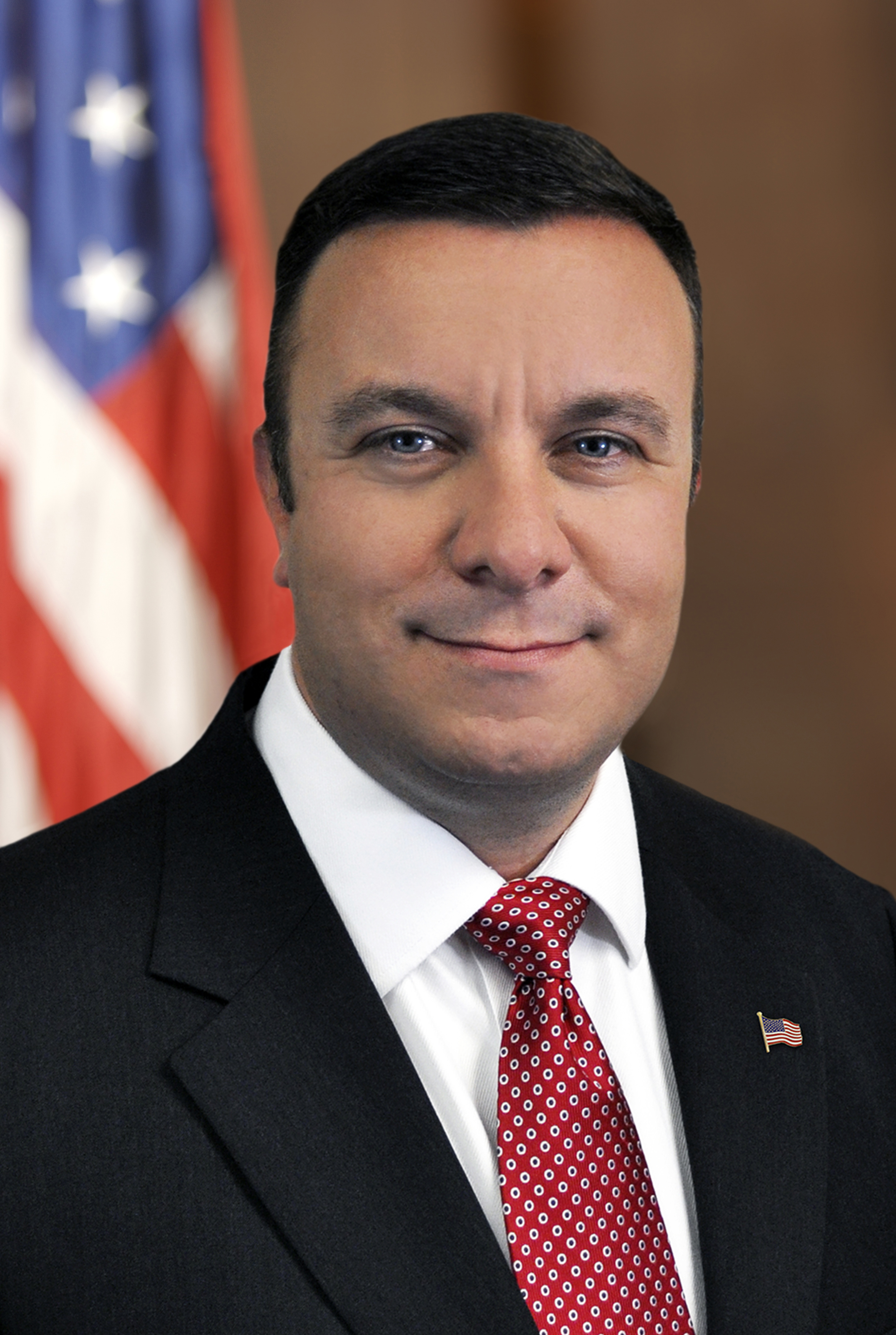
Karl Brabenec

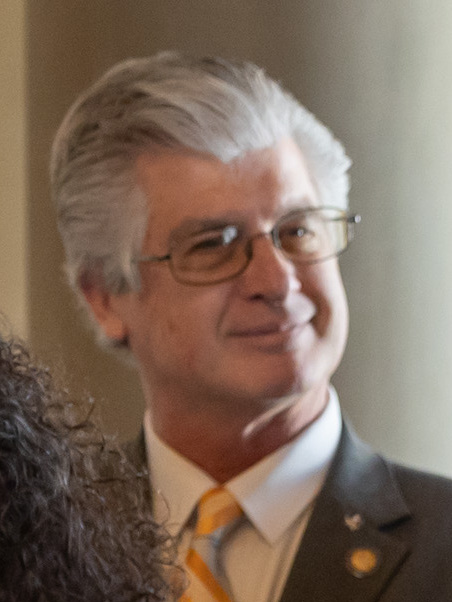
Chris Eachus

Rockland County Assembly Members
Name	NYS Assembly	Party
Patrick Carroll	96th District	Democrat
Aron Wieder	97th District	Democratic
Karl A. Brabenec	98th District	Republican
Christopher W Eachus	99th District	Democrat

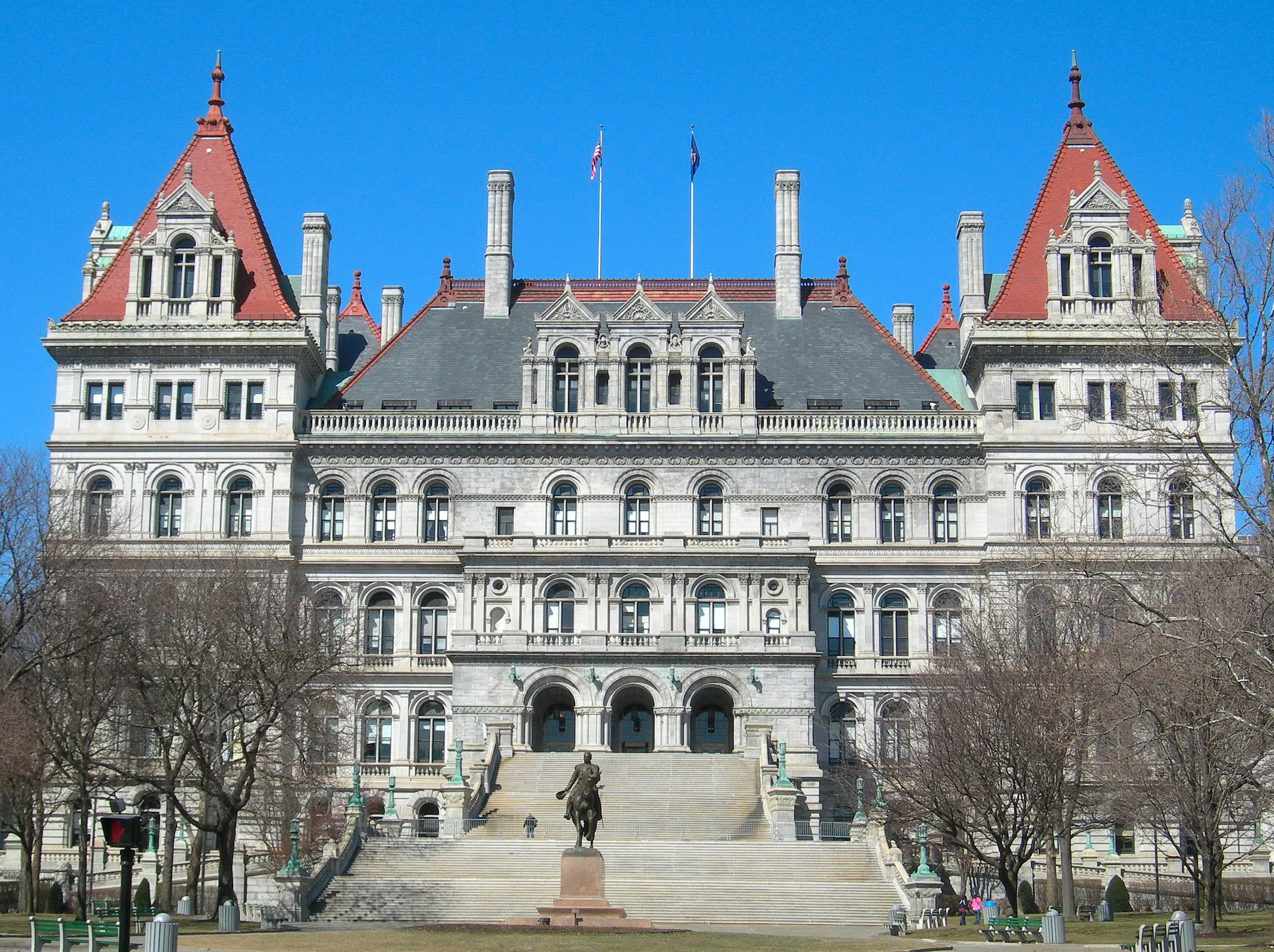
The New York State Capitol

On July 10, 2024, Ken Zebrowski resigned his elected position in the New York State Assembly 96th District six months before he was to leave Albany for good.

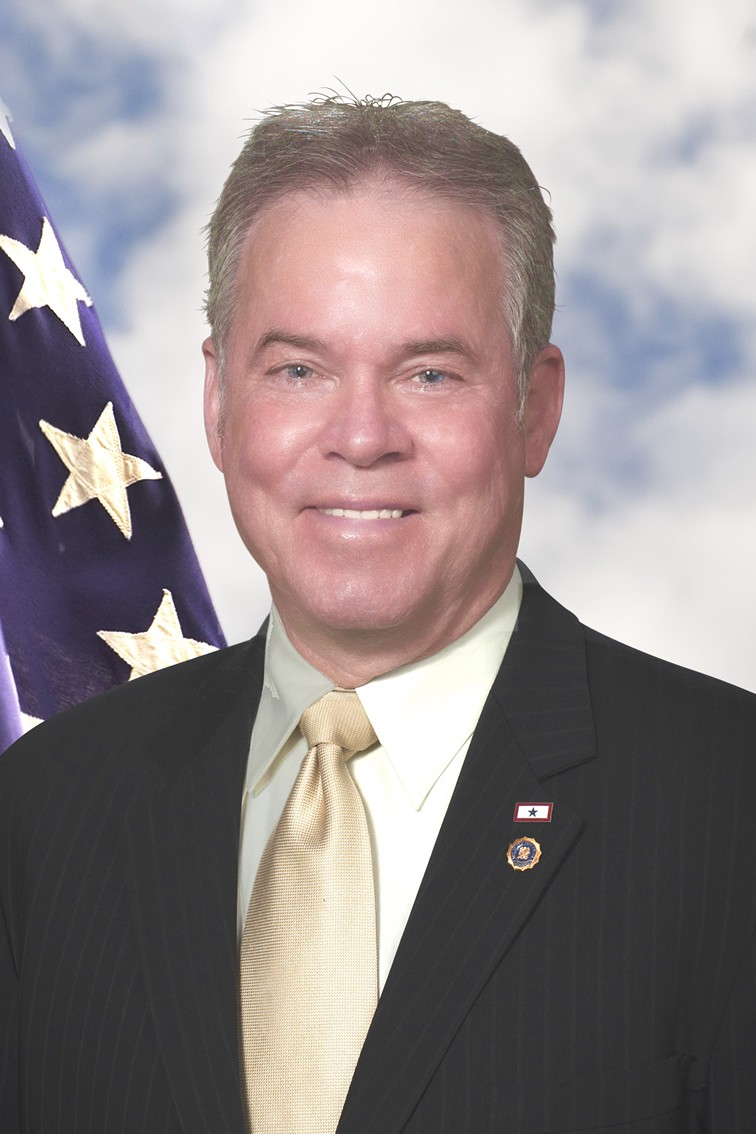
Edwin J Day

Rockland County Executive
Name	Years Served	Party
John T. Grant	1985–1993	Democrat
C. Scott Vanderhoef	1993–2013	Republican
Edwin J Day	2013–	Republican

In 2025, Rockland County, New York, received an issuer and limited tax general obligation (LTGO) bond rating of Aaa from Moody's Investors Service. Moody's Investors Service defines an Aaa rating as representing the highest quality and lowest level of credit risk. Rockland County is the only county in New York State to hold a Moody's Aaa rating.

In 2026, Rockland County received Aaa, AAA, and AA+ rating respectively from Moody's, Fitch and S&P Global. Rockland County is only one of two counties in New York State to receive Fitch AAA rating.

Rockland County has a county legislature made up of 17 members, elected from single-member districts. This includes 12 Democrats, 5 Republicans. The Chairman of the Legislature is Democrat Jay Hood Jr. As of January 2025, the legislators are:

Rockland County Legislators
District	Legislator	Party	Area Represented
1	Douglas J. Jobson	Republican	Stony Point
2	Paul C Cleary	Democrat	West Haverstraw
3	Jay Hood Jr. Chair	Democrat	Haverstraw
4	Itamar Yeger	Democrat	Wesley Hills
5	Lon M. Hofstein Minority Leader	Republican	New City
6	Alden H. Wolfe Majority Leader	Democrat	Suffern
7	Philip Soskin Second Vice-Chair	Democrat	Monsey
8	Toney L. Earl	Democrat	Hillcrest
9	Raymond Sheridan III Deputy Minority Leader	Republican	Pearl River
10	Beth Davidson	Democrat	West Nyack
11	Will Kennelly	Republican	Congers
12	Jesse Malowitz	Democrat	Airmont
13	Moshe Hopstein Deputy Majority Leader	Democrat	Spring Valley
14	Aney Paul Vice Chair	Democrat	Nanuet
15	Joel Friedman	Democrat	Chestnut Ridge
16	Thomas F. Diviny	Republican	Pearl River
17	Dana Stilley	Democrat	Sparkill

Rockland Community College appointed County Legislator Dana G. Stilley and Legislative Fiscal Director Moshe Gruber as its unanimous choices of the Rockland County Legislature's bipartisan Multi-Services Committee.

On February 14, 2025 – Valentine's Day, Assemblyman Aron Wieder resigned his Rockland legislature seat in Spring Valley 13th district he kept after starting his position at New York State Assembly at the 97th district.

=== Town governments ===
The five towns of Rockland County are led by town supervisors and town boards. The villages encompassed in the towns are led by mayors and village trustees.
As of the November 2023 elections, the town supervisors are:

Rockland County Town Supervisors
Town	Supervisor	Party
Clarkstown	George A. Hoehmann	Republican
Haverstraw	Howard T. Phillips Jr.	Democrat
Orangetown	Teresa M. Kenny	Republican
Ramapo	Michael Specht	Democrat
Stony Point	Jim Monaghan	Republican

Clarkstown

Haverstraw

Orangetown

Ramapo

Stony Point

=== County courts ===
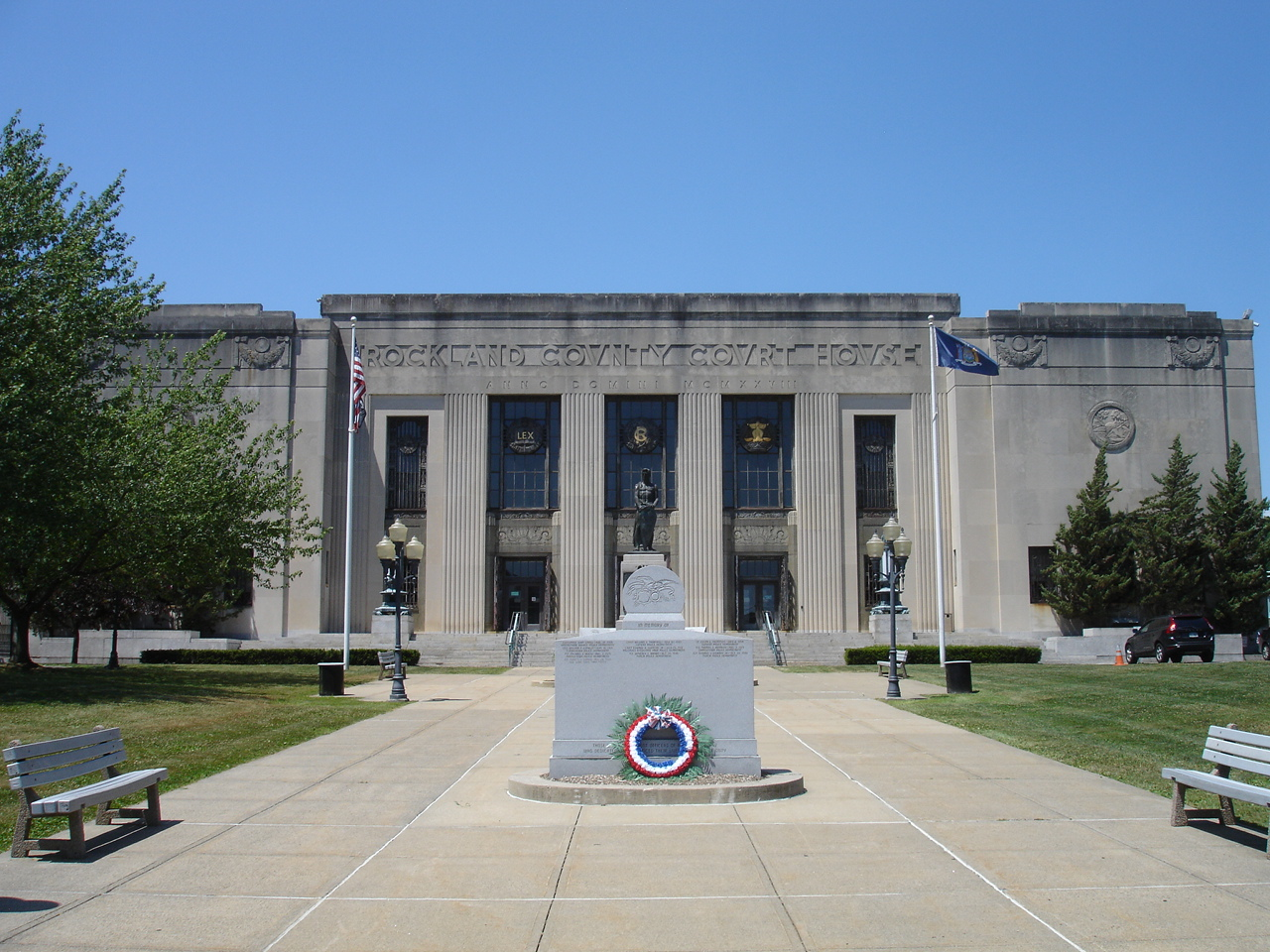
Rockland County Courthouse, New City

There are three types of general trial courts in Rockland County: the New York Supreme Court, the County Court, and the Justice Courts. The Supreme Court is the trial level court of the New York State Unified Court System, which presents some confusion as the Supreme Court is the highest court of appeals in the federal system, as well as in most states (the Court of Appeals is the highest court in New York). The Supreme Court has broad authority over all categories of cases, both civil and criminal. Generally, the Supreme Court in Rockland County hears civil cases involving claims in excess of $25,000. While the Supreme Court has jurisdiction over criminal cases in most counties, this is handled by the County Courts. In Rockland, however, the Supreme Court does exercise jurisdiction over some criminal cases.

The County Court is inferior to the Supreme Court and is authorized to hear criminal cases that have occurred in the county as well as limited jurisdiction over civil cases. The County Court handles felony cases exclusively and shares jurisdiction with the town and village justice courts on misdemeanor cases and other minor offenses and violations. The County Court's jurisdiction on civil cases is limited to those involving less than $25,000.

Each of the towns and 15 of the villages have Justice Courts, which mostly hear routine traffic ticket cases, especially from the New York State Thruway and the Palisades Interstate Parkway. They also handle drunk driving charges, lower-level criminal misdemeanor matters, and occasionally perform arraignment on felonies (most felony proceedings are heard in County Court). These courts generally handle the highest volume of cases.

=== Law enforcement ===
On March 1, 2024, Deirdre Smith was sworn in as the first female officer to serve as chief of detectives for Rockland County.

=== National politics ===
Like most of the Hudson Valley, Rockland County historically voted Republican but has shifted Democratic in recent years. From 1892 to 1992, Democrats won the county in presidential elections only three times: during Lyndon B. Johnson's 1964 landslide, Franklin D. Roosevelt's 1936 landslide (when it was the only New York City suburb to vote Democratic), and Woodrow Wilson's 1912 campaign in which the Republican vote was split. Rockland County began trending Democratic in 1992 and has voted Republican just twice since then, though races remain more competitive than in neighboring Westchester County, which has consistently delivered Democratic victories since the 1990s. Rockland County supported Republicans George W. Bush in 2004 and Donald Trump in 2024, with Trump winning by the largest margin since 1988. Rockland County now holds a unique distinction: it is the only county in the United States to have voted for the winner of the national popular vote in every presidential election since 1980, after St. Joseph County, Indiana and Caddo Parish, Louisiana broke their similar streaks by voting Democratic in 2024.

United States presidential election results for Rockland County, New York
Year	Republican		Democratic		Third party(ies)	
Year	No.	%	No.	%	No.	%
1856	668	21.34%	1,526	48.74%	937	29.93%
1860	1,410	37.31%	2,369	62.69%	0	0.00%
1880	2,688	43.96%	3,415	55.86%	11	0.18%
1884	2,593	40.26%	3,697	57.40%	151	2.34%
1888	3,013	41.83%	3,939	54.69%	251	3.48%
1892	2,909	41.01%	3,789	53.42%	395	5.57%
1896	4,336	56.95%	3,002	39.43%	276	3.62%
1900	4,187	50.16%	4,021	48.17%	139	1.67%
1904	4,283	48.99%	4,246	48.57%	213	2.44%
1908	4,857	52.64%	3,937	42.67%	433	4.69%
1912	2,221	24.55%	4,241	46.87%	2,586	28.58%
1916	5,041	52.19%	4,469	46.27%	149	1.54%
1920	11,169	66.10%	5,057	29.93%	671	3.97%
1924	11,915	60.92%	5,640	28.84%	2,004	10.25%
1928	15,732	60.34%	9,769	37.47%	571	2.19%
1932	13,963	49.90%	13,347	47.70%	672	2.40%
1936	15,583	48.56%	15,876	49.47%	631	1.97%
1940	20,040	56.77%	14,897	42.20%	362	1.03%
1944	19,471	59.00%	13,437	40.72%	91	0.28%
1948	20,661	57.83%	13,066	36.57%	2,001	5.60%
1952	27,657	64.39%	15,084	35.12%	212	0.49%
1956	34,049	71.04%	13,881	28.96%	0	0.00%
1960	33,107	54.81%	27,178	45.00%	113	0.19%
1964	26,187	36.15%	46,173	63.74%	82	0.11%
1968	40,880	49.07%	36,948	44.35%	5,479	6.58%
1972	64,753	64.29%	35,771	35.52%	196	0.19%
1976	52,087	51.30%	48,673	47.93%	780	0.77%
1980	59,068	56.26%	35,277	33.60%	10,648	10.14%
1984	70,020	60.88%	44,687	38.85%	311	0.27%
1988	63,825	56.83%	47,634	42.42%	842	0.75%
1992	49,608	40.72%	56,759	46.59%	15,464	12.69%
1996	40,395	35.99%	63,127	56.24%	8,719	7.77%
2000	48,441	39.51%	69,530	56.72%	4,619	3.77%
2004	65,130	49.63%	64,191	48.91%	1,910	1.46%
2008	61,752	46.71%	69,543	52.61%	898	0.68%
2012	57,428	46.07%	65,793	52.78%	1,424	1.14%
2016	60,911	45.09%	69,342	51.33%	4,834	3.58%
2020	73,186	48.56%	75,802	50.30%	1,714	1.14%
2024	83,543	55.39%	65,880	43.68%	1,402	0.93%

== Sports ==
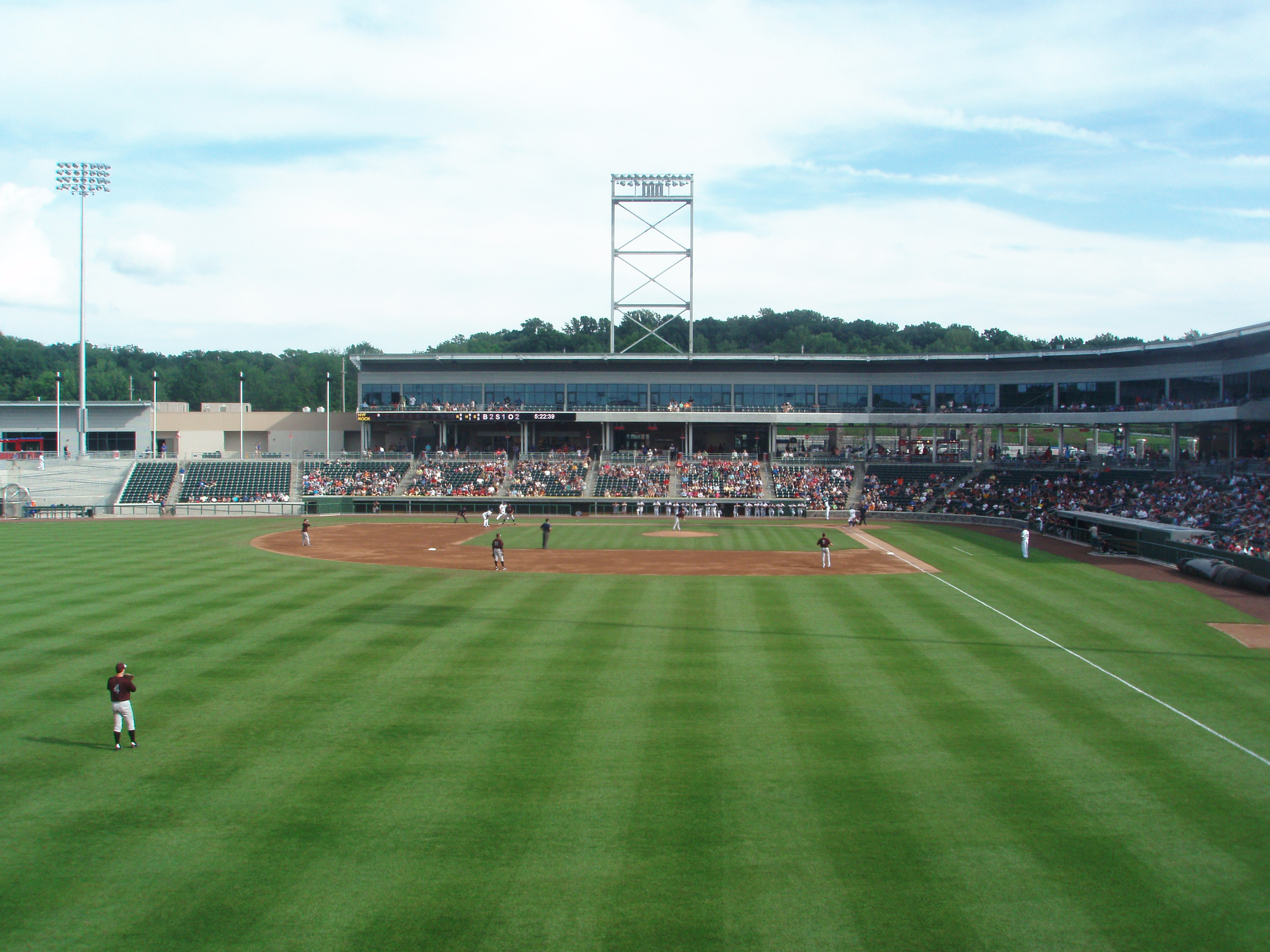
Clover Stadium, home of the New York Boulders

- The New York Boulders (formerly the Rockland Boulders), a member of the National Association of Professional Baseball, was founded in 2011 by former Yankee catcher John Flaherty of Pearl River, Clarkstown resident Michael Aglialoro (president of Clarkstown Education Foundation) and Stephen Mulvey (former part-owner of the Brooklyn-Los Angeles Dodgers). The team, owned by Bottom 9 Baseball, play their home games at the 6,362-seat, 16-suite Clover Stadium.
- Rockland Country Club is located in Sparkill, New York and features an 18-hole golf course.
- The New York Raiders, an American semi-professional rugby league football team based in Congers, New York, currently play in the American National Rugby League (AMNRL) competition. Their home games are at Rockland Lake State Park; they partner with the Canberra Raiders of Australia's National Rugby League (NRL).
- The Nyack Rocklands played minor league baseball in the North Atlantic League from 1946 to 1948. The Rocklands were an affiliate of the Philadelphia Athletics.

== Media ==
- The Journal News
- Our Town
- WRKL AM 910
- WRCR AM 1700
- Left of the Hudson
- Rockland World Radio
- Nyack News and Views
- Rockland County Times
- Rockland Review
- The Hook
- Rockland County's Best Magazine
- Clipper
- The 2017 CW series, Riverdale - Rockland County mentioned in pilot as site.

== Health ==
According to Scorecard.org, which integrates data from different sources including the United States Environmental Protection Agency (EPA), in 2002, Rockland County ranked among the worst 10% in the United States in terms of air releases. Recent EPA statistics show that a total of 66 presently active Rockland County facilities are currently regulated. In Scorecard's list of Top 10 polluters from 2002, the Lovett generating station in Tompkins Cove is the top polluter, releasing 1,523,339 pounds of toxic emissions. Studies were released in 2000 and in 2004 by the Clean Air Task Force to study the impacts of power plant emissions in the United States. This data for Rockland County shows that a total of $2,150,800 was paid in compensation for numerous illnesses caused by power plant pollution, including asthma attacks, heart attacks and death. The Lovett generating station was closed and dismantled prior to 2014. From 2015 to 2018, the Haverstraw Quarry owned and managed by CRH Tilcon and Oldcastle Materials was heavily fined for air and water pollution, including over-blasting, over-excavating, non-viable use of its NESCO unhealthy dust suppression systems and lethal dust & water runoffs into protected waterways. In the period from 2017 to 2020, Suez experienced instances of discolored water and odor complaints. During 2020, the Rockland County Health Dept. and New York State Department of Environmental Conservation (NYSDEC) Conservationfound/investigated and informed Suez of untreated polluted water at Tilcon operated discharge points at a stream that flows into Lake DeForest. After discovery, Tilcon stopped pumping the waste. Higher cancer rates in Rockland County as compared to Manhattan associate towards drinking water quality, aging drink water infrastructure/storm drain runoff concerns.

The COVID-19 pandemic was first confirmed to have reached Rockland County on March 6, 2020. After the areas of Spring Valley and Monsey were identified as having the highest infection rates, County Executive Ed Day requested that state emergency management declare those areas a closed containment zone. As of July 4, 2021, there are a total of 47,027 COVID-19 cases and 966 deaths. At 14,450 cases per 100,000, Rockland had the greatest density of COVID-19 cases of any New York county. 47% of the population and 58% of the eligible population (aged 12 and over) have been vaccinated. The Orthodox Jewish community, the largest in the country, have some of the lowest vaccination rates in the state; Monsey's is the lowest in the state, at 17.8%, as of June 15, 2021.

News reports confirmed that the first known case of polio in the United States in a decade was discovered in Rockland County in July 2022.

== Solar field ==
In 2014, Clarkstown created a first-of-its-kind in New York State 2.3-megawatt solar panel system consisting of about 4,300 panels on top of a closed, highly regulated, flat shadeless 13-acre section of the former garbage landfill in West Nyack. The unit is sized to generate 3 million kilowatt-hours annually – enough power to supply about 200 homes, that provides one-third of the electric needs of the Town of Clarkstown government. The Clarkstown solar field project is at the maximum size that is currently allowed by New York State. The installation was projected to save taxpayers as much as $4 million over 30 years by reducing the amount of the town's annual electric bill – which is about $2 million and produce 10 percent of all the electricity that O&R gets through solar power. The project was installed in summer 2014, coming online in October.

== Municipalities ==
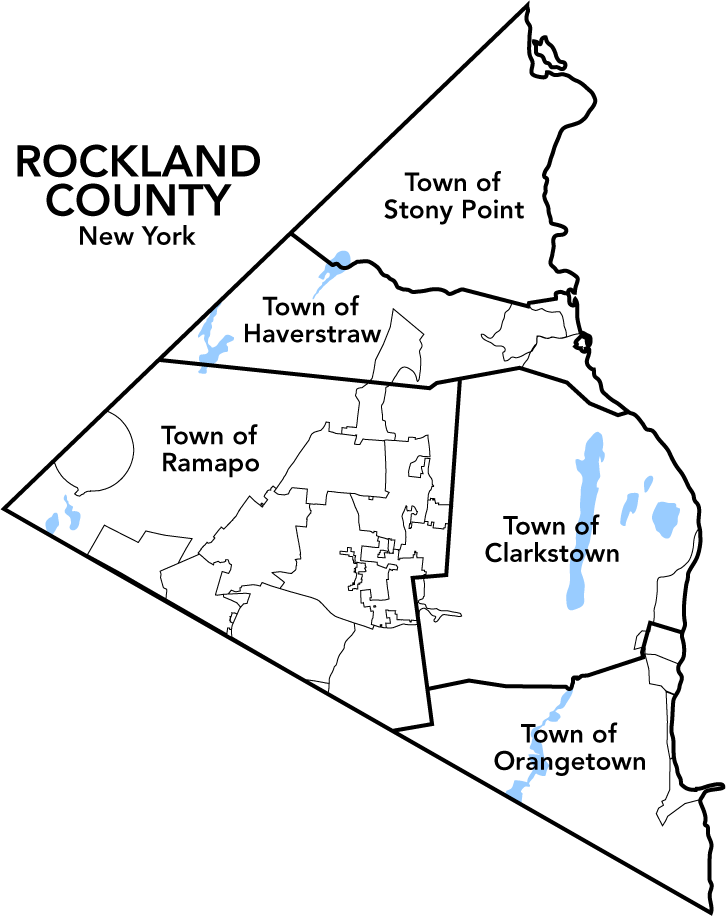
County map, with town and village boundaries

Paul W. Adler, the chairperson of the Rockland County's Jewish Community Relations Council, said in a 1997 New York Times article that "There are two reasons villages get formed in Rockland. One is to keep the Hasidim out and the other is to keep the Hasidim in."

Administrative divisions of New York
There are five towns in Rockland County. The most populous is Ramapo at 148,919, while the least populous is Stony Point, at 14,655, according to the 2020 US Census.
There are eighteen incorporated villages in Rockland County after the April 2022 dissolution of the Village of South Nyack. Twelve are located at least partially in the town of Ramapo; none are in Stony Point.
There are eighteen census-designated places and eight hamlets within the five towns of Rockland County.

=== Towns ===
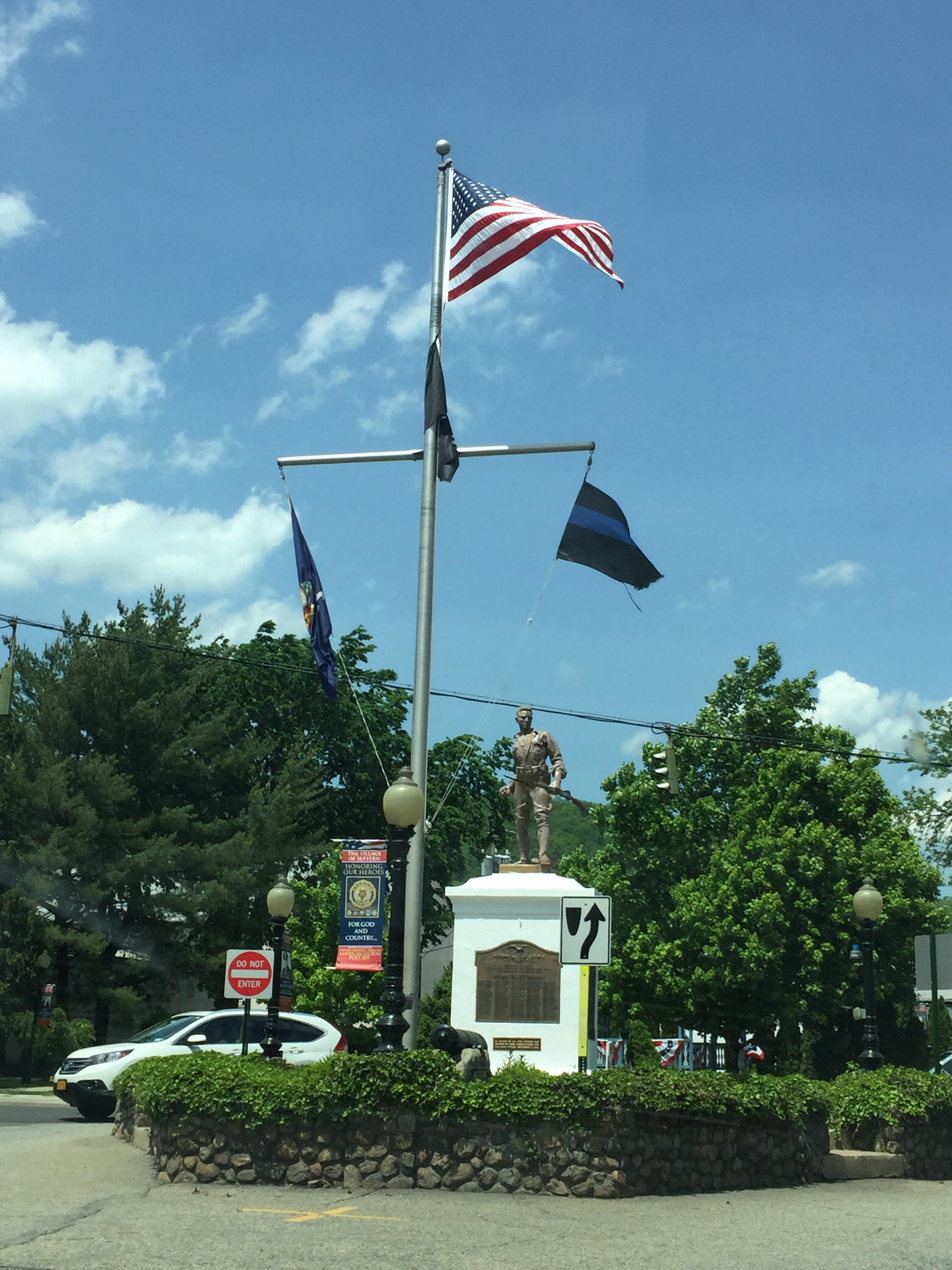
Washington Avenue Soldier's Monument in Ramapo

- Clarkstown (pop. 86,855)
- Haverstraw (pop. 39,087)
- Orangetown (pop. 48,655)
- Ramapo (pop. 148,919)
- Stony Point (pop. 14,655)

Clarkstown is divided into 4 wards for the purposes of municipal representation

=== Villages (Zip-codes) ===
- Airmont (109–01–52)
- Chestnut Ridge (109-52-65-77)
- Grand View-on-Hudson (10960)
- Haverstraw (10927)
- Hillburn (10931)
- Kaser (10952)
- Montebello (10901)
- New Hempstead (10977)
- New Square (10977)
- Nyack (10960)
- Piermont (10968)
- Pomona (10970)
- Sloatsburg (10974)
- Spring Valley (10977)
- Suffern (10901)
- Upper Nyack (10960)
- Wesley Hills (10977)
- West Haverstraw (10993)

=== Census-designated places (Zip-codes) ===
- Bardonia (10954)
- Blauvelt (10913)
- Congers (10920)
- Hillcrest (10977)
- Monsey (10952)
- Mount Ivy (10970)
- Nanuet (10954)
- New City (county seat) (10956)
- Orangeburg (10962)
- Pearl River (10965)
- South Nyack (10960)
- Sparkill (10976)
- Stony Point (10980)
- Tappan (10983)
- Thiells (10984)
- Valley Cottage (10989)
- Viola (10901)
- West Nyack (10994)

=== Hamlets (Zip-codes) ===
- Central Nyack (10960)
- Garnerville (10923)
- Jones Point (10986)
- Palisades (10964)
- Rockland Lake (10989)
- Sparkill Previously known as Tappan Sloat (10983)
- Tallman (10982)
- Tomkins Cove (10986)

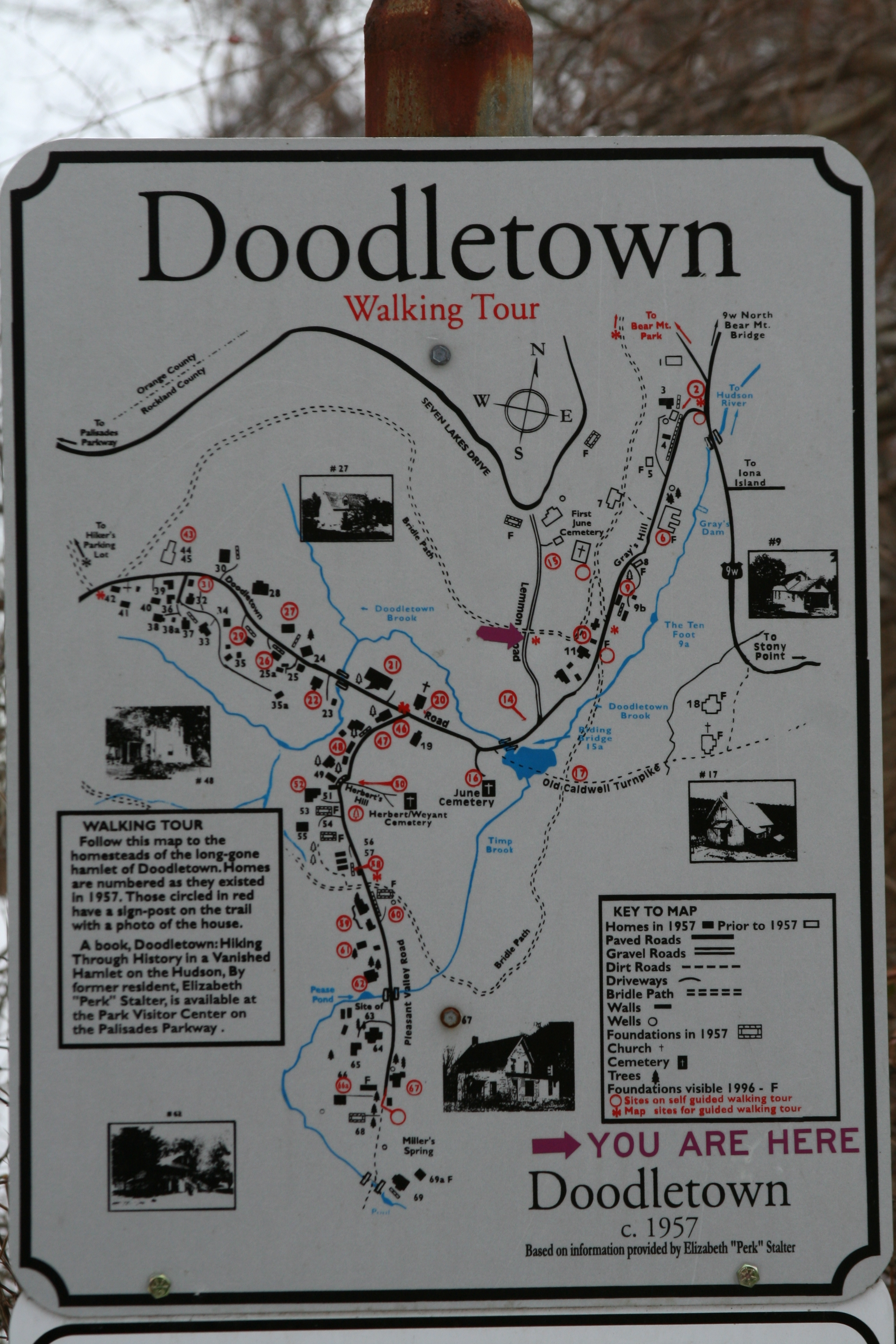
Doodletown

=== Defunct communities (Zip-codes) ===
- Doodletown (10986)
- Grassy Point (10980)
- Johnsontown (10974)
- Ladentown (10970)
- Middletown (10965)
- Nauraushaun (10965)
- St John's in the Wilderness (10980)
- Tappan Sloat (10983)
- Sandyfield (10983)
- Sickletown (10962)
- Sterlington (10974)

== Points of interest ==
=== Educational and cultural ===
- Major John Andre Monument - Tappan, New York. Represents British army officer John André, put to death for assisting Benedict Arnold in his attempted surrender in West Point during the American Revolutionary War.
- Camp Shanks - Orangetown, New York. A museum in a former military camp, named for Major General David Carey Shanks (1861–1940).
- Edward Hopper Birthplace and Boyhood Home- Nyack, New York. The home of American realism painter Edward Hopper, now an art center.
- Mount Moor African-American Cemetery - Established in 1849 and contains approximately 90 known graves and is located at Palisades Center, West Nyack.
- The Old 76 House- Tappan, New York. One of the oldest bars in America, a meeting place for Patriots during the Revolutionary War, headquarters of Nathaniel Greene.
- Washington Avenue Soldier's Monument and Triangle - Suffern, New York. Honors George Washington and Rochambeau, where they encamped during the American Revolutionary War.

=== Commercial and entertainment ===
- Blue Hill Plaza - Pearl River, New York. 21-story office tower and an eight-story office building on 90-acres of landscaped and wooded property.
- Clover Stadium - Ramapo, New York. A baseball stadium home to the New York Boulders and the St. Thomas Aquinas College baseball team.
- Lafayette Theatre - A movie palace in downtown Suffern, New York. Established in 1924.
- Palisades Center - West Nyack, New York. Opened in 1998, one of America's largest shopping malls.
- Rockland Bakery - Nanuet, New York. A large bakery opened in 1986, it supplies bread to the United States Military Academy at West Point, as well as restaurants and delis as far away as Connecticut, New Jersey and Pennsylvania.
- The Shops at Nanuet - Nanuet, New York. Opened in 1969 as Nanuet Mall. It was the site of the notorious 1981 Brinks Robbery.

=== Parks ===
- Bear Mountain State Park - Stony Point, New York
- Blauvelt State Park - Blauvelt, New York
- Harriman State Park (bordered between Rockland and Orange County, New York)
- High Tor State Park - Clarkstown, New York
- Hook Mountain State Park - Clarkstown, New York
- Nyack Beach State Park - Upper Nyack, New York
- Rockland Lake State Park - Congers, New York
- Tallman Mountain State Park - Orangetown, New York

== Notable people ==
Well-known residents of Rockland County have included:

- Aaron T. Demarest
- Adam Chanler-Berat
- Adam Rodriguez
- Adam Schein
- Aidan Quinn
- Al Markim
- Al Pacino
- Alexandra Tolstaya
- Aline Griffith
- Alan J. Lerner
- Amos Pollard
- Amy Leventer
- Andre Watts
- Andrew Carpenter Wheeler
- Angelina Jolie
- Anita Shreve
- Arthur S. Tompkins
- Arthur Zegart
- Audrey Landers
- Audric Estimé
- Backseat Boyz
- Beri Weber
- Betty Friedan
- Bill Gunn
- Bill Mauldin
- Bill Murray
- Bishop Nehru
- Brian Fechino
- Brian Gaine
- Burgess Meredith
- Charles Wright Mills
- C.J. Nitkowski
- Carole Radziwill
- Caroline Lexow Babcock
- Carson McCullers
- Charles E. Gannon
- Charles MacArthur
- Charles Samuels
- Charlotte Thompson
- Chris Caffery
- Chris O'Grady
- Christina Bianco
- Christine Andreas
- Christopher Carley
- Chuck Barris
- Chuck Loeb
- Claudio Sanchez
- Coheed and Cambria
- Conrad Hoffmann Jr.
- Corey Baker
- Cynthia Hesdra
- Dan Fortmann
- Dan Gurewitch
- Dan Masterson
- Dan Pasqua
- Daniel Carter Beard
- Dave Annable
- Dave Breger
- David Zaslav
- Derrick Lassic
- Devin McCourty
- Doc Powell
- Don Costa
- Dorothy Delay
- Edward Hopper
- Fabrizio Sotti
- Freddie Roman
- Frederick Loewe
- Gary Chester
- George M. Cohan
- George Marshall
- George William Hill
- George Worth
- Gerald S. O'Loughlin
- Gerard Benderoth
- Gertrude Crotty Davenport
- Ginny Gibson
- Glynis Sweeny
- Grace VanderWaal
- Greg Wyatt
- Harold Coletta
- Harvey Swados
- Hayden Panettiere
- Helen Hayes
- Henry D. Todd
- Henry Varnum Poor
- Hugo Robus
- Huntington Hartford
- Ida Mary Barry Ryan
- Isaac Bonewits
- Isaac Hager
- Ismael Quintana
- Jack Klugman
- Jack Lew
- Jake T. Austin
- James Cox Chambers
- James MacArthur
- James Maritato
- Jansen Panettiere
- Jason McCourty
- Jason Vosler
- Jay Beckenstein
- Jean Muir
- Jermaine Paul
- Jim Shooter
- Jo Anne Worley
- Joe Humeres
- Joe Lockhart
- John Andre
- John Cage
- John Dos Passos
- John Drake Sloat
- John Flaherty
- John Francis Daley
- John Masters
- John McGillicuddy
- John Quidor
- John Steinbeck
- John W. Ferdon
- John William Hill
- Jonathan Demme
- Jordan Rudess
- Joseph A. Komonchak
- Joseph Alessi
- Joseph Cornell
- Josephine Pucci
- JP Grayson
- Judy Landers
- Julia Haart
- Julianna Margulies
- Julie Buxbaum
- June Shagaloff Alexander
- Junior Galette
- Katharine Hepburn
- Keith Bulluck
- Kristi Zea
- Kurt Weill
- Laurence Olivier
- Leander Tomarkin
- Leib Tropper
- Leonidas Hubbard
- Leonidas Hubbard Jr
- Lew Leslie
- Lipa Schmeltzer
- Lori Barbero
- Lotte Lenya
- Lucy Grealy
- Macduff Everton
- Marc Elias
- Margaret Salmon
- Mario Perillo
- Mark Fergus
- Marty Springstead
- Mary Beth Keane
- Mary Horgan Mowbray-Clarke
- Matt Hennessy
- Matt Siegel
- Matthew Winkler
- Maurice Heaton
- Mayer Schiller
- Megan Leavey
- Michael A. Donaldson
- Michael E. Horowitz
- Michael Park
- Michael Rogers
- Michael S. Schmidt
- Mike Bodker
- Mike Kellin
- Mike Lawler
- Mike Wallace
- Mikhail Baryshnikov
- Milton Cunniff
- Mina Benson Hubbard
- Mitch Miller
- Mondaire Jones
- Mordechai Hager
- Mordechai Shapiro
- Morris Kantor
- Morty Gunty
- Murray Olderman
- Myron Cohen
- Nat Fein
- Nicholas Allard
- Nick Perito
- Noël Coward
- Norman Rose
- Orson Welles
- Otis H. Cutler
- Pat Hingle
- Paul E. Olsen
- Paulette Goddard
- Peter Daszak
- Peter Denoyelles
- Phil Bogle
- Phil Rosenthal
- Pierpoint Isham
- Pinchas Zukerman
- Princess Vera Constantinovna of Russia
- Ralph Borsodi
- Regret the Hour
- Reuben L. Haskell
- Rob Senderoff
- Robert Clohessy
- Robert H. Gittins
- Robert Maclay
- Robert A. Widenmann
- Rose Thompson Hovick
- Rosie O'Donnell
- Ryan Grant
- Saigon
- Sakina Jaffrey
- Sam Rosen
- Samuel Reshevsky
- Sarah Weeks
- Sebastian Stan
- Seth Joyner
- Shalom Auslander
- Sheridan Rúitín
- Shyne
- Skylar Astin
- Stephen Baldwin
- Stephen Greene
- Steven Hill
- Steven Mercurio
- Steward Ceus
- Terrence Fede
- John Jurasek
- Thomas Berger
- Thomas Meehan
- Thomas Morahan
- Tim Daly
- Tina Fey
- Tommy Murphy
- Tommy Grayson
- Toni Morrison
- Tony DeFrancesco
- Tovia Singer
- Tracy Wolfson
- Trey Anastasio
- Tyne Daly
- Valerie Harper
- Van Johnson
- Vivien Leigh
- Vladimir Nikolayevich Petrov
- Walt Weiss
- Welles Crowther
- Will Cunnane
- Will Geer
- William Gaddis
- William Hurt
- William Sloane
- William Styron
- Wilson P. Foss Jr.
- Yaakov Kamenetsky
- Yosef Mizrachi
- Zita Johann
- Zoot Sims

== See also ==
- Downstate New York
- Hudson Valley
- List of counties in New York
- List of New York State Historic Markers in Rockland County, New York
- National Register of Historic Places listings in Rockland County, New York
- Ramapough Mountain Indians
- Rumachenanck tribe
- Brink's robbery (1981)
- Gilchrest Road, New York crossing accident
