= Rockland Country Club =

Coordinates: 41°01′29″N 73°55′04″W

- Interactive map of Rockland Country Club

Club information
- Location: Sparkill, Orangetown, Rockland County, New York, USA
- Established: 1906
- Type: Private
- Tota holes: 18
- Website: rocklandcountryclub.org
- Designed by: Robert White
- Par: 71
- Length: 6,703 yards
- Course rating: 73.6
- Slope rating: 139

Rockland Country Club is located in Sparkill, New York, and features an 18-hole golf course.

== History ==
The club was incorporated in 1906 and commissioned Henry Stark to design a 9-hole course that was ready the following year. Robert White laid out an entirely new golf course that opened in 1930, expanding the layout to 18 holes. Alfred Tull designed the present 12th and 13th holes in 1963, after the club decided to abandon the former 8th and 9th holes on the east side of Route 9W, which ran down to the Hudson River but required crossing a busy highway. Robert Trent Jones redesigned the course in 1965. John Harvey was later brought in during the late 1990s to update the traditional layout.

The course was remodeled featuring all-new cloverleaf-type bunkering, removal of several blind shots, and several new tee boxes. Rockland Country Club's greens are known to be some of the firmest and fastest in the Metropolitan area. Several holes play up and down the ridges that dominate the property. The 4th and 12th holes, both par 4's, are prime examples of this feature. Both play considerably longer than the yardage due to the change in elevation. The club has been the host of the MET PGA Club Professional Championship, since 2008.
