= Joe Rand =

American politician

Member-elect of the New York Senate from the 38th district
- Assuming office January 2027
- Succeeding: Bill Weber

Personal details
- Party: Democratic

Joseph W. Rand is an American politician. He is the Democratic member-elect of the New York State Senate from the 38th district, defeating Bill Weber. Prior to his victory, he was an attorney, law professor, and real estate executive, and had served as mayor of Nyack since 2023.

== Biography ==
Rand obtained a BA from Georgetown University, JD from Georgetown University Law Center, and Master of the Science of Law from Stanford Law School. He clerked for circuit judge Frank X. Altimari from 1992 to 1994.

Rand was a securities attorney for Debevoise & Plimpton. He also taught law in Brooklyn Law School and Fordham Law School. He also works in real estate, with his positions including CEO of Better Homes and Gardens Real Estate Rand Realty and executive director of the Broker Public Portal, and he has authored two books on real estate, including How to be a Great Real Estate Agent.

In 2021, Rand was elected to the Nyack Village Board. In 2023, he became mayor of Nyack. As mayor, Rand presided over what he called the city's "constant state of rebirth", which included the opening of a few dozen businesses, the revival of former bars as restaurants, and the securing of investments such as $7.5 million worth of grants.

On December 8, 2025, Rand announced that he would run in the 2026 New York State Senate election for the 38th district, held by Republican Bill Weber since he flipped it from the Democrats. His campaign was centered on affordability, education, and infrastructor, and involved outreach with Orthodox Jewish communities. He also voiced support for better accountability towards the Hudson Link commuter bus service and MTA trains. He won the general election, unseating Weber.

Rand has two children with his wife, nonprofit executive Linie, as well as a dog.
