= Rockland Community College =

Public college in Suffern, New York, US

- Type: Public community college
- Established: 1959; 67 years ago
- Parent institution: State University of New York
- Affiliations: State University of New York, NJCAA Region 15, Mid Hudson Conference
- President: William P. Mullaney
- Undergraduates: 5,385 (fall 2025)
- Location: Suffern, New York, United States; 41°08′00″N 74°05′11″W
- Campus: 175 acres (0.71 km^{2})
- Colors: Killarney, Gunsmoke, Cream Can, Tangerine & White
- Nickname: Fighting Hawks
- Mascot: Rocky the Hawk
- Website: www.sunyrockland.edu

Rockland Community College (RCC) is a public community college in Rockland County, New York. It is part of the State University of New York. The college, established in 1959, became the 18th community college to join the SUNY system. The college offers 51 programs and offers associate degrees and certificates. The current enrollment is 6,859 students.

The main campus is in Suffern, New York, but classes are also offered at an extension sites in Nyack and Orangeburg.

== History ==
An institution called Rockland College, chartered by the state Board of Regents in 1878, existed for sixteen years in Nyack, New York but is not related to the current institution.

Rockland Junior College, supported by federal funds disbursed through New York State, and sponsored by Nyack High School was established in 1932 as one of several depression-era two-year schools. Rockland Junior College shut down in 1935.

The current Rockland Community College was founded in 1959. It was planned that it would raise taxes by only $4 a year. Between 1956 and 1970, Rockland's population was one of the fastest growing in the state, expected to double from 107,000 to 215,000 and the number of high school graduates was projected to rise from 700 to 2,463.

Large local industries like Avon Products in Suffern and Lederle Laboratories in Pearl River required more skilled workers, and the growth of Rockland County hospitals, Nyack Hospital and Good Samaritan Hospital in Suffern warranted the creation of a nursing program.

Sixty-nine percent of parents polled expressed interest in their children attending a community college in Rockland County.

The Spring Valley satellite campus, sold for $4.2 million, has been discontinued. It was located in the historic North Main Street School. Instructions were discontinued at the Haverstraw Extension Center in 2020.

== Academics ==
Rockland Community College offers 40 associate degrees and 11 one-year certificate programs.

Rockland Community College has four schools: Business & Professional Studies; Arts, Education, Humanities, and Social Sciences; Nursing, Health, and Wellness; and Science, Technology, Engineering, and Mathematics (STEM). The college also offers community educational, high school, microcredential, and workforce development programs.

In 2017 Rockland Community College was ranked the best community college in New York for adult learners in Washington Monthly's recent annual ranking of American colleges and universities. Rockland Community College rated twenty-eighth nationwide out of nearly 1,500 two-year colleges. The following year, the college was named the fifth Campus Pride's 2018 Best of the Best LGBTQ-Friendly Colleges & Universities

In 2021, Rockland Community College received the Insight into Diversity Higher Education Excellence in Diversity (HEED) Award

=== Workforce Programs ===
In 2022, Economic Mobility Workforce Innovation (EMWI) Division of Rockland Community College was introduced focusing on Workforce development that provides employment prospects in work markets by offering comprehensive certificate programs, including Emergency Medical Services (EMS), Medical credentials, Commercial Driver's License (CDL), Google IT, "stack-able" credentials and community educational programs such as Computer literacy and Scholastic Aptitude Test review courses. Afterward, manufacturing certification programs were offered.

=== Nursing Simulation Lab ===
In September 2026, the RCC Nursing Simulation Lab was opened. It is a 5,000-square-foot facility with mannequin simulation patients.

=== Hospitality and Culinary Arts ===
The Hospitality and Culinary Arts program at Rockland Community College is located Nyack, New York.

=== High School Program ===
The Rockland Community College High School Program began in 2010. Rockland Community College academic departments have oversight of the curriculum, textbooks, and student assessments offered at the high schools. High school teachers who are college adjuncts teach the courses at the high schools. Rockland Community College participates in the New York Concurrent Enrollment Partnerships (NYCEP), which enables the college to network and share strategies of concurrent enrollment programs offered throughout SUNY community colleges.

=== English Skills Academy Program ===
The English Skills Academy (ESA) have Intensive English Programs (IEP) for immigrant and non-immigrant students who need to improve their academic English skills prior to starting their degree (credit), Workforce development or community education (non-credit) programs at Rockland Community College.

=== Cambridge University Study Abroad Program ===
Students must be at least 18 years of age and meet the requirement of a minimum 3.0 GPA and two faculty recommendations when classes begin at Cambridge University in July or August. Students can be from any college but must apply through the RCC Sam Draper M/TS Honors Program Office in Spring to be eligible.

=== Maritime Studies Program ===
Rockland Community College offers the nation's first Maritime Studies Program works with a US Coast Guard-approved partner featuring online training with hands-on classroom instruction at the college's campuses. Through the RCC/Learn America program, Mariners seeking work on board any vessel are required to complete a Coast Guard-approved Basic Training course. Students also are able to sign up for any of the individual elements of the Basic Training course.

=== State University of New York (SUNY), RCC and Local Programs ===
Rockland Community College offer these educational and supporting programs helping students to achieve their specific goals.

- ASAP (Advancing Success in Associate Pathways)
- Cross Registration (Non-Matriculating and Visiting Students)
- EDGE
- EOP
- FORD Asset
- H.E.R.R.O.
- High School Dual Enrollment
  - ERCSD Smart Scholars
  - Hudson Valley P-TECH
- Honors
- SUNY Academic Momentum Campaign (English & Math)
- SUNY Reconnect
- TRIO

== Accreditation ==
The college is accredited by the Middle States Commission on Higher Education. Some specific programs are also programmatically accredited:

- Accreditation Commission for Education in Nursing, Inc (ACEN)
- American Occupational Therapy Association Accreditation Council for Occupational Therapy Education
- New York State Board of Regents, State Education Department, Office of the Professions (Nursing Education)
- American Bar Association for the Legal Studies Program
- National Association for the Education of Young Children for childcare at the Theresa Morahan Simmons Center for Children and Families aka Campus Fun and Learn Center

== Administration ==
RCC is sponsored by the County of Rockland and operating and administered by a ten-member Rockland Community College Board of Trustees that is appointed pursuant to New York State Education Law § 6306. Nine of the Trustees serve seven-year terms, with five of those appointed by the county and four by the Governor. The tenth trustee is a voting, student representative. The board in turn appoints a President who hires and supervises the staff. RCC is a community college unit of the State University of New York and is also subject to regulation and visitation by the Regents of the University of the State of New York.

=== Presidents ===
- Frank Mosher, 1960–1963
- Seymour Eskow, 1963–1983
- F. Thomas Clark, 1983–1992
- Neil A Raisman, 1993–1997
- George Hamada, 1998–2001
- Thomas G. Voss, 2001–2003 (Interim)
- William J. Murabito, 2003–2004 (Interim)
- Clifford L. Wood, 2004–2017
- Michael A Baston 2017–2022
- Susan Deer (Officer In Charge) 2022–2023
- Lester Edgardo Sandres Rápalo, 2023
- Beth A. Coyle, (Officer in Charge), 2023–2024
- William P. Mullaney, 2025–present

In June 2024, Rockland Community College appointed County Legislator Dana G. Stilley and Legislative Fiscal Director Moshe Gruber as its unanimous choices of the Rockland County Legislature's bipartisan Multi-Services Committee after Rockland Community College and Lester Edgardo Sandres Rápalo parted ways after uncovering an $8 million deficit.

On Wednesday, June 26, 2024, the SUNY Rockland Community College Board of Trustees met and approved "Phase 3" which included a total of $2.6 million in jobs, positions, or roles at the college approved for termination to reduce the widely reported $5 million deficit that the college has faced. Several key positions were immediately eliminated, as well as 30-day notices given to at least one other longtime employee.

== Campus ==
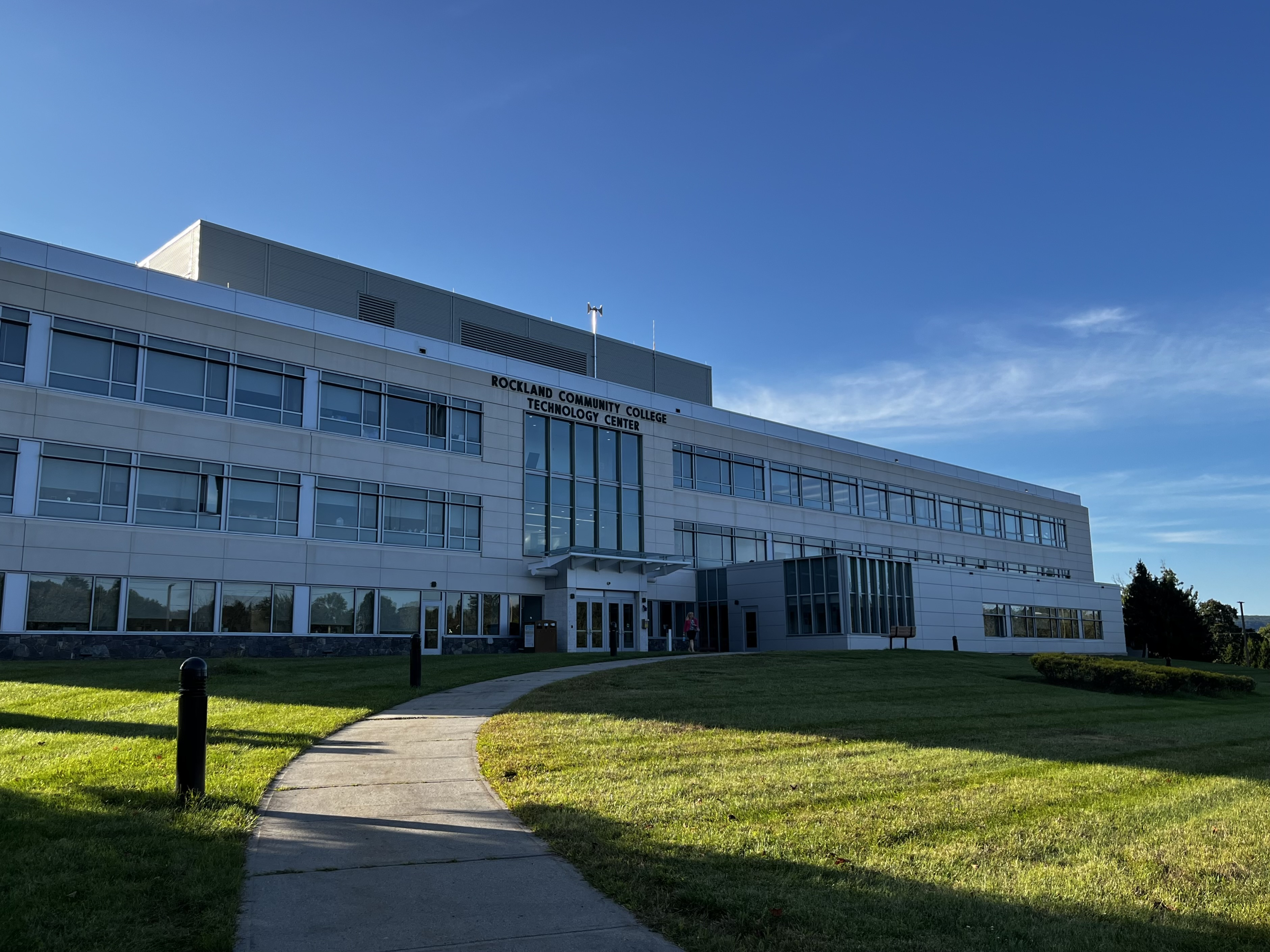
Technology Center

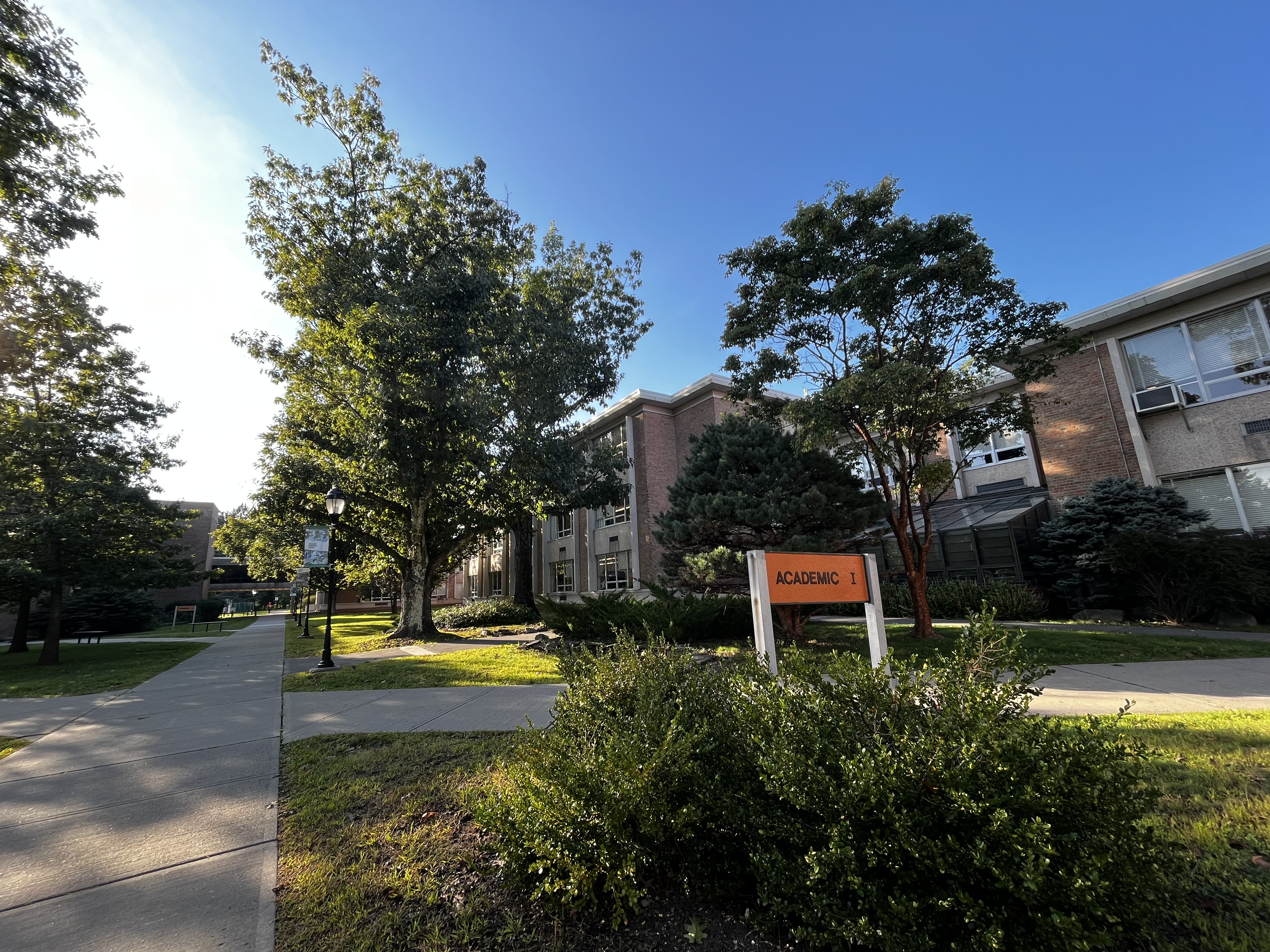
Academic I

The main campus and main entrance on Almshouse Road is located on the crest of a sloping rise in a former farm community known as Mechanicsville, renamed Viola when a post office was established in 1882. The original property included:

- A wooden barn that was converted into a theater and assembly room in the second semester.
- Fields leased to local farmers that yielded tomatoes and cabbage. The college later acquired 150 acres (0.6 km^{2}) of farmland—100 to the south from the Hurschle Brothers Farm, and 50 to the west from the Springsteen Farm—for its current 175-acre (0.7 km^{2}) campus. The barn was used for registration, physical education classes, sports team practices, large classes and final exams, dance classes, student-faculty talent shows, worship services, films, guest lecture series, concert series, even war protest rallies. It also served as the College Barn Theater. The Barn burned in January 1979; in 1983 it was replaced by the Cultural Arts Center.
- A "potter's field" cemetery, the burial grounds for many of the Almshouse residents. Shortly after the college was founded, the county deeded a tract of land in the northern section for establishing a veterans' cemetery, which remains today.
- A small square building with barred windows that served as the first Rockland County jail, later the Ramapo town police headquarters, and still later a police radio station. It was converted into offices and men's locker rooms for the physical education program in the second semester.
- A narrow, tree-lined country lane known as Almshouse Road, which became an interior access road when the current College Road was built.
- The three-story, colonial design Almshouse. In front of the Almshouse was a wooden gazebo that stood standing until September 8, 2025.

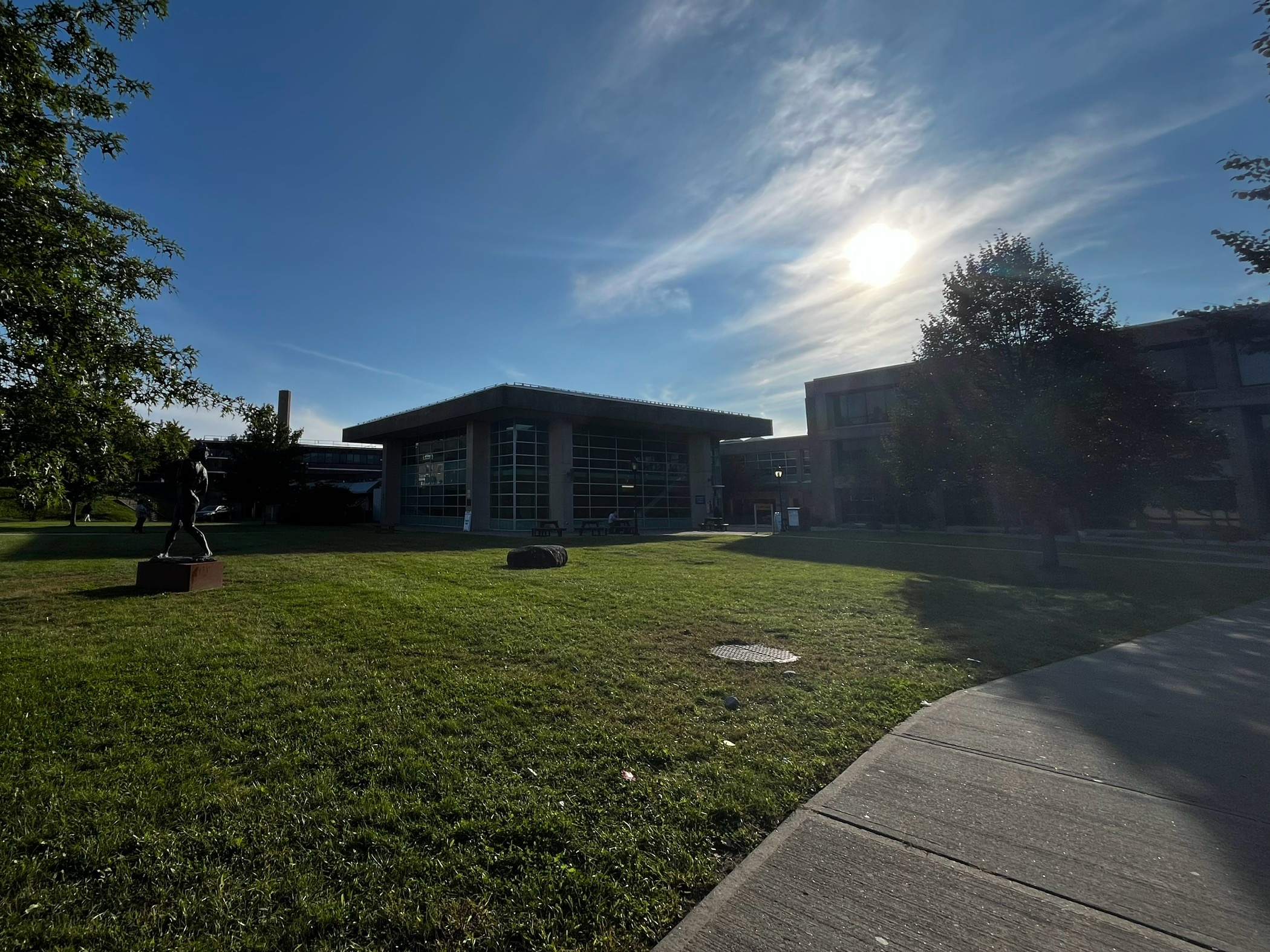
Student Union (left), Academic II (right)

In 2016 Rockland Community College opened The 211 Connection Center which connects students to off-campus resources regarding health and human services such as housing, childcare, food, utilities, and legal.

=== Gary Onderdonk Rockland Veterans Cemetery ===
A cemetery was established on the property for almshouse residents, and shortly after the property was designated for the college's campus, the county designated a tract to serve as a veterans cemetery. The Korean War Monument is large granite rock at the Gary Onderdonk Rockland Veterans Cemetery on Rockland Community College's campus with a plaque bearing the names of all 27 Rocklanders killed in action during the Korean War, with the inscription: "They gave their today for your tomorrow."

=== Veterans ===
On October 3, 2013, the United States Department of Veterans Affairs hosted the first induction of RCC students who are veterans into SALUTE - Veterans National Honors Society. SALUTE, established in 2008 is headquartered out of Colorado State University has over 90 chapters in colleges and universities across the country. RCC is the first community college to have a chapter of this organization.

=== Past Events ===
In the 1970, concerts and big-ticket events were held in the Eugene Levy Field house. Several major artist included, Billy Joel, Earth, Wind & Fire, Genesis, Meat Loaf, Styx and The Monkees.

== Athletics ==
The Rockland Hawks compete in the Mid Hudson Conference and belong to Region XV of the National Junior College Athletic Association. Many RCC alumni advance to competing at National Collegiate Athletic Association (NCAA) or National Association of Intercollegiate Athletics (NAIA) sponsored colleges or universities and several have gone on to professional sports careers as players, coaches, scouts and trainers.

=== Sports facilities ===
- Baseball games were played at the Village of Suffern ball field
- Basketball – The School used court time in gymnasiums at Suffern, Haverstraw, and Spring Valley high schools and a few junior highs.
- Bowling at Hi-Tor Lanes in West Haverstraw, NY.
- Calisthenics, jogging, archery, soccer, and Golf were held in the fields surrounding the small, peaked-roof building of the former Ramapo police station which housed the physical education office.
- Fencing, gymnastics and varsity wrestling practice were held at the Barn.
- Swimming and lifesaving were taught at the Bader's Hotel outdoor pool in Spring Valley.
- Deer Kill Day Camp in Suffern was rented to teach lifetime skill sports like tennis, handball, and one wall paddleball as well as softball and basketball.
- Eugene Levy athletic facility, known as the Fieldhouse was completed in 1972.

=== Sports championships ===
- February 2007 – RCC Fighting Hawks Men's Bowling Team won their first Region XV Championship in school history. RCC made up three of the six All-Region members.
- February 2009 – RCC Fighting Hawks Men's Basketball Team beat Sullivan County Community College Generals 81 – 77 to win the Region XV DIII Men's Championship.
- May 2011 – RCC Golf Team Wins Region XV Championship winning by a four-stroke margin over Nassau Community College.
- 2013 - Region XV Division II Baseball Champions NJCAA
- 2013 - Region XV Tournament Runner-up Women's Basketball Championship
- 2015 - Region XV Women's Singles Tennis Champion - Rockland Community College Elina Arakelyan
  - Elina qualified for NJCAA Division III National Championships, October 22–24 in Peachtree City, Georgia. Finished second. She and teammate Brooke Strieter also qualified to compete in the doubles tournament.
- 2016 - Region XV Division III Runner-up Men's Basketball Championship
- 2016 - Region XV Title - Men's Tennis Team Champions
- 2017 - Region XV Women's Mid-Hudson Championship Volleyball Conference Title
- 2018 - Region XV Men Golf Tournament Team Wins Third Place & three players; John Barna, Sean McGarvey and Anthony Mottolese qualified for Nationals hosted by Jamestown Community College at Chautauqua Golf Club in Chautauqua, New York.
  - 2018 Head Athletic Trainer of the Year for Community Colleges Nationwide - Diana Carey
- 2019 - Region XV Baseball - The Hawks won a School record of 26 games in a row and was the first team to go undefeated in regular season play finishing 19–0.
- 2021 - Northeast District B Champions - Lady Hawks Volleyball
- 2024 - Tayejon Lynch, for the third time in the college's history since 1991 and 2013 named NJCAA Rockland Community College Hawks Men's Basketball All-American in the Mid-Hudson conference
- 2025 - Captured the Region XV Title, by scoring 12 unanswered runs in the bottom of the 8th inning to overcome a 0–10 deficit. The baseball team is heading to the NJCAA East District Tournament.

=== New York Boulders ===
Rockland Community College was the training camp site in 2011 for the Rockland Boulders (now the New York Boulders of the Frontier League) during the construction of their ballpark, Clover Stadium in Pomona, New York.

== Notable faculty ==
- Edmund Wyatt Gordon (2006–2011) scholar in residence - In 2025 The Ellipse, the lecture hall at Rockland Community College (RCC) located on the first floor in the college's Technology Center was named in his honor.
- Dan E. Masterson (February 22, 1934 – August 12, 2022), poet - Taught at Rockland Community College for 53 years.

== Notable alumni ==
- David Carlucci, New York State Senator
- Abel Ferrara, film director best known for Bad Lieutenant and King of New York
- Bruce Kreutzer, assistant coach for the Orlando Magic of the National Basketball Association (NBA) and former RCC basketball player
- Thomas P. Morahan (1931 – 2010), New York State Senator and member of the New York State Assembly
- Michael "Dr. Miami" Salzhauer, celebrity plastic surgeon
- Jean Paul Laurent, Haitian dentist and philanthropist
- Lipa Schmeltzer, Vocalist, composer, singer, performer
