= Thomas P. Morahan =

American politician

Member of the New York State Senate from the 38th district
- In office May 1999 – July 12, 2010
- Preceded by: Joseph Holland
- Succeeded by: David Carlucci

Member of the New York State Assembly from the 96th district
- In office January 1981 – December 1982
- Preceded by: Robert Connor
- Succeeded by: Lawrence Bennett

Personal details
- Born: October 11, 1931 Bronx, New York, U.S.
- Died: July 12, 2010 (aged 78) Manhattan, New York, U.S.
- Party: Republican
- Spouse: Helen Morahan
- Children: Seven
- Education: Rockland Community College
- Profession: Politician

Thomas P. Morahan (October 11, 1931 – July 12, 2010) was a member of the New York State Senate, for the 38th district covering all of Rockland County and parts of Orange County, New York. He was first elected in a special election in 1999.

Morahan, after winning the November 4th elections, was serving his sixth term at the time of his death in 2010, though he had announced his retirement at the end of the term due to age and leukemia (which ultimately caused his death).

== Life ==
Thomas Morahan was born in the Bronx. After graduating from high school, he attended Rockland Community College. The state senator began his government service as a member of the Clarkstown Zoning Board of Appeals. In 1977, he was elected as a Rockland County Legislator. He was a member of the New York State Assembly (96th D.) in 1981 and 1982. He returned to the Rockland County Legislature in 1984. In 1996, he was elected unanimously to serve as Chairman of the Rockland County Legislature. In 1999, he campaigned for position as New York State Senator for the 38th senatorial district. After winning, served five terms, and won reelection for a sixth term in 2008. While in political office, Morahan served on the Orange and Rockland Utilities Board as a Community Relations Manager, from 1990 to 1996.

Morahan was identified as a 'very liberal' Republican, within the 2% most liberal Republicans in the New York State Legislature.

== Organizations ==
Morahan was an active member in promoting avocations for citizens with mental disabilities. He was member of the American Organization for Retarded Citizens, which raises funds for solutions for autism and other issues. The state senator was also actively involved in Big Brothers, Big Sisters, as well as the New City Rotary Club. He served on the agricultural, educational, homeland security, and mental health committees. Morahan visited and supported veterans' organizations, specifically those of the Korean War {where he served in the army} and the Second World War.

== Legislation ==
On May 25, 1999, Morahan was elected to fill a vacancy in the State Senate. Morahan sponsored and co-sponsored several pieces of legislation involving promoting awareness for citizens with special needs. He helped pass the Veterans' Buyback Law, which allowed veterans to easily deal with mortgages and retirement issues. He sponsored and voted for strengthening Sexual Assault Laws, which increase the sentences for those charged with harassment. He co-sponsored Jonathon's Law, which entitles parents and legal guardians access to all child abuse investigation files and medical history records. Public Safety programs were specifically of Morahan's interest, of which he seeks to pass more laws to solve important issues. He supports donating money to Nyack Hospital for its Breast Cancer Center, as well as Emergency Preparedness Training at Rockland Community College. Morahan voted against same-sex marriage legislation on December 2, 2009, and the bill was defeated.

== Illness and death ==
Morahan died on July 12, 2010, at the age of 78. Prior to his death, he had fought a six-month battle with leukemia.

== See also ==
- 2009 New York State Senate leadership crisis

New York State Assembly
Preceded by Robert J. Connor	New York State Assembly; 96th District; 1981–1982	Succeeded by Lawrence E. Bennett
New York State Senate
Preceded by Joseph R. Holland	New York State Senate; 38th District; 1999–2010	Succeeded by David Carlucci
Preceded by Shirley Huntley	New York State Senate; Chairman of the Committee on Mental Health and Developmental Disabilities; 2010	Succeeded by Roy J. McDonald
