= North Main Street School =

Historic school building in New York, US

- U.S. National Register of Historic Places
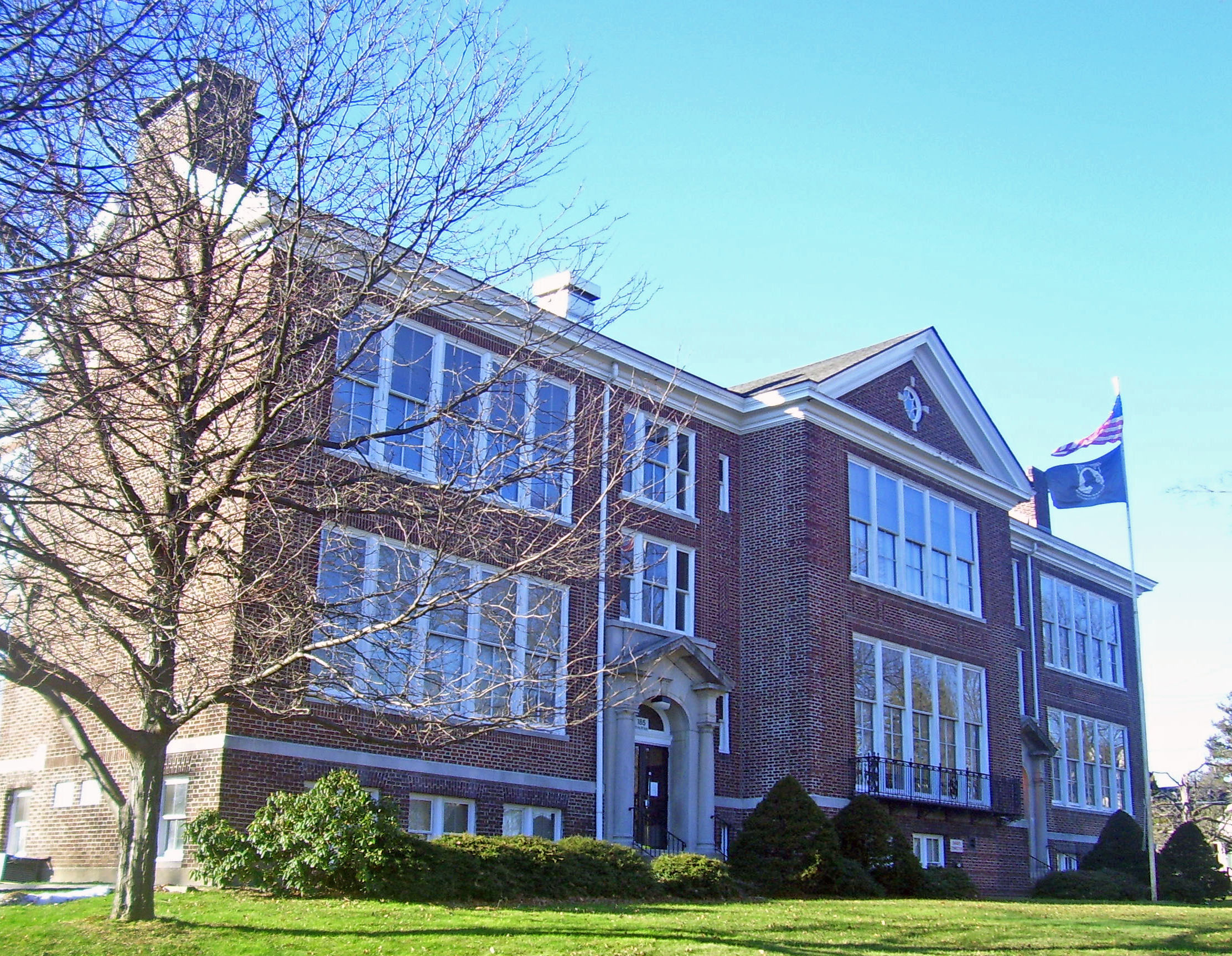
- Partial south profile and east elevation, 2008

- Location within New York Location within the United States
- Location: Spring Valley, NY
- Nearest city: Hackensack, NJ
- Coordinates: 41°7′15″N 74°2′35.4″W
- Area: 2.5 acres (1.0 ha)
- Built: 1916
- Architect: Sibley, E. & A.H. Knapp; et al.
- Architectural style: Colonial Revival
- NRHP reference No.: 08000105
- Added to NRHP: February 28, 2008

The North Main Street School is located on that street (also New York State Route 45) in Spring Valley, New York, United States. It is a brick Colonial Revival building erected in the early 20th century in response to a rapidly increasing school population. Several times since then, it has been expanded. It remained in active use until the 1970s.

It is an intact example of one of the early modern schools in the region. A proposal to demolish it in the mid-1980s met with widespread public opposition, and it has since been reused as a satellite campus of Rockland Community College. In 2008 it was listed on the National Register of Historic Places.

== Building ==
The school is located on a 2.5-acre (1.0 ha) lot on the west side of North Main a half-mile (1 km) north of downtown Spring Valley, at the southwest corner with Linden Avenue and opposite Ewing Avenue. The area is heavily developed, with most of the nearby properties along North Main being similarly large commercial or institutional buildings such as the Salvation Army building to the south and the large strip mall to the northeast. To the north and west, along Linden and South Orchard Street respectively, there are houses.

Along the east (front) side of the building is a broad lawn with mature trees and a sidewalk. Parking lots fill out the property on the south and west. Sidewalks line North Main and Linden.

=== Exterior ===
The building itself is a two-story square-shaped brick building with an enclosed courtyard in the middle. The main block, oriented north-south along North Main, has a side-gabled roof shingled in asphalt, pierced by engaged brick chimneys at the ends and aluminum air handlers in the middle. A central pavilion projects slightly from the facade. Similarly treated wings project to the west from its north and south ends. A single-story flat-roofed west wing forms the southwest corner of the courtyard.

The brick is generally laid in Flemish bond. Quoins five courses high accentuate the outer corners. Stacked bond and double rowlocks accentuate the window openings on the first and second stories, with the bricks between the window spans slightly recessed. The smaller exposed basement windows have brick lintels and concrete sills.

Stone is used for the water table, except on the chimneys where it is replaced by stacked brick, and the sills on the upper windows. A cornerstone at the northeast reads "1916". The window strips themselves, trimmed in wood, are units of five tall four-over-four double-hing sash windows on the upper two stories and shorter two-over-two at the basement. The northernmost window unit on the basement has been bricked in.

The pavilion is flanked by identical entrance porticos. The entrances themselves have cast stone surrounds with Tuscan columns and open pediments with partial returns. Concrete steps with cast iron railings lead up to a pair of double glazed doors topped by a leaded glass fanlight. Fenestration above the entrances consists of tripartite windows o two-over-two flanked by one-over-one, with narrow one-over-one in the space between those windows and the pavilion corners in order to illuminate an interior stairwell. Brick between the stories is in a herringbone pattern.

The pavilion is topped by a pediment above the molded raking cornice which marks the roofline. It has an oculus with rowlocks and keystones in the middle. Below it are window strips similar to the large ones on either side. A balcony supported by brackets with wrought iron balustrade decorated with the script letters "S" and "V" projects from the first story.

Other than small three-over-three windows flanking the chimneys at the basement level, there are no windows on either north or south elevation. The rear of the main block is now one of the courtyard walls. It is now bowed, with a shed roof projecting from the first story.

The two wings are similar to the main block in materials, decoration and fenestration. Their rear elevations, now facing onto the courtyard, have paired and single two-over-two windows shorter at the basement. An engaged elevator tower rises from the north wing's rear at the northwest corner of the courtyard. It is constructed of masonry block painted to match the brick.

On the west elevation of the west wing are Palladian windows with fluted pilasters dividing the taller windows from the shorter ones. Its entrance, on the small north arm, has a glass door with a curved broken pediment and sidelight. The roof parapet is topped by brown stone coping.

=== Interior ===
Much of the interior's finishes are original. Some changes have been made to the layout with the addition of the other wings, or to create a library through the removal of partitions on the first floor of the main block. The hallways have linoleum floors and dark red brick wainscoting to a height of five feet (1.5 m). Above them are plaster walls. The basement kitchen has its original ceramic tile walls and stainless steel trim. A commemorative plaque is located in the north corridor of that wing with the names of the school board, staff, architects and contractor from that wing's construction. The rooms combined into a library feature crown molding and a fireplace in an alcove with a frieze depicting geese. A wooden mantle with decorative molding and modillions spans the fireplace and flanks the recessed bookshelves.

The Palladian windows light the gym, also used for assemblies, with its original hardwood floor. The stage has its original red velvet curtain, with elaborate moldings on the sides. It is topped with a molded broken pediment decorated with grillwork and urn-shaped finials.

== History ==
Following decades of growth after the New York and Erie Railroad was opened through the area in 1841, Spring Valley was incorporated as a village in 1902. By then it was the second-most populous place in the county. Growth continued, and by 1915 the local schools were overcrowded to the point that students were taking classes in the local firehouse.

A special meeting was held late that year to resolve the situation. It ended with a vote to create an eight-room grammar school on the north side of the village. Almost one-tenth of the estimated $35,000 ($1,114,000 in contemporary dollars.) cost went to acquiring the land. Architect Ernest Sibley of New Jersey was commissioned to design the building, and the present main block was opened a year later. Depending on the schedule, its four classrooms housed either kindergarten through fourth grade or four kindergarten and first grade classes.

Two purchases of adjoining parcels from the original landowners made it possible for the school district to expand the school in 1930 with eight new classrooms, the auditorium and cafeteria in the north wing. Tooker & Marsh of New York City were the architects this time, producing a structure compatible with the main block. The south wing came almost three decades later, after Spring Valley's schools, once again facing an influx of students with the suburbanization of the area after construction of the Tappan Zee Bridge and the post–World War II baby boom, were consolidated into the Ramapo Central School District No. 2 in 1952. Schofield & Cogan designed the south wing, which opened in 1957, and more land was purchased to accommodate future expansions, if necessary.

Enrollment peaked in 1971, and what was now the East Ramapo Central School District sold the building to the county six years later for use by Rockland Community College. It was renamed the Spring Valley Learning Center. In 1986, the county legislature recommended that the building, called a "white elephant" with little usable space by one college administrator, be demolished and replaced with a newer, smaller building. Public outcry instead led the county to remodel it at a cost of $1.9 million, and it reopened in 1993 with a new heating system and without the asbestos in its walls and ceilings.

== See also ==
- National Register of Historic Places listings in Rockland County, New York
