= Edward Salyer House =

Historic house in New York, United States

- U.S. National Register of Historic Places
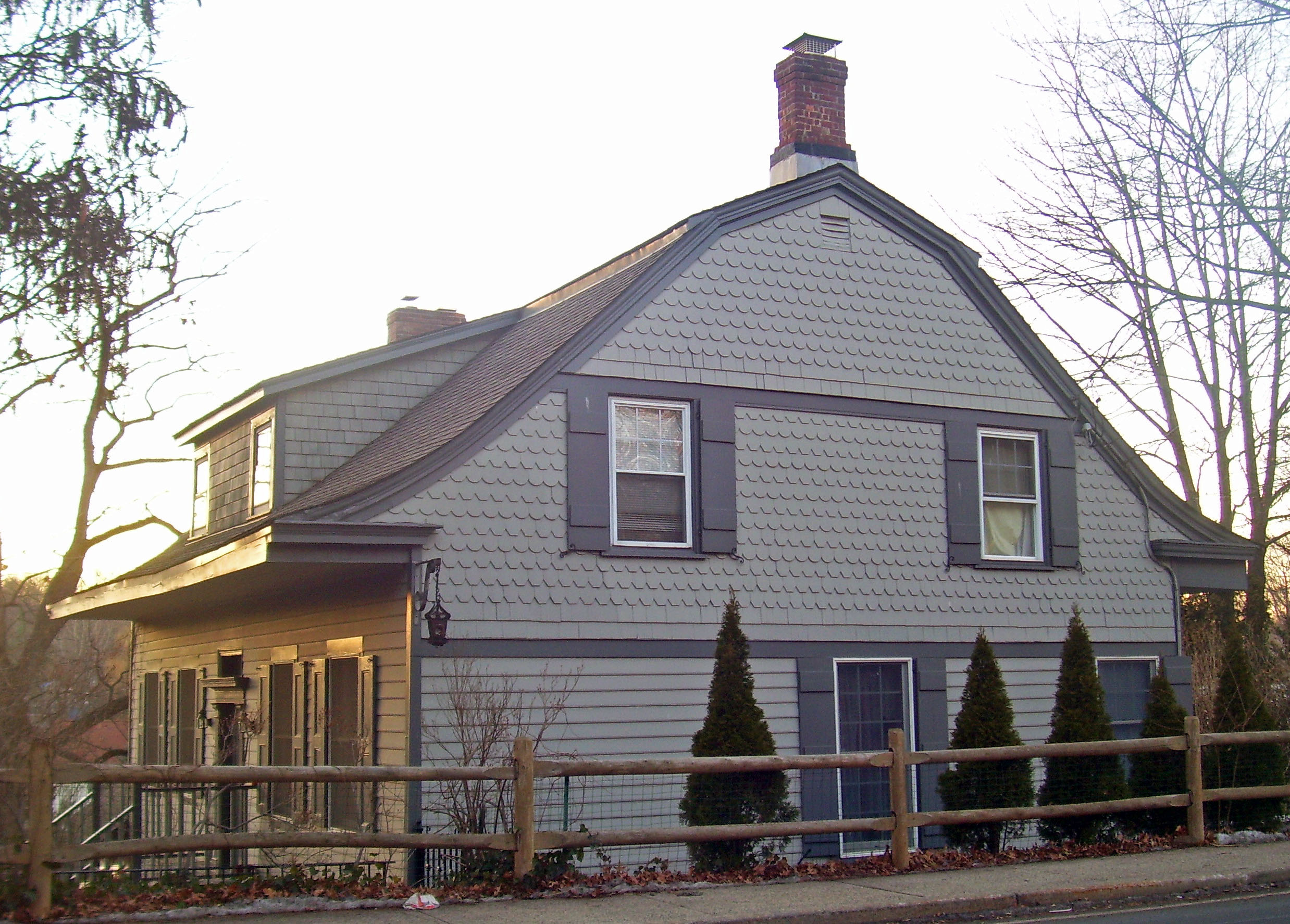
- South (front) elevation and east profile, 2008

- Location within New York Location within the United States
- Interactive map showing the location for Slayer House
- Location: Pearl River, NY
- Nearest city: Paterson, NJ
- Coordinates: 41°3′5″N 74°0′49″W
- Area: 0.5 acres (2,000 m^{2})
- Built: 1765
- Architect: Edward Salyer
- Architectural style: Colonial, Dutch Colonial
- NRHP reference No.: 86002178
- Added to NRHP: September 4, 1986

The Edward Salyer House is located on South Middletown Road in Pearl River, New York, United States. It is a wood frame house built in the 1760s.

Originally it was the main house of a farm that covered much of that neighborhood. It is one of the rare remaining Dutch Colonial frame houses in the county, and possibly the oldest house in Pearl River. It retains much of its integrity, including original interior finishes and exterior hardware, despite renovations in the 19th and 20th centuries. In 1986 it and its well, also original to the property, were listed on the National Register of Historic Places.

== Buildings and grounds ==
The house is located on the west side of the street, two lots south of the Gilbert Avenue (Rockland County Route 20) intersection and one quarter-mile (400 m) north of the New Jersey state line. It sits near the front, closer to the street than the other houses in the area, of its half-acre (2,000 m^{2}) lot, divided from similar residential properties to the north and south on South Middletown and the west on Kerry Court, a small cul-de-sac off Gilbert, by rows of tall, mature deciduous trees. The neighborhood is exclusively residential, mostly suburban houses built in the late 20th century, on smaller lots.

There are two other outbuildings on the property, a wellhouse and shed. The lot slopes down significantly toward the west through landscaped gardens and a footpath. A large black walnut and evergreens are planted among them.

=== Exterior ===
The building itself is a two-and-a-half-story five-by-five-bay structure on a fieldstone foundation 18 inches (46 cm) thick. The slope of the underlying land exposes eight feet (2.4 m) of the foundation on the west side, giving it the appearance of an extra story. It is sided in clapboard with narrow corner boards and scale-shaped shingles in the apexes of the gambrel roof, shingled in wood and pierced by corbeled brick chimneys at either end and a shed dormer window on the south.

It is oriented perpendicular to the street, with its south facade serving as the front. A wooden staircase with a slatted balustrade climbs to the main entrance, in the center of the facade. It is flanked by two six-over-six double-hung sash windows on either side with paneled wooden shutters. The roof's overhanging eave runs the length of the facade. The symmetry of the front is in contrast with the asymmetrical fenestration on the side elevations, with the first floor's two windows on the east facade occupying the middle and northern bays and the upper story windows in the bays not used below them. A variety of window patterns are in use, including a rare 12-over-12 single-hung sash. Some have original wrought iron hardware.

On the west profile is a rear entrance, a paneled Dutch door added later. A one-story frame wing with steep gabled roof and picture windows projects from that side, and it has a wooden patio on its own west. The basement of the north side is mostly covered by an embankment.

=== Interior ===
The recessed main entrance is surrounded by wide pilasters supporting a full entablature above a three-paned transom with molded wood trim. It opens into a center hall dividing the building. In the front are a parlor and dining room, both with Federal style fireplaces with fluted pilasters and molded wood trim over brick and stone hearths. In the dining room a molded cupboard with glass doors and shelves flanks the fireplace. The rear has a bedroom, study and bathroom.

Interior of the house ( first floor)

On the floors are wood planks of random widths and lengths fastened to the joists by handwrought nails. The walls are plaster over the early clay and straw insulation. The door and window surrounds are molded wood, varying in their level of decoration. A few original wrought iron thumb latches remain in the doors. Some original fabrics can be found.

An enclosed stairway leads up to the second story. There, a wider central hall separates three bedrooms and a bathroom. The floors are also random plank; the ceilings are low, about 6 feet 11 inches (2.1 m). Another set of stairs leads to the attic, where adzed beams and numbered, pegged roof framing are visible along with the change in chimney materials.

Stairway leading to second floor.

The basement level is divided between an unfinished half on the east and the original kitchen and common room on the west. There is evidence of a jambless fireplace in the former kitchen, and the outline of the old beehive oven on its stone wall behind the fireplace. That has its original wooden Federal mantel, supported by tapered pilasters. All door and window openings in the thick stone walls taper up as well. Modern pine wainscoting and a herringbone patterned brick floor have been added. The original storage room hosts a modern kitchen facility.

Cellar/foundations

=== Outbuildings ===
At the southwest corner of the house is a wellhouse, a modern frame structure. It shelters an original well four feet (1.3 m) wide and 20 feet (6.1 m) deep, sided in fieldstone stacked without mortar. It is complemented by a frame toolshed at the northeast corner with a gabled roof and clapboard siding.

The toolshed and wellhouse are architecturally sympathetic to the house. As they are of modern construction they are not considered contributing resources to the Register listing. The well itself dates to the property's early years as a farmhouse and is therefore a contributing structure.

== History ==
Records from surveys done to establish the colonial boundary near the end of the New York-New Jersey Line War in 1769 note the house, and suggest that it was relatively new. Contemporary records related to the Kakiat Patent, a colonial land grant that covered not only portions of what is today Rockland County but also Bergen County, New Jersey, to the south, also support that assumption, leading to the estimated construction date of 1765. Edward Salyer Sr., believed to have built it and lived there, bought the 30 acres (12 ha) in the area as part of the patent's Great Lot 21.

The house has many features of the vernacular architecture of Dutch settlers and their descendants in the region. Among these are the gambrel roof with full-width overhanging eave, restrained decor and center hall floor plan. Less common are the Dutch door with original hardware and single-hung sash window. The house is also one of the few surviving frame houses from that era; most of its contemporaries that remain are built of dressed sandstone.

Salyer later acquired an additional 72 acres (29 ha) from John Suffern, founder of the nearby village that bears his name. Edward Salyer died April 10, 1819- aged 59 years and 8 months. The year of his wife's death is not known, but at some point Edward Salyer Jr. inherited the land. At some point, the property lost 12 acres (4.9 ha), since at the younger man's sale of the property in 1818 the total holding is recorded at 90 acres (36 ha).

Tunis Cooper, the new owner, in turn sold it to Cornelius Demarest in 1837. By this point the Federal style interior detailing had probably been added. The Demarests added some Greek Revival elements of their own, such as the door and window surrounds, around 1840, in a similar attempt to bring the house in keeping with contemporary trends. They sold it themselves in 1851.

From then on, it passed through a series of owners for the rest of the 19th century. At one point full length columns were added to front to create a veranda. No changes were made to the interior layout.

In 1960, the Conques family acquired the home. They restored its original appearance by removing the columns. Inside they upgraded and modernized the kitchen. In 1980, they built the wellhouse and toolshed. There have been no other significant changes to the property since then.

== See also ==
- National Register of Historic Places listings in Rockland County, New York
