= Brian Gaine =

American football executive

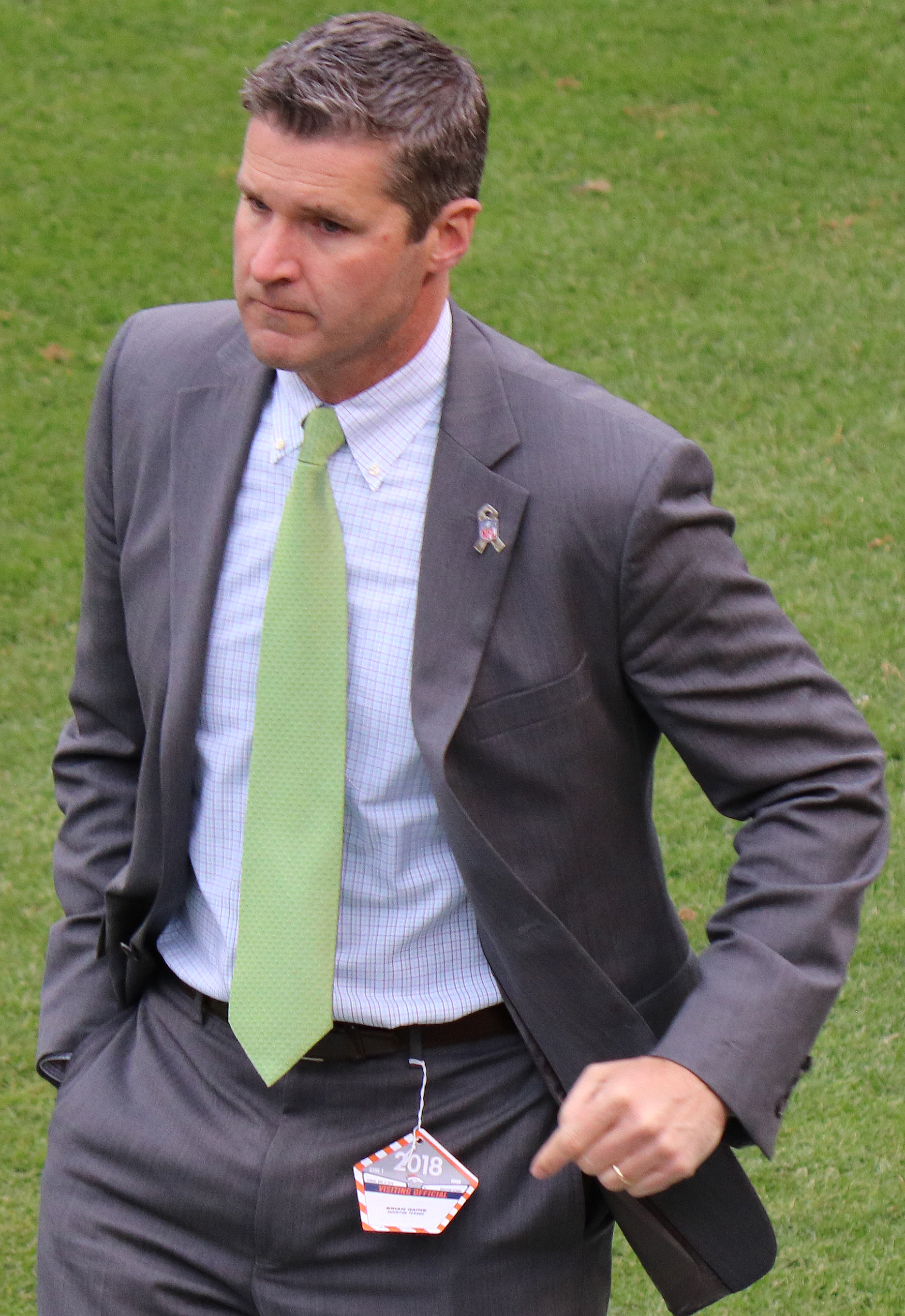
- Gaine with the Houston Texans in 2018

Buffalo Bills
- Title: Assistant general manager

Personal information
- Born: Pearl River, New York, U.S.

Career information
- Position: Tight end
- High school: Don Bosco Prep
- College: Maine
- NFL draft: 1995: undrafted

Career history

Playing
- New York Jets (1996)*; New York Giants (1997)*; Kansas City Chiefs (1998)*
- * Offseason or practice squad member only

Operations
- New York Jets (1999–2004) Scout; Dallas Cowboys (2005–2007) Assistant director of pro scouting; Miami Dolphins (2008–2013); Assistant director of player personnel (2008-2010); Director of player personnel (2011); Assistant general manager (2012-2013); Houston Texans (2014–2016) Director of player personnel; Buffalo Bills (2017) Vice president of player personnel; Houston Texans (2018–2019) General manager; Buffalo Bills (2019-present); Senior personnel advisor (2019-2021); Assistant general manager (2022-present)
- Executive profile at Pro Football Reference

Brian Gaine is an American football executive who works as the assistant general manager for the Buffalo Bills of the National Football League (NFL). He served as the general manager of the Houston Texans from 2018 to 2019. Gaine began his executive career in 1999 with the New York Jets as a scout and worked in the scouting departments of the Bills, Texans, Miami Dolphins and Dallas Cowboys.

== Early life and education ==
Gaine was born to Jim and Alice Gaine, both immigrants from Ireland, and is the youngest of five brothers. Raised in Pearl River, New York, he attended Don Bosco Preparatory High School in Ramsey, New Jersey, where he played tight end on the school's football team. He is a member of the school's Hall of Fame. Gaine attended college at the University of Maine, and played for the Maine Black Bears football team.

== Playing career ==
After going undrafted in the 1995 NFL draft, Gaine signed with the New York Jets and spent time on the team's practice squad throughout the season. Gaine also spent time with the New York Giants in 1996, and the Kansas City Chiefs in 1997, but did not appear in a game after spending each year on the practice squad.

== Executive career ==
After Gaine's playing career ended, he was hired as a scout by the New York Jets in 1999, and worked in that capacity for the team until 2004. After his tenure with the Jets, Gaine became the assistant director of pro scouting for the Dallas Cowboys, a role he held from 2005 to 2007.

After Cowboys' head coach Bill Parcells, who Gaine has cited as one of his biggest influences, retired from coaching and took an executive position with the Miami Dolphins, Gaine followed him and was named the assistant director of pro personnel of the team. While Parcells left the team after the 2010 season, Gaine stayed with the team until 2013, becoming director of player personnel in 2011 and assistant general manager in 2012.

Gaine was hired by the Houston Texans for the first time in 2014, and worked as the team's director of player personnel for three seasons. Prior to the 2017 season, Gaine was hired in the same capacity by the Buffalo Bills, and spent one season in Buffalo.

Gaine was hired as the Texans's general manager in January 2018 after the previous general manager, Rick Smith, took a leave of absence. On June 7, 2019, Gaine was fired by the Texans after only one season as GM. His firing took place after a former security coordinator filed a complaint with the Equal Employment Opportunity Commission which stated that Gaine had targeted African-American employees for dismissal. The Texans organization stated that the complaint was unrelated to the decision to fire Gaine. Later, Buffalo Bills general manager Brandon Beane, after hiring Gaine in a different capacity, described the allegations as "baseless".

On July 23, 2019, Gaine was rehired by the Bills as a senior personnel advisor. On June 7, 2022, he was promoted to assistant general manager of the Bills.
