= Saint Margaret School (Pearl River, New York) =

Coordinates: 41°3′33.8″N 74°1′37.3″W

Saint Margaret School is a pre-Kindergarten through 8th-grade Elementary Catholic School in Pearl River, New York. It has been serving Rockland County's school districts since 1953. The school is known for its music program; students performed at the Lincoln Center in 2009.

== History ==
The church of St. Margaret of Antioch was built in 1900 and replaced in 1931 after a 1929 fire. Saint Margaret School was organized in 1953 by Pastor Michael Toner and the Dominican sisters of Blauvelt, with classes for grades 1 through 4 being offered that year in temporary quarters and a new building with 8 classrooms and a gymnasium being dedicated by Cardinal Spellman the following year. An addition with 8 more classrooms and a cafeteria was completed in 1960.

More than 3,000 students have graduated from Saint Margaret. Enrollment is currently maintained at approximately 300, 95% from the parish. 99% are Roman Catholic. The balance of the sexes is roughly even. More than 95% who enroll in Grade 1 remain in the school through Grade 8.

The school is administered by the principal under the supervision of the pastor. The first principal was Sr. Mary Blanch, O.P., succeeded by other members of the Dominican sisters of Blauvelt. The current principal is Patricia Maldonado and the current pastor Father Raaser.

Saint Margaret School was accredited by the Middle States Association of Colleges and Schools in 1995, reaccredited in 2000, and reviewed in 2006.

In 2010 the 6th grade CYO basketball team won the state title.

== Academics ==
Saint Margaret School follows the current curriculum guidelines of the Roman Catholic Archdiocese of New York and the New York State Board of Regents. Students in Grades 1 through 8 take the Iowa Tests of Basic Skills annually.

Students in Kindergarten through Grade 4 are taught in self-contained classroom settings, with the homeroom teacher responsible for all subjects. Grades 5 through 8 are departmentalized, with 4 teachers in Social Studies, Science, Language Arts, and Mathematics. In addition to the core subjects, each class has a "special" weekly class of Music, Art, computers, Physical Education, and Spanish. 7th and 8th graders study Spanish twice a week, and 8th graders study advanced mathematics before the regular school day begins.

All classes study religion with the homeroom teacher and attend mass or prayer services in the church and chapel, and a parish priest regularly visits the classrooms.
