= Pearl River, New York =

Pearl River
- Census-designated place
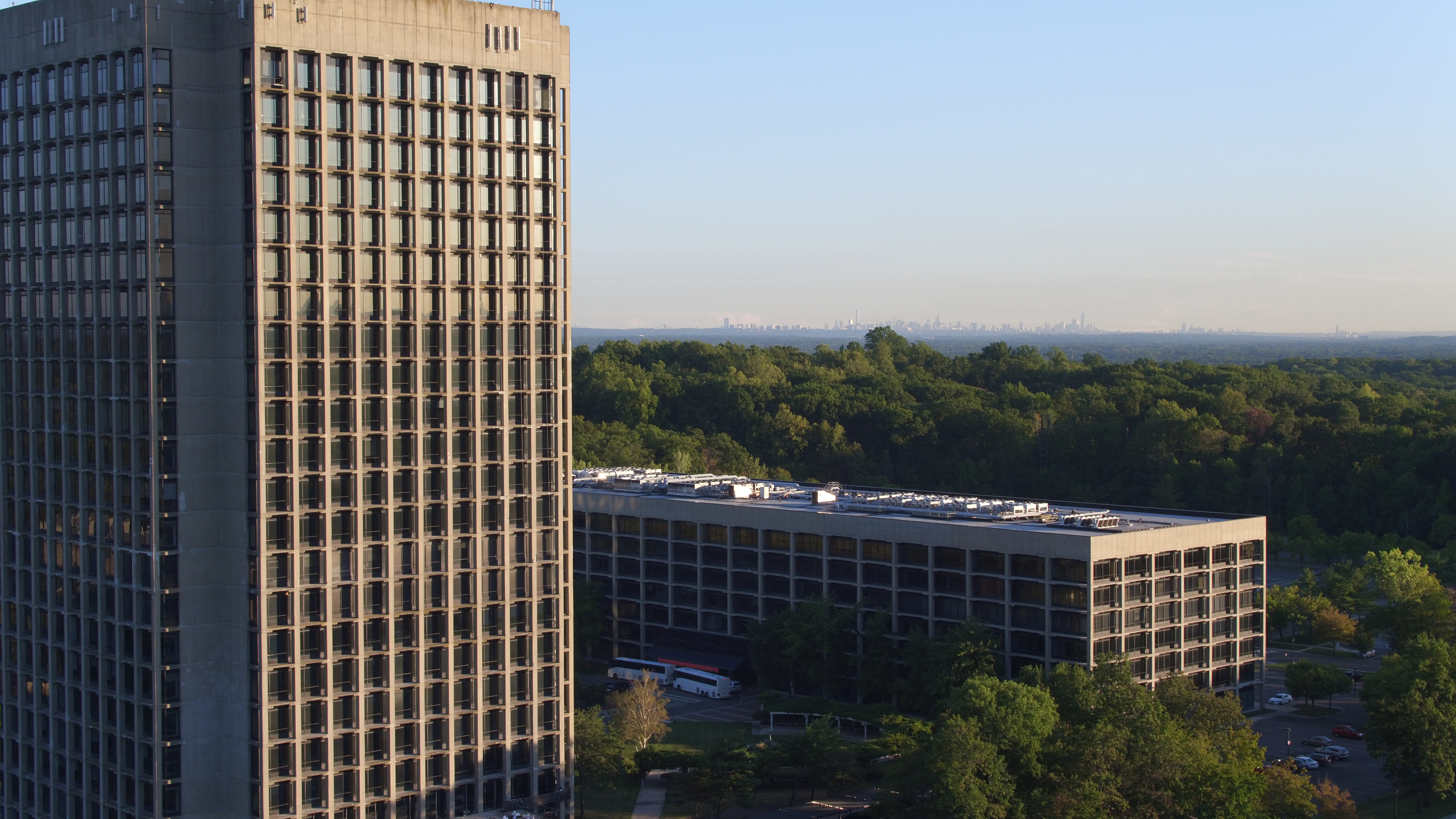
- The Blue Hill Plaza office tower, with the Manhattan skyline visible in the distance

- Location in Rockland County and the state of New York

- Location within the state of New York
- Coordinates: 41°3′32.8″N 74°1′12.9″W
- Country: United States
- State: New York
- County: Rockland
- Town: Orangetown

Area
  - Total: 7.19 sq mi (18.63 km^{2})
  - Land: 6.79 sq mi (17.59 km^{2})
  - Water: 0.40 sq mi (1.03 km^{2})
- Elevation: 240 ft (73 m)

Population (2020)
  - Total: 16,567
  - Density: 2,438.7/sq mi (941.59/km^{2})
- Time zone: UTC-5 (Eastern (EST))
  - Summer (DST): UTC-4 (EDT)
- ZIP code: 10965
- Area code: 845
- FIPS code: 36-56902
- GNIS feature ID: 0960056

Pearl River is a hamlet and census-designated place in the town of Orangetown, Rockland County, New York, United States. It is east of Chestnut Ridge, south of Nanuet, west of Blauvelt, New York, and north of Montvale and Old Tappan, New Jersey. The population was 16,567 at the 2020 United States census.

Pearl River is 20 miles (32 km) north of Midtown Manhattan. Pearl River station is located on the New Jersey Transit's Pascack Valley Line.

== History ==
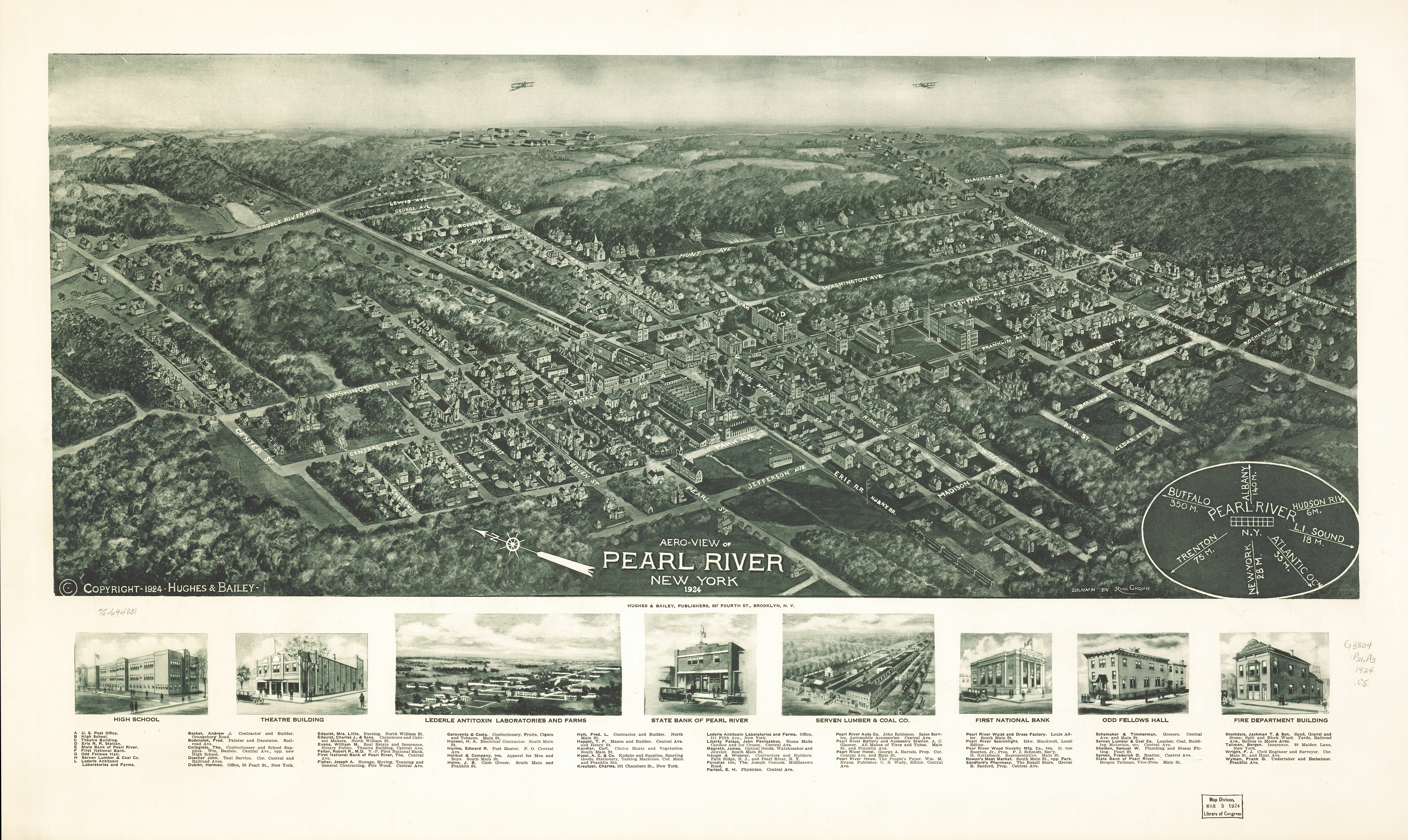
Panoramic map of Pearl River from 1924 with list of landmarks and images of several inset

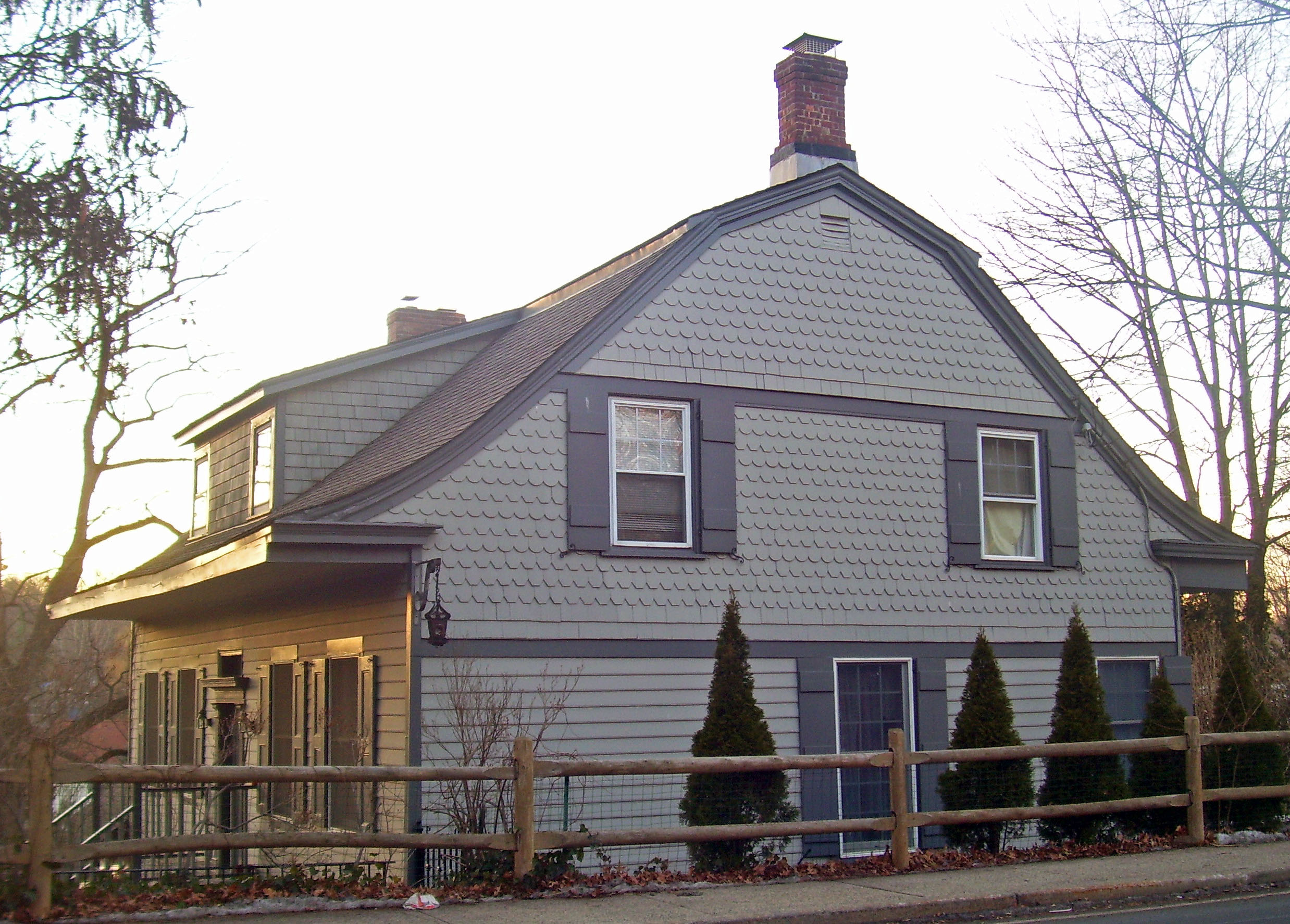
Edward Salyer House on South Middletown Road in Pearl River

Edward Salyer House (also known as Sickles house) building plan (6 of 10)

In 1696, Pearl River was part of a larger piece of land known as the Kakiat Patent that was granted to Daniel Honan and Michael Hawdon. In 1713, the land was split into north and south plots. After the Revolutionary War, the land was further divided and sold. Pearl River was a piece of land made up of woods and swamps originally called Muddy Creek.

In the early 1870s, the town was divided into five different parts: Middletown, Sickletown, Pascack, Muddy Brook, and Naurashaun.

There are conflicting accounts on how Muddy Creek came to be named Pearl River. According to some historians, a town resident named Ves Bogert found small pearls in mussels that thrived in Muddy Brook and, upon hearing this, the wife of John Demarest, the president of the New Jersey and New York Railroad, suggested the name "Pearl River" to him.

Another account is that the name change was made to make the station sound more appealing on railroad schedules. A third account is that Julius E. Braunsdorf wanted to enhance the hamlet's business image by renaming it Pearl River. In any event, there is no body of water near the hamlet called Pearl River; the most significant stream is Muddy Brook.

Julius E. Braunsdorf, an industrialist and German immigrant, purchased Muddy Creek in 1870. He donated a long strip of land through the center of his property to the New Jersey and New York Railroad to enable it to bring an extension of the line from Hillsdale, New Jersey north to Nanuet.

Braunsdorf was the "Father of Pearl River" and established Aetna Sewing Machine Company to produce his patented home sewing machine in 1872. Later that year the first post office was established in the hamlet and from then on it was known as Pearl River.

Braunsdorf invented and manufactured the carbon-arc light bulb in 1873, six years before Thomas Edison's carbonized filament version. It was installed and used on ships in New York harbor for loading and unloading operations. He also designed generators, one of which powered the first incandescent electric lights, which he also invented, in the nation's capital.

When Braunsdorf designed the street layout, the only existing streets were Pearl Street and Washington Avenue. He drew a wide main street through the middle of town and called it Central Avenue. Parallel to Central Avenue he drew Franklin, after his hero, Benjamin Franklin. To connect Washington, Central, and Franklin he drew three streets and named them William, John and Henry, after his sons.

Braunsdorf built:

- 1872 – The Aetna Sewing Machine Company, the largest factory in Pearl River, and ceded land to the railroad company so workers from New York City could get to his factory.
- 1872 – The Pearl River Post Office and became the first Postmaster.
- 1873 – Two brick train stations (passenger/freight) still in use today.
- The Pearl River Hotel
- Low-cost housing for the factory employees he attracted from Germany and Scandinavia.

In 1894, Talbot C. Dexter moved his Dexter Folder Company to Pearl River. On August 25, 1885, Dexter filed a patent for an automatic folding machine that changed the way newspapers, books, and magazines were folded and assembled. Between 1885 and 1913, Dexter filed many patents, some still in use today.

In 1907, Ernst J. Lederle, former New York City Health Commissioner, established the Lederle Antitoxin Laboratories in Pearl River. In 1930, it became Lederle Laboratories, a division of American Cyanamid. During World War II, Lederle was a major supplier of vaccines and blood plasma to the U.S. armed forces.

In 1931, Gottfried (Fred) Schmidt invented the automatic pinsetter. Brunswick was not interested in an automatic machine at the time. In 1937, AMF acquired the patent rights to this early machine—The “Sch-Bec-Roy”, which stood for Schmidt (inventor), Beckerle (bowling alley proprietor) and McElroy (blueprint designer).

In 1955, Pearl River was the setting for Norby, an NBC situation comedy that aired from January to April of that year and was one of the first regular television series filmed in color. It starred David Wayne as a small-town banker who lived and worked in Pearl River, where the 13 episodes of the series were filmed.

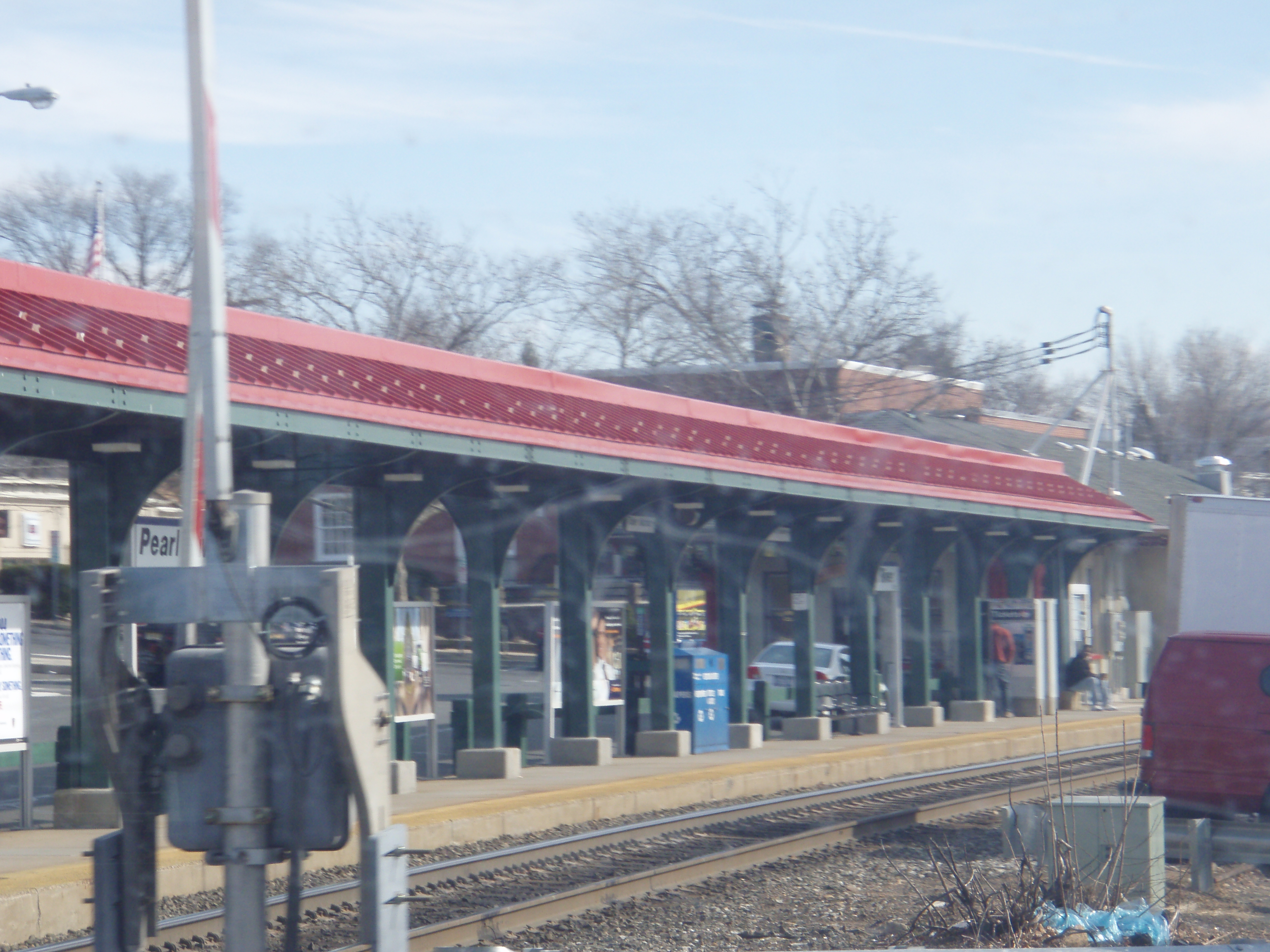
Pearl River Metro-North station

== Geography ==
According to the United States Census Bureau, the CDP has an area of 7.2 square miles (19 km^{2}), of which 6.8 square miles (18 km^{2}) is land and 0.3 square miles (0.78 km^{2}), or 4.87%, is water.

== Demographics ==
Historical population
Census	Pop.	Note	%±
2020	16,567		—
U.S. Decennial Census

=== 2020 census ===
As of the 2020 census, Pearl River had a population of 16,567. The median age was 44.4 years. 21.6% of residents were under the age of 18 and 20.3% of residents were 65 years of age or older. For every 100 females there were 95.1 males, and for every 100 females age 18 and over there were 92.2 males age 18 and over.

100.0% of residents lived in urban areas, while 0.0% lived in rural areas.

There were 5,930 households in Pearl River, of which 31.6% had children under the age of 18 living in them. Of all households, 59.4% were married-couple households, 14.2% were households with a male householder and no spouse or partner present, and 22.9% were households with a female householder and no spouse or partner present. About 23.8% of all households were made up of individuals and 12.8% had someone living alone who was 65 years of age or older.

There were 6,149 housing units, of which 3.6% were vacant. The homeowner vacancy rate was 0.8% and the rental vacancy rate was 3.8%.

Racial composition as of the 2020 census
Race	Number	Percent
White	13,974	84.3%
Black or African American	259	1.6%
American Indian and Alaska Native	28	0.2%
Asian	661	4.0%
Native Hawaiian and Other Pacific Islander	2	0.0%
Some other race	677	4.1%
Two or more races	966	5.8%
Hispanic or Latino (of any race)	1,677	10.1%

=== 2000 census ===
As of the 2000 census, there were 21,042 people, 5,539 households, and 4,209 families residing in the CDP. The population density was 3,273.2 inhabitants per square mile (1,263.8/km^{2}). There were 5,636 housing units at an average density of 823.8 per square mile (318.1/km^{2}). The racial makeup of the CDP was 72.37% White, 6.39% African American, 0.05% Native American, 7.16% Asian, 0.02% Pacific Islander, 0.57% from other races, and 0.68% from two or more races. Hispanic or Latino of any race were 6.44% of the population.

There were 5,539 households, out of which 33.6% had children under the age of 18 living with them, 64.4% were married couples living together, 8.4% had a female householder with no husband present, and 24.0% were non-families. 20.7% of all households were made up of individuals, and 8.3% had someone living alone who was 65 years of age or older. The average household size was 2.79 and the average family size was 3.26.

In the CDP, the population was spread out, with 25.3% under the age of 18, 6.0% from 18 to 24, 29.3% from 25 to 44, 24.7% from 45 to 64, and 14.6% who were 65 years of age or older. The median age was 39 years. For every 100 females, there were 93.6 males. For every 100 females age 18 and over, there were 91.3 males.

The median income for a household in the CDP was $76,692, and the median income for a family was $91,618. Males had a median income of $58,966 versus $39,452 for females. The per capita income for the CDP was $31,417. About 2.2% of families and 3.4% of the population were below the poverty line, including 3.1% of those under age 18 and 4.7% of those age 65 or over.

=== Ethnic communities ===
Pearl River has large Jewish and Irish communities. Under the auspices of the Ancient Order of Hibernians, hosts New York State's second-largest Saint Patrick's Day parade, typically on the Sunday after St. Patrick's Day. This large Irish-American population also supports the nation's largest youth Gaelic Athletic Football team.

== Economy ==
Lederle Laboratories (which became Wyeth) was founded in 1907 on a Pearl River farm by Ernst J. Lederle. The site grew to encompass 550 acres (2.2 km^{2}) and 40 buildings, and employ 4,000 workers. After Pfizer acquired Wyeth in 2009, the number of employees at the site was greatly reduced, and most of the campus was sold in the mid-2010s. This is also the location where the Pfizer COVID vaccine was tested and first created. Streets and a pond on the campus are named after scientists and inventors:

- Addison Road
- Banting Way
- Bayliss Road
- Cushing Road
- Curie Way, named after
  - Pierre and Marie Curie
- Darwin Road
- Draper Way
- Duggar Way
- Ewing Way
- Finlay Way
- Gorgas Way
- Gray Road
- Harvey Way
- Imhoff Road
- Jansen Road
- Jenner Place
- Koch Way
- Lederle Road, named after
  - Ernst J. Lederle
- Morton Road
- Pasteur Road
- Ramon Road
- Reed Pond
- Watt Place

Pearl River is the site of Blue Hill Plaza, an office complex that includes Rockland County's first commercial skyscraper, completed in 1972.

== Arts and culture ==
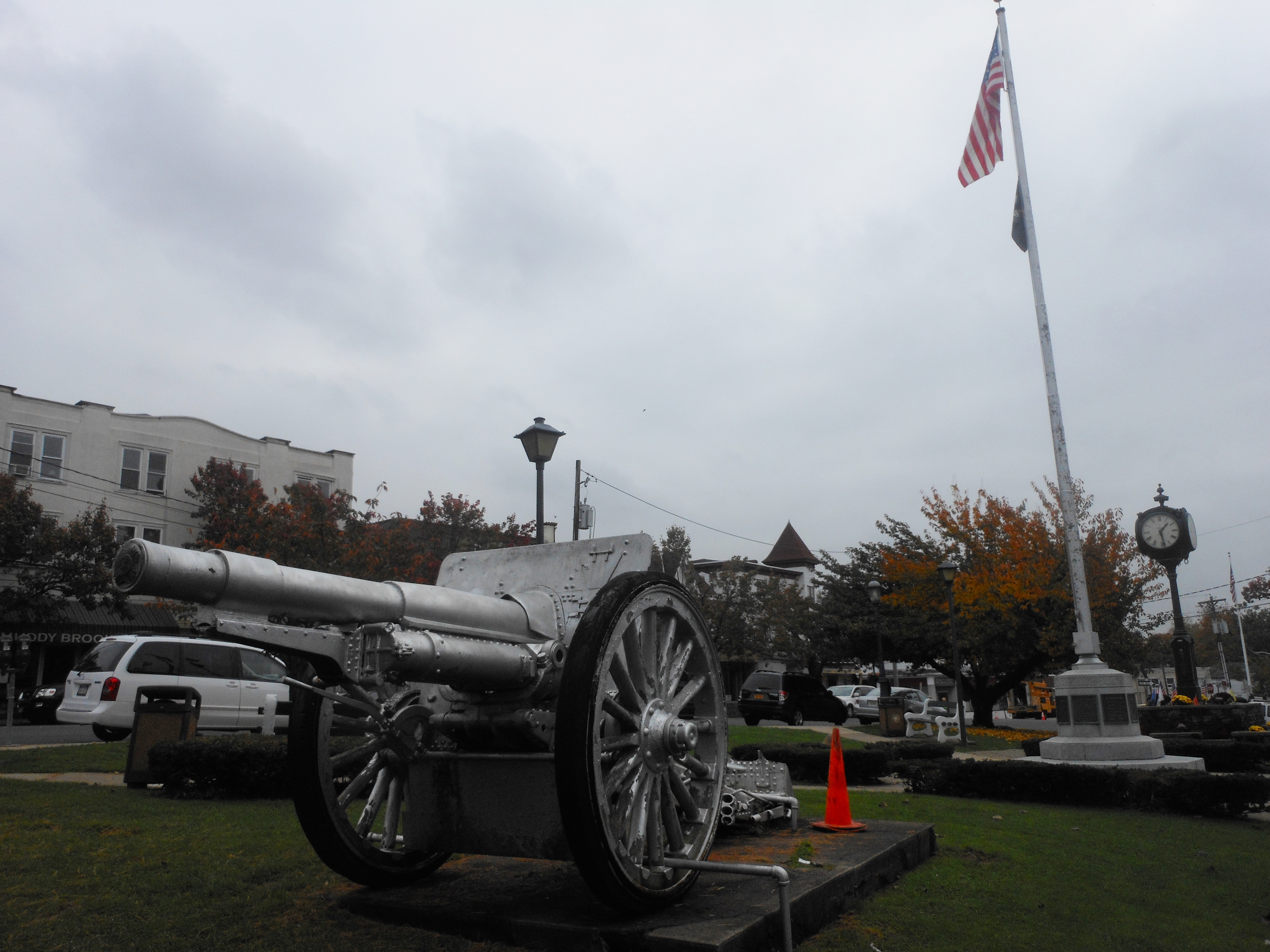
Braunsdorf Park in downtown Pearl River

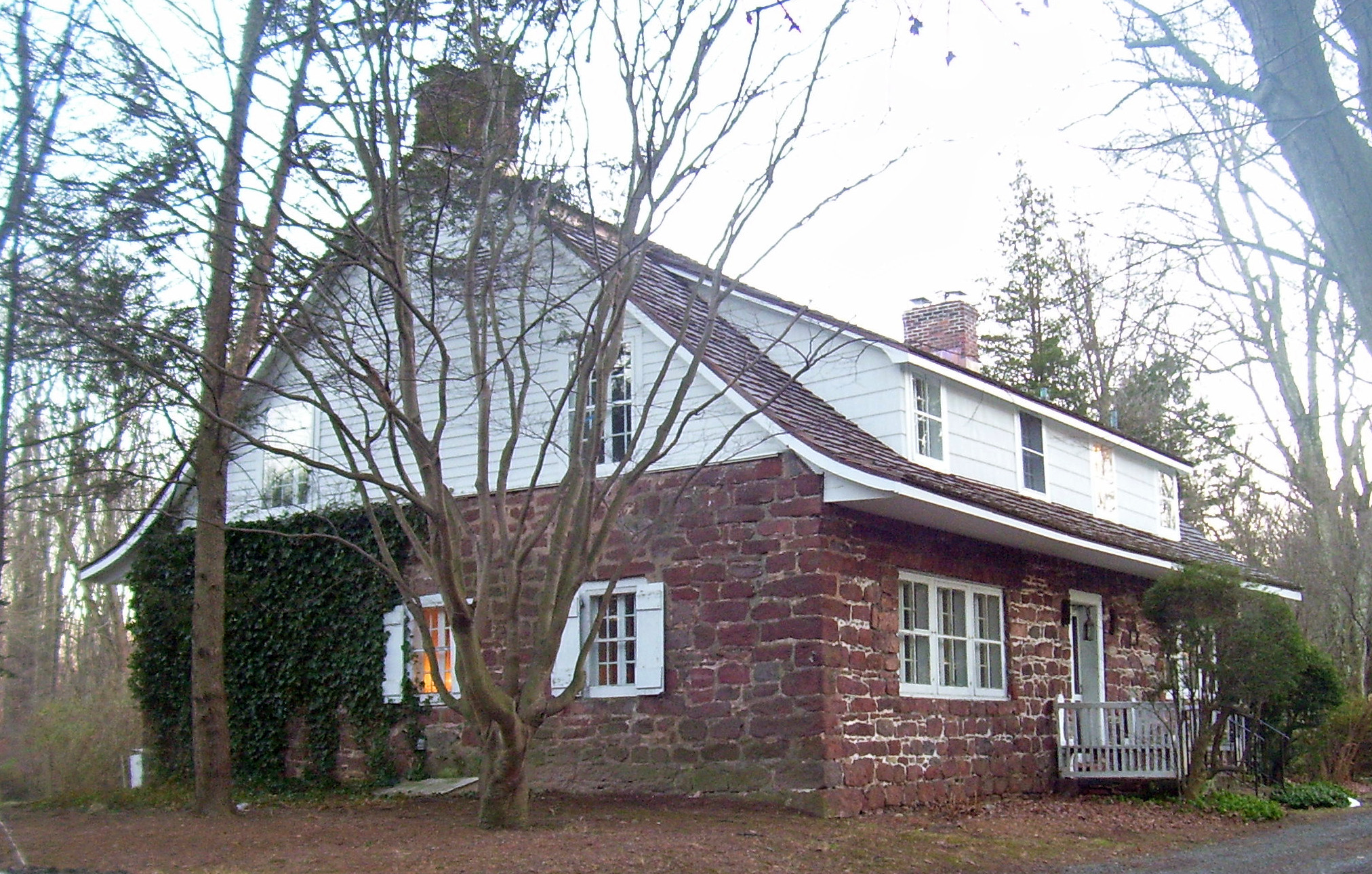
Jacob P. Perry House

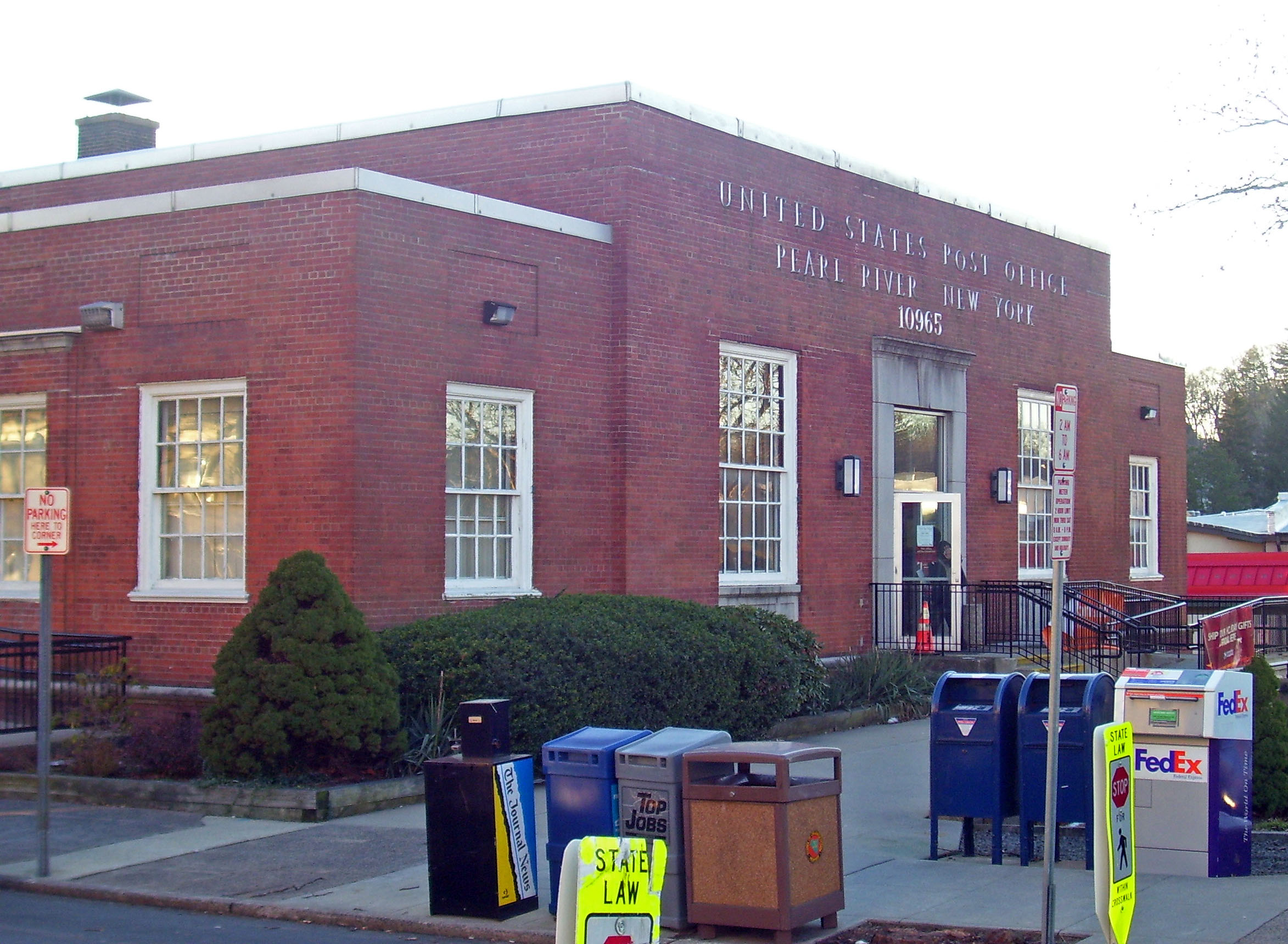
Pearl River Post Office

Sites listed on the National Register of Historic Places include:

- Jacob P. Perry House, constructed around the end of the 18th century.
- Edward Salyer House, a wood frame house built in the 1760s.
- United States Post Office, erected in the mid-1930s.

== Education ==
Public education is administered by the Pearl River Union Free School District. Schools include:

- Lincoln Avenue Elementary School
- Evans Park School
- Franklin Avenue School
- Pearl River High School
- Pearl River Middle School

=== Catholic school ===
- St. Margaret of Antioch School

== Notable people ==
- Lori Barbero, drummer and musician
- Christopher Carley, actor
- Robert Clohessy, actor
- Macduff Everton, photographer
- Mike Horn, musician (Seawind of Battery)
- John Flaherty, television baseball broadcaster and retired Major League Baseball player
- Dan Fortmann, professional football player and physician, member of Pro Football Hall of Fame
- Brian Gaine, American football executive who was the general manager of the Houston Texans from 2018 to 2019.
- Aline Griffith, socialite, spy, and writer
- Mary Beth Keane, writer
- Mike Lawler, Republican U.S. representative for New York's 17th congressional district
- Dan Masterson, poet
- Mario Perillo, Perillo Tours owner also known as Mr. Italy
- Josephine Pucci, ice hockey player and Olympic silver medalist
