= David Carlucci =

American politician

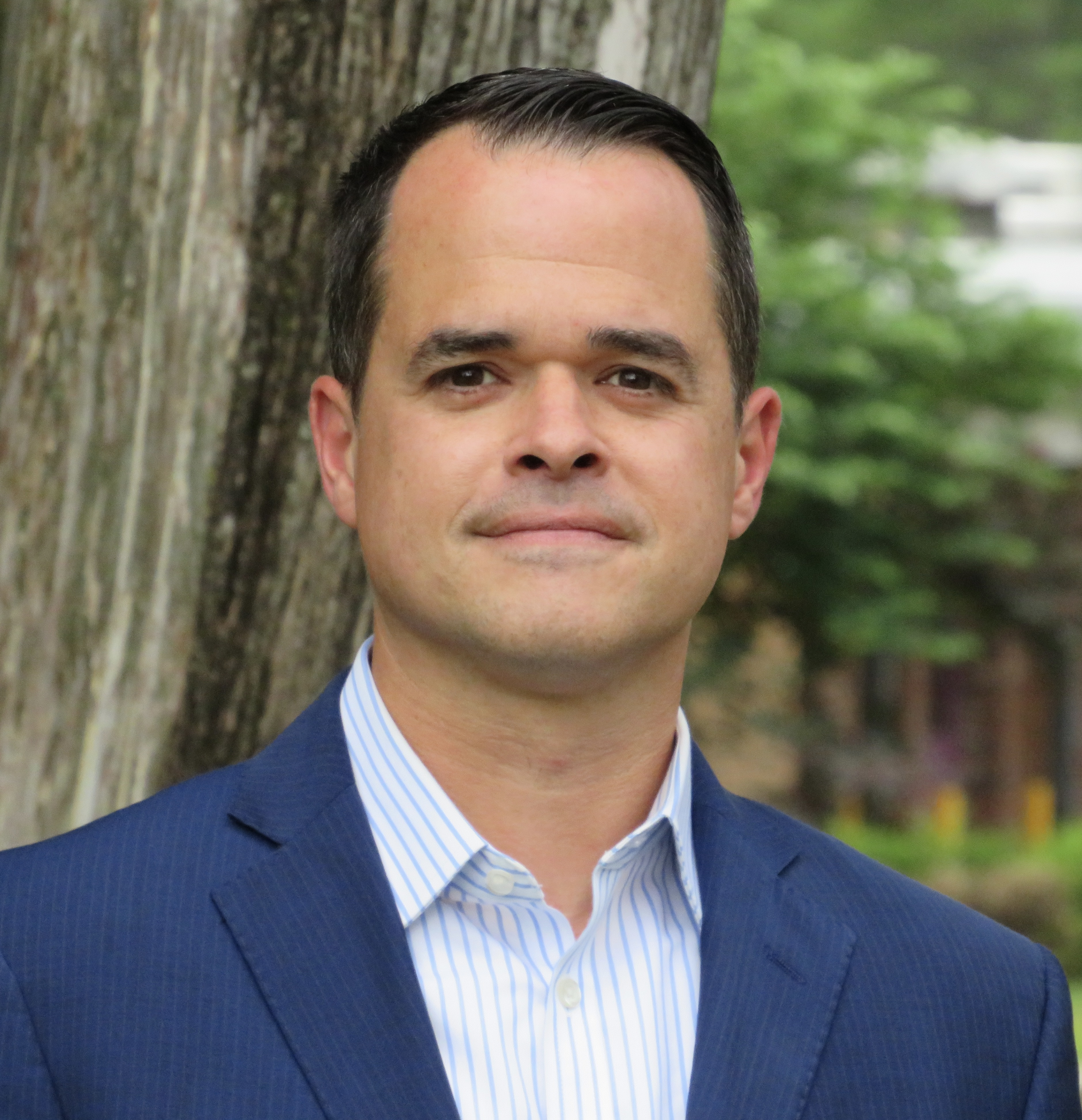

Member of the New York State Senate from the 38th district
- In office January 1, 2011 – December 31, 2020
- Preceded by: Thomas P. Morahan
- Succeeded by: Elijah Reichlin-Melnick

Personal details
- Born: April 3, 1981 (age 45) Clarkstown, New York, U.S.
- Party: Democratic
- Other political affiliations: Independent Democratic Conference (2011–2018)
- Spouse: Lauren Grossberg
- Children: 2
- Education: Rockland Community College; Cornell University (BS)
- Website: State Senate website

David S. Carlucci (/ˌkɑːrˈluːtʃi/ kar-LOO-chee; born April 3, 1981) is an American politician in Rockland County, New York. A member of the Democratic Party, he was the state senator for the 38th district, which includes most of Rockland County and parts of Westchester County until December 2020. Carlucci was one of the youngest senators elected to the New York State Senate in 2010 at just 29 years old.^{[3]} Carlucci served as the chair of the Committee on Mental Health and Developmental Disabilities.

In October 2019, Carlucci announced his bid for the United States House of Representatives for New York's 17th congressional district. to replace retiring Representative Nita Lowey. He lost to attorney Mondaire Jones of Rockland County in the Democratic Primary.

Since leaving the Senate, Carlucci has founded the government relations and public affairs firm Carlucci Consulting and become a frequent political commentator on networks including Fox News, BBC, NewsNation, and Newsmax.

== Early life and education ==
Carlucci was born in Clarkstown, New York, and raised in Rockland County. He attended Clarkstown High School North and ran track. He graduated from Rockland Community College in 2000. He went on to attend Cornell University and graduated with a Bachelor of Science degree in industrial and labor relations in 2002.

Carlucci has maintained a lasting connection to Rockland Community College since his graduation. He delivered the "Message to the Graduates" at the 2016 RCC Commencement ceremony, provided a special recorded address during the college's 2020 Virtual Commencement when in-person gatherings were suspended due to the COVID-19 pandemic, and returned to deliver the commencement address to the Class of 2026.

== Early career ==
Carlucci worked as a financial planner for American Express from 2002 to 2003 and worked in Congressman Eliot Engel's office as a staff assistant from 2004 to 2005.

In 2003, Carlucci made his first political run for the office of Town Clerk in the Town of Clarkstown. Carlucci lost to the 28-year incumbent, Republican Patricia Sheridan. In 2006, he defeated Sheridan by 294 votes at the age of 24.

== New York Senate ==
=== Domestic terrorism ===
Following the Monsey Hanukkah stabbing in December 2019 which came amid a state-wide and national increase in anti-Semitic crimes and incidents, Senator Carlucci collaborated with former Governor Andrew Cuomo to draft a bill to create a formal state statute against domestic terrorism. Together, they passed the "Josef Neumann Hate Crimes Domestic Terrorism Act of 2020" named after one of the victims of the stabbing. The bill was implemented into New York State law through the 2020 budget and exists as the first domestic terrorism law in the nation. The assailant of the 2022 Buffalo shooting, who shot and killed 10 Black people in a supermarket, was the first individual to be charged under the domestic terrorism statute.

=== Elections ===
In May 2010, Carlucci announced his candidacy for the Democratic nomination for New York State Senate in district 38. That same month incumbent, Republican Thomas P. Morahan announced he would not be seeking re-election. Morahan who was 78-years-old was seeking treatment for leukemia. In June 2010, Rockland republicans nominated then Rockland County Executive C. Scott Vanderhoef over Rockland County Legislator Ed Day, as the Republican nominee. Carlucci defeated Vanderhoef and won 53 percent of the vote, picking up a seat that had not been held by a Democrat since 1984. He was one of the youngest senators elected to the New York State Senate at just 29-years-old.

Carlucci went on to win four more general elections. He also defeated a primary challenger, Julie Goldberg, in 2018. All of his former IDC colleagues faced similar primary challenges and most were defeated.

=== Legislation ===
Carlucci has passed more than 160 bills that were signed into law since 2011. He supported the SAFE Act, raise the age of criminal responsibility, a $15/hr minimum wage plan, and paid family leave policy.

In 2014, Carlucci's bill to create a relapse prevention program to combat heroin addiction in New York State would be signed into law by Governor Cuomo. Carlucci secured funding for the Nyack Skate Park "Working with my colleagues in the Senate, we were able to secure a grant that will finally [let Nyack] complete this project," said Carlucci. "It makes it easier when it comes from the ground up [...] when the community really comes together and sees that vision."

Carlucci co-sponsored legislation to redesign the handicap logo after 45 years. Carlucci explained "New York is again leading the way by being the first state in the Nation to update our outdated 'handicap' signs with a more active, engaging symbol. Working together we will continue to be a shining example for disability rights throughout the country,"

In 2015, Carlucci proposed legislation to create the Mental Illness Anti-Stigma Fund which would later be signed into law by Governor Cuomo. The Mental Illness Anti-Stigma Fund will support critical programs to eliminate the stigma surrounding mental health issues and received funding from a tax check-off box which appeared on state income tax forms. Carlucci declared "The signing of this bill into law is the first step to eliminating the stigma of mental illness from our society, New Yorkers can now directly help end the stigma by making a donation that will fund mental health public awareness campaigns across the state."

Carlucci sponsored legislation making the heroin – overdose antidote Naloxone available over the counter. Carlucci stated In a letter to state Health Commissioner Howard Zucker, "As the number of overdoses increases, so should the amount of people who have access to naloxone [...] By issuing a standing order, you will make naloxone, which has not been shown to be a dangerous drug, more accessible, and in turn save more lives."

Carlucci proposed an arrangement where Marydell whose views overlooks the Hudson and is contiguous with 1,831 acres of state parkland would become public land. David stated "This is an excellent opportunity to expand Hook Mountain State Park,"

In 2016, Carlucci sponsored a bill to review the precautions at rail crossings after deadly accidents which would later be signed into law by Governor Cuomo. Carlucci illustrated in a statement "We need to seriously examine why the number of crossing accidents has increased in New York, and what we can do to fix them as soon as possible."

Carlucci called for renewed investment to restore the Vanderbilt-Budke House & adjacent Farmhouse on the Traphagen property in Clarkstown.

In 2017, Carlucci sponsored legislation banning tobacco discounts coupons in New York State. "Time and time again, we've seen that as prices go up for tobacco products, the usage declines," Carlucci said Monday. "[Coupons and discounts] are a way for big tobacco companies to get around the high prices of cigarettes."

Carlucci secured funding for Grace VanderWaal's show choir in the East Ramapo district elementary school. Carlucci stated "East Ramapo students are lucky to have Grace VanderWaal as a role model for them and helping make this new choir a reality,"

In 2019, Carlucci sponsored legislation requiring the State Office of Mental Health to regularly review suicide prevention programs and recommend changes to be meet the needs of at risk individuals and address risk factors for minority and underrepresented populations. Carlucci also sponsored legislation to establish a Black Youth Suicide Task Force to address an increasing rate of suicide among black children ages 5-years to 18-years-old. The task force would be made up of mental health professionals with knowledge of the black community who can examine, evaluate and determine remedies to tailor youth suicide prevention efforts in the back community.

Carlucci championed the Heatstroke Elimination Awareness Technology (HEAT) Act, which would require cars in the state to have detection systems installed. The intent was to force automakers to make the change on a national level similar to how California lawmakers have set nationwide emissions standards. Carlucci explained "Unless they're required to make these safety features, they don't do them [...] This is not some scientific theory. This is being done in other places."

Carlucci co-sponsored the Climate Leadership and Community Protection Act (CLCPA); the law aims to have New York's electricity entirely from emission-free sources by 2040 and reduce greenhouse gas emissions by 85% by 2050. Carlucci also sponsored the Green Amendment, a constitutional amendment to the New York State Constitution which guarantees "each person shall have the right to clean air and water, and a healthful environment."

Carlucci sponsored legislation allowing 16-year-olds to pre-register to vote. David Stated "When young people are engaged from any early age they stay engaged [...] By eliminating barriers to register and increasing education, we are strengthening our democracy."

Carlucci sponsored several pieces of key legislation which requires an independent, comprehensive, forensic audit of the MTA. An audit would show how, and where, the MTA gets and spends its money, ensure that drivers facing cashless-tolling fines would not have their credit scores adversely affected by late payment of bills. Drivers who live in Westchester and Rockland counties could see their toll reduced by 60% when crossing the Gov. Mario M. Cuomo Bridge. However drivers who intentionally skip out on paying a toll can be charged with a Class "A" misdemeanor, which can carry a maximum of one year in jail or three years of probation. Additionally, a judge may impose a fine up to $1,000 additionally drivers who previously incurred fees and fines on any MTA crossing could have the penalties waived, under a six-month amnesty program, similar to the one used by the Thruway Authority.

Carlucci sponsored legislation in 2019 banning employers from asking job applicants their salary history as a requirement for a job interview, job application, job offer, or promotion. Carlucci sponsored legislation signed into law, allowing survivors of domestic violence to report the incident of abuse to any law enforcement agency in New York State, regardless of where it happened.

In 2020, Carlucci's amended version of Dream's Law was signed by Governor Cuomo. The bill requires hospitals to have a discharge plan in place before a person can leave. Carlucci sponsored Lauren's Law, which requires individuals who apply for a driver's license to complete the organ donor registry section of the application by selecting either "yes" or "skip this question." Carlucci helped expand the Elderly Pharmaceutical Insurance Coverage (EPIC), which provides discount drugs for senior citizens.

Carlucci sponsored the Pension Poaching Prevention Act. The will crackdown on scammers trying to profit off a veteran's service by selling them financial products they don't need or charging them to apply for benefits they do not quality for. In 2013, Carlucci sponsored a bill that was signed into law called Jobs for Heroes, which gives a tax credit to businesses for hiring returning veterans.

Carlucci sponsored Legislation Banning Crib Bumper Pads. "As a parent, it's our job to protect our children, and I simply cannot imagine how the families are coping who have lost a newborn due to crib bumper pads," said Former Senator David Carlucci. "We know these accessories are not safe due to the risk of suffocation or strangulation of a baby and yet they are still marketed to parents as a matching nursery accessory. It's time we ban their sale in New York State and prevent further tragedies." In 2019 Senate Bill S3788A was signed into law by the NYS governor.

In 2020, Carlucci proposed legislation which would later be signed into law by Governor Cuomo. Before Carlucci's legislation New York State law required all front seat passengers to wear seat belts, while people under the age of 16 wear seat belts whether they're seated in the front or back seats. Carlucci's legislation requires everyone to wear seat belts in the backseat of a vehicle, no matter the age of the passenger. Carlucci stated while on the chamber floor "The simple fact is that you're not any safer in the back seat [...] So we have to make that message loud and clear by passing this legislation."

Carlucci sponsored legislation to rename a portion of Route 45 "The Sandra L. Wilson Memorial Highway"; "Sandra Wilson was attacked for no reason. She was at the library simply doing her job," Carlucci said Wednesday. "She was known to patrons for her warm smile and friendly demeanor. This roadway will serve as a reminder of her kindness and ensure her legacy is remembered in Spring Valley and the entire State of New York."

Carlucci sponsored legislation which made it illegal for employers to ask about applicants salary history. David stated "Now, New Yorkers can talk about their qualifications and not their past wages in an interview, For too long, the salary history question was used by some employers to justify low pay and low raises for women and women of color. We are now working to close the gender wage gap and ensure equal pay for equal work."

Carlucci championed legislation which shortened New York States suicide hotline to 988

During the Covid-19 Pandemic, Carlucci sponsored legislation which would be signed into law by Governor Cuomo which guarantees schools will not lose state funding due to COVID-19 closures. Carlucci explained "Our school districts need every penny as potential cuts could be devastating [...] Schools should not be penalized for making necessary decisions in the wake of the COVID-19 pandemic."

=== Independent Democratic Caucus (IDC) ===
On January 5, 2011, Carlucci entered into the Senate and formed the Independent Democratic Conference (IDC), with three other Democratic senators, Jeffrey D. Klein, Diane Savino, and David J. Valesky. The formation of the IDC created a third legislative conference in the State Senate. The senators said the IDC would "push for commonsense solutions to the problems facing New York State, break the hyper-partisan gridlock that has gripped the Senate and work to restore the public's trust in its public officials." In 2013, the IDC and the Senate Republicans announced a majority coalition agreement. Their Democratic colleagues called the move a power grab and liberal Democrats blamed the group for enabling a Republican agenda.

In April 2018, the IDC was dissolved and Carlucci joined the Senate Democratic Conference. In the 2018 Democratic Primary, Carlucci defeated challenger Julie Goldberg by a 54% to 46% margin, becoming one of only two former IDC members, along with Diane Savino, to defeat primary challengers.

== U.S. House of Representatives bid ==
In October 2019, Carlucci announced his bid for New York's 17th congressional district. Previously, Congresswoman Nita Lowey, who represents the district, had announced she would not be seeking another term and would be retiring after 30+ years in office. After Carlucci announced his run, he told the Journal News that he has "the experience, work ethic, energy to get the job done. For me, public service isn't just a job or career: it's my life." The focuses of his campaign include education, climate change, gun reforms, women's rights, and comprehensive immigration reform. He lost the primary to Mondaire Jones.

His campaign was endorsed by various organizations including Laborers local 754, IOUE local 825.

== Controversies ==
In June 2017, several members of the IDC, including Carlucci, sent a pro-choice mailer to their constituents that, according to Planned Parenthood, "misleads constituents by implying electoral support from Planned Parenthood." The mailer used the Planned Parenthood logo and read "Supported by Planned Parenthood" on the front. In a letter to the IDC, Planned Parenthood stated that they had not made any endorsements and misuse of their logo "undermines confidence and integrity in this endorsement process." The mailer also touted Carlucci's support of two major pieces of pro-choice legislation, the Reproductive Health Act and the Comprehensive Contraception Coverage Act, while referring to both bills by the wrong names. A spokesperson for the IDC said in a statement: "Constituents have a right to know where their senators stand on women's health issues and this is what the IDC communicated to voters. Every member of the IDC supports women's health rights and universally stand at the ready to pass these vital issues."

== Post-senate ==
After leaving the New York State Senate at the end of 2020, Carlucci turned his attention to the private sector and media, leveraging his decade of legislative experience into a new chapter.

=== Founding of Carlucci Consulting ===
In January 2021, Carlucci founded Carlucci Consulting, where he now serves as Founder & Managing Partner. His firm describes itself as a full-service public-affairs and government-relations entity that helps clients navigate legislative and regulatory landscapes in New York and beyond.

The foundation of the consulting firm marks Carlucci’s shift from elected office to advising private-sector, nonprofit and institutional clients on policy strategy, stakeholder engagement, and media relations.

=== Media and Commentary ===
Since his departure from the Senate, Carlucci has become a frequent television commentator, appearing on networks including Fox News, Fox Business, BBC, NewsNation and NewsMax. His firm’s website includes a “Media” page listing multiple appearances between 2021-25. For instance, in August 2023 he appeared on Fox Business for a segment on the 2024 presidential race. In August 2025 he provided commentary for Spectrum on the red-districting battle between New York and Texas.

During the 2024 presidential campaign, Carlucci was one of the most prominent Democratic strategists appearing on national television to discuss Vice President Kamala Harris’s campaign. Several of his segments were shared by the official Kamala Harris campaign account (@KamalaHQ) on X (formerly Twitter), including a Fox News appearance where he noted Harris’s record of labor endorsements.

Carlucci has occasionally gained attention for his strongly worded commentary on national-political issues that has led to visible reactions on air. Including his early morning appearance on “Fox & Friends” the morning after a major presidential debate (defending Joe Biden as one of the first Democratic guests).

=== Awards and recognition ===
In 2021, Carlucci was recognized on The City & State New York Mental Health Power 50 list. "Serving in the state Senate between 2011 and 2020, David Carlucci focused on mental health care and substance abuse policy, including as chair of the Mental Health and Developmental Disabilities Committee beginning in 2013 and as co-chair of a joint task force on opioid addiction and overdose prevention."

In 2026, Carlucci was named to City & State New York's Who's Who in Government Relations, which recognizes the state's top government relations professionals.

== Personal life ==
On January 15, 2011, Carlucci married his high school sweetheart and longtime girlfriend, Lauren Grossberg. Grossberg is a Rockland County native and an elementary school teacher. The pair met in high school on the track team. They have two children. They live in the town of Clarkstown, New York. He also has a niece named Ella Doremus, who is the same age as his eldest son.

In November 2025, Carlucci published President Next: A Historical Roadmap to Forecasting the Future President, a narrative survey of U.S. presidential nominating contests from 1960 to 2024, with Freiling Publishing.

== Election history ==
New York 38th senatorial district, 2010 general election
Party	Candidate	Votes	%
Democratic	David S. Carlucci	47,382	48.8
Working Families	David S. Carlucci	3,767	4.3
Total	David S. Carlucci	51,515	53.0
Republican	C. Scott Vanderhoef	37,826	38.9
Conservative	C. Scott Vanderhoef	5,851	6.0
Independence	C. Scott Vanderhoef	1,928	2.0
Total	C. Scott Vanderhoef	45,605	47.0
Total votes		97,120	100.0
Democratic gain from Republican			

New York 38th senatorial district, 2012 general election
Party	Candidate	Votes	%
Democratic	David S. Carlucci	68,524	64.1
Working Families	David S. Carlucci	4,087	3.8
Independence	David S. Carlucci	2,817	2.6
Total	David S. Carlucci (incumbent)	75,428	70.6
Republican	Janis A. Castaldi	31,460	29.4
Total votes		106,460	100.0
Democratic hold			

New York 38th senatorial district, 2014 general election
Party	Candidate	Votes	%
Democratic	David S. Carlucci	41,172	59.9
Working Families	David S. Carlucci	3,796	5.5
Independence	David S. Carlucci	2,291	3.7
Total	David S. Carlucci (incumbent)	68,691	69.2
Republican	Donna Held	21,171	30.8
Total votes		89,862	100.0
Democratic hold			

New York 38th senatorial district, 2016 general election
Party	Candidate	Votes	%
Democratic	David S. Carlucci	72,717	61.1
Independence	David S. Carlucci	3,286	2.8
Women's Equality	David S. Carlucci	1,314	1.1
Total	David S. Carlucci (incumbent)	77,317	65.0
Republican	Thomas F. DePrisco	32,792	27.6
Conservative	Thomas F. DePrisco	4,850	4.1
Reform	Thomas F. DePrisco	3,970	3.3
Total	Thomas F. DePrisco	41,612	35.0
Total votes		118,929	100.0
Democratic hold			

New York 38th senatorial district, 2018 primary election
Party	Candidate	Votes	%
Democratic	David S. Carlucci (incumbent)	13,066	53.9
Democratic	Julie M. Goldberg	11,174	46.1
Total votes		24,240	100.0

New York 38th senatorial district, 2018 general election
Party	Candidate	Votes	%
Democratic	David S. Carlucci	60,990	63.3
Women's Equality	David S. Carlucci	2,019	2.1
Total	David S. Carlucci (incumbent)	63,009	65.4
Republican	C. Scott Vanderhoef	26,265	27.3
Conservative	C. Scott Vanderhoef	4,242	4.4
Reform	C. Scott Vanderhoef	2,097	2.2
Independence	C. Scott Vanderhoef	723	0.8
Total	C. Scott Vanderhoef	33,327	34.6
Total votes		96,336	100.0
Democratic hold			

New York's 17th congressional district, 2020 Democratic primary
Party	Candidate	Votes	%
Democratic	Mondaire Jones	32,794	41.91%
Democratic	Adam Schleifer	12,732	16.27%
Democratic	Evelyn Farkas	12,210	15.60%
Democratic	David Carlucci	8,648	11.05%
Democratic	David Buchwald	6,673	8.53%
Democratic	Asha Castleberry-Hernandez	2,062	2.64%
Democratic	Allison Fine	1,588	2.03%
Democratic	Catherine Parker	1,539	1.97%
Total votes		78,246	100.0%

New York State Senate
Preceded by Thomas P. Morahan	38th Senate district 2011–2020	Succeeded by Elijah Reichlin-Melnick
