= Elijah Reichlin-Melnick =

American politician

- Reichlin-Melnick in 2021

Member of the New York State Senate from the 38th district
- In office January 1, 2021 – December 31, 2022
- Preceded by: David Carlucci
- Succeeded by: Bill Weber

Personal details
- Born: June 2, 1984 (age 42) Nyack, New York, U.S.
- Party: Democratic
- Education: Cornell University (BA); Rutgers University (MCRP)
- Website: Campaign website; Official website

Elijah Reichlin-Melnick (born June 2, 1984) is a former politician who served one-term as a member of the New York State Senate for the 38th district. He succeeded David Carlucci and was defeated by Bill Weber in 2022 and again in 2024.

== Early life and education ==
Reichlin-Melnick was born and raised in Nyack, New York. He attended Nyack High School and earned a Bachelor of Arts degree in history from Cornell University in 2006. He later earned a master's degree in city and regional planning, with a concentration in housing and real estate, from Rutgers University in 2015.

== Career ==
=== Early career ===
After receiving his bachelor's degree, he spent two years as an elementary school teacher at Dwight Elementary School in New Haven, Connecticut. He later served on the Nyack Village Planning Board and was elected vice president of the Rockland County Young Democrats and chairman of the Nyack Democratic Committee. He was an active member of the Nyack NAACP and the Nyack Tree Committee. After leaving Dwight Elementary School, Reichlin-Melnick began working as a constituent service specialist and district representative for Congressman Eliot Engel and Congresswoman Nita Lowey until 2013. After working in Congress, Reichlin-Melnick completed his master's degree, he worked as the executive assistant for Orangetown, New York Town Supervisor Andy Stewart. He later worked as the legislative director for New York State Senator James Skoufis.

=== Nyack Village Board ===
In April 2017, Reichlin-Melnick was appointed to the Nyack Village Board to fill a vacancy left by Doug Foster. On November 7, 2017, Reichlin-Melnick was elected to a two-year term on the Village Board and was subsequently re-elected on November 3, 2019.

=== New York State Senate ===
On December 17, 2019, Reichlin-Melnick announced his candidacy for district 38 in the New York State Senate. On June 23, 2020, Reichlin-Melnick defeated Clarkstown Town Clerk Justin Sweet and Spring Valley Trustee Eudson Francois in the Democratic primary election. On November 3, 2020, he defeated Republican nominee Bill Weber. In 2022, Reichlin-Melnick was defeated by Weber in a rematch. Reichlin-Melnick and Weber faced off for a third time in 2024, and on November 5, 2024, Weber again defeated Reichlin-Melnick by nearly triple the margin of his 2022 victory.

== Personal life ==
Reichlin-Melnick's brother, Aaron, is an immigration policy expert and senior fellow at the American Immigration Council.
