= Dan Masterson =

American poet (born 1934)

Dan E. Masterson (February 22, 1934 – August 12, 2022) was an American poet. He was born in Buffalo, New York.

== Biography ==
Dan Masterson was born in 1934 and was the youngest child of Stephen and Kathleen Masterson. He attended St. Paul's Parochial School in Buffalo, New York and graduated from Kenmore High School in 1952.

Masterson graduated from Syracuse University in 1956 with a degree from the S. I. Newhouse School of Public Communications. After college, he was a disc jockey at the Buffalo radio station WBNY. He hosted a jazz show named Mystic Midnight from midnight to 3 a.m. until he began his service in the United States Army Signal Corps. Following his service in the Signal Corps, he worked as a promoter for traveling Broadway plays and musicals. He and his wife Janet moved to Rockland County, where he became a substitute high school teacher and then a full-time teacher before joining the English faculty at Rockland Community College in the mid-1960s.

== Literary career ==
Dan Masterson's first book of poetry, On Earth as It Is, was published in 1978 by The University of Illinois Press. In 1986, Masterson was elected to membership in PEN International. His volumes of verse include On Earth as It Is and Those Who Trespass, published in 1985. He served as a manuscript judge for The Associated Writing Programs' national manuscript competition and as a contributing editor to the annual Pushcart Prize Anthology. He received two writing fellowships from the State University of New York and was the first Writer-in-Residence at The Chautauqua Writers Center. In 2006, Syracuse University's Bird Library acquired "The Dan Masterson Papers" for its Special Collections Research Center. From 2009 to 2013, Masterson served as Rockland County's poet laureate.

== Teaching ==
A recipient of the SUNY Chancellor's Award for Excellence in Teaching, Masterson began teaching at Rockland Community College (RCC) in the mid-1960s. He taught there for 53 years. For eighteen years, he also served as an adjunct full professor at Manhattanville College in Westchester County, directing the poetry and screenwriting programs. Upon his retirement from Manhattanville College, the college's Board of Trustees established The Dan Masterson Prize in Screenwriting in his honor.

== Family ==
Masterson was married to Janet, and they had two children.

== Works ==
=== Poetry collections ===
- *On Earth as It Is - University of Illinois Press, 1978
- *Those who Trespass - University of Arkansas Press, 1985
- *World Without End - University of Arkansas Press, 1991
- *All Things, Seen and Unseen - University of Arkansas Press, 1997
- *Here We Are - Circumstantial Productions, 2014

== Awards ==
- *Poetry Northwest Bullis Prize
- *The Borestone Mountain Poetry Award
- *Pushcart Prize, 1978
- *Pushcart Prize, 1988
- *The CCLM Fels Award
- *Rockland County (NY) Poet Laureate, 2009-2011
- *Rockland County (NY) Poet Laureate, 2011-2013
