= Bill Weber (New York politician) =

American politician

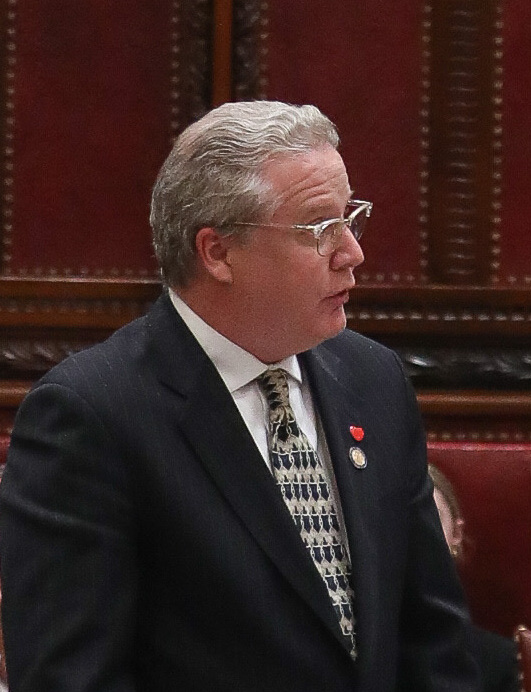

Member of the New York State Senate from the 38th district
- Incumbent
- Assumed office January 1, 2023
- Preceded by: Elijah Reichlin-Melnick

Personal details
- Born: October 1, 1969 (age 57)
- Party: Republican
- Education: Pace University (BA)
- Website: Official website Campaign website

William J. Weber Jr. (born October 1, 1959) is an American politician serving as a member of the New York State Senate from the 38th District since 2023. Weber, a Republican, defeated incumbent Democrat Elijah Reichlin-Melnick in the 2022 election, and beat Reichlin-Melnick again in 2024, by nearly triple the margin of his 2022 victory.

Weber graduated from Pace University in 1991 with a degree in public accountancy. Prior to his election to the Senate, Weber was the chief financial officer of a family-run business.
