= New York's 38th State Senate district =

American legislative district

Senator
[Bill Weber (New York politician)|William Weber Jr.]] –Nyack
- Registration: 40% Democratic; 36% Republican; 23.5% No party preference
- Demographics: 64% White; 12% Black; 16% Hispanic; 6% Asian
- Population (2017): 310,286
- Registered voters: 192,534

New York's 38th State Senate district is one of 63 districts in the New York State Senate. It is currently represented by Republican Bill Weber since 2023. It was previously represented Democrat Elijah Reichlin-Melnick since 2021, succeeding fellow Democrat and former IDC member David Carlucci, who waged an unsuccessful run for Congress.

== Geography ==
District 38 covers the vast majority of Rockland County in the northern New York City suburbs, including the towns of Orangetown, Clarkstown, and Ramapo; the district also crosses the Hudson River to incorporate a small part of Ossining in Westchester County.

The district is located entirely within New York's 17th congressional district, and overlaps with the 95th, 96th, 97th, and 98th districts of the New York State Assembly.

== Recent election results ==
=== 2026 ===
2026 New York State Senate election, District 38
Primary election
Party	Candidate	Votes	%
Working Families	Joseph Rand	218	61.2
Write-in		138	38.8
Total votes		356	100.0
General election
Republican	William Weber Jr.		
Conservative	William Weber Jr.		
Total	William Weber Jr. (incumbent)		
Democratic	Joseph Rand		
Working Families	Joseph Rand		
Total	Joseph Rand		
Write-in			
Total votes			

=== 2024 ===
2024 New York State Senate election, District 38
Primary election
Party	Candidate	Votes	%
Working Families	Barbara Francis	205	58.6
Working Families	Elijah Reichlin-Melnick	143	40.9
Write-in		2	0.5
Total votes		350	100.0
General election
Republican	William Weber Jr.	63,428	
Conservative	William Weber Jr.	5,850	
Total	William Weber Jr. (incumbent)	69,278	52.4
Democratic	Elijah Reichlin-Melnick	59,750	45.2
Working Families	Barbara Francis	3,099	2.3
Write-in		159	0.1
Total votes		132,286	100.0
Republican hold			

=== 2022 ===
2022 New York State Senate election, District 38
Party	Candidate	Votes	%
Republican	William Weber Jr.	42,612	
Conservative	William Weber Jr.	8,473	
Total	William Weber Jr.	51,085	51.6
Democratic	Elijah Reichlin-Melnick	45,264	
Working Families	Elijah Reichlin-Melnick	2,608	
Total	Elijah Reichlin-Melnick (incumbent)	47,872	48.3
Write-in		115	0.1
Total votes		99,072	100.0
Republican gain from Democratic			

=== 2020 ===
2020 New York State Senate election, District 38
Primary election
Party	Candidate	Votes	%
Democratic	Elijah Reichlin-Melnick	12,542	44.9
Democratic	Justin Sweet	10,042	36.7
Democratic	Eudson Francois	4,902	17.6
Write-in		440	1.6
Total votes		27,926	100.0
Republican	William Weber Jr.	4,617	69.8
Republican	Matthew Weinberg	1,884	28.5
Write-in		111	1.7
Total votes		6,612	100.0
General election
Democratic	Elijah Reichlin-Melnick	65,707	
Working Families	Elijah Reichlin-Melnick	5,102	
Total	Elijah Reichlin-Melnick	70,809	53.7
Republican	William Weber Jr.	59,654	
SAM	William Weber Jr.	1,301	
Total	William Weber Jr.	60,955	46.2
Write-in		129	0.1
Total votes		131,893	100.0
Democratic hold			

=== 2018 ===
2018 New York State Senate election, District 38
Primary election
Party	Candidate	Votes	%
Democratic	David Carlucci (incumbent)	13,066	53.9
Democratic	Julie Goldberg	11,174	46.1
Write-in		0	0.0
Total votes		24,240	100.0
General election
Democratic	David Carlucci	60,990	
Women's Equality	David Carlucci	2,019	
Total	David Carlucci (incumbent)	63,009	65.4
Republican	C. Scott Vanderhoef	26,265	
Conservative	C. Scott Vanderhoef	4,242	
Reform	C. Scott Vanderhoef	2,097	
Independence	C. Scott Vanderhoef	723	
Total	C. Scott Vanderhoef	33,327	34.5
Write-in		125	0.1
Total votes		96,461	100.0
Democratic hold			

=== 2016 ===
2016 New York State Senate election, District 38
Party	Candidate	Votes	%
Democratic	David Carlucci	72,717	
Independence	David Carlucci	3,286	
Women's Equality	David Carlucci	1,314	
Total	David Carlucci (incumbent)	77,317	65.0
Republican	Thomas DePrisco	32,792	
Conservative	Thomas DePrisco	4,850	
Reform	Thomas DePrisco	3,970	
Total	Thomas DePrisco	41,612	34.9
Write-in		93	0.1
Total votes		119,022	100.0
Democratic hold			

=== 2014 ===
2014 New York State Senate election, District 38
Party	Candidate	Votes	%
Democratic	David Carlucci	41,172	
Working Families	David Carlucci	3,796	
Independence	David Carlucci	2,552	
Total	David Carlucci (incumbent)	47,520	69.1
Republican	Donna Held	21,171	30.8
Write-in		108	0.1
Total votes		68,799	100.0
Democratic hold			

=== 2012 ===
2012 New York State Senate election, District 38
Party	Candidate	Votes	%
Democratic	David Carlucci	68,524	
Working Families	David Carlucci	4,087	
Independence	David Carlucci	2,817	
Total	David Carlucci (incumbent)	75,428	70.4
Republican	Janis Castaldi	31,460	29.3
Write-in		368	0.3
Total votes		107,256	100.0
Democratic hold			

=== Federal results in District 38 ===
Year	Office	Results
2020	President	Biden 52.4 – 46.5%
2016	President	Clinton 54.1 – 43.2%
2012	President	Obama 53.8 – 45.2%
2012	Senate	Gillibrand 67.1 – 31.8%
