= List of Washington's Headquarters during the Revolutionary War =

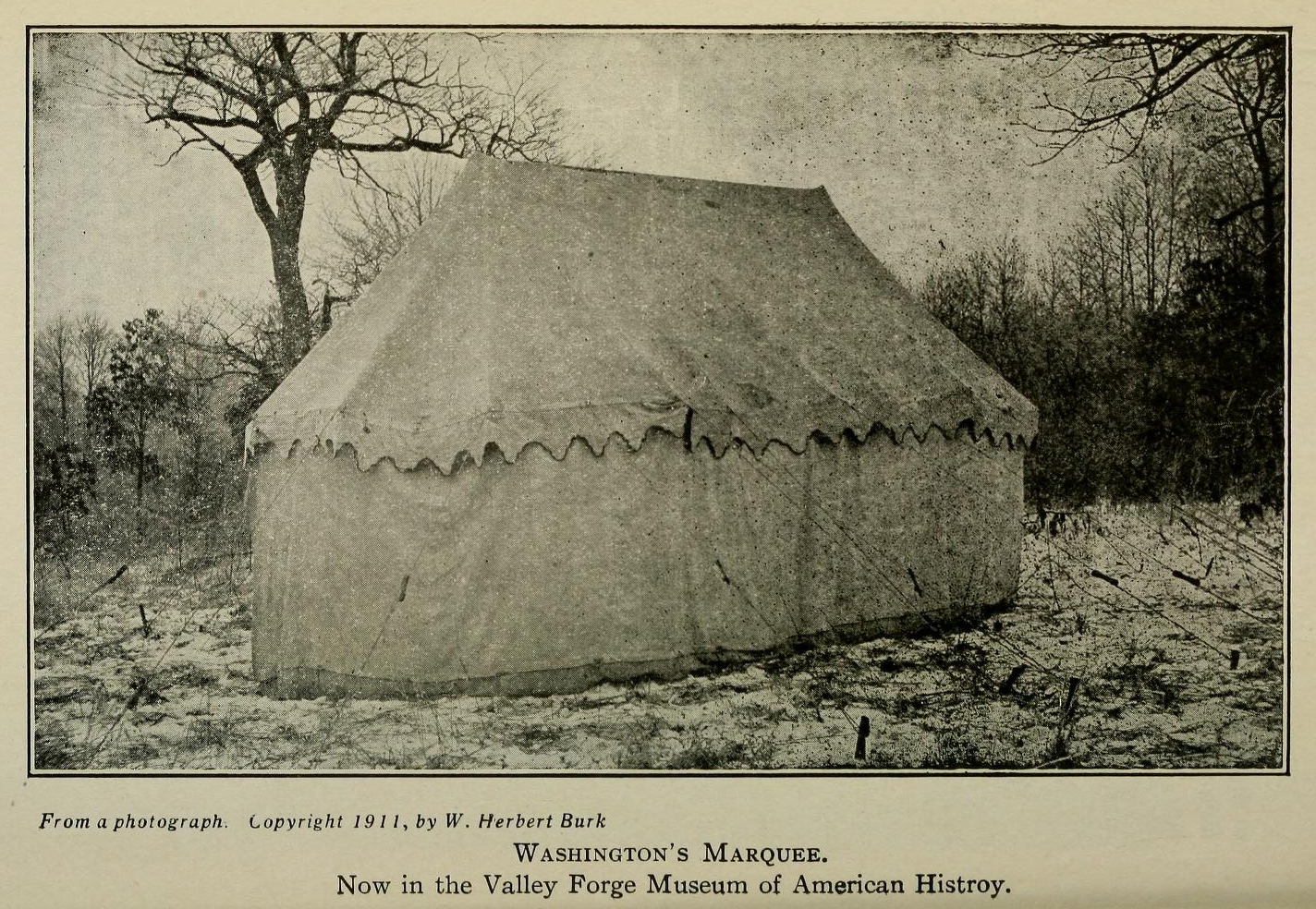
George Washington's second office/sleeping tent was made in Reading, Pennsylvania, and arrived at Valley Forge in June 1778, near the end of the winter encampment. It is now exhibited at the Museum of the American Revolution in Philadelphia.

The following is a list of buildings or locations that served as headquarters for General George Washington during the American Revolutionary War.

== Background ==
On April 19, 1775, the militia of Massachusetts, later joined by the militias of other New England colonies, began a siege at Boston to prevent thousands of newly-arrived British troops from moving inland.

On June 14, 1775, the Second Continental Congress, meeting in Philadelphia, created a Continental Army to be formed out of the individual militias of the Thirteen Colonies. The next day, Congress created the position of Commander-in-Chief of the Continental Army, and unanimously elected Washington to that position. Congress formally presented him with his commission on June 19, and he departed Philadelphia on June 23, headed for Cambridge, Massachusetts. He arrived in Cambridge on July 2, and took command. The siege lasted almost 11 months, until March 17, 1776, when the British withdrew by ship.

Washington's headquarters staff consisted of a military secretary, initially Colonel Joseph Reed, and four aides-de-camp, initially William Palfrey, Stephen Moylan, Richard Cary, and Robert Hanson Harrison. They managed Washington's correspondence, made copies of each day's general orders to be distributed to the commanding officer at each military post, and made copies of individual orders from the commander-in-chief.

Traveling with the headquarters staff and a troop of bodyguards, Washington tended to stay at military camps, taverns, houses belonging to Continental Army officers or sympathetic civilians, and vacant houses seized from Loyalists. Topography and geographical features were exploited to protect a headquarters. For example: before and after the Battle of Germantown, Washington stayed at the Henry Keely House, atop a plateau on the west side of the Perkiomen Creek, while the Continental Army camped on the east side of the creek at Pennypacker Mills; positioned between the British Army and Washington.

Washington's correspondence and expense accounts are useful sources for determining his location on a specific date. For instance: an expense account entry that lists meals – but not "use of house" – likely indicates that Washington and his staff pitched their tents on the owner's property.

== Headquarters ==
| Name | Image | Location/GPS Coordinates | Dates | Notes |
|---|---|---|---|---|
| Benjamin Wadsworth House | | Harvard Yard, 1341 Massachusetts Avenue, Cambridge, Massachusetts; 42.373234°N 71.1182814°W | July 2 to 15, 1775 | First of Washington's Headquarters. July 3 – Washington takes command of the Continental Army. |
| John Vassall House, also known as Longfellow House –Washington's Headquarters National Historic Site | | 105 Brattle Street, Cambridge, Massachusetts; 42.376667°N 71.126389°W | July 15, 1775 to April 4, 1776 | March 17, 1776 – Siege of Boston ends with the British evacuation of nearly 10,000 troops. |
| Samuel Dexter House | | 699 High Street, Dedham, Massachusetts; 42.25015°N 71.17792°W | April 4 to 5, 1776 | "Expenses paid ... Dexters – £9.18.7." |
| Governor Stephen Hopkins House | | 15 Hopkins Street, Providence, Rhode Island; 41.821667°N 71.403333°W | April 5 to 7, 1776 | |
| | | | April 7 to 8, 1776 | |
| Leffingwell Inn; Christopher Leffingwell, proprietor | | 348 Washington Street, Norwich, Connecticut; 41.542222°N 72.088056°W | April 8 to 9, 1776 | Jedidiah Huntington House |
| Nathaniel Shaw Mansion | | 11 Blinman Street, New London, Connecticut; 41.351122°N 72.098098°W | April 9 to 10, 1776 | |
| John McCurdy House | | 2 McCurdy Road, Old Lyme, Connecticut; 41.3127°N 72.3311°W | April 10 to 11, 1776 | |
| Sun Tavern; Samuel Penfield, proprietor | | Town Hall Green, Fairfield, Connecticut; 41.141900°N 73.249244°W | April 11 to 12, 1776 | "Expenses paid ... Penfield's at Fairfield – £2.0.9."; Destroyed by fire in 1779. Rebuilt on the same site. |
| Guion's Tavern | | Boston Post Road, near East 233rd Street, Eastchester, Bronx, New York | April 12 to 13, 1776 | "Expenses paid ... Guion's – £2.11.8."; Demolished in 1895. |
| William Smith House | | Pearl Street, opposite Cedar Street, Manhattan, New York City, New York; 40.70636°N 74.00709°W | April 13 to 17, 1776 | Demolished. |
| "Richmond Hill" (Abraham Mortier House) | | Varick & Vandam Streets, Manhattan, New York City, New York; 40.726833°N 74.005278°W | April 17 to May 21, 1776 | Demolished in 1849. |
| Tavern at New Ark | | Newark, New Jersey | May 21 to 22, 1776 | "Tavern at New Ark 12 Dollrs" |
| Hudibras Tavern; Colonel Jacob Hyer, proprietor | | SW corner of Nassau Street & Washington Road, Princeton, New Jersey; 40.350229°N 74.657199°W | May 22 to 23, 1776 | Demolished. |
| | | Philadelphia, Pennsylvania | May 23 to June 5, 1776 | |
| White Hall Tavern; Myndert Van Voorhees, proprietor | | Albany Street, east of Neilson Street, New Brunswick, New Jersey; 40.497286°N 74.441139°W | June 5 to 6, 1776 | "Expenses paid ... Minne Voorhies. Brunswic – 16 Dollrs" |
| Returns to "Richmond Hill" (Abraham Mortier House) | | Varick & Vandam Streets, Manhattan, New York City, New York; 40.726833°N 74.005278°W | June 6 to August 27, 1776 | Samuel Fraunces, who provided meals here for Washington and his staff, later claimed to have thwarted an assassination attempt against Washington. Demolished in 1849. |
| Brooklyn Heights | | Atlantic Avenue, btw. Clinton & Court Streets, Brooklyn, New York City, New York; 40.689668°N 73.993763°W | August 27 to 30, 1776 | August 27 – Battle of Long Island; August 29–30 – Retreat to Manhattan |
| | | Manhattan, New York City, New York | August 30 to September 13, 1776 | |
| Archibald Kennedy House | | NE corner Broadway & Battery Place, Manhattan, New York City, New York; 40.7048°N 74.0142°W | | Later headquarters for British General Howe. |
| Robert Murray House | | 36th Street & 4th Avenue, Manhattan, New York City, New York | September 13 to 14, 1776 | |
| Mott's Tavern | | 143rd Street & 8th Avenue; Manhattan, New York City, New York (now Hamilton Heights, Manhattan) | September 14 to 15, 1776 | |
| Roger Morris House, also known as Morris-Jumel Mansion | | Jumel Terrace & West 160th Street, Manhattan, New York City, New York; 40.834473°N 73.938583°W | September 15 to October 21, 1776 | September 16 – Battle of Harlem Heights. |
| Valentine's Mile Square | | Valentine's Hill, Yonkers, New York; 40.931141°N 73.864349°W | October 21 to 22, 1776 | October 22 – "Expenses at Valentine's Mile Square – 20 Dollrs"; Now the site of St. Joseph's Seminary. |
| Jacob Purdy House | | 60 Park Avenue, White Plains, New York; 41.036667°N 73.773889°W | October 22 to 28, 1776 | October 28 – Battle of White Plains |
| Elijah Miller House | | Virginia Road, North White Plains, New York; 41.059167°N 73.770833°W | October 28 to November 10, 1776; Summer 1778; Summer 1781 | |
| Van Cortlandt Upper Manor House, also known as "Upper Manor" (Pierre Van Cortlandt House) | | 110 Oregon Road, Cortlandt Manor, New York; 41.312222°N 73.906111°W | November 10 to 12, 1776 | Greatly altered. Now part of Cortlandt Healthcare Nursing Care Center. |
| General Green's quarters Stephen Bourdette House | | near Burdett's Landing, Fort Lee, New Jersey; 40.8436°N 73.9667°W | November 12 to 15, 1776 | November 12 – Washington crosses to the west side of the Hudson River at Fort Lee. Demolished in 1899. |
| | | Hackensack, New Jersey | November 15, 1776 | Washington is on his way south when he receives news of a British threat against Fort Washington (east side of the Hudson River). He returns to Fort Lee. |
| Returns to General Green's quarters Stephen Bourdette House | | near Burdett's Landing, Fort Lee, New Jersey; 40.8436°N 73.9667°W | November 15 to 18, 1776 | November 16 – Battle of Fort Washington. From Fort Lee, on west side of the Hudson River, Washington can see the British attack, but cannot risk sending reinforcements on a daylight crossing. He abandons plans for a night crossing when boats of retreating soldiers begin arriving. |
| Peter Zabriskie Mansion | | 50 Main Street, Hackensack, New Jersey; 40.879608°N 74.043789°W | November 18 to 21, 1776 | Invasion of British troops and beginning of Great Retreat from Fort Lee; Home of Col. Peter Zabriskie of General Washington's army. Later Judge and Signer of Ratification for the U.S. Constitution for Bergen Co.. . Demolished in 1945. |
| Tap House Tavern; James Leslie, proprietor | | River Road, Acquackanonk Township now Passaic, New Jersey; 40.855222°N 74.121035°W | November 21 to 22, 1776 | Battle of Acquackanonk Bridge, November 22, 1776; To James Leslie, tavern keeper, dr. "two bottles of toddy for the soldiers at work on the bridge, six shillings. Received payment." Later renamed Blanchard House. Destroyed by fire in 1877. |
| Eagle Tavern | | Broad Street at William Street; Newark, New Jersey; 40.734167°N 74.172542°W | November 22 to 28, 1776 | Major Samuel Sayres, proprietor. Washington himself was lodged a home of Reverend Alexander McWhorter |
| Returns to White Hall Tavern; Myndert Van Voorhees, proprietor | | Albany Street, east of Neilson Street, New Brunswick, New Jersey; 40.497286°N 74.441139°W | November 28 to December 1, 1776 | aka Cochrane's Tavern |
| | | Kingston, New Jersey | December 1 to 2, 1776 | |
| | | Princeton, New Jersey | December 2 to 3, 1776 | |
| | | Trenton, New Jersey | December 3 to 8, 1776 | December 8 – The Army crosses to the west side of the Delaware River at Trenton. |
| "Summerseat" (Thomas Barclay House) | | Clymer Street & Morris Avenue, Morrisville, Pennsylvania; 40.2080879°N 74.7795874°W | December 8 to 14, 1776 | |
| William Keith House | | Pineville Road, Upper Makefield Township, Pennsylvania; 40.295556°N 74.946944°W | December 14 to 24, 1776 | Destroyed by fire in the 1980s |
| Thompson-Neely House | | River Road, Solebury Township, Pennsylvania; 40.330972°N 74.937722°W | December 25, 1776 | |
| | | | | December 25 – Washington's Crossing of the Delaware. December 26 – Battle of Trenton. |
| John Harris House | | Sycamore Street & Swamp Road, Newtown, Pennsylvania; 40.2289869°N 74.9388018°W | December 26 to 30, 1776 | Demolished in 1863. A gas station now occupies the site. |
| John Barnes House | | Greene Street, Trenton, New Jersey | December 30, 1776 to January 1, 1777 | Demolished. |
| True American Inn; Jonathan Richmond, proprietor | | Broad Street, south of the bridge, Trenton, New Jersey; 40.2177°N 74.7637°W | January 1 to 2, 1777 | Destroyed by fire in 1843. |
| Alexander Douglass House | | 478 Centre Street, Trenton, New Jersey; 40.205865°N 74.758111°W | January 2 to 3, 1777 | January 2 – Battle of the Assunpink Creek; The house was relocated three times from its original location at 191 S. Broad Street, to 478 Centre Street in 1876, to Stacy Park in 1926, and to Mill Hill Park in 1972. |
| | | Princeton, New Jersey | | January 3 – Battle of Princeton. |
| John Van Doren House | | 1488 Main Street, Millstone, New Jersey; 40.4961°N 74.5879°W | January 3 to 4, 1777 | Along march to winter encampment at Morristown |
| John Fenner House | | U.S. Route 206, Pluckemin, New Jersey; 40.64556°N 74.63944°W | January 4 to 6, 1777 | Demolished in 1940. |
| Arnold's Tavern; Jacob Arnold, proprietor | | 20 North Park Place, Morristown Green, Morristown, New Jersey; 40.7973796°N 74.4815604°W | January 6 to May 29, 1777 | Destroyed by fire in 1918. |
| First Middlebrook encampment | | Middlebrook, New Jersey | May 29 to June 24, 1777 | "The Army is now drawn together at this place, at least that part of it, which have been Cantoned all Winter in this state. The whole of them now Encamped in Comfortable Tents on a Valley covered in front and rear by ridges which affords us security. His excellency our good Old General, has also spread his Tent, and lives amongst us." |
| Nathaniel Drake House | | 602 West Front Street, Quibbletown (now Plainfield), New Jersey; 40.613611°N 74.432222°W | June 24 to 26, 1777 | June 26 – Battle of Short Hills. |
| First Middlebrook encampment | | Middlebrook, New Jersey | June 26 to July 3, 1777 | |
| Liberty Corner Tavern; Bullion, proprietor | | Liberty Corner, New Jersey; 40.664897°N 74.577818°W | July 3, 1777 | July 3 – Expenses paid at Bullion's Tavern – £3. |
| | | Morristown, New Jersey | July 4 to 10, 1777 | Brief layover by the army |
| | | | July 11, 1777 | July 11 – Expenses paid to Mr. Hathaway – £5.12.6. |
| Colonel William Colfax House | | 2343 Paterson-Hamburg Turnpike, Pompton (now Wayne), New Jersey; 40.9875°N 74.279722°W | July 11 to 14, 1777 | July 14 – Expenses paid to Mrs. Van Twiller – £5.12.11. |
| Hendrick Van Allen House | | Ramapo Valley Road & Franklin Avenue, Oakland, New Jersey; 41.029722°N 74.236389°W | July 14 to 15, 1777 | July 14 – "Vanaulens 8 Miles from Pumpton Plains ... I arrived here this Afternoon with the Army after a very fatiguing March" |
| Suffern's Tavern; John Suffern, proprietor | | Washington & Lafayette Avenues, The Clove (now Suffern), New York; 41.11511°N 74.14935°W | July 15 to 20, 1777 | July 15 – "I have just arrived with the Army at this place where I shall remain till I see what turn Genl Howe takes." Demolished. |
| Galloway's Tavern; George Galloway, proprietor | | Old Clove Road (now NY State Route 17), Southfields, New York; 41.244792°N 74.176026°W | July 20 to 23, 1777 | July 22 – Expenses paid to "Mr. Galloway for house Room &c. – £4.5." |
| | | Ramapo, New York | July 23 to 25, 1777 | July 25 – "cash paid at Ramapaugh for house room &c. – £2.5." |
| Abraham Lott House | | South Beverwyck Road; Troy Hills, New Jersey | July 25, 1777 | "Mr Lott's, 8 Miles East of Morris Town"; Demolished. |
| Mandeville Inn | | 493 Newark-Pompton Turnpike, Pequannock Township, New Jersey; 40.961051°N 74.29448°W | July 26 to 28, 1777 | July 26 – Expenses paid "at Mandevils for house room &c. – £2.5."; Demolished 1941, current site of Pequannock Valley Middle School |
| Colonel John Mehelm House | | New Bromley Road, Readington, New Jersey; 40.6379163°N 74.7579738°W | July 28 to 29, 1777 | "4 Miles East of Flemingtown"; The nearby White House Tavern held a store of food for the army. July 29 – Expenses paid to Mrs. Lowry – £1.2.6. Destroyed by fire in the 1960s. |
| Holcombe House | | 260 North Main Street (NJ State Route 29), Coryell's Ferry (now Lambertville), New Jersey; 40.375278°N 74.945556°W | July 29 to 31, 1777 | British General Howe and 15,000 troops sail from New York City at the end of July. Washington moves his Army to Lambertville to be able to counter, north or south, depending on Howe's destination. Howe sails into the Chesapeake Bay, lands at Head of Elk, and begins a march toward Philadelphia. Holcombe is paid £5.10 for 22 suppers and 22 breakfasts. |
| City Tavern; Daniel Smith, proprietor | | 138 South 2nd Street, Philadelphia, Pennsylvania; 39.947°N 75.145°W | July 31 to August 1, 1777 | |
| | | Chester, Pennsylvania | August 1 to 2, 1777 | |
| Returns to City Tavern; Daniel Smith, proprietor | | 138 South 2nd Street, Philadelphia, Pennsylvania; 39.947°N 75.145°W | August 2 to 4, 1777 | August 2 – Washington first meets the Marquis de Lafayette. Expenses paid to Mr. Smith – £263.4. |
| Colonel Henry Hill House | | Indian Queen Lane, Roxborough, Philadelphia, Pennsylvania | August 4 to 8, 1777 | Expenses paid to Col. Hill's servants – £0.17.6. Demolished in 1780. |
| Encampment | | near Germantown, Philadelphia, Pennsylvania | August 8 to 10, 1777 | August 10 – Washington and staff dine at the Crooked Billet Tavern in Hatboro, en route to the Moland House. |
| John Moland House | | "The Cross Roads," Old York Road, Warwick Township, Pennsylvania; 40.236111°N 75.092778°W | August 10 to 23, 1777 | August 20 – Washington first meets Count Casimir Pulaski of Poland, who volunteers to join the American cavalry. August 23 – Expenses paid to Mrs. Moland – £5.5.0. |
| Stenton | | 4601 North 18th Street, Philadelphia, Pennsylvania; 40.023778°N 75.154611°W | August 23 to 24, 1777 | |
| Rudolph's Tavern | | Chester Pike & Springfield Road, Darby Township, Pennsylvania; 39.91821°N 75.263013°W | August 24 to 25, 1777 | August 24 – "Expenses paid Mr Rudulph at Derby for his Excellency & family – $16." |
| George Forsythe House (Quaker Hill) | | West Street, btw. 3rd & 4th Streets, Wilmington, Delaware; 39.741357°N 75.55472°W | August 25 to 26, 1777 | Demolished. |
| "The Hermitage" (Robert Alexander House) | | Gray's Hill, Hermitage Drive, near Elkton, Maryland; 39.61197°N 75.82105°W | August 26 to 27, 1777 | The day after Washington's departure, British General Howe makes the Alexander House his headquarters. |
| Returns to George Forsythe House (Quaker Hill) | | West Street, btw. 3rd & 4th Streets, Wilmington, Delaware; 39.741357°N 75.55472°W | August 27 to September 6, 1777 | August 27 – Expenses paid to George Forsyth – £63.12.0. September 3 – Battle of Cooch's Bridge. Demolished. |
| | | Christiana Hundred, Newport, Delaware | September 6 to 9, 1777 | Expenses "paid at Christiana for family's breakfast, horses &c. – £6.5."; Expenses "paid on the road from thence to Wilmington for lodging &c. – £6." |
| Hale-Byrnes House | | Delaware Route 7 & Delaware Route 4, Stanton, Delaware; 39.701111°N 75.650556°W | September 6, 1777 | "The General officers are to meet at 5 O'clock this afternoon at the brick house by White-Clay creek, and fix upon proper picquets for the security of the camp." |
| | | Wilmington, Delaware | September 9, 1777 | Expenses "paid for breakfast the morning we crossed brandywine – £1.12." |
| Benjamin Ring House | | Brandywine Battlefield, Chadds Ford, Pennsylvania; 39.874278°N 75.579611°W | September 9 to 11, 1777 | September 9 – Council of War. |
| | | | | September 11 – Battle of Brandywine. |
| John McIlvane House | | Leiperville (now Woodlyn), Pennsylvania | September 11 to 12, 1777 | |
| | | Darby, Pennsylvania | September 12 to 13, 1777 | |
| Returns to Henry Hill House | | Indian Queen Lane; Roxborough, Philadelphia, Pennsylvania | September 13 to 14, 1777 | |
| Buck Tavern; Mary Miller, proprietor | | Lancaster Pike & Old Buck Road, Haverford, Pennsylvania; 40.01703°N 75.30966°W | September 14 to 15, 1777 | September 14 – The Army crosses to the west side of the Schuylkill River at Conshohocken. Demolished circa 1965. A car dealership now occupies the site. |
| Joseph (Randall?) Malin House | | Conestoga & Swedesford Roads, Malvern, Pennsylvania; 40.0471888°N 75.5387792°W | September 15 to 16, 1777 | September 16 – Battle of the Clouds |
| Yellow Springs Tavern | | Yellow Springs & Art School Roads, Yellow Springs, Pennsylvania; 40.1004589°N 75.6230205°W | September 16 to 17, 1777 | Demolished by 1824. Rebuilt on the same site. |
| Reading Furnace | | Reading Furnace and Mansion Roads, Warwick Township; 40.146944°N 75.768889°W | September 18, 1777 | General Washington retreats to Warwick to have the army's muskets repaired by Captain Samuel Van Leer. Reading Furnace built 1736. Nearby Warwick Furnace built 1737. |
| Parker's Ford Tavern | | 1806 Old Schuylkill Road, Parker Ford, Pennsylvania; 40.198445°N 75.580744°W | September 19, 1777 | September 19 – The Army crosses to the east side of the Schuylkill River at Parker's Ford. This was followed by a night march to Fatland Ford and Swede's Ford. |
| Fatland (James Vaux House) | | Pawlings Road, Lower Providence Township, Pennsylvania; 40.1191254°N 75.4431288°W | September 19 to 20, 1777 | September 19 – Expenses paid at "Flat Land ford" for "Breakfasts &c. – £2.5.0."; Demolished 1843. Rebuilt on the same site. |
| Derrick Casselberry House | | 275 Evansburg Road, Evansburg, Pennsylvania; 40.18254°N 75.4277884°W | September 20 to 21, 1777 | after midnight September 21 – Paoli Massacre |
| Thompson's (Thomson's) Tavern; Archibald Thomson, proprietor | | Ridge Pike (Reading Road) & Egypt Road, West Norriton Township, Pennsylvania | evening of September 21, 1777 | Night march to Pottsgrove |
| "Pottsgrove" (John Potts Mansion) | | High Street (Reading Road), Pottsgrove, Pennsylvania; 40.247778°N 75.659722°W | September 21 to 23, 1777 | With his army encamped at Valley Forge, British General Howe begins moving troops north to trick Washington into thinking that his goal is to capture the American military stores at Reading. When Washington moves his army north to defend Reading, Howe moves his army south, and captures Philadelphia. |
| Mr. Kennedy's House | | Ridge Pike (Reading Road), northwest of Trappe, Pennsylvania | September 22 to 23, 1777 | "Camp 28 miles from Philad^{a} on the Reading Road"; September 22 – "Expenses paid at Mr Kenedys for Sundries & trouble of the house – £3.10." |
| Colonel Frederick Antes House | | Colonial Road, Upper Frederick Township, Pennsylvania; 40.292222°N 75.540556°W | September 23 to 26, 1777 | "Camp on Schuylkill 34 Miles from Philadelphia"; September 23 – Expenses paid at Mr Antes – £10.12.6. |
| Henry Keely House (west side of the Perkiomen Creek) | | North Limerick Road, southwest of Schwenksville, Pennsylvania; 40.2491412°N 75.4680425°W | September 26 to 29, 1777 | The Army camps on the east side of the Perkiomen Creek, at Pennypacker Mills. September 26 – Philadelphia is captured by the British, who occupy the city until June 18, 1778. September 29 – Expenses paid "at Paulins mill for Sundries used in the house—& extra trouble – £5.10.0."; Demolished in 1834. |
| Jacob Smith House | | Hedrick Road, Skippack, Pennsylvania; 40.223286°N 75.381828°W | September 29 to October 2, 1777 | October 2 – Expenses paid at Mr. Smiths – £14.4.6. Demolished in the 1970s. |
| Peter Wentz Homestead | | Skippack Pike & Shearer Road, Worcester Township, Pennsylvania; 40.198889°N 75.333889°W | October 2 to 4, 1777 | October 4 – Expenses paid to Mathias Wentz – £2.10.6. |
| | | | October 4, 1777 | Battle of Germantown |
| Returns to Henry Keely House (west side of the Perkiomen Creek) | | North Limerick Road, southwest of Schwenksville, Pennsylvania; 40.2491412°N 75.4680425°W | October 4 to 8, 1777 | The Army camps on the east side of the Perkiomen Creek, at Pennypacker Mills. October 8 – Expenses paid "at Picaomin for necessaries used in the house–bread; potatoes–Milk–fouls–&c. & trouble" – £5. Demolished in 1834. |
| Frederick Wampole (Friedrick Wamboldt) House | | Detwiler Road, Towamencin Township, Pennsylvania; 40.259841°N 75.3498511°W | October 9 to 16, 1777 | October 15 – Expenses paid "Mr Wambol – £28.5.4."; Demolished in 1881. |
| Returns to Peter Wentz Homestead | | Skippack Pike & Shearer Road, Worcester Township, Pennsylvania; 40.198889°N 75.333889°W | October 16 to 20, 1777 | October 19 – Expenses paid to Mathias Wentz – £8.15.11. |
| "Dawesfield" (James Morris House) | | 565 Lewis Lane, Whitpain Township, Pennsylvania; 40.153333°N 75.248056°W | October 20 to November 2, 1777 | |
| George Emlen House | | 1901 Pennsylvania Avenue, Upper Dublin Township, Pennsylvania; 40.124736°N 75.189591°W | November 2 to December 11, 1777 | December 5–8 – Battle of White Marsh |
| Swede's Ford | | West Conshohocken, Pennsylvania | December 11, 1777 | December 11 – Battle of Matson's Ford "Matzon's Gué" (Swedes Ford) is shown at far upper left, in this map of the May 20, 1778 Battle of Barren Hill. |
| Isaac Hughes House | Isaac Hughes House "Ballygomingo", Washington's Headquarters Dec. 1777 | Gulph Mills, Pennsylvania | December 13 to 19, 1777 | December 18 – "[T]his is Thanksgiving Day thro the whole Continent of America—but god knows We have very Little to keep it with this being the third Day we have been without flouer or bread—& are Living on a high uncultivated hill, in huts & tents Laying on the Cold Ground, upon the whole I think all we have to be thankful for is that we are alive & not in the Grave with many of our friends—we had for thanksgiving breakfast some Exceeding Poor beef which has been boil.d & Now warm.d in an old short handled frying Pan in which we ware Obliged to Eat it haveing No other Platter—" |
| Isaac Potts House (occupied by Deborah Potts Hewes) | | PA State Route 23 & Valley Creek Road, Valley Forge, Pennsylvania; 40.101389°N 75.461944°W | December 19, 1777 to June 19, 1778 | June 19 – Expenses paid to Mrs. Hewes – £100. |
| "Doctor Shennons" (Dr. Robert Shannon House) | | Germantown Pike & Whitehall Road, East Norriton Township, Pennsylvania; 40.150453°N 75.347692°W | June 19 to 20, 1778 | June 20 – Expenses paid to Dr. Shannon – £10.17.6. Now part of Norristown Farm Park. |
| Jonathan Fell House | | East State Street, Doylestown, Pennsylvania; 40.313004°N 75.118760°W | June 20 to 21, 1778 | June 20 – Expenses "paid Jno Fell for Breakfast dinner & sup. for the General & suite – £6." |
| Returns to Holcombe House | | 260 North Main Street (NJ State Route 29), Coryell's Ferry (now Lambertville), New Jersey; 40.375278°N 74.945556°W | June 21 to 23, 1778 | June 21 – Washington crosses to the New Jersey side of the Delaware River, but most of the Army camps on the west side (New Hope, Pennsylvania), and crosses the following day. June 22 – Expenses paid to Mr. Holcombe – £10.17.6. |
| Joseph Stout House (Hunt House) | | Province Line Road; Hopewell Township, New Jersey; 40.409252°N 74.745735°W | June 23 to 25, 1778 | June 24 – Council of War. June 25 – Expenses paid Mr Hunt "for Sundries" – £10.2.6. |
| Captain Thomas Wetherill House | | Georges Road, near Kingston, New Jersey; 40.367416°N 74.507607°W | June 25 to 26, 1778 | Expenses paid "To Thos Wetheral the morning after we left Kingston – £14." |
| Dr. Hezekiah Stites House | | 53 South Main Street, Cranbury, New Jersey; 40.3052624°N 74.5191278°W | June 26 to 27, 1778 | Expenses paid to Dr. Stites – $9. Demolished. |
| Encampment | | Penelopen (now Manalapan), New Jersey | June 27 to 28, 1778 | |
| Monmouth County Courthouse | | "The Burlington Path", Freehold Borough, New Jersey; 40°15′37″N 74°16′30″W | June 28, 1778 | June 28 – Battle of Monmouth |
| Moses Laird House | | Main Street & Hamilton Road, Englishtown, New Jersey; 40.2964131°N 74.3583716°W, | June 29 to 30, 1778 | |
| Village Inn | | Main & Water Streets, Englishtown, New Jersey; 40.2970877°N 74.3587112°W | June 30, 1778 | Court-martial of General Charles Lee begins. |
| Ross Hall | | River Road and Ross Hall Boulevard; Piscataway, New Jersey; 40.510833°N 74.448611°W | July 1 to 7, 1778 | Demolished in 1957; July 2 – Court-martial of General Charles Lee continues. |
| | | Scotch Plains, New Jersey | July 7 to 8, 1778 | |
| | | | July 8 to 9, 1778 | |
| Colonel Thomas Cadmus House | | Ashland Avenue & Washington Street, Bloomfield, New Jersey; 40.7926351°N 74.2046507°W | July 9 to 10, 1778 | Demolished circa 1915. Rebuilt on the same site. |
| Great Falls (Passaic River) | | Paterson, New Jersey | July 10, 1778 | Washington, Hamilton, Lafayette & aide-de-camp James McHenry visit Great Falls. |
| "The Hermitage" (Theodosia Prevost House) | | 335 North Franklin Turnpike, Ho-Ho-Kus, New Jersey; 41.00703°N 74.116629°W | July 10 to 15, 1778 | July 14 – Expenses paid to Mrs. Prevost's servants – £4.10. July 15 – Expenses paid to Jacob Hardin – £3.8. |
| Colonel Ann Hawkes Hay House | | Haverstraw (now West Haverstraw), New York; 41.211389°N 73.988056°W | July 15 to 18, 1778 | Army crossing to east side of Hudson River at King's Ferry. July 16 – Washington inspects fortifications at West Point. Col. Hay is living in the house of his brother-in-law William Smith. Burned c. 1808–1809. |
| Captain Samuel Delavan House | | Hallock's Mill Road; Yorktown, New York | July 18 to 19, 1778 | July 18 – Expenses paid to Mr. Delavan – £10. Demolished. |
| Colonel Joseph Drake House | | Pelham Road & Drake Avenue, New Rochelle, New York; 40.8945371°N 73.7840913°W | July 19 to 20, 1778 | July 19 – "Drakes Farm" |
| Wright's Mills | | Mount Kisco Road, Valhalla, New York; 41.0888°N 73.7509°W | July 20 to 27, 1778 | July 25 – Council of War. July 28 – Expenses paid to Reuben Wright – £30.18.10. Demolished. |
| Returns to Jacob Purdy House | | 60 Park Avenue, White Plains, New York; 41.036667°N 73.773889°W | July 27 to September 16, 1778 | |
| Raymond House | | Bedford, New York | September 16 to 18, 1778 | |
| Colonel Stephen Moore House, also known as "The Red House" or "Moore's Folly" | | Target Hill, United States Military Academy, West Point, New York; 41.402678°N 73.967565°W | September 18 to 19, 1778 | Demolished, possibly as early as 1812. Now the site of Target Hill Athletic Fields. Image: The Moore House is in the upper left corner of the fort. |
| Mandeville's Tavern; Jacob Mandeville, proprietor | | Lower Station Road, Garrison, New York; 41.376667°N 73.945000°W | September 19 to 20, 1778 | September 19 – Expenses paid to Jacob Mandeville – £9.12.0. |
| "Faris's" (Reed Ferris House) | | Old Quaker Hill Road, south of Brady Brook, Pawling, New York; 41.55138°N 73.54874°W | September 20 to 26, 1778 | September 25 – Expenses paid to "Reed Ferriss" for "House Rent" and "Lodging" – £20.1.0. Demolished. Image: The Ferris property appears on the map, below center. |
| John Kane House | | East Main Street, Fredericksburg (now Pawling), New York; 41.556111°N 73.594167°W | September 26 to 30, 1778 | |
| John Brinckerhoff House | | Fishkill, New York | September 30 to October 8, 1778 | October 8 – "I shall this afternoon return to my old Quarters at Mr Kanes Fredericsburg–" |
| Returns to John Kane House | | East Main Street, Fredericksburg (now Pawling), New York; 41.556111°N 73.594167°W | October 8 to November 10, 1778 | |
| | | Poughkeepsie, New York | November 10, 1778 | |
| Returns to John Kane House | | East Main Street, Fredericksburg (now Pawling), New York; 41.556111°N 73.594167°W | November 11 to 28, 1778 | November 28 – Expenses "paid John Kane for use of his house, &c." – £57.12.0. |
| | | Philipsburg Manor farmland (now Hartsdale), New York | November 28 to 29, 1778 | |
| "Mr Lents" - Thomas Storm House, also known as Storm-Adriance-Brinckerhoff House | | Fishkill, New York; 41.596389°N 73.761111°W | November 29 to December 1, 1778. | December 1 – The Army crosses to the west side of the Hudson River at King's Ferry. |
| Returns to Colonel Ann Hawkes Hay House | | Haverstraw (now West Haverstraw), New York; 41.211389°N 73.988056°W | December 1 to 2, 1778 | Burned c. 1808–1809. |
| "Mr. Jones Baggat" | | Ramapo, New York | December 2 to 3, 1778 | |
| "Mr Goods" | | Pequannock, New Jersey | December 3 to 4, 1778 | |
| Returns to Abraham Lott House | | South Beverwyck Road; Troy Hills, New Jersey | December 4 to 5, 1778 | Demolished. |
| | | Morristown, New Jersey | December 5 to 6, 1778 | |
| | | Paramus, New Jersey | December 5 to 8, 1778 | |
| | | Elizabeth, New Jersey | December 8 to 11, 1778 | |
| John Wallace House | | 71 Somerset Street, Middlebrook (now Somerville), New Jersey; 40.568889°N 74.621944°W | December 11 to 21, 1778 | Second Middlebrook encampment |
| | | | December 21 to 22, 1778 | |
| Henry Laurens House | | North side of Chestnut Street, between 4th & 5th Streets, Philadelphia, Pennsylvania | December 22, 1778 to February 2, 1779 | Congress summons Washington to Philadelphia, where he spends 6 weeks as the guest of President of Congress Henry Laurens. Martha Washington joins him in the city, and accompanies him back to Middlebrook. Demolished in the mid-19th century. Image: The Henry Laurens House is in the background, left. |
| | | | February 2 | |
| | | | February 3 | |
| | | | February 4 | |
| Returns to John Wallace House | | 71 Somerset Street, Middlebrook (now Somerville), New Jersey; 40.568889°N 74.621944°W | February 5 to June 4, 1779 | June 4 – "Received of Major Gibbs one thousand dollars for the use of my house Furniture &c. &c. which His Excellency General Washington had for his Head quarters – John Wallace." |
| | | Pompton, New Jersey | June 4 to 5, 1779 | |
| Robert Erskine House | | Sloatsburg Road, Ringwood Manor State Park, Ringwood, New Jersey; 41.144444°N 74.252778°W | June 5 to 6, 1779 | Demolished by 1810. Rebuilt on the same site. |
| Sloat House | | NY State Route 17 & Sterling Avenue, Sloatsburg, New York; 41.151687°N 74.193889°W | June 6 to 7, 1779 | |
| Francis Smith's Tavern | | Smith's Clove (now Woodbury), New York | June 7 to 14, 1779 | |
| Returns to Colonel Stephen Moore House | | Target Hill, United States Military Academy, West Point, New York; 41.402678°N 73.967565°W | June 15 to 19, 1779 | June 18 – Washington visits Fishkill, New York; Demolished, possibly as early as 1812. Now the site of Target Hill Athletic Fields. Image: The Moore House is in the upper left corner of the fort. |
| Returns to Smith's Clove | | | June 19 to 21, 1779 | June 19 – Expenses paid to Francis Smith for 22 dinners – £15.4.0. |
| Colonel Thomas Ellison House | | River Road, New Windsor, New York; 41.472976°N 74.015286°W | June 24 to July 21, 1779 | Demolished. |
| Returns to Colonel Stephen Moore House | | Target Hill, United States Military Academy, West Point, New York; 41.402678°N 73.967565°W | July 21 to 25, 1779 | Demolished, possibly as early as 1812. Now the site of Target Hill Athletic Fields. Image: The Moore House is in the upper left corner of the fort. |
| Returns to Mandeville's Tavern; Jacob Mandeville, proprietor | | Lower Station Road, Garrison, New York; 41.376667°N 73.945000°W | July 25 to 26, 1779 | Expenses "to cash paid at Mandevils for house–rooms &c. – £2.5.0." |
| Returns to Colonel Stephen Moore House | | Target Hill, United States Military Academy, West Point, New York; 41.402678°N 73.967565°W | July 26 to November 28, 1779 | Demolished, possibly as early as 1812. Now the site of Target Hill Athletic Fields. Image: The Moore House is in the upper left corner of the fort. |
| Returns to Van Cortlandt Upper Manor House | | 110 Oregon Road, Cortlandt Manor, New York; 41.312222°N 73.906111°W | November 28 to 30 1779 | |
| Jacob Ford Mansion | | 30 Washington Place, Morristown, New Jersey; 40.797795°N 74.465203°W | December 1, 1779 to June 7, 1780 | "December 31st. Lady Washington arrived at Head Quarters at Morristown." |
| Briant's Tavern; Jacob Briant, proprietor | | Broad Street & New Jersey Route 24, Springfield Township, Union County, New Jersey; 40.7177958°N 74.3321648°W | June 7 to 22, 1780 | June 7 – Battle of Connecticut Farms; June 22 – Expenses paid to Jacob Briant – $800. Demolished. |
| Rockaway Bridge | | Rockaway Township, New Jersey | June 23, 1780 | June 23 – Battle of Springfield |
| Henry Doremus House | | Main Road & Heritage Court, Whippany (now Montville), New Jersey; 40.918358°N 74.354192°W | June 24 to 27, 1780 | June 25 – Expenses paid to Uzal Coe – $180; June 25 – Expenses paid to Mrs. Doremus – $40. |
| Isaac Vanderbeck House | | Preakness, New Jersey | June 27 to 29, 1780 | Expenses paid to Isaac Vanderbeck – $452. |
| Mr. Hopper | | Ramapo (now Mahwah), New Jersey | June 29 to July 1, 1780 | Expenses paid to Mr. Hopper – $200. |
| | | Passaic, New Jersey | | |
| Colonel Theunis Dey Mansion | | 199 Totowa Road, Wayne, New Jersey; 40.915556°N 74.233333°W | July 1 to 29, 1780 | July 29 – Expenses paid to Col. Dey's servants – $50. |
| Beverley Robinson House (headquarters of General Benedict Arnold) | | Garrison, New York (opposite West Point); 41.36493333°N 73.94975°W | July 30 to 31, 1780 | Destroyed by fire in 1892. |
| Daniel Birdsall House | | 979 Main Street, Peekskill, New York; 41.2914958°N 73.9202865°W | July 31 to August 6, 1780 | Demolished. A restaurant opposite the site is named "Birdsall House." |
| | | Verplanck's Point, New York; 41.249167°N 73.962222°W | August 6 to 7, 1780 | The Army crosses to the west side of the Hudson River. |
| Talman House | | Clarkstown, New York | August 7 to 8, 1780 | August 8 – Expenses paid to Mrs. Talman – $80. |
| DeWint House "near Orangetown" | | 20 Livingston Avenue, Tappan, New York; 41.019722°N 73.946667°W | August 8 to 24, 1780 | |
| Encampment near Liberty Pole Tavern; Tunis Cooper, proprietor | | NE corner of Palisade Avenue & Tenafly Road, Teaneck and Englewood, New Jersey; 40.89718°N 73.97969°W | August 24 to September 4, 1780 | "Head Quarters near the Liberty Pole."; Demolished circa 1880. |
| Zabriskie House | | Old New Bridge Road, Steenrapie (now River Edge), New Jersey; 40.913611°N 74.030833°W | September 4 to 17, 1780 | The house was confiscated from Loyalist Jan Zabriskie. |
| Hopper House | | Peekskill, New York | September 17 to 18, 1780 | |
| | | | September 18 to 19, 1780 | |
| Samuel Keeler's Tavern | | Ridgebury Road & George Washington Highway, Ridgefield, Connecticut; 41.360850°N 73.524717°W | September 19 to 20, 1780 | September 20 – In Washington's absence, the Army marches from Steenrapie to Orangetown, New York. |
| Jeremiah Wadsworth House | | 600 Main Street, Hartford, Connecticut; 41.763333°N 72.673889°W | September 20 to 23, 1780 | September 20–22 – Conference at Hartford. Washington meets with French General Rochambeau and French Admiral De Ternay. Demolished in 1887. Wadsworth Atheneum now occupies the site. |
| Oliver Wolcott House | | South Street, Litchfield, Connecticut; 41.743333°N 73.187778°W | September 23 to 24, 1780 | |
| | | Peekskill, New York | September 24 to 25, 1780 | |
| Returns to Beverley Robinson House | | Garrison, New York (opposite West Point); 41.36493333°N 73.94975°W | September 25 to 28, 1780 | September 25 – Washington arrives at the Robinson House an hour after Benedict Arnold flees to the British warship HMS Vulture. Destroyed by fire in 1892. |
| Returns to DeWint House | | 20 Livingston Avenue, Tappan, New York; 41.019722°N 73.946667°W | September 28 to October 7, 1780 | September 29 – British Major John André is tried and sentenced to death for spying. October 1 – Washington visits Preakness, New Jersey. October 2 – Major André hanged on nearby Gallows Hill. |
| | | Paramus, New Jersey | October 7 to 9, 1780 | |
| Returns to Theunis Dey Mansion | | 199 Totowa Road, Wayne, New Jersey; 40.915556°N 74.233333°W | October 9 to 26, 1780 | |
| William Crane House | | Valley Road and Claremont Avenue, Cranetown (now Montclair, New Jersey, 40.820556°N 74.22111°W | October 26, 1780 | Temporary headquarters. The house was torn down in 1900. |
| near Passaic Falls | | Preakness, New Jersey | October 27 to 30, 1780 | |
| Returns to Theunis Dey Mansion | | 199 Totowa Road, Wayne, New Jersey; 40.915556°N 74.233333°W | October 30 to November 27, 1780 | |
| | | Passaic, New Jersey | November 27 to 28, 1780 | |
| | | Morristown, New Jersey | November 28 to | |
| Returns to Colonel Thomas Ellison House | | 1048 River Rd, New Windsor, NY 12553 New Windsor, New York | December 6, 1780 to May 18, 1781 | The Thomas Ellison House was built by William Bull of Orange County, NY, in 1754. A copy of the contract is in possession of the William Bull and Sarah Wells Stone House Association. The house was one of five known houses built by Bull, an immigrant from Ireland. |
| Morgan's Tavern | | Litchfield, Connecticut | May 18 to 19, 1781 | |
| Joseph Webb House | | Wethersfield, Connecticut; 41.7120569°N 72.6531069°W | May 19 to 24, 1781 | |
| Cogswell's Tavern; William Cogswell, proprietor | | Christian Street, New Preston, Connecticut | May 24 to 25, 1781 | The tavern is now a private residence, owned by one of Cogswell's descendants. |
| Returns to Colonel Thomas Ellison House | | River Road, New Windsor, New York; 41.472976°N 74.015286°W | May 25 to June 26, 1781 | |
| Returns to Van Cortlandt Upper Manor House | | 110 Oregon Road, Cortlandt Manor, New York; 41.312222°N 73.906111°W | June 26 to July 2, 1781 | |
| churchyard and farmland near Old Dutch Church of Sleepy Hollow | | Sleepy Hollow, New York | July 2, 1781 | Daytime rest before the night march |
| Returns to Valentine's Mile Square | | Valentine's Hill, Yonkers, New York; 40.931141°N 73.864349°W | July 2 to 4, 1781 | Now the site of St. Joseph's Seminary. |
| "Appleby Place" (Joseph Appleby House) | | Secor Road, Philipsburg Manor farmland (now Hartsdale), New York; 41.025607°N 73.8278573°W | July 4 to 21, 1781 | Demolished. |
| Returns to Elijah Miller House | | Virginia Road, North White Plains, New York; 41.059167°N 73.770833°W | July 5 to 7, 1781 | July 6 – Washington visits French troops at White Plains. |
| | | King's Bridge, Bronx, New York City, New York | July 21 to 22, 1781 | |
| Returns to "Appleby Place" (Joseph Appleby House) | | Secor Road, Philipsburg Manor farmland (now Hartsdale), New York; 41.025607°N 73.8278573°W | July 23 to August 19, 1781 | Demolished. |
| | | King's Ferry (now Verplanck), New York | August 19 to 20, 1781 | |
| Joshua Hett Smith House, also known as "Treason House" | | Treason Hill, West Haverstraw, New York; 41.213333°N 73.988475°W | August 20 to 25, 1781 | On the march to Virginia, the combined Continental and French Armies cross to the west side of the Hudson River at King's Ferry. Demolished circa 1921. Now the site of Helen Hayes Hospital. |
| John Phenix's Tavern "at the Larger Cross Roads in Bedminster." | | Ramapo (now Mahwah), New Jersey | August 26 to 27, 1781 | |
| Jacob Morrel House | | 63 Main Street, Chatham, New Jersey; 40.739127°N 74.374471°W | August 27 to 29, 1781 | Now a restaurant. |
| | | Trenton, New Jersey | August 29 to 30, 1781 | |
| Robert Morris House | | Front Street, south of Dock Creek, Philadelphia, Pennsylvania | August 30 to September 5, 1781 | Demolished |
| | | Wilmington, Delaware | September 5 to 6, 1781 | |
| St. Patrick's Inn; John Pritchard, proprietor | | 108 West Main Street, Newark, Delaware; 39.683184°N 75.755982°W | September 6 to 7, 1781 | Demolished 1851 |
| | | Darlington, Maryland | September 7 to 8, 1781 | |
| Fountain Inn Tavern; Daniel Grant, proprietor | | SE corner of Baltimore & Hanover Streets, Baltimore, Maryland; 39.2893723°N 76.6162927°W | September 8 to 9, 1781 | September 8 – Expenses paid to Daniel Grant – £10.10.7. Demolished circa 1872. |
| | | | September 9, 1781 | Expenses "from Baltimore to my house" – £14.16.9. |
| Mount Vernon | | Fairfax County, Virginia; 38.707778°N 77.085833°W | September 9 to 12, 1781 | |
| | | Dumfries, Virginia | September 12 to 13, 1781 | |
| | | Bolling Green, Virginia? | September 13 to 14, 1781 | |
| George Wythe House | | west side of Palace Green, Williamsburg, Virginia; 37.271667°N 76.703333°W | September 14 to 17, 1781 | |
| Aboard the Queen Charlotte | | | September 17 to 22, 1781 | Washington sails down the James River to meet with French Admiral de Barras aboard the Ville de Paris, off Cape Henry Virginia. "Expenses of a Trip to the French Fleet off Cape Henry" – £25. |
| Returns to George Wythe House | | west side of Palace Green, Williamsburg, Virginia; 37.271667°N 76.703333°W | September 22 to 28, 1781 | |
| Encampment | | Yorktown, Virginia; 37.202533°N 76.532816°W | September 28 to 29, 1781 | September 28 – Siege of Yorktown begins. |
| | | | October 19, 1781 | British General Cornwallis surrenders at Yorktown |
| Burwell Bassett House, Eltham Plantation | | Eltham Road, Eltham, Virginia; 37.528808°N 76.839138°W | November 5 to 11, 1781 | November 5 – Washington rushes to the bedside of his stepson, John Parke Custis, who dies that day. Destroyed by fire in 1876. |
| Returns to Mount Vernon | | Fairfax County, Virginia; 38.707778°N 77.085833°W | November 13 to 20, 1781 | |
| | | Annapolis, Maryland | November 21 to 23, 1781 | |
| Governor John Penn House | | 242 South 3rd Street, Philadelphia, Pennsylvania; 39.94585°N 75.14683°W | November 26, 1781 to March 22, 1782 | Confiscated from Loyalist Governor John Penn. Following the October 1781 victory at Yorktown, George and Martha Washington spend the winter in Philadelphia. Demolished circa 1850. Image: The Governor John Penn House is in the background, right. |
| | | Trenton, New Jersey | March 23 to 24, 1782 | |
| Returns to John Wallace House | | 71 Somerset Street, Middlebrook (now Somerville), New Jersey; 40.568889°N 74.621944°W | March 24 to 25, 1782 | |
| Returns to Jacob Ford Mansion | | 30 Washington Place, Morristown, New Jersey; 40.797795°N 74.465203°W | March 25 to 28, 1782 | |
| Returns to Sloat House ("Mr. Lots House"). | | NY State Route 17 & Sterling Avenue, Sloatsburg, New York; 41.151687°N 74.193889°W | March 29 to 30, 1782 | |
| Returns to Colonel William Colfax House | | 2343 Paterson-Hamburg Turnpike, Pompton (now Wayne), New Jersey; 40.9875°N 74.279722°W | March 30 to 31, 1782 | Washington meets with Colonel Philip Van Cortlandt. Visits "York Hutts" (New York militia encampment). |
| Returns to Robert Erskine House | | Sloatsburg Road, Ringwood Manor State Park, Ringwood, New Jersey; 41.144444°N 74.252778°W | March 31, 1782 | Demolished or destroyed by fire by 1810. |
| Jonathan Hasbrouck House, Washington's Headquarters State Historic Site | | Washington Street, Newburgh, New York; 41.497778°N 74.01°W | March 31 to June 24, 1782 | |
| | | Poughkeepsie, New York | June 24, 1782 | |
| | | Albany, New York | June 26 to 28, 1782 | |
| | | Saratoga, New York | June 29 to 30, 1782 | |
| | | Albany, New York | June 30 to July 1, 1782 | |
| Returns to Jonathan Hasbrouck House, Washington's Headquarters State Historic Site | | Washington Street, Newburgh, New York; 41.497778°N 74.01°W | July 1 to 11 or 12, 1782 | |
| | | Philadelphia, Pennsylvania | July 14 to 22 or 23, 1782 | July 19 – Conference with French General Rochambeau. |
| Moravian Sun Inn | | 564 Main Street, Bethlehem, Pennsylvania; 40.621944°N 75.381667°W | July 24, 1782 | |
| Returns to Jonathan Hasbrouck House, Washington's Headquarters State Historic Site | | Washington Street, Newburgh, New York; 41.497778°N 74.01°W | July 28 to August 30, 1782 | August 17 – Visit to West Point |
| Encampment | | Verplanck's Point, New York; 41.249167°N 73.962222°W | August 31 to October 27, 1782 | Washington at Verplanck's Point (1790) by John Trumbull, depicts Washington, on September 14, 1782, reviewing the French troops under General Rochambeau on their return from Virginia after the victory at Yorktown. |
| Returns to Colonel Stephen Moore House | | Target Hill, United States Military Academy, West Point, New York; 41.402678°N 73.967565°W | October 27 to 28, 1782 | Demolished, possibly as early as 1812. Now the site of Target Hill Athletic Fields. Image: The Moore House is in the upper left corner of the fort. |
| Returns to Jonathan Hasbrouck House, Washington's Headquarters State Historic Site | | Washington Street, Newburgh, New York; 41.497778°N 74.01°W | October 28 to November 14 or 15, 1782 | |
| Cornelius Wynkoop Stone House | | 3721 Main Street, Marbletown, New York; 41.846667°N 74.145278°W | November 15 to 16, 1782 | |
| Major Christopher Tappen House | | North Front Street, Kingston, New York | November 16 to 17, 1782 | Demolished. November 16 – Washington visits the rebuilt Old Dutch Church, that had been burned by the British. |
| Colonel Johannes Hardenbergh House; Jacob Rutsen House | | Rosendale, New York | November 17, 1782 | The house burned July 5, 1911, and was demolished. November 17 – Washington dines with Col. Hardenbergh. |
| Returns to Jonathan Hasbrouck House, Washington's Headquarters State Historic Site | | Washington Street, Newburgh, New York; 41.497778°N 74.01°W | November 17 or 18, 1782 to May 3, 1783 | |
| | | Dobbs Ferry, New York | May 3 to 4, 1783 | |
| Returns to DeWint House | | 20 Livingston Avenue, Tappan, New York; 41.019722°N 73.946667°W | May 4 to 8, 1783 | Peace negotiations with Sir Guy Carleton |
| | | Dobbs Ferry, New York | May 8 to 9, 1783 | |
| Returns to Jonathan Hasbrouck House, Washington's Headquarters State Historic Site | | Washington Street, Newburgh, New York; 41.497778°N 74.01°W | May 9 to July 18, 1783 | May 16 – Washington visits Poughkeepsie, New York. |
| General Philip Schuyler Mansion | | 32 Catherine Street, Albany, New York; 42.639722°N 73.760556°W | July 18 to 19, 1783 | July 18 to August 5 – Tour of northern New York forts. "I have resolved to wear away a little Time, in performg a Tour to the Northward, as far as Tyconderoga & Crown–point – and perhaps as far up the Mohawk River as fort Schuyler—" |
| General Schuyler House | | Saratoga National Historical Park, Schuylerville, New York; 43.095692°N 73.582203°W | | Washington tours the Saratoga Battlefields with General Philip Schuyler. |
| Fort William Henry | | South end of Lake George, Lake George, New York; 43.420278°N 73.711111°W | | "Mr Dimler ... precedes us to make arrangments [sic], and particularly to have some light Boats provided & transported to Lake George that we may not be delayed on our Arrival there," |
| Fort Ticonderoga | | South end of Lake Champlain, Ticonderoga, New York; 43.841667°N 73.3875°W | | |
| Fort Crown Point | | West side of Lake Champlain, Crown Point, New York; 44.029167°N 73.431111°W | July 21, 1783? | |
| High Rock Spring? | | High Rock Park, Maple Avenue, Saratoga Springs, New York; 43.0863679°N 73.7801308°W | | July 26 – Washington dates at letter from Saratoga. Reputedly, Washington and General Schuyler camp at High Rock Spring. Image: High Rock Spring in 1875. |
| Fort Schenectady | | South side of the Mohawk River, Front & Ferry Streets, Schenectady, New York; 42.818258°N 73.946°W | | |
| Fort Johnstown | | North side of the Mohawk River, Perry & Montgomery Streets, Johnstown, New York; 43.003056°N 74.371111°W | | |
| Fort Rensselaer; Peter Wormuth House? | | South side of the Mohawk River, Wiles Park, Fort Plain, New York; 42.936706°N 74.636383°W | | Demolished. Image: Fort Rensselaer (marked "Old Fort Plains") is near the top of the map. |
| Fort Herkimer | | South side of the Mohawk River, German Flatts, New York; 43.016944°N 74.9525°W | August 1, 1783 | "I find it indispensably necessary to the public service that a magazine of Provisions should be laid up immediately at the Post of Fort Herkemer"; Demolished in 1840. |
| Fort Dayton | | North side of the Mohawk River, Herkimer, New York; 43.029167°N 74.99°W | | |
| Old Fort Schuyler | | South side of the Mohawk River, Main Street, Utica, New York; 43.10425°N 75.22441667°W | | |
| Fort Schuyler (formerly Fort Stanwix) | | North side of the Mohawk River, Park Street, Rome, New York; 43.210556°N 75.45525°W | | Located at the portage between the Mohawk River and Wood Creek. |
| Wood Creek | | 43.203333°N 75.693056°W | | |
| Lake Otsego, source of the Susquehanna River | | Council Rock Park, Cooperstown, New York; 42.701308°N 74.920416°W | | |
| Fort Alden | | Cherry Valley, New York; 42.808889°N 74.737222°W | | Located at the portage between Lake Otsego and the Mohawk River. |
| Van Alstyne House? | | Canajoharie, New York; 42.903333°N 74.572778°W | | |
| Returns to Fort Rensselaer | | South side of the Mohawk River, Wiles Park, Fort Plain, New York; 42.936706°N 74.636383°W | | August 3 – Washington dates a letter from Fort Rensselaer. Demolished. Image: Fort Rensselaer (marked "Old Fort Plains") is near the top of the map. |
| Returns to General Philip Schuyler Mansion | | 32 Catherine Street, Albany, New York; 42.639722°N 73.760556°W | August 4 to 5, 1783 | August 5 – Washington and his staff leave Albany by boat. Return to Newburgh. |
| Returns to Jonathan Hasbrouck House, Washington's Headquarters State Historic Site | | Washington Street, Newburgh, New York; 41.497778°N 74.01°W | August 5 to 19, 1783 | "I have lately made a tour through the Lakes George & Champlain as far as Crown point; then returning to Schenectady, I proceeded up the Mohawk river to Fort Schuyler (formerly Fort Stanwix), & crossed over to the Wood Creek which empties into the Oneida Lake, & affords the water communication with Ontario. I then traversed the country to the head of the Eastern Branch of the Susquehanna & viewed the Lake Otsego, & the portage between that lake & the Mohawk river at Canajohario." |
| Returns to Colonel Stephen Moore House | | Target Hill, United States Military Academy, West Point, New York; 41.402678°N 73.967565°W | August 19 to 20, 1783 | Demolished, possibly as early as 1812. Now the site of Target Hill Athletic Fields. Image: The Moore House is in the upper left corner of the fort. |
| Thomas or Nathan Birdsall House | | southeast of Fredericksburg, New Jersey | | Expenses paid "at Birdsalls" – £5.2.6. Demolished. |
| Major Johannes Joseph Blauvelt House | | Western Highway, Blauvelt, New York; 41.05645°N 73.95598°W | | Expenses paid "at Majr Blauvets for the use of his Hs [House] Furniture &c." – £18.13.4. |
| "Rockingham" (John Berrien House) | | Rocky Hill, New Jersey; 40.398333°N 74.625556°W | August 23 to November 10, 1783 | Congress is in session in nearby Princeton. Washington makes daily trips there to meet with them. He composed his Farewell Orders to the Armies of the United States here. August 23 to 31 – "To Beakman's Tavern in Princeton for Horses & Servants at Sundry times – £5.10.0."; The house was relocated in 1897, 1956, and 2001 because of quarry expansion. Now a state historic site near Kingston, New Jersey. |
| | | Hackensack, New Jersey | November 10, 1783 | Addressed the Militia Officers of Bergen County. |
| Returns to DeWint House | | 20 Livingston Avenue, Tappan, New York; 41.019722°N 73.946667°W | November 11 to 14, 1783 | Forced to stay here on the way to West Point by a snowstorm. "Lieutenant-Colonel Benjamin Walker's expense account shows the route from Rocky Hill to have been: Brunswick, Elizabethtown, Second River Ferry, Hackensack, Tappan, King's Ferry, and from King's Ferry to West Point by barge." |
| Returns to Colonel Stephen Moore House | | Target Hill, United States Military Academy, West Point, New York; 41.402678°N 73.967565°W | November 14 to 15, 1783 | Demolished, possibly as early as 1812. Now the site of Target Hill Athletic Fields. Image: The Moore House is in the upper left corner of the fort. |
| | | Poughkeepsie, New York | November 15 to 16 or 17, 1783 | |
| Returns to Colonel Stephen Moore House | | Target Hill, United States Military Academy, West Point, New York; 41.402678°N 73.967565°W | November 17 to 21, 1783 | Demolished, possibly as early as 1812. Now the site of Target Hill Athletic Fields. Image: The Moore House is in the upper left corner of the fort. |
| Egbert Benson's | | Poughkeepsie, New York | November 21 to 22, 1783 | |
| Blue Bell Tavern; Jacob Moore, proprietor | | Broadway & 181st Street, Harlem, Manhattan, New York City, New York | November 22 to 24, 1783 | Demolished in 1876. |
| Leggett's Halfway Tavern | | west of 5th Avenue & 106th Street, Harlem, Manhattan, New York City, New York | November 24 to 25, 1783 | Now part of Central Park. |
| | | | | November 25 – British evacuation from New York City. |
| Bull's Head Tavern | | The Bowery, below Canal Street, Manhattan, New York City, New York; 40.716106°N 73.996556°W | November 25 to 26, 1783 | Destroyed by fire in 1828. |
| Fraunces Tavern | | Broad & Pearl Streets, Manhattan, New York City, New York; 40.703333°N 74.011389°W | November 26 to December 4, 1783 | December 4 – Washington's farewell dinner with his officers. |

== See also ==
- List of George Washington articles
- Neutral Ground of Westchester County in the Revolutionary War

== General sources ==
- "Washington's Revolutionary War Itinerary and the Location of His Headquarters, 1775–1783". The Papers of George Washington, University of Virginia. 16 June 2018.
- William Spohn Baker, Itinerary of General Washington from June 15, 1775, to December 23, 1783, (Philadelphia: J.B. Lippincott Company, 1892).
- Elijah Fisher's Journal while in the War for Independence, William B. Lapham, ed. (Augusta, Maine: Press of Badger and Manley, 1880). Fisher joined Washington's life-guards March 30, 1778, while at Valley Forge.
- Bernard Christian Steiner, The Life and Correspondence of James McHenry: Secretary of War under Washington and Adams (Burrow Brothers Company, 1907).
