= Village Inn (Englishtown, New Jersey) =

- U.S. National Register of Historic Places
- New Jersey Register of Historic Places
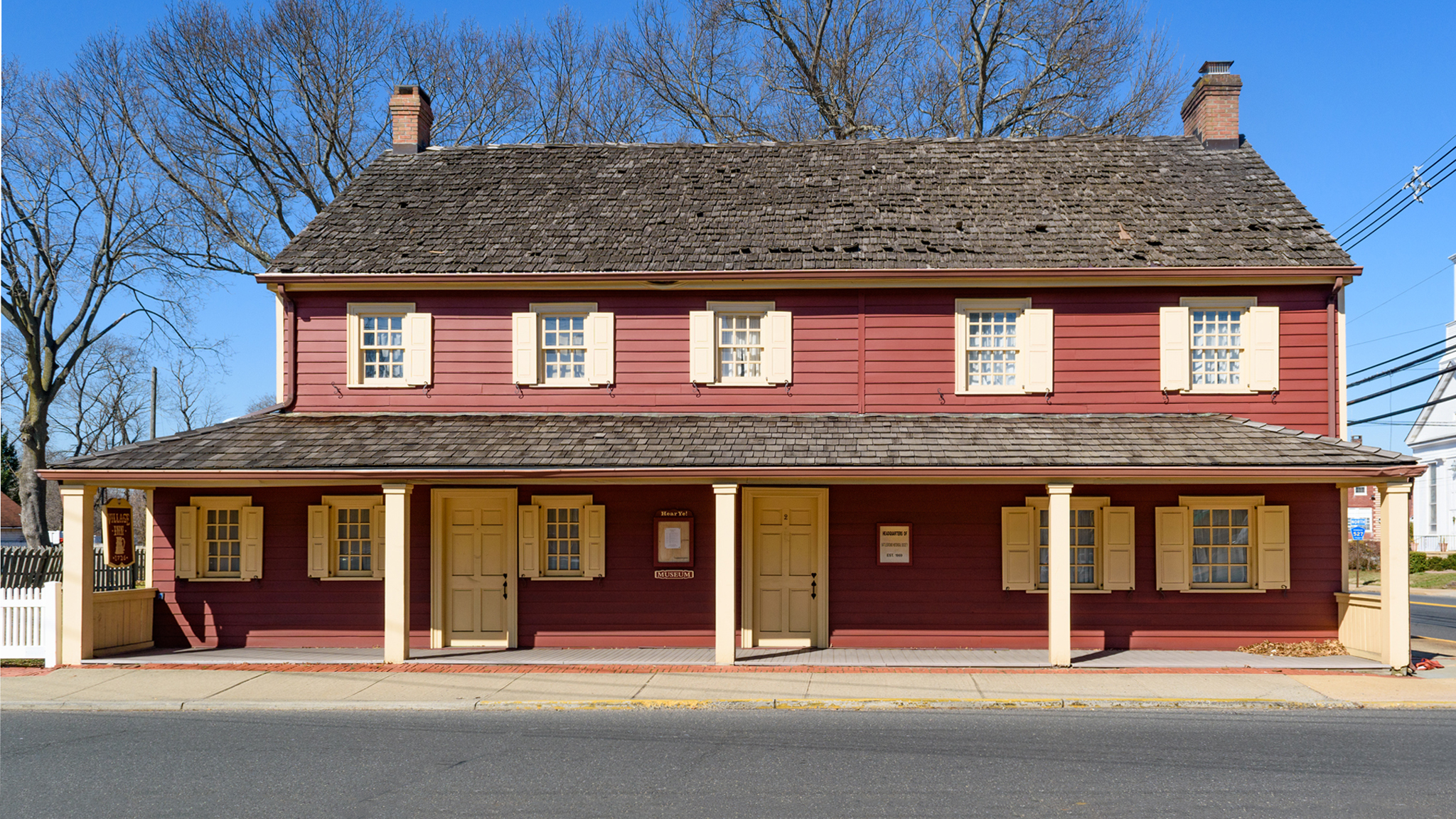

- Location within Monmouth County, New Jersey Location within New Jersey Location within the United States
- Location: Water and Main Streets; Englishtown, New Jersey
- Coordinates: 40°17′50″N 74°21′34″W
- Built: 1732
- NRHP reference No.: 72000802
- NJRHP No.: 1969

Significant dates
- Added to NRHP: November 13, 1972
- Designated NJRHP: October 26, 1972

The Village Inn, also known as the Davis Tavern, is located at the corner of Water and Main Streets in the borough of Englishtown in Monmouth County, New Jersey. The oldest section of the building dates to 1732. It was documented by the Historic American Buildings Survey in 1936, with addendum in 1984. The tavern was added to the National Register of Historic Places on November 13, 1972, for its significance in architecture and military history.

== History and description ==
In 1727, Robert Newell purchased 30 acres (12 ha), including the site of the house. In 1749, Thomas Davis purchased 130 acres (53 ha), including the house, from Newell. By 1755, the house is expanded. In 1762, Thomas Davis sells the house to his son, Moses Davis, who later operates it as a tavern. In 1777, the tavern was sold to Daniel Herbert.

During the American Revolutionary War, it was George Washington's Headquarters. Here, on June 30, 1778, Washington started the court-martial of General Charles Lee, for his actions during the Battle of Monmouth.

In 1978, it was sold to the Battleground Historical Society.

The Village Inn Englishtown is open for tours, 3rd Sunday of each month 1p to 4p.

== See also ==
- National Register of Historic Places listings in Monmouth County, New Jersey
- List of Washington's Headquarters during the Revolutionary War
