= Millstone Historic District =

Historic district in New Jersey, United States

- U.S. National Register of Historic Places
- U.S. Historic district
- New Jersey Register of Historic Places
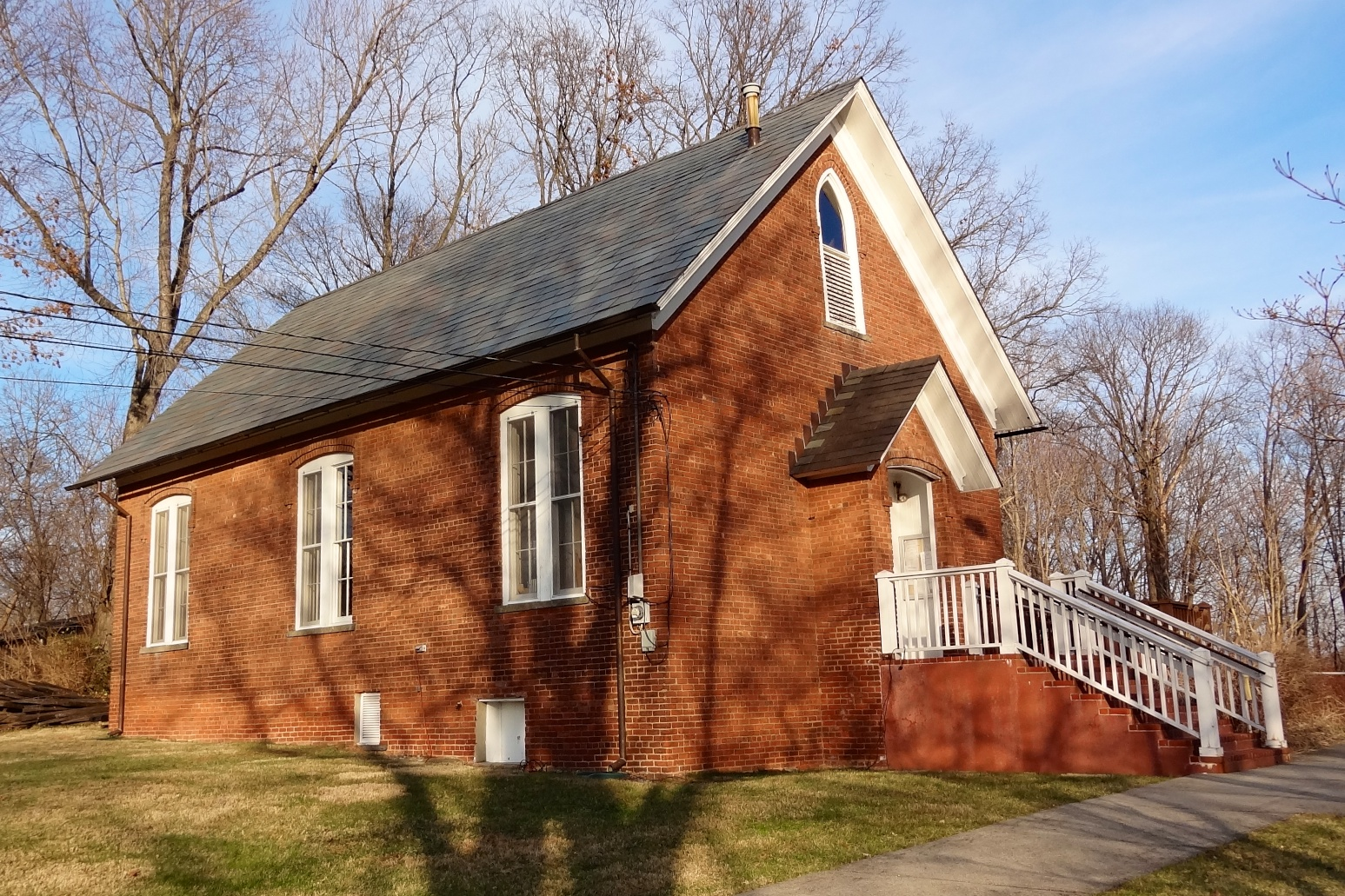
- Borough Hall

- Location within Somerset County, New Jersey Location within New Jersey Location within the United States
- Location: Amwell and River Roads, Millstone, New Jersey
- Coordinates: 40°29′56″N 74°35′18″W
- Area: 80 acres (32 ha)
- Built: 1777
- Architectural style: Mid 19th Century Revival, Federal, Dutch Colonial
- NRHP reference No.: 76001188
- NJRHP No.: 2533

Significant dates
- Added to NRHP: September 13, 1976
- Designated NJRHP: October 4, 1974

The Millstone Historic District is a historic district located in Millstone, Somerset County, New Jersey. The district was added to the National Register of Historic Places on September 13, 1976 for its significance in education, military history, settlement, and transportation. It includes 58 contributing buildings.

== Significant contributing properties ==
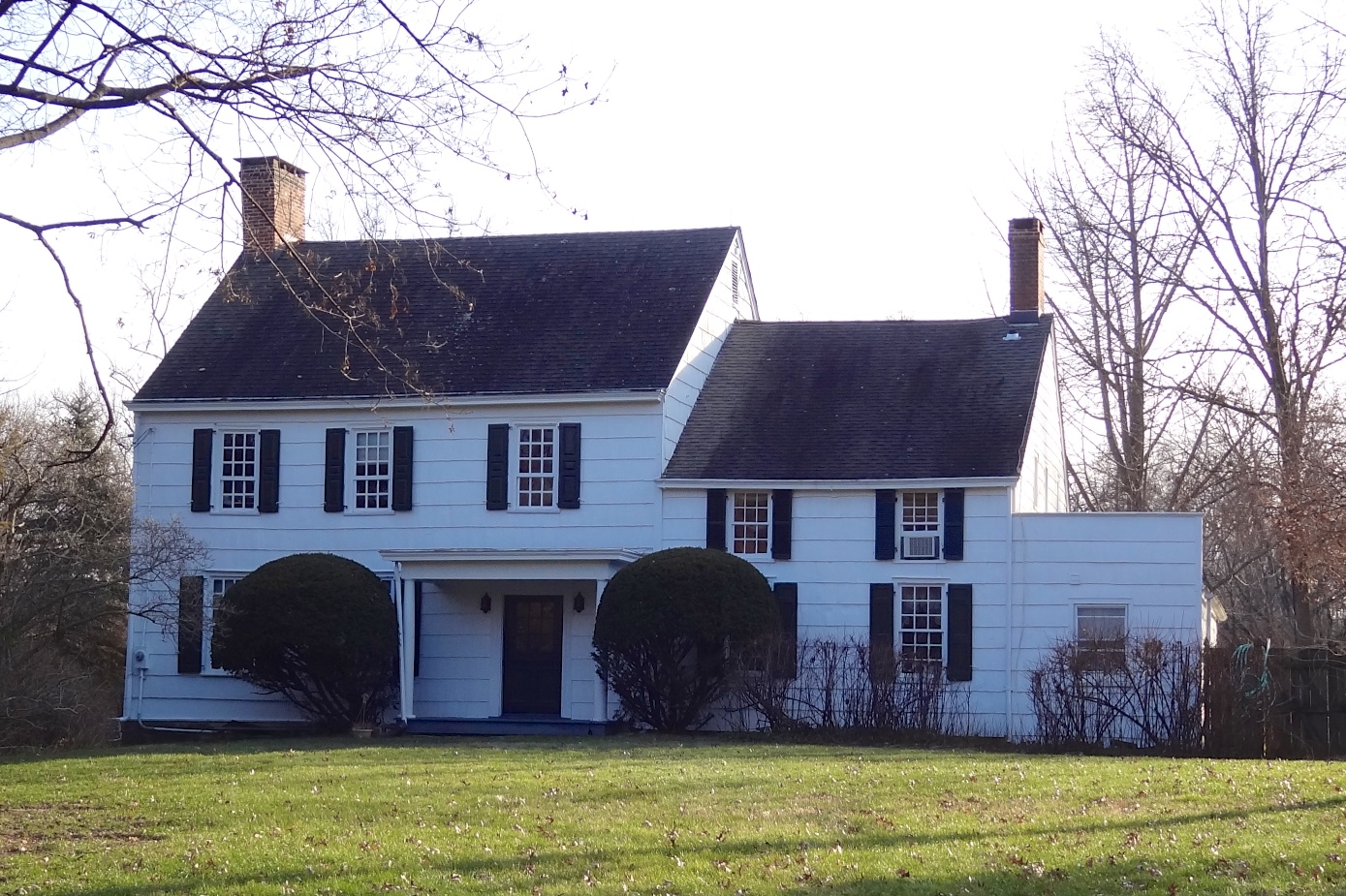
John Van Doren House

The John Van Doren House was built c. 1755. It served as the headquarters for General George Washington on the night of January 3–4, 1777, after the Battle of Princeton.

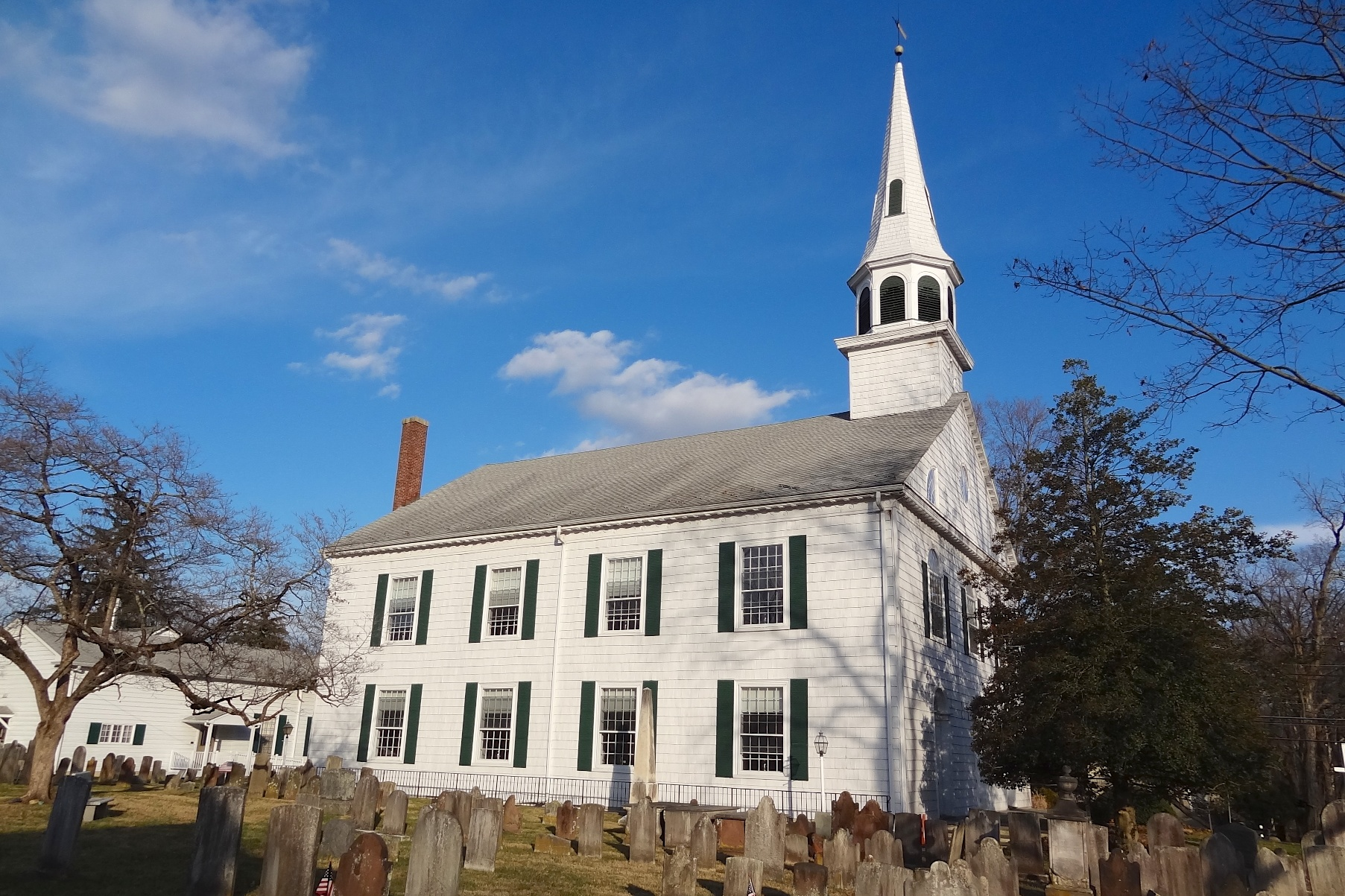
Hillsborough Reformed Church

The Hillsborough Reformed Church was built 1828. The congregation has been active since 1766.

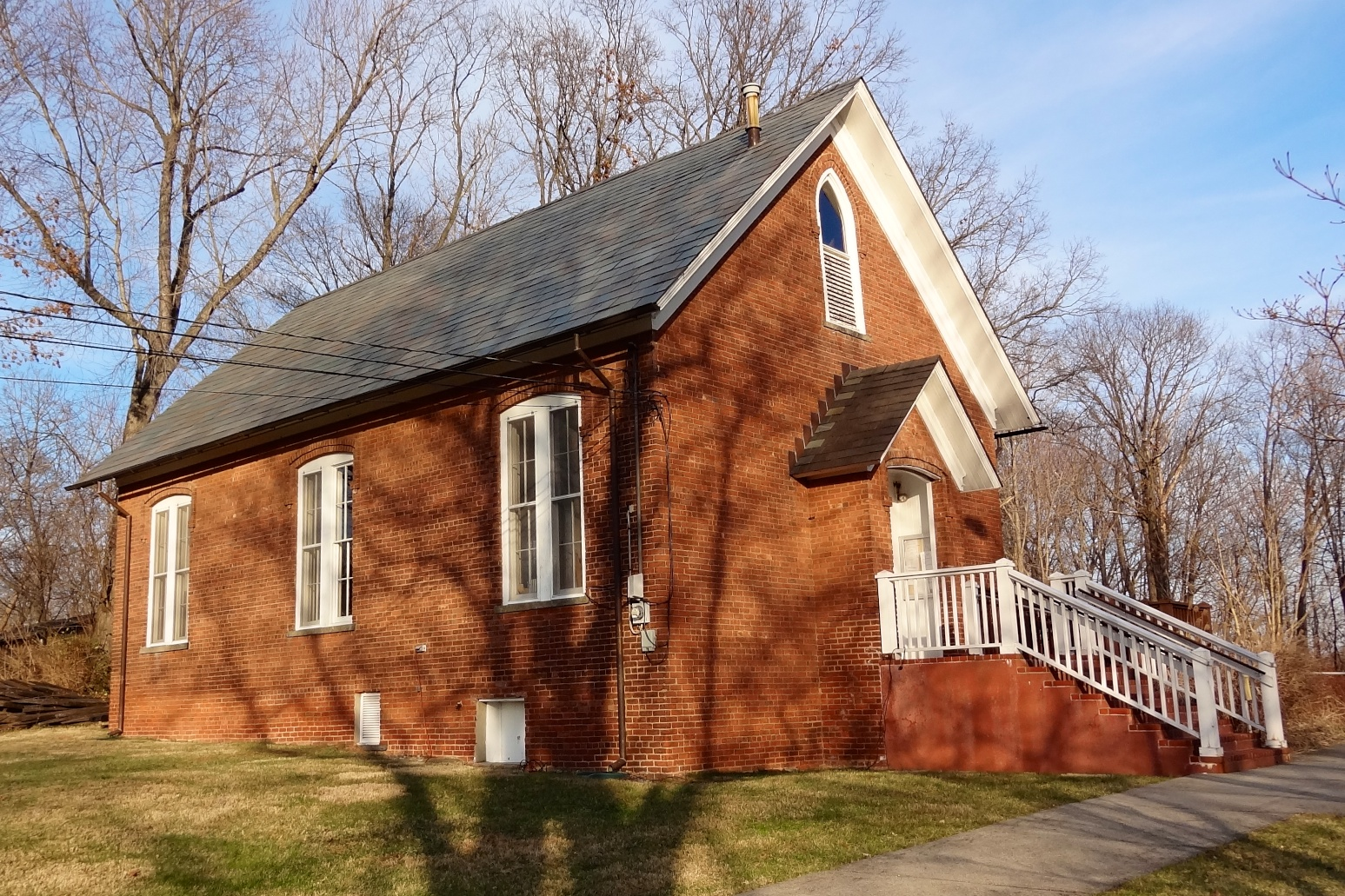
Borough Hall

Borough Hall was built c. 1850. It was a one-room school house from 1860 to 1944.

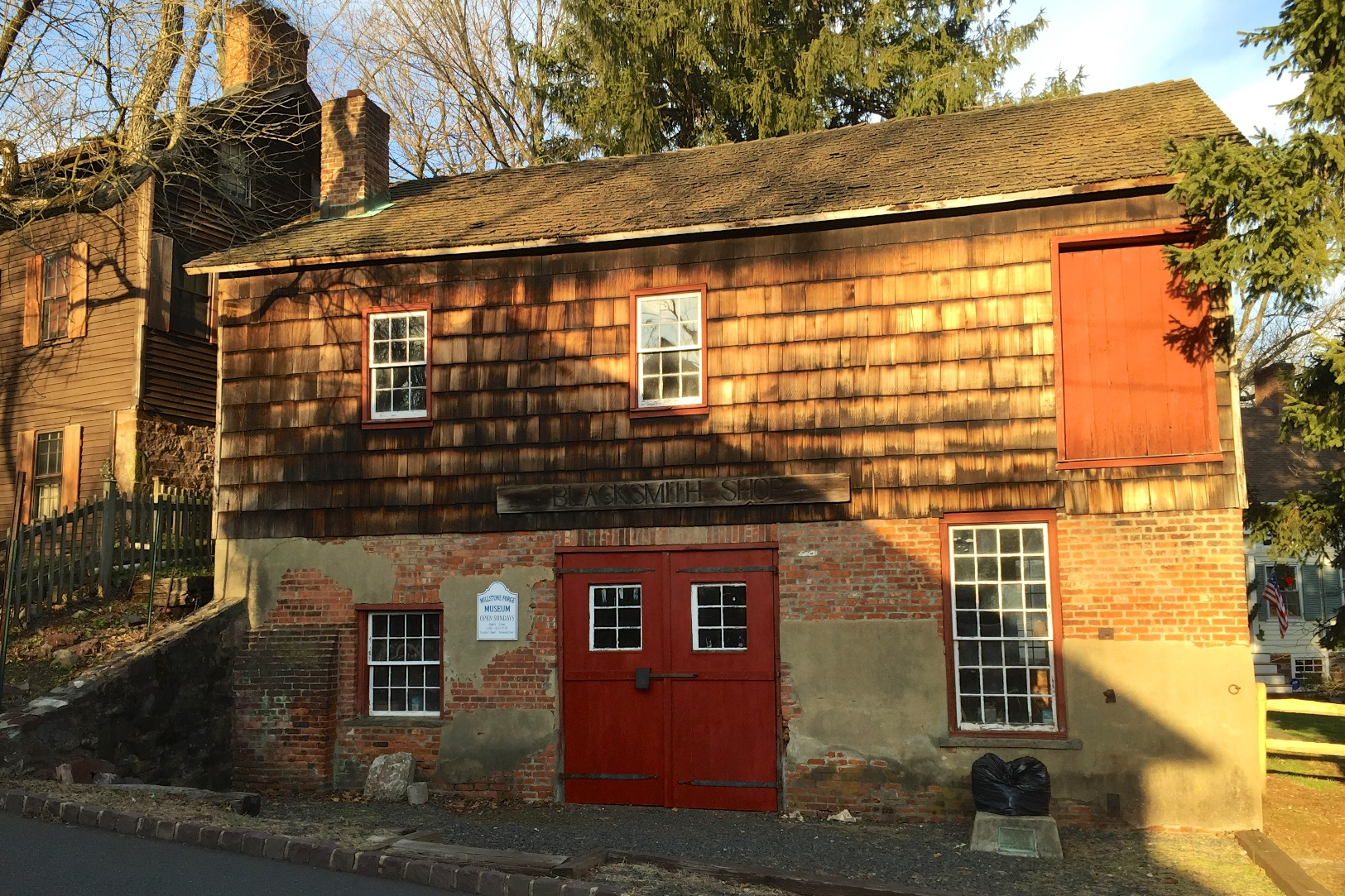
Blacksmith Shop

The Blacksmith Shop, also called the Old Millstone Forge, was built c. 1740. It now serves as a museum.

== See also ==
- National Register of Historic Places listings in Somerset County, New Jersey
- List of the oldest buildings in New Jersey
