= Joseph Stout House =

- U.S. National Register of Historic Places
- New Jersey Register of Historic Places
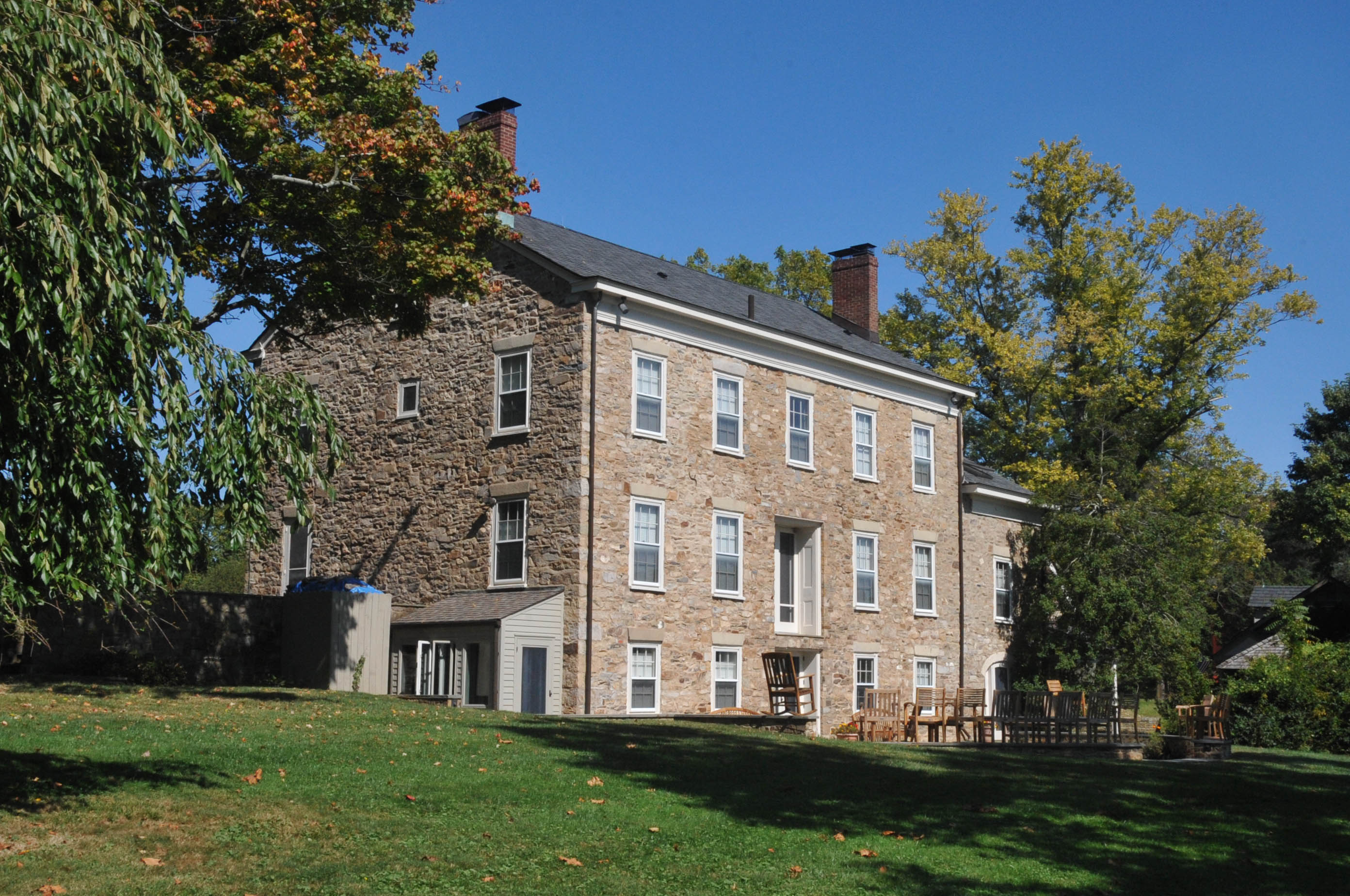

- Location within Mercer County, New Jersey Location within New Jersey Location within the United States
- Location: Province Line Road, Hopewell Township, New Jersey
- Coordinates: 40°24′34″N 74°44′44″W
- Area: 54 acres (22 ha)
- Built: 1752
- NRHP reference No.: 74001169
- NJRHP No.: 1700

Significant dates
- Added to NRHP: October 29, 1974
- Designated NJRHP: July 1, 1974

The Joseph Stout House, also known as the Hunt House and the Weart–Hunt House, is a historic stone house built in 1752 and located on Province Line Road in the Stoutsburg section of Hopewell Township in Mercer County, New Jersey, United States. It was documented by the Historic American Buildings Survey (HABS) in 1937. The house was added to the National Register of Historic Places on October 29, 1974, for its significance in military and religion history.

== History and description ==
The fieldstone house was built in 1752 by Joseph Stout, one of the founders of the First Baptist Church of Hopewell. It is located on a hillside, the north elevation is two stories high and the south is three. During the American Revolutionary War, John Price Hunt lived here. On June 24, 1778, General George Washington held a council of war here in preparation for the Battle of Monmouth. In 1789, Wilson Stout sold the property to Jacob Weart. In 1853, Spencer Weart may have made extensive changes to the house. It remained in the Weart family until 1928. Currently it is owned by Robert Wilson, who planted the Pheasant Hill Vineyard above and below the house. Pheasant Hill is tended to by Unionville Vineyards, of which Wilson is also owner.

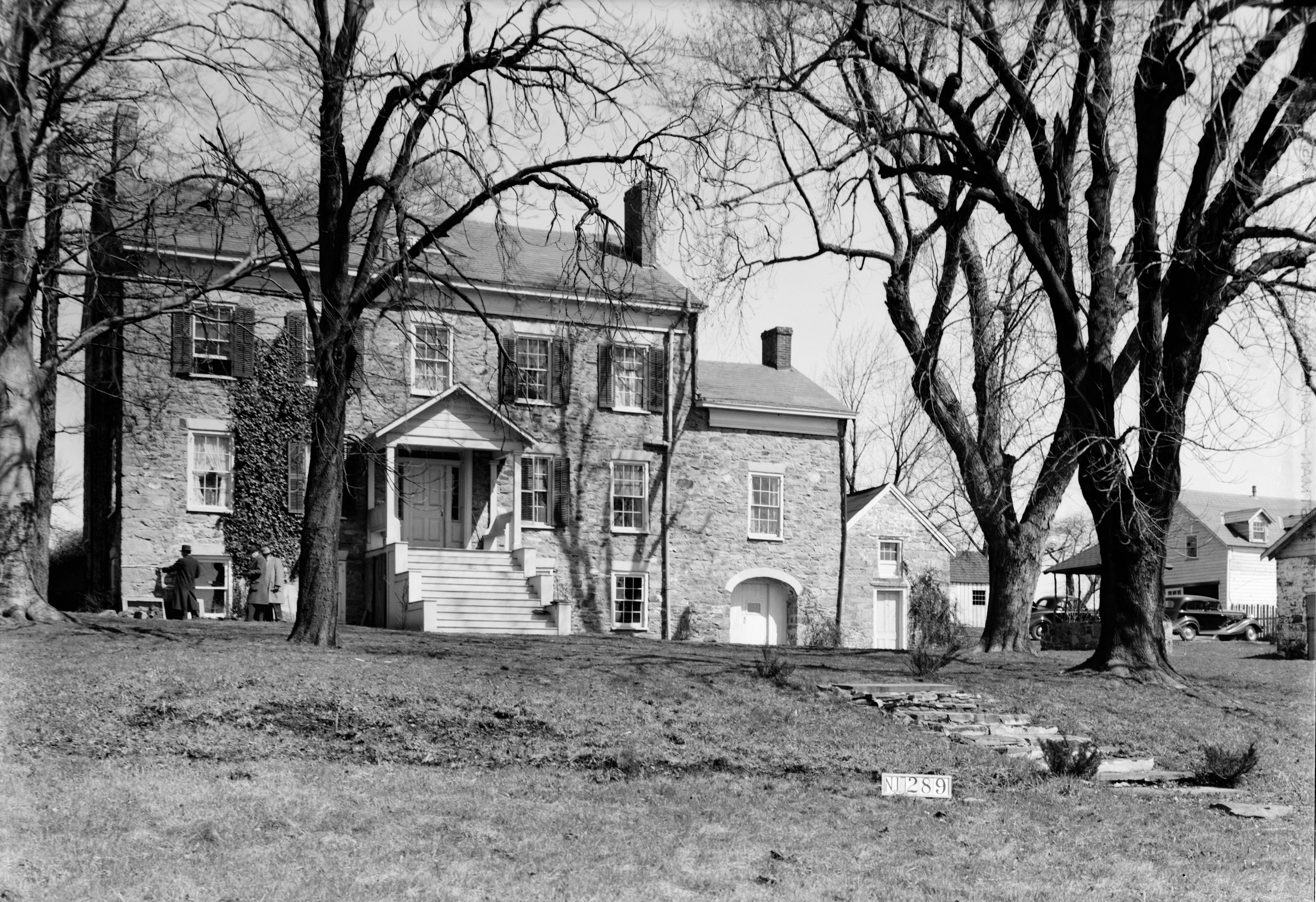
HABS photo from 1937

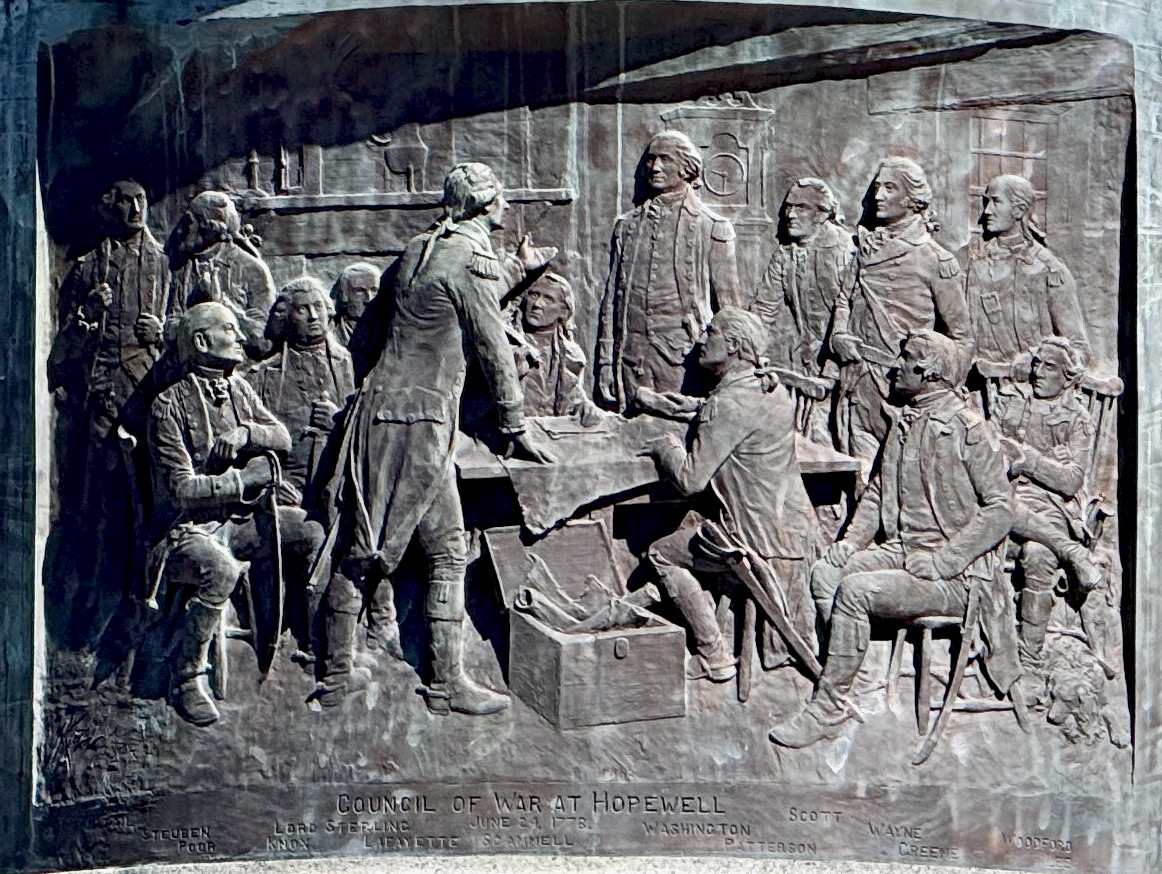
Council of War plague on the Monmouth Battle Monument

== See also ==
- National Register of Historic Places listings in Mercer County, New Jersey
- List of the oldest buildings in New Jersey
- List of Washington's Headquarters during the Revolutionary War
