= City Tavern =

Historic Philadelphia restaurant

Coordinates: 39.947128°N 75.144558°W

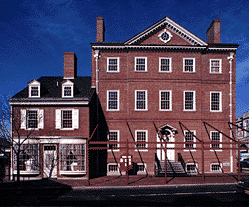
- The façade of the building
- Interactive map of City Tavern

Restaurant information
- Established: 1973
- Closed: October 31, 2020
- Owner: National Park Service
- Food type: Colonial Cuisine
- Location: 138, South 2nd Street, Walnut Street, Philadelphia, Pennsylvania, 19106, United States
- Website: https://www.nps.gov/places/city-tavern.htm

City Tavern is a late-20th century replica of a historic 18th-century tavern and hotel which once stood on the site. The original tavern was frequented by the Founding Fathers of the United States and other colonial leaders. The original building partially burned in 1834; the remains were demolished in 1854.

Located in what is now Independence National Historical Park, a replica of the structure was opened in 1976 for the American Bicentennial and operated as a restaurant serving a menu inspired by 18th-century recipes.

Since 1994, City Tavern Restaurant had been operated at the location by chef Walter Staib. The restaurant closed in late 2020 as a result of the COVID-19 pandemic.

== History ==
The land on which City Tavern was built was conveyed in 1772 by Samuel Powel to a group of seven wealthy citizens. The building was completed by subscription at a cost of more than £3,000. John Adams called it the "most genteel tavern in America", and it was a favorite meeting place of some of the Founding Fathers and members of the First Continental Congress.

In the lead-up to the American Revolution, on May 20, 1774, more than 200 men gathered in the gallery of the building to respond to the request for assistance from Bostonians following the passage of the Boston Port Bill. Many other important events took place at the building in the first few decades of the new nation; for example, the first Fourth of July celebration was held at the building in 1777, marking the anniversary of America's Independence from Britain, and General George Washington first met the Marquis de Lafayette at City Tavern in 1777.

The building was partially destroyed by fire on March 22, 1834, and was completely demolished by 1854. The present building was constructed in the 1970s and opened in 1976 for the United States Bicentennial as a functioning tavern and restaurant. From 1994 to 2020, it was operated by Walter Staib, a chef and host of the television shows A Taste of History and Black Forest Cuisine: The Classic Blending of European Flavors.

The Tavern closed in 2020 because of a severe downturn in business due to the COVID-19 pandemic. The National Park Service put the property up for a new lease in 2022.

== See also ==
- List of Washington's Headquarters during the Revolutionary War
