= Stoutsburg, New Jersey =

Populated place in Mercer and Somerset counties, New Jersey, US

- Unincorporated community
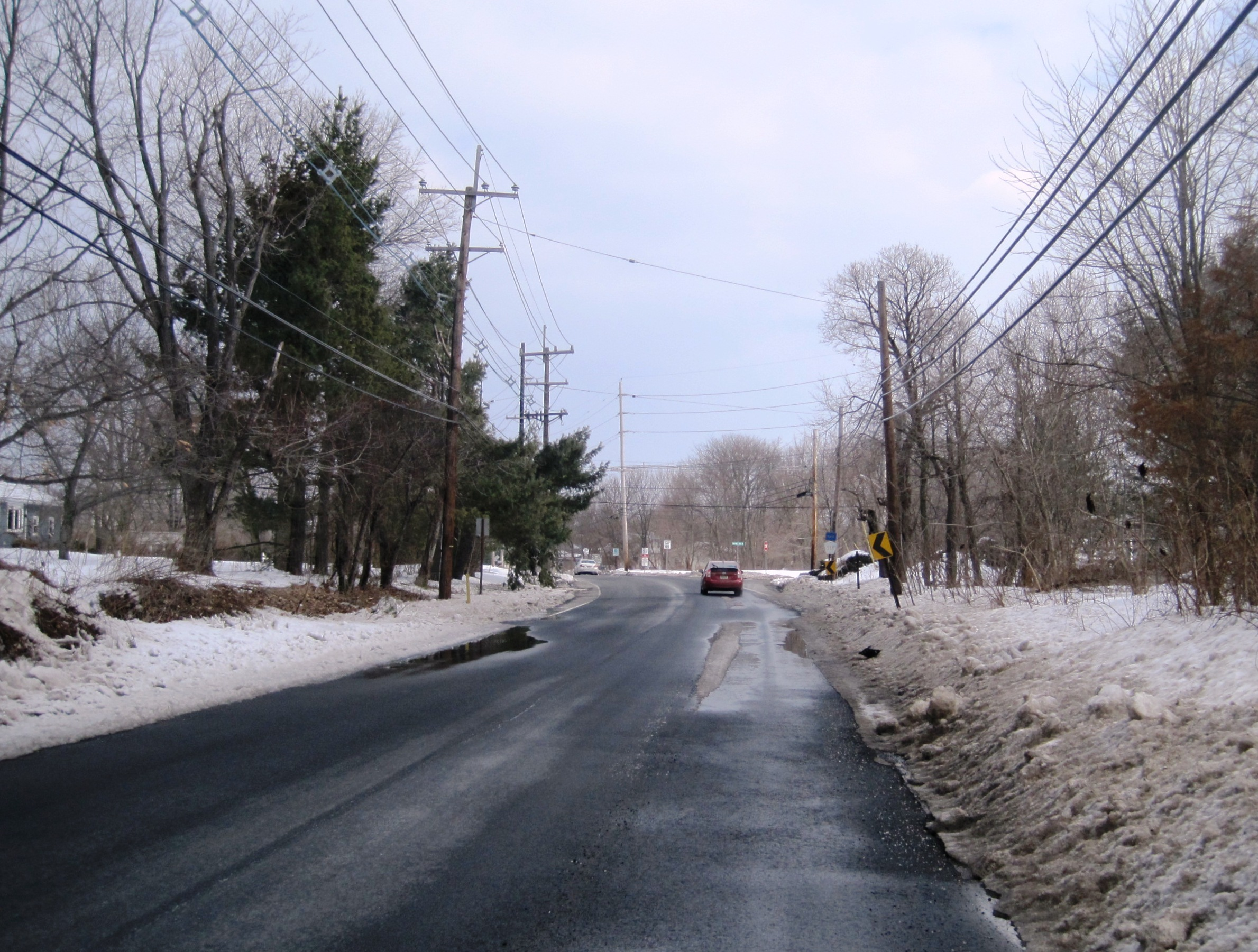
- Center of Stoutsburg along CR 518

- Location within Mercer County, New Jersey Location within Somerset County, New Jersey Location within New Jersey Location within the United States
- Coordinates: 40°23′55″N 74°44′08″W
- Country: United States
- State: New Jersey
- County: Mercer and Somerset
- Township: Hopewell and Montgomery
- Elevation: 157 ft (48 m)
- GNIS feature ID: 880956

Stoutsburg is an unincorporated community located along the border of Hopewell Township in Mercer County and Montgomery Township in Somerset County, in the U.S. state of New Jersey. County Route 518 passes through the community from the east and west, while Province Line Road passes through north and south. Province Line Road follows the Keith line which formerly separated the provinces of West Jersey and East Jersey, now parts of Hopewell and Montgomery townships respectively.

== History ==
On June 24, 1778, during the American Revolutionary War, General George Washington held a council of war at the Joseph Stout House (Hunt House) located here in preparation for the Battle of Monmouth.

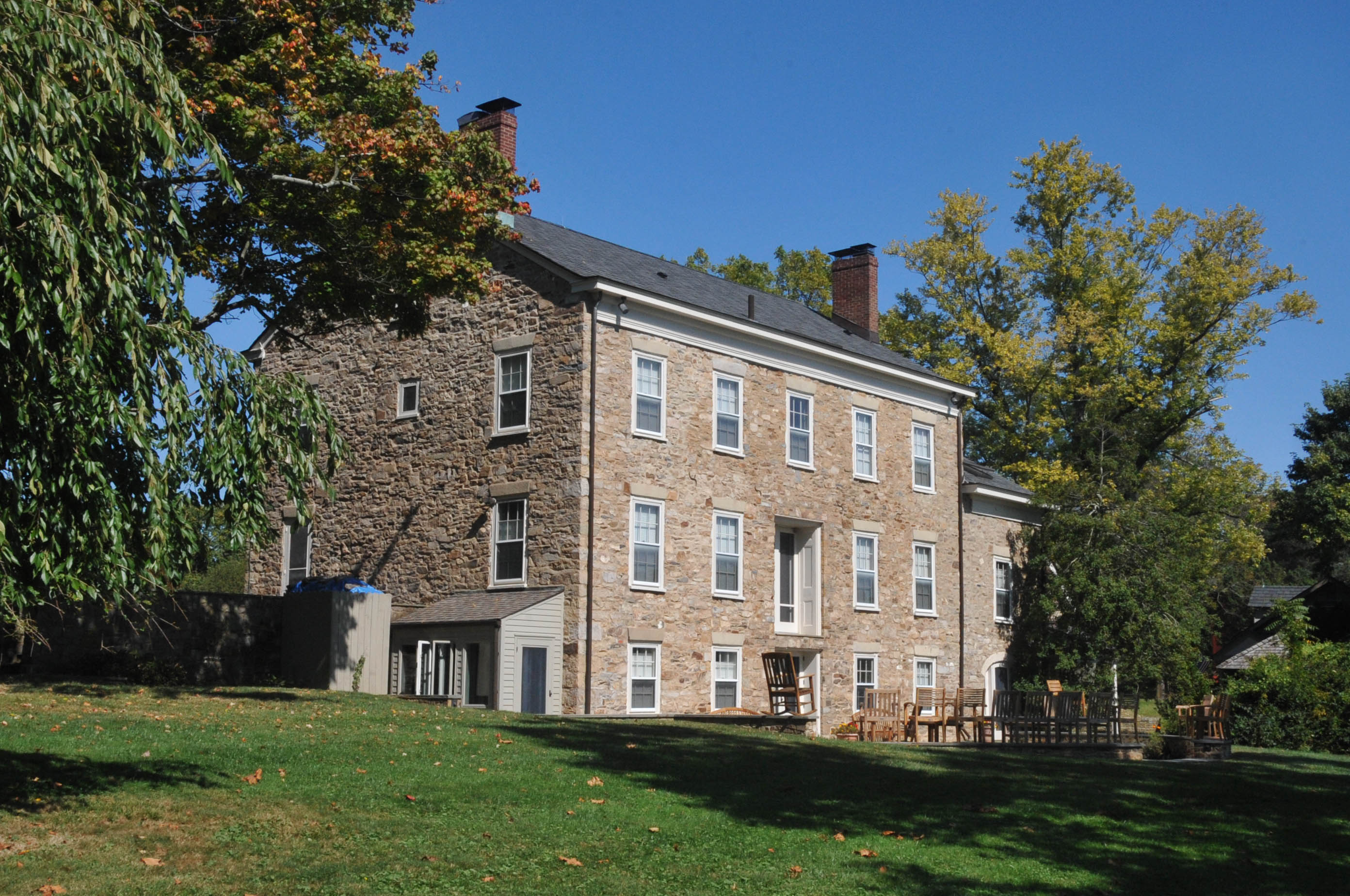
The Joseph Stout House, listed on the National Register of Historic Places

== Education ==
All of Hopewell Township, including Stoutsburg, is served by the Hopewell Valley Regional School District.
