= Millstone, New Jersey =

Borough in Somerset County, New Jersey, US

- Borough
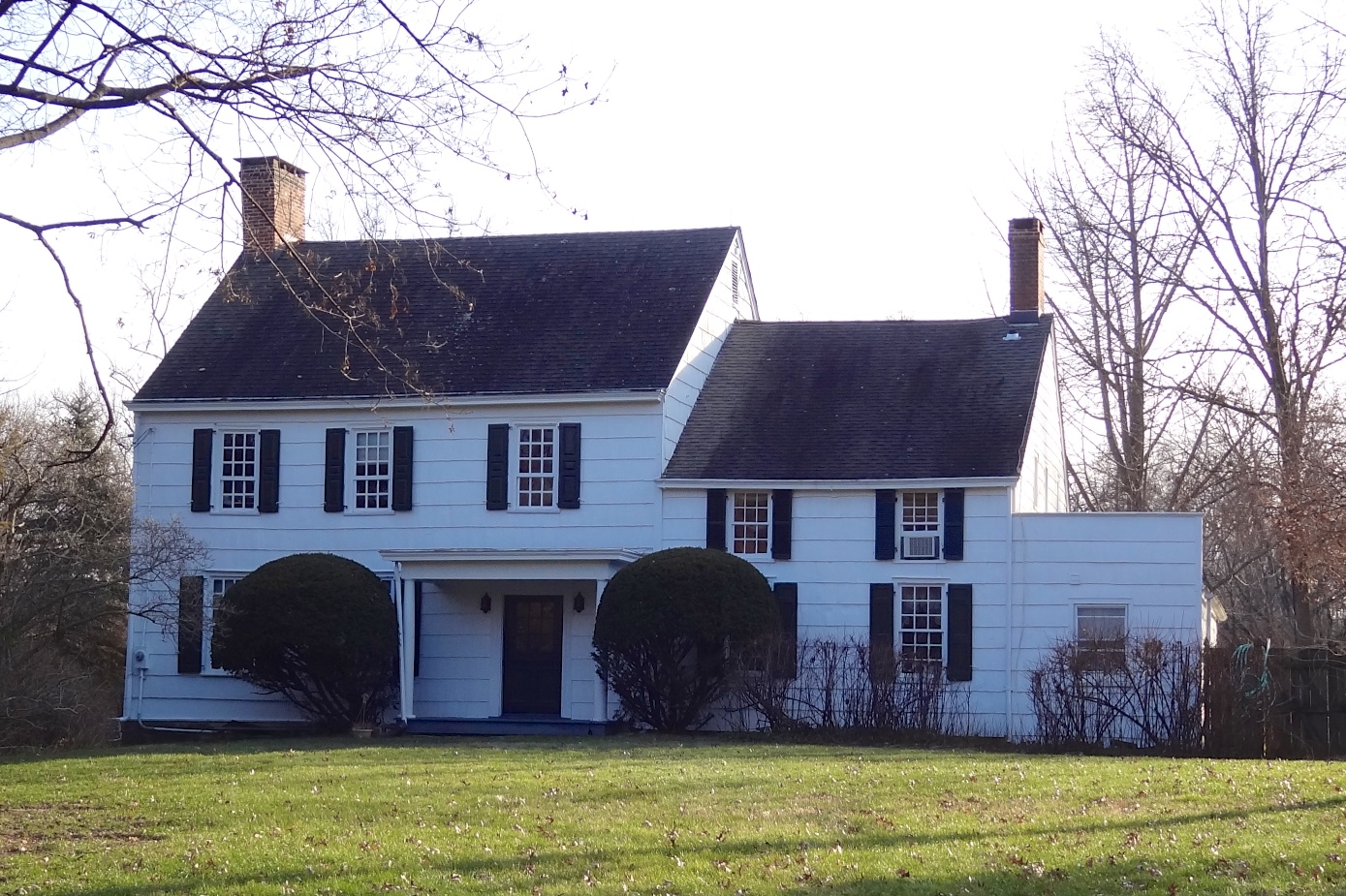
- John Van Doren House

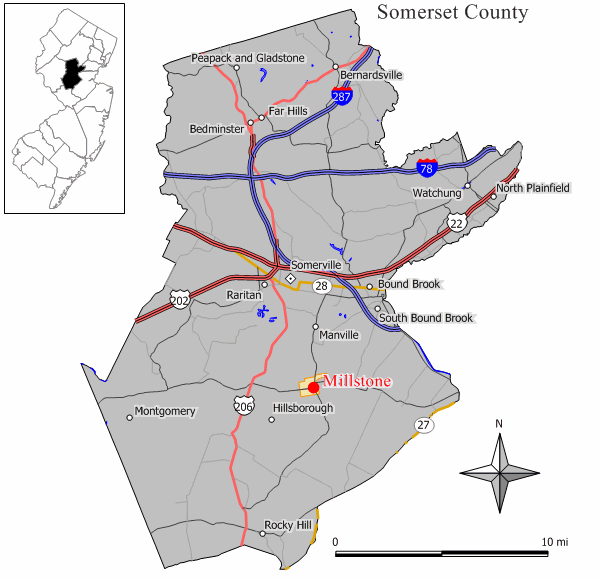
- Location of Millstone in Somerset County highlighted in yellow (right). Inset map: Location of Somerset County in New Jersey highlighted in black (left).

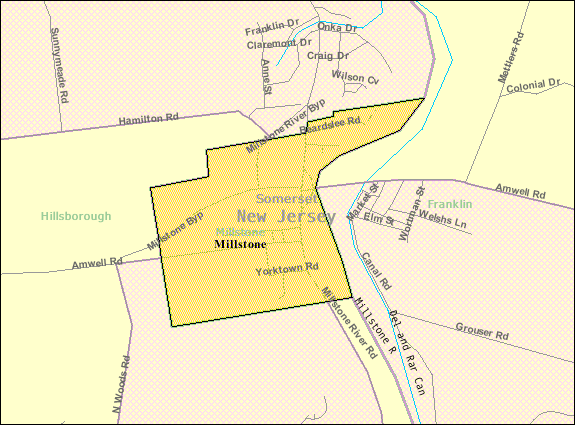
- Census Bureau map of Millstone, New Jersey

- Location in Somerset County Location in New Jersey Location in the United States
- Coordinates: 40.499868°N 74.595529°W
- Country: United States
- State: New Jersey
- County: Somerset
- Incorporated: May 14, 1894
- Named for: The Millstone River

Government
  - Type: Borough
  - Body: Borough Council
  - Mayor: Raymond Heck (D, term ends December 31, 2023)
  - Municipal clerk: Gregory Bonin

Area
  - Total: 0.70 sq mi (1.82 km^{2})
  - Land: 0.68 sq mi (1.76 km^{2})
  - Water: 0.019 sq mi (0.05 km^{2}) 2.86%
  - Rank: 530th of 565 in state 20th of 21 in county
- Elevation: 56 ft (17 m)

Population (2020)
  - Total: 448
  - Estimate (2023): 446
  - Rank: 555th of 565 in state 21st of 21 in county
  - Density: 658.3/sq mi (254.2/km^{2})
  - Rank: 423rd of 565 in state 17th of 21 in county
- Time zone: UTC−05:00 (Eastern (EST))
  - Summer (DST): UTC−04:00 (Eastern (EDT))
- ZIP Code: 08844
- Area codes: 732 and 908
- FIPS code: 3403546590
- GNIS feature ID: 0885302
- Website: www.millstoneboro.org

Millstone is a borough in Somerset County, in the U.S. state of New Jersey. The borough was originally known as Somerset Courthouse and was the county seat. As of the 2020 United States census, the borough's population was 448, an increase of 30 (+7.2%) from the 2010 census count of 418, which in turn reflected an increase of 8 (+2.0%) from the 410 counted in the 2000 census.

Millstone was incorporated as a borough by an act of the New Jersey Legislature on May 14, 1894, from portions of Hillsborough Township, based on the results of a referendum held that day. The borough was reincorporated on March 12, 1928. The borough was named for the Millstone River (a major tributary of the Raritan River), whose name derives from an incident in which a millstone was dropped into it.

A historic district in Millstone, including 58 buildings, was added to the National Register of Historic Places in 1976. The borough possesses a military significance for 1700–1749, 1750–1799, 1850–1874.

New Jersey Monthly magazine ranked Millstone as its 7th best place to live in its 2008 rankings of the "Best Places To Live" in New Jersey.

== History ==
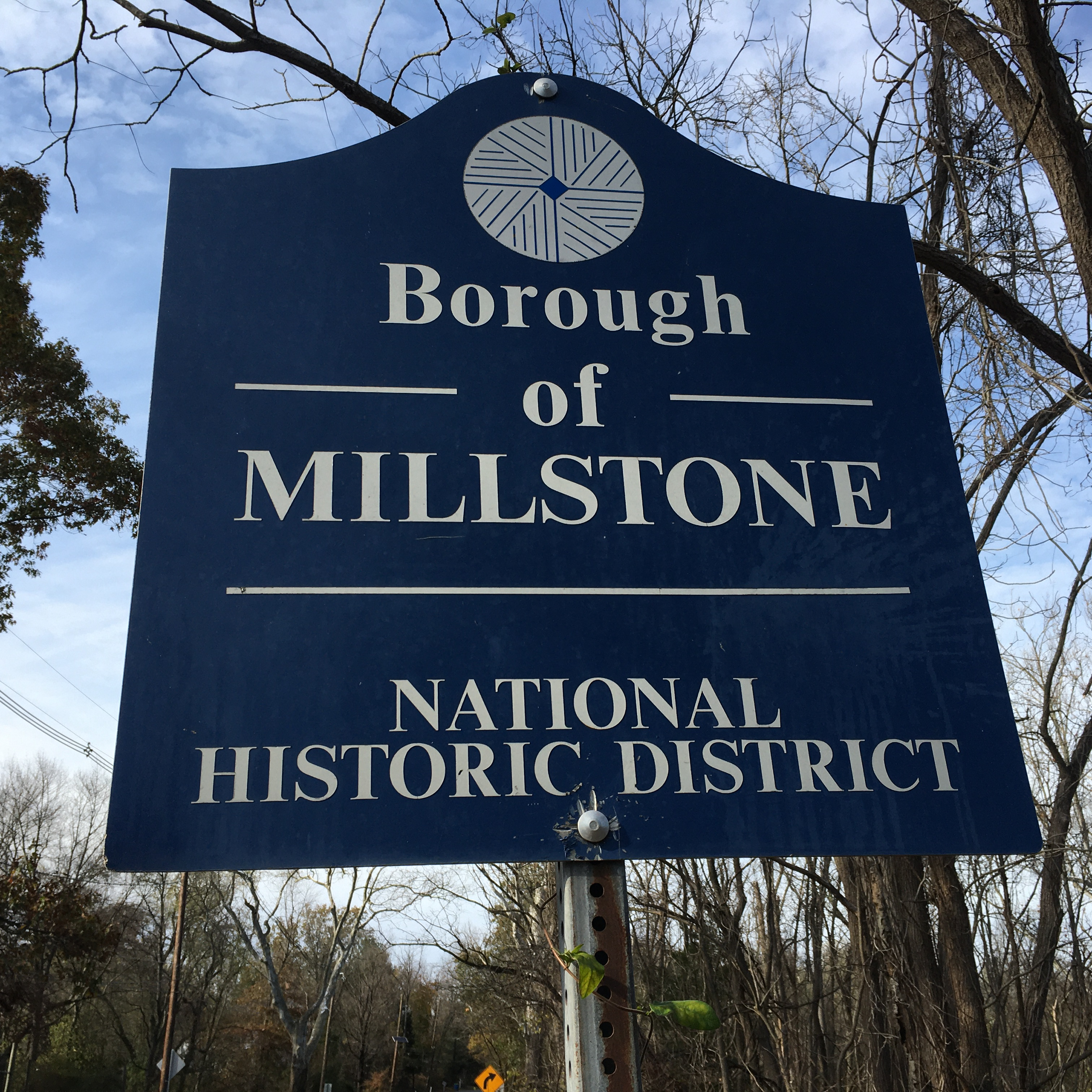
Millstone National Historic District

Millstone, then called Somerset Courthouse, was the county seat of Somerset County from 1738 until the British burned it to the ground in 1779 during the American Revolutionary War. After the victory at Princeton on January 3, 1777, General George Washington headquartered at the Van Doren house, while the army camped nearby that night. The next day, they marched to Pluckemin on the way to their winter encampment at Morristown.

Millstone was briefly connected to the Pennsylvania Railroad when the Mercer and Somerset Railway was extended to the town in the 1870s and connected via a bridge across the Millstone River to the Pennsylvania Railroad's Millstone and New Brunswick Railroad, but that arrangement did not last into the 1880s. Remnants of the railroad bridge can still be seen.

== Geography ==
According to the United States Census Bureau, the borough had a total area of 0.70 square miles (1.82 km^{2}), including 0.68 square miles (1.76 km^{2}) of land and 0.02 square miles (0.05 km^{2}) of water (2.86%).

The borough borders Franklin Township and Hillsborough Township.

=== Ecology ===
According to the A. W. Kuchler U.S. potential natural vegetation types, Millstone would have an Appalachian Oak (104) vegetation type with an Eastern Hardwood Forest (25) vegetation form.

== Demographics ==
Historical population
Census	Pop.	Note	%±
1900	200		—
1910	157		−21.5%
1920	178		13.4%
1930	187		5.1%
1940	252		34.8%
1950	289		14.7%
1960	409		41.5%
1970	630		54.0%
1980	530		−15.9%
1990	450		−15.1%
2000	410		−8.9%
2010	418		2.0%
2020	448		7.2%
2023 (est.)	446	▼	−0.4%
Population sources: 1900–1920; 1900–1910 1910–1930 1940–2000; 2000 2010 2020

=== 2010 census ===
The 2010 United States census counted 418 people, 162 households, and 118 families in the borough. The population density was 566.5 per square mile (218.7/km^{2}). There were 167 housing units at an average density of 226.3 per square mile (87.4/km^{2}). The racial makeup was 95.69% (400) White, 1.20% (5) Black or African American, 0.00% (0) Native American, 1.67% (7) Asian, 0.00% (0) Pacific Islander, 0.96% (4) from other races, and 0.48% (2) from two or more races. Hispanic or Latino of any race were 3.59% (15) of the population.

Of the 162 households, 30.9% had children under the age of 18; 58.0% were married couples living together; 8.6% had a female householder with no husband present and 27.2% were non-families. Of all households, 22.2% were made up of individuals and 11.7% had someone living alone who was 65 years of age or older. The average household size was 2.58 and the average family size was 3.03.

23.7% of the population were under the age of 18, 5.0% from 18 to 24, 25.8% from 25 to 44, 29.4% from 45 to 64, and 16.0% who were 65 years of age or older. The median age was 42.8 years. For every 100 females, the population had 94.4 males. For every 100 females ages 18 and older there were 86.5 males.

The Census Bureau's 2006–2010 American Community Survey showed that (in 2010 inflation-adjusted dollars) median household income was $97,500 (with a margin of error of +/− $18,039) and the median family income was $102,708 (+/− $20,734). Males had a median income of $73,250 (+/− $8,715) versus $50,625 (+/− $15,872) for females. The per capita income for the borough was $37,678 (+/− $5,017). About none of families and 0.5% of the population were below the poverty line, including none of those under age 18 and 3.0% of those age 65 or over.

=== 2000 census ===
As of the 2000 United States census there were 410 people, 169 households, and 126 families residing in the borough. The population density was 547.1 inhabitants per square mile (211.2/km^{2}). There were 173 housing units at an average density of 230.9 per square mile (89.2/km^{2}). The racial makeup of the borough was 97.56% White, 0.98% African American, 0.98% Asian, and 0.49% from two or more races. Hispanic or Latino of any race were 3.17% of the population.

There were 169 households, out of which 25.4% had children under the age of 18 living with them, 59.8% were married couples living together, 9.5% had a female householder with no husband present, and 24.9% were non-families. 18.9% of all households were made up of individuals, and 8.9% had someone living alone who was 65 years of age or older. The average household size was 2.43 and the average family size was 2.79.

In the borough the population was spread out, with 19.3% under the age of 18, 4.1% from 18 to 24, 25.4% from 25 to 44, 34.1% from 45 to 64, and 17.1% who were 65 years of age or older. The median age was 46 years. For every 100 females, there were 99.0 males. For every 100 females age 18 and over, there were 91.3 males.

The median income for a household in the borough was $76,353, and the median income for a family was $83,118. Males had a median income of $60,156 versus $36,406 for females. The per capita income for the borough was $30,694. About 3.1% of families and 4.6% of the population were below the poverty line, including 6.4% of those under age 18 and 7.3% of those age 65 or over.

== Government ==
=== Local government ===
Millstone is governed under the borough form of New Jersey municipal government, which is used in 218 municipalities (of the 564) statewide, making it the most common form of government in New Jersey. The governing body is comprised of the mayor and the borough council, with all positions elected at-large on a partisan basis as part of the November general election. The mayor is elected directly by the voters to a four-year term of office. The borough council includes six members elected to serve three-year terms on a staggered basis, with two seats coming up for election each year in a three-year cycle. The borough form of government used by Millstone is a "weak mayor / strong council" government in which council members act as the legislative body with the mayor presiding at meetings and voting only in the event of a tie. The mayor can veto ordinances subject to an override by a two-thirds majority vote of the council. The mayor makes committee and liaison assignments for council members, and most appointments are made by the mayor with the advice and consent of the council.

As of 2022, the mayor of Millstone Borough is Democrat Raymond Heck, whose term of office ends December 31, 2022. Members of the Millstone Borough Council are Council President Mandy Coppola (D, 2022), Robert Galli (I, 2024), Alan Kidd (R, 2023), Karin Kidd (2023), Kristen Ross (R, 2022) and Johnathan Stashek (D, 2024).

In January 2019, the borough council selected Vincent Biviano from three candidates nominated by the Republican municipal committee to fill the seat expiring in December 2021 that had been won, but never filled, by Merry Emmich.

=== Federal, state, and county representation ===
Millstone is located in the 12th Congressional District and is part of New Jersey's 16th state legislative district

Prior to the 2010 Census, Millstone had been part of the 4th Congressional District, a change made by the New Jersey Redistricting Commission that took effect in January 2013, based on the results of the November 2012 general elections.

For the 119th United States Congress, New Jersey's 12th congressional district is represented by Bonnie Watson Coleman (D, Ewing Township). New Jersey is represented in the United States Senate by Democrats Cory Booker (Newark, term ends 2027) and Andy Kim (Moorestown, term ends 2031).

For the 2026–2027 session, the 16th legislative district of the New Jersey Legislature is represented in the New Jersey Senate by Andrew Zwicker (D, South Brunswick) and in the General Assembly by Mitchelle Drulis (D, East Amwell Township) and Roy Freiman (D, Hillsborough Township).

Somerset County is governed by a five-member Board of County Commissioners, whose members are elected at-large to three-year terms of office on a staggered basis, with one or two seats coming up for election each year. At an annual reorganization meeting held in the first week of January, the board selects a Director and deputy director from among its members. As of 2025, Somerset County's County Commissioners are Director Shanel Robinson (D, Franklin Township, term as commissioner ends 2027; term as director ends 2026), Deputy Director Paul Drake (D, Hillsborough Township, term as commissioner and as deputy director ends 2026), Melonie Marano (D, Green Brook Township, 2028), Elizabeth Graner (D, Bernards Township, 2026; elected to serve an unexpired term) and Sara Sooy (D, Bedminster Township, 2027).

Constitutional officers, elected on a countywide basis are Clerk Steve Peter (D, Somerville, 2027), Sheriff Darrin Russo (D, Franklin Township, 2028) and Surrogate Bernice "Tina" Jalloh (D, Franklin Township, 2030).

=== Politics ===
As of March 23, 2011, there were a total of 309 registered voters in Millstone, of which 107 (34.6% vs. 26.0% countywide) were registered as Democrats, 85 (27.5% vs. 25.7%) were registered as Republicans and 117 (37.9% vs. 48.2%) were registered as Unaffiliated. There were no voters registered to other parties. Among the borough's 2010 Census population, 73.9% (vs. 60.4% in Somerset County) were registered to vote, including 96.9% of those ages 18 and over (vs. 80.4% countywide).

United States presidential election results for Millstone
Year	Republican		Democratic		Third party(ies)	
Year	No.	%	No.	%	No.	%
2024	141	48.12%	148	50.51%	4	1.37%
2020	153	49.68%	151	49.03%	4	1.30%
2016	133	53.85%	107	43.32%	7	2.83%
2012	119	49.79%	118	49.37%	2	0.84%
2008	143	57.43%	104	41.77%	2	0.80%
2004	130	50.98%	123	48.24%	2	0.78%
2000	103	46.40%	103	46.40%	16	7.21%

In the 2012 presidential election, Republican Mitt Romney received 49.8% of the vote (119 cast), ahead of Democrat Barack Obama with 49.4% (118 votes), and other candidates with 0.8% (2 votes), among the 240 ballots cast by the borough's 325 registered voters (1 ballot was spoiled), for a turnout of 73.8%. In the 2008 presidential election, Republican John McCain received 143 votes (57.0% vs. 46.1% countywide), ahead of Democrat Barack Obama with 104 votes (41.4% vs. 52.1%) and other candidates with 2 votes (0.8% vs. 1.1%), among the 251 ballots cast by the borough's 309 registered voters, for a turnout of 81.2% (vs. 78.7% in Somerset County). In the 2004 presidential election, Republican George W. Bush received 130 votes (50.6% vs. 51.5% countywide), ahead of Democrat John Kerry with 123 votes (47.9% vs. 47.2%) and other candidates with 2 votes (0.8% vs. 0.9%), among the 257 ballots cast by the borough's 304 registered voters, for a turnout of 84.5% (vs. 81.7% in the whole county).

Gubernatorial election results for Millstone
Year	Republican		Democratic		Third party(ies)	
Year	No.	%	No.	%	No.	%
2025	112	46.09%	131	53.91%	0	0.00%
2021	120	49.79%	98	40.66%	23	9.54%
2017	90	51.14%	74	42.05%	12	6.82%
2013	97	61.01%	56	35.22%	6	3.77%
2009	100	55.25%	62	34.25%	19	10.50%
2005	104	51.23%	89	43.84%	10	4.93%

In the 2013 gubernatorial election, Republican Chris Christie received 61.0% of the vote (97 cast), ahead of Democrat Barbara Buono with 35.2% (56 votes), and other candidates with 3.8% (6 votes), among the 159 ballots cast by the borough's 320 registered voters for a turnout of 49.7%. In the 2009 gubernatorial election, Republican Chris Christie received 100 votes (54.6% vs. 55.8% countywide), ahead of Democrat Jon Corzine with 62 votes (33.9% vs. 34.1%), Independent Chris Daggett with 18 votes (9.8% vs. 8.7%) and other candidates with 1 votes (0.5% vs. 0.7%), among the 183 ballots cast by the borough's 303 registered voters, yielding a 60.4% turnout (vs. 52.5% in the county).

United States Senate election results for Millstone1
Year	Republican		Democratic		Third party(ies)	
Year	No.	%	No.	%	No.	%
2024	132	47.14%	142	50.71%	6	2.14%
2018	127	55.22%	93	40.43%	10	4.35%
2012	115	50.22%	109	47.60%	5	2.18%
2006	93	48.44%	90	46.88%	9	4.69%

United States Senate election results for Millstone2
Year	Republican		Democratic		Third party(ies)	
Year	No.	%	No.	%	No.	%
2020	149	49.67%	144	48.00%	7	2.33%
2014	70	53.03%	55	41.67%	7	5.30%
2013	67	57.76%	48	41.38%	1	0.86%
2008	130	55.79%	97	41.63%	6	2.58%

== Education ==
Several classical schools operated in the Millstone area. Queens College was relocated to Millstone in 1780 during the war. In 1814, a two-story building called the Academy was established as a co-ed public school on the lot owned by Daniel Disborough. In 1860, the school was relocated to a newly constructed building later to be known as the Millstone Borough Schoolhouse, which then operated until 1940, after which it was known as Millstone Borough Hall. Another classical school focusing on Latin started in 1826 at the home of Dominie Zabriskie. Joseph P. Bradley, who would later become a U.S. Supreme Court Justice, also taught at a classical school in Millstone after graduating at Rutgers in 1836 and before attending law school where he was barred in 1839.

There are no public schools currently operating in Millstone Borough; students attend public school in the Hillsborough Township School District, in Hillsborough Township as part of a sending/receiving relationship. As of the 2018–2019 school year, the district, comprised of nine schools, had an enrollment of 7,457 students and 645.4 classroom teachers (on an FTE basis), for a student–teacher ratio of 11.6:1.

== Transportation ==
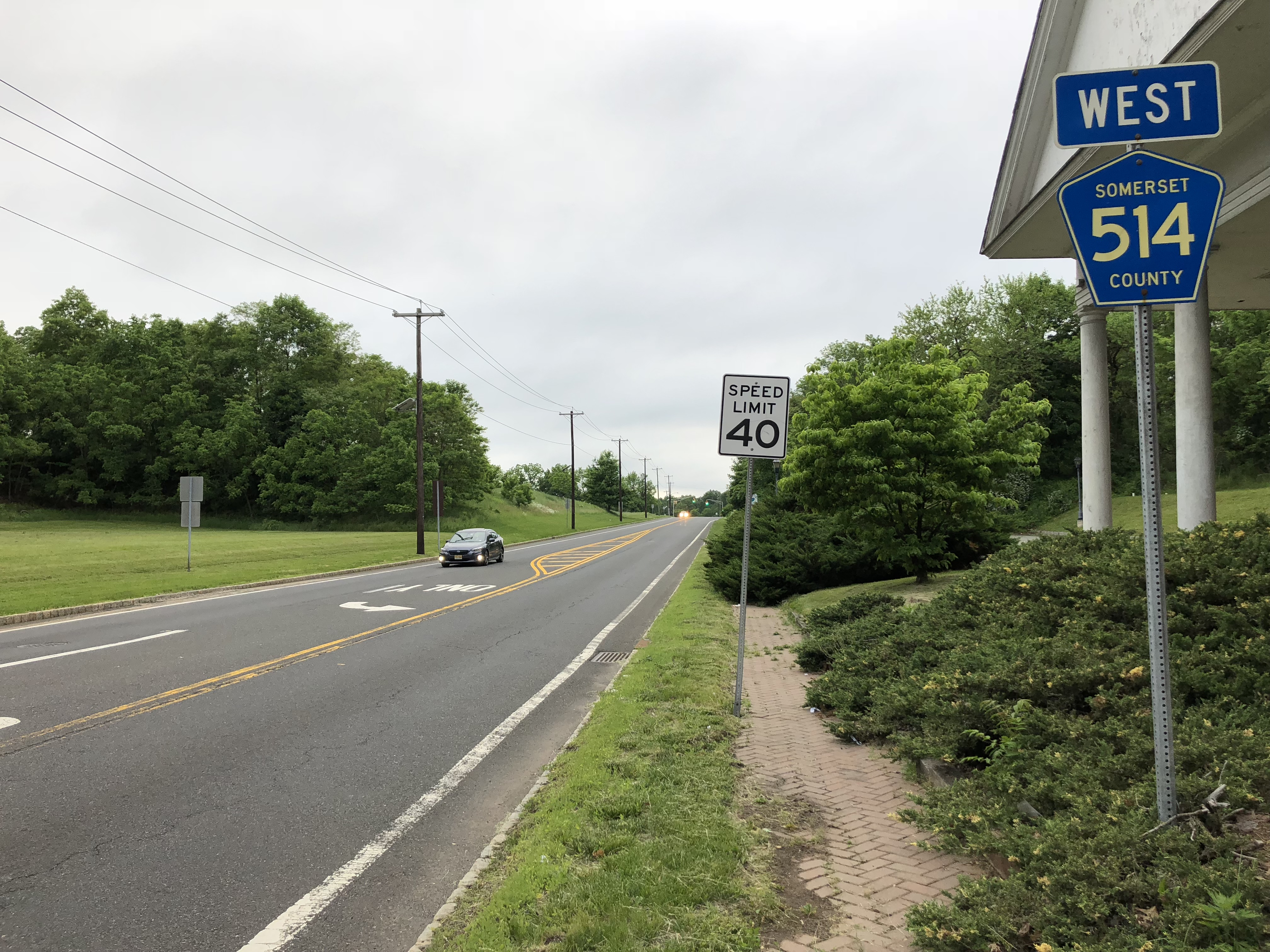
CR 514 in Millstone

As of May 2010, the borough had a total of 4.41 miles (7.10 km) of roadways, of which 4.01 miles (6.45 km) were maintained by the municipality and 0.40 miles (0.64 km) by Somerset County.

No Interstate, U.S. or state highways directly serve Millstone. The most prominent roads in the borough are County Route 514 and County Route 533.

== Notable people ==
People who were born in, residents of, or otherwise closely associated with Millstone include:

- Frederick Theodore Frelinghuysen (1817–1885), United States Senator representing New Jersey and a United States Secretary of State under Chester A. Arthur
- Ferdinand Schureman Schenck (1790–1860), represented New Jersey in the United States House of Representatives from 1833 to 1837
- Charles Titus (1838–1921), Union Army soldier who was awarded a Medal of Honor for his actions in the Civil War

== See also ==
- Millstone Historic District
- Battle of Millstone (Battle of Van Nest's Mill)
