= Congressional Silver Medal =

Award bestowed by the United States Congress

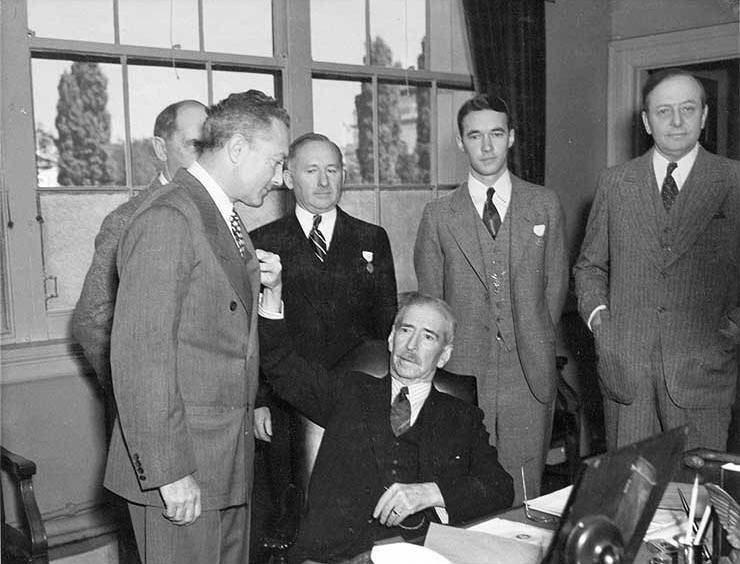
Secretary of the Navy Claude A. Swanson presenting the Second Byrd Antarctic Expedition Medal to Rear Admiral Richard E. Byrd, 15 October 1937

A Congressional Silver Medal is an award bestowed by the United States Congress. They have been made in either non-portable (not designed to be worn) or decoration (designed to be worn) form.

Congress has been authorizing gold medals since George Washington received the first one in 1776. Occasionally Congress will authorize a silver medal in conjunction with the higher award.

In 1779, when Brigadier General Anthony Wayne was awarded a gold medal, Lieutenant Colonel François de Fleury and Major John Stewart were awarded silver medals.

In 1780, Congress directed that silver medals be struck for John Paulding, David Williams, and Isaac Van Wart for capturing a British spy. There are no gold medals associated with this award.

In 1781, when Brigadier General Daniel Morgan was awarded a gold medal, Lieutenant Colonel William Washington and Lieutenant-Colonel John Eager Howard were awarded silver medals.

During the War of 1812, if a ship's captain was awarded a gold medal, sometimes his officers would receive silver duplicates.

In 1890, Congress directed that suitable medals be struck in commemoration of the Jeannette Expedition. 8 gold and 25 silver medals were struck.

In 1900, Congress directed that a gold medal be made for First Lieutenant Frank H. Newcomb, U.S. Revenue Cutter Service and to each of his officers a silver medal, and to each member of his crew a bronze medal. (31 Stat. 716)

In 1914, Congress directed that gold medals be made for steamship captain Paul H. Kreibohm and four additional officers, with silver and bronze medals awarded to other members of his crew. (38 Stat. 769).

In 1930, Congress directed that gold, silver, and bronze medals be made for the officers and men of the Byrd Antarctic expedition.

In 1936, Congress directed that silver medals be made for the deserving personnel of the Second Byrd Antarctic Expedition that spent the winter night at Little America or who commanded either one of the expedition ships throughout the expedition. (Public Law 74-98, 49 Stat. 1395). There were no gold medals associated with this award.

In 1945, Congress directed that gold, silver, and bronze medals be made for the members of the United States Antarctic Expedition of 1939-1941 (Public Law 79-185, 59 Stat. 536).

In 2001, Congress awarded the Congressional Gold Medal to the original twenty-nine World War II Navajo code talkers, and silver medals to each person who qualified as a Navajo code talker (approximately 300). When Congress went further, to award gold medals to all Native American tribes that had code talkers, it authorized duplicate silver medals for each individual, while the gold medal representing the tribe would be retained by the Smithsonian.

Congress may also authorize the United States Mint to strike commemorative silver medals, such as the 2011 (to mark 10th anniversary) September 11 National Medal.

== Special Congressional Silver Medal ==
In 1976, President Gerald Ford presented, on behalf of Congress, a silver medal "equivalent to a noncombat Medal of Honor" to Brigadier General Charles "Chuck" Yeager, "for contributing immeasurably to aerospace science by risking his life in piloting the XS-1 research airplane faster than the speed of sound on October 14, 1947." This apparently unique award—equivalent to a noncombat Medal of Honor—is sometimes referred to as a Special Congressional Silver Medal.

== See also ==
- Awards and decorations of the United States government
