= Patriots Park (Westchester) =

Park in Westchester County, New York

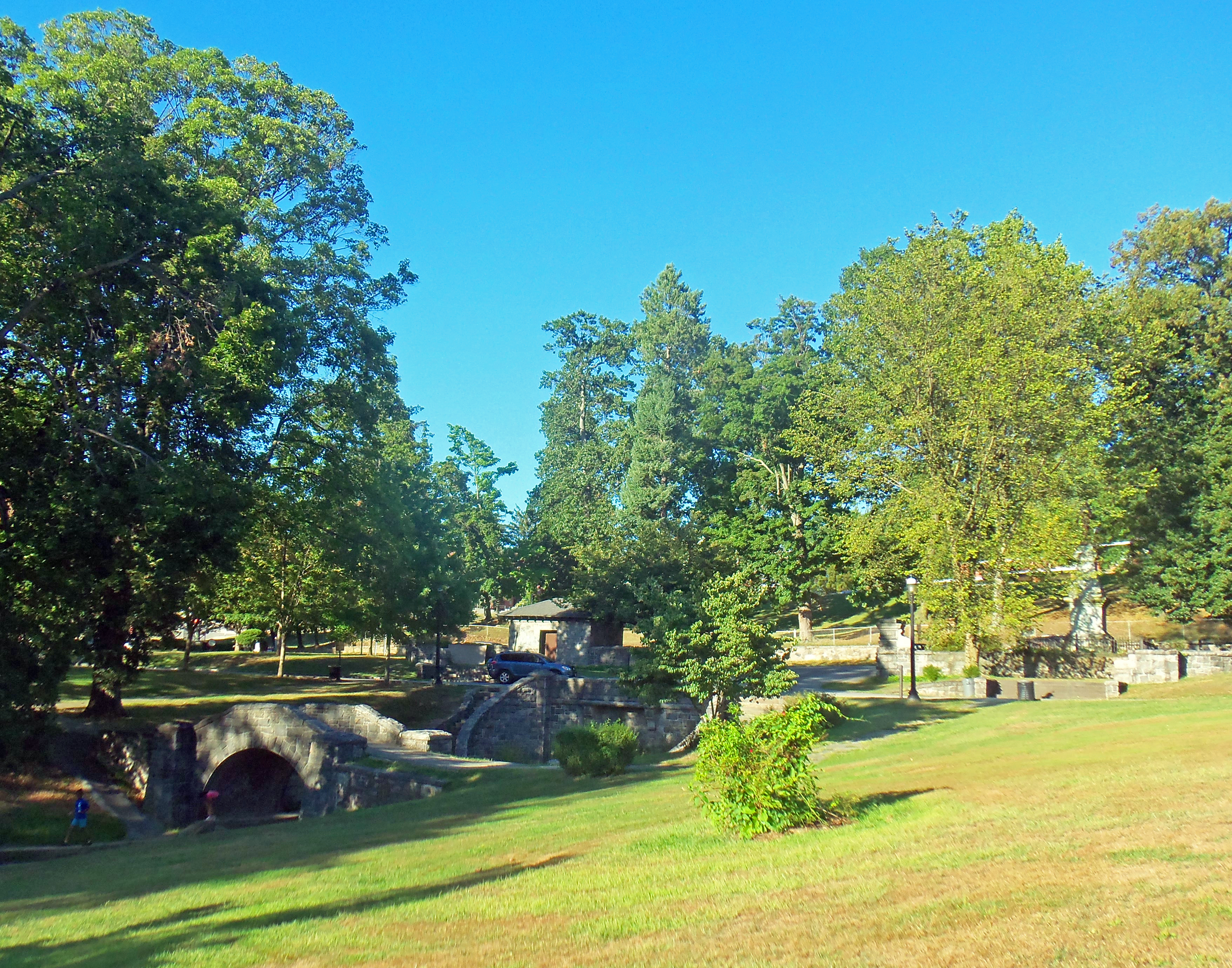
- Decorative features of park, including Captors' Monument at right, 2012

- Location within New York
- Type: Public
- Location: Sleepy Hollow and Tarrytown, New York, US
- Nearest city: White Plains
- Coordinates: 41°04′54″N 73°51′31″W
- Area: 4 acres (1.6 ha)
- Created: 1853
- Operator: Villages of Sleepy Hollow and Tarrytown
- Patriot's Park
- U.S. National Register of Historic Places
- Architect: Carrère & Hastings
- NRHP reference No.: 82003415
- Added to NRHP: June 14, 1982

Patriots Park (originally referred to as Brookside Park) is located on U.S. Route 9 along the boundary between Tarrytown and Sleepy Hollow in Westchester County, New York, United States. It is a four-acre (1.6-ha) parcel with a walkway and several monuments. In 1982, it was added to the National Register of Historic Places.

== Overview ==
During the American Revolutionary War Major John André of the British Army was captured, disguised in civilian clothing, at the site by three Patriot militiamen. They found papers on him that implicated him in espionage with Benedict Arnold, a high-ranking officer of the Continental Army. After a military trial André was executed; Arnold defected to the British and lived his remaining years after the war in England.

A memorial was erected on the site in 1853, on land donated by William and Mary Taylor, members of the local African American community. It was one of the earliest monuments to honor any event of the Revolutionary War. Later it was expanded and incorporated into Brookside Park, a late 19th-century Beaux-Arts residential development by the firm of Carrère and Hastings. Later it became the campus of two different girls' boarding schools, one of which was attended by Lauren Bacall. It became a park and took its current name in the early 20th century, and all buildings but the gatehouse were demolished.

== Grounds ==
The park is a four-acre (1.6 ha) parcel located between North Broadway (Route 9) on its east, North Washington Street to the west and College Avenue on the north. The southwest corner has some houses continuing down to Wildey Street; Tarrytown's public library is to the southeast. Across North Washington are more houses, which continue to the College intersection at the northwest. Church of the Immaculate Conception is across from the park at College and North Broadway. To the east is the large open lawn of John Paulding School, the public elementary school of the Union Free School District of the Tarrytowns, which has its headquarters north of the school in the former Edward Harden Mansion, also listed on the National Register. Behind them runs the Old Croton Aqueduct, a National Historic Landmark. The commercial areas of downtown Sleepy Hollow are two blocks to the north along North Broadway.

Topographically the park consists of two slight rises, more pronounced toward the west, reflecting the land's general descent toward the nearby Hudson River. They are divided by the narrow channel followed by Andre Brook, (Note: The common and official local spelling for the stream in Tarrytown and Sleepy Hollow is "Andre Brook" (without the accent).) which also forms the boundary between the two villages, Tarrytown to the south and Sleepy Hollow to the north. The land is mostly open, with tall mature trees providing shade opportunities, more in the north of the park than the south.

The park's organizing feature is an oval walkway with entrances at the north, east and west, and short paths to a basketball court at the south and North Broadway to the southeast. The main entrance is at the west. It is flanked by two gateposts of rusticated granite blocks. Stone walls in random ashlar with granite copings begin at the posts and follow the sidewalks to create terraces, broken by granite steps to the walkway, on either side of the entrance. They end in granite consoles.

In the north terraces is a stone gatehouse, one bay on each side with walls laid in a random ashlar pattern and topped by a cornice line. Atop is a hipped roof shingled in asphalt, with exposed rafter ends. Its entrance is on the west facade; the only window is on the north.

South of the west entrance is the Captors' Monument, enclosed by a square iron fence. It consists of two pedestals topped by a bronze statue of John Paulding, one of the local militiamen who apprehended André. The older lower pedestal is a square block of white Sing Sing marble with a recessed panel on the west side. Inside the panel is a bronze commemorative plaque with a bas-relief depicting André's capture. It supports the upper pedestal, a narrowing concrete block, and the statue of Paulding atop that. South of the Captors' Monument is a more modern statue of Christopher Columbus.

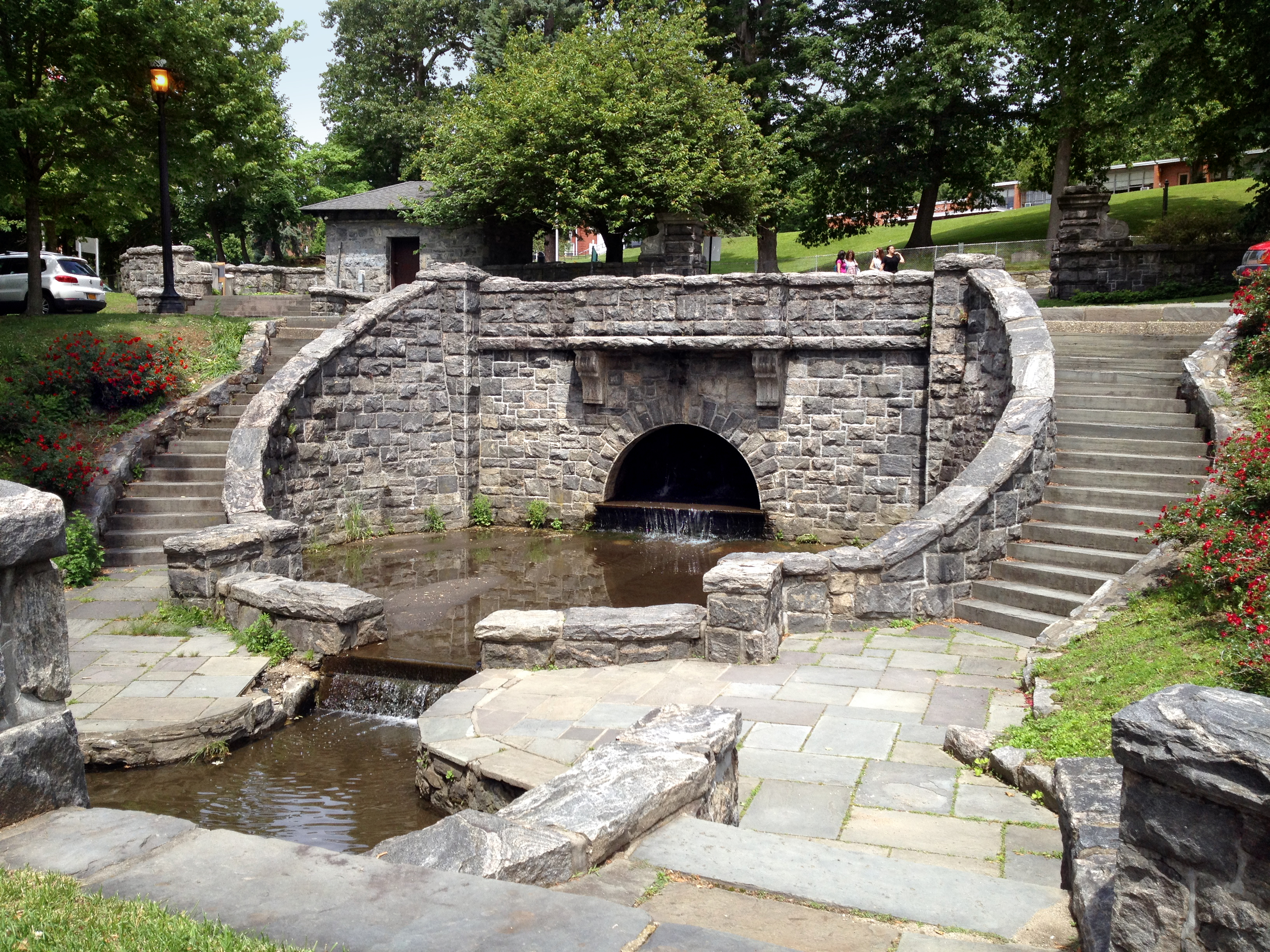
Uppermost of the three stone bridges in the park

Opposite the entrance curving stone steps, along with a sloped walkway from the south, lead down from battered stone piers at either end of a retaining wall to a basin where Andre Brook flows out from a culvert that has carried it under North Broadway and the schools to the east. It emerges from an arch with alternating scaled voussoirs and a scaled keystone in the monochrome ashlar retaining wall on the west side of the walkway. Above it is a balcony supported by two consoles. (The elaborate stonework is a remnant of the 1890s Brookside Park residential development, designed by Carrère and Hastings.)

The brook flows over a dam and west down a concrete-lined channel, paralleled by a stone path on the south bank. Midway along it is a small stone foot bridge, with battered stone piers and an arch, with the same voussoirs as the retaining wall arch but a shouldered keystone. From there it flows over another waterfall and under the drive bridge, similar to the foot bridge but heavier, then into another culvert under North Washington Avenue.

There are two playgrounds within the park. A smaller, older one is in the northwest corner, and a newer and larger one in the southwest, near the library. Decorative lamps line the drive, and benches are located around the park.

== History ==
The park derives its primary importance from the capture of Major André during the war. The monument was erected in the mid-19th century. After being developed for residential use in the late 19th century, it became home to two girls' schools and finally, today's park, undergoing several renovations in the process.

=== 1780: Capture of Major André ===
In 1780, five years from the start of the Revolutionary War, the settlements that would later become the Tarrytowns were in the middle of the Neutral Ground, a no-man's land between British forces occupying New York City and the Continental Army north of the Croton River. Mounted partisan units roamed the lightly populated area, raiding farms in a search for livestock and other goods they could sell to the warring armies. Two Loyalist factions, Skinner's Greens and De Lancey's Cow-boys, were engaged in cattle theft and looting. Bands of irregular cavalry provisioning American troops also operated in the Neutral Ground.

On the morning of September 24 that year, three young men—John Paulding, Isaac Van Wart, and David Williams—set themselves up along the Albany Post Road running through Tarrytown, approximately 200 yards (180 m) east of where the Captors' Monument is now. They were part of a group of eight local militiamen patrolling the area. A rider approached them, and they raised their guns to stop him. It was Major John André of the British Army, returning from a clandestine visit to West Point, where he had been negotiating the terms of a surrender with General Benedict Arnold of the Continental Army.

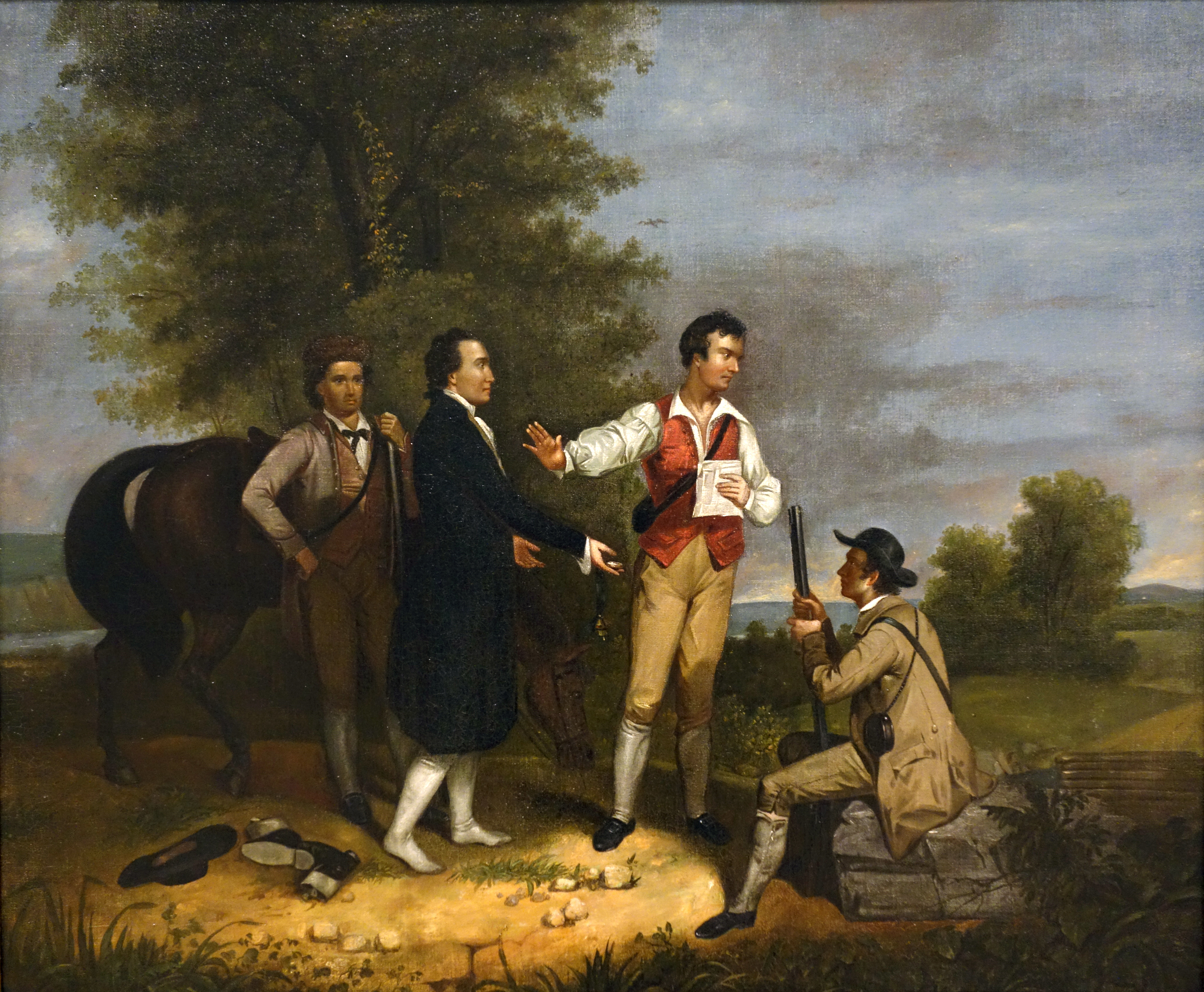
1833 painting of André's capture

Paulding, who had recently escaped from British custody, wore a Hessian coat he had taken in the process, which led André to assume, in the ensuing conversation, that the three were Cow-boys who could thus aid him in continuing on to New York. When informed of his mistake, he produced a pass signed by Arnold. The three searched him and found papers in his boots, not only his correspondence with Arnold but diagrams of the defenses at West Point. Paulding, the only literate member of the trio, read them and realized quickly that André was a spy. Williams asked André what money he could pay them, but Paulding quickly ended any talk of a payoff, swearing that not even 10,000 guineas would be enough.

After André was turned over to the Continental command at North Castle, he was taken across the Hudson to Tappan where he was held prisoner in The '76 House tavern. After being convicted of espionage at a military trial in the Reformed Church Of Tappan (today a National Historic Landmark), he was hanged by order of George Washington, who had attended the trial. Had André successfully conveyed the information Arnold had given him to New York, the British could have managed to secure the Hudson and cut New England off from the other rebellious colonies, resolving the stalemate of the time in their favor and drastically changing the outcome of the war.

Arnold, tipped off about André's arrest by a member of his staff unaware of his commander's involvement, was able to escape to the British with his family. After holding some commands in the British Army, he emigrated to England at war's end, where he was buried two decades later. Paulding, Van Wart and Williams were recognized and compensated for their roles in the capture. The Continental Congress awarded them lifetime pensions and the Fidelity Medallion, generally considered the first U.S. military decoration; the state gave them farms confiscated from Loyalists. Two decades later, three counties in the new state of Ohio were named after them. Later the elementary school near the memorial would take Paulding's name as well.

=== 1853–1942: homes and schools ===
David Williams, the last survivor of the trio that captured Major John Andre, died in 1831. After his death, a movement began to build a monument at the capture site. It never gained enough support, but never completely disappeared either. In 1852 the Monument Association to the Captors of Major André was formally established at last, and it was able to bring those plans to fruition. A local freed African American couple, William and Mary Taylor, donated the property they owned at the intersection of the brook and the highway. The cornerstone was laid on Independence Day, July 4, 1853. Among those at the ceremony were Alexander Hamilton's son James, and Horatio Seymour and Henry J. Raymond, governor and lieutenant governor of New York, respectively. The lower pedestal was raised shortly thereafter, of marble quarried in nearby Sing Sing, today Ossining. It was topped with an obelisk.

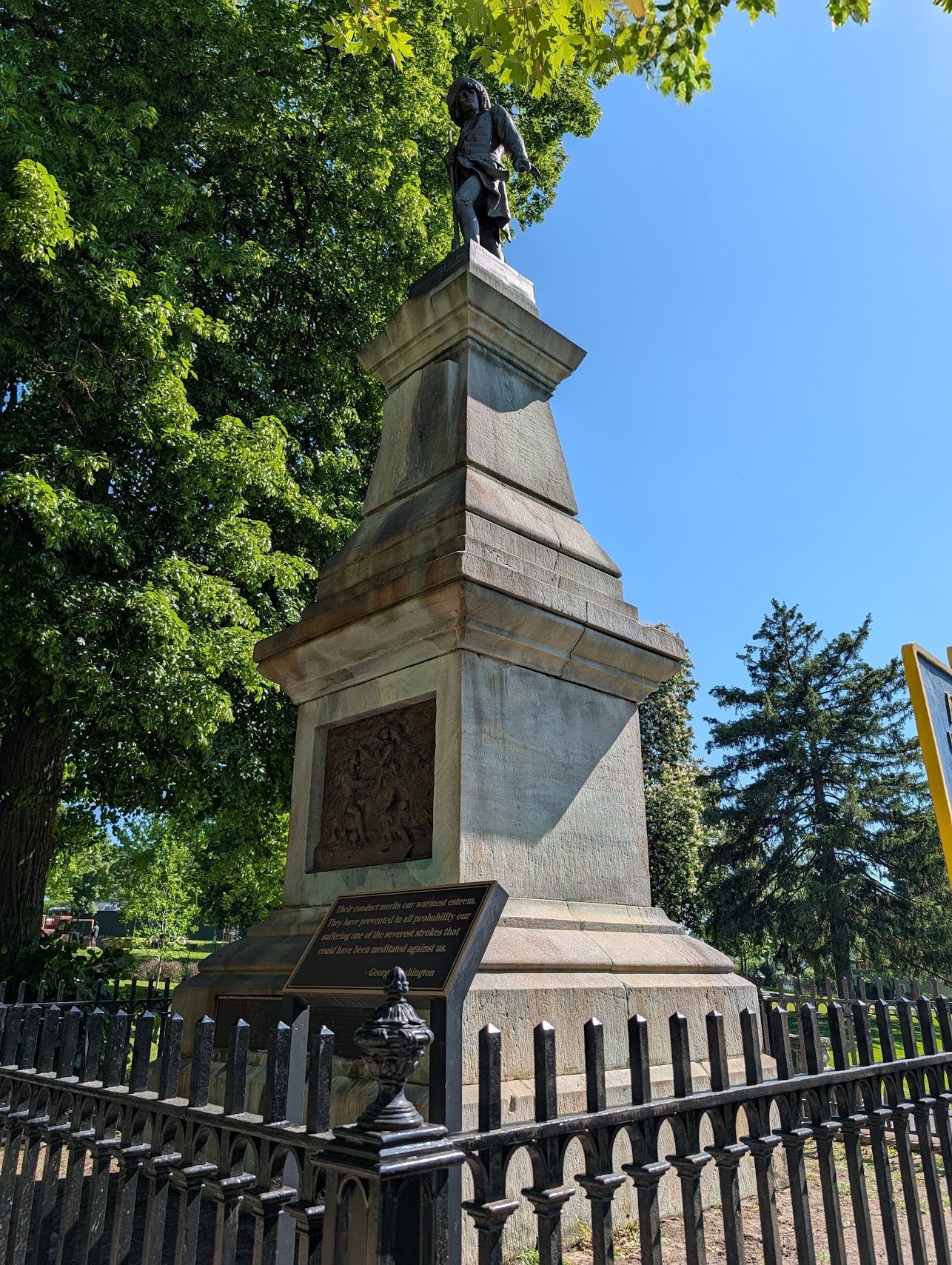
Captors Monument, 2026

On the centennial of the capture in 1880, the monument was expanded and rededicated. A crowd of 70,000 attended the ceremony, presided over by Samuel J. Tilden (one of his last public appearances) and Chauncey Depew. The obelisk was replaced with the current concrete block and topped with a statue of Paulding by William R. O'Donovan, donated by a Tarrytown resident.

At that time there were three houses across North Broadway, dating to at least 1865. They were demolished to clear the way for an 1892 plan to incorporate the monument into Brookside Park, a new residential development. Carrère and Hastings designed eight wood and stone Beaux-Arts cottages and a stone gatehouse, meant to blend in with the site, and laid out the park's extant landscaping, its symmetry and grandiose treatment of the basin characteristic of their chosen style. By the end of the year all were completed, at a cost of $10,000 ($311,000 in 2024) apiece. Developer Eugene Jones intended to lease the units individually rather than sell them.

In 1896 he sold them to Amos Clark, who continued to lease out the cottages until renting the property to the recently established Knox School for Girls in 1911. It named the buildings, which housed its 42 students, after roses. By the end of the decade Knox had outgrown Brookside, and moved to a new campus in Cooperstown. In 1920 another girls' school, Highland Manor, moved in.

Among the students to attend Highland Manor was Lauren Bacall, later a successful actress. In 1942, as its predecessor had, the school moved to a larger campus elsewhere. Two local women bought the park, had all but one of the neglected cottages demolished, and then donated the property to the two villages. At that time it was renamed to Patriot's Park.

=== 1943–present: park ===
After World War II ended, three local garden clubs formed a committee to guide the restoration of the park. Following a plan by a still-unidentified architect, the foundations of the demolished houses were filled in and planted in 1949. Over the next six years further improvements were made. New paved paths were created, dead trees replaced with younger dogwoods and the brook channel lined with concrete. All the masonry was reset and repointed.

The remaining house from Brookside Park was used as a gymnasium and storage area until it was demolished around 1970. The gatehouse is the only building left from that development. As of 1982 the villages of Tarrytown and North Tarrytown (as Sleepy Hollow was known until changing its name in the early 1990s) both allocated a thousand dollars a year to the park's maintenance.

In 2026, local Boy Scout Evan Bloom of Troop 22, Tarrytown, restored and beautified the Captors Monument as part of his Eagle Scout Project.

== See also ==
- National Register of Historic Places listings in northern Westchester County, New York
