= List of counties in Ohio =

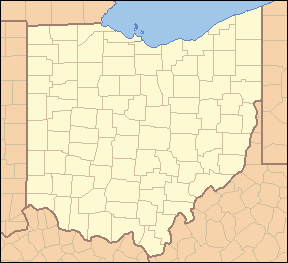

There are 88 counties in the U.S. state of Ohio. Nine of them existed at the time of the Ohio Constitutional Convention in 1802. A tenth county, Wayne, was established on August 15, 1796, and encompassed roughly the present state of Michigan. During the Convention, the county was opposed to statehood, and was not only left out of the Convention, but dissolved; the current Wayne County is in northeastern Ohio, considerably distant from the area that was the original Wayne County.

The Ohio Constitution allows counties to set up a charter government as many cities and villages do, but only Summit and Cuyahoga counties have done so, the latter having been approved by voters in November 2009. Counties do not possess home rule powers and can do only what has been expressly authorized by the Ohio General Assembly. The elected county officials in Ohio county governments include three commissioners, a sheriff (the highest law enforcement officer in the county); prosecutor (equivalent of a district attorney in other states); coroner, engineer, Recorder, auditor, treasurer, and clerk of courts.

Population figures are based on the 2025 vintage Census population estimates. The population of Ohio was 11,900,510 at that time, an increase of 0.9% from 2020. The average population of Ohio's counties was 135,233; Franklin County was the most populous (1,361,536) and Vinton County was the least (12,645). The average land area is 464 sq mi (1,200 km^{2}). The largest county by area is Ashtabula County at 702.44 sq mi (1,819.3 km^{2}), and its neighbor, Lake County, is the smallest at 228.21 sq mi (591.1 km^{2}). The total area of the state is 40,860.69 sq mi (105,828.7 km^{2}).

== List of counties ==
County	FIPS code	County Seat	Est.	Origin	Etymology	Population (2025)	Area	Map
Adams County	001	West Union	Jul 10, 1797	Hamilton County	John Adams (1735–1826), President of the United States when the county was organized	27,865	583.91 sq mi (1,512 km^{2})	State map highlighting Adams County
Allen County	003	Lima	Apr 1, 1820	Shelby County	John Allen (1771/2-1813), a War of 1812 colonel	100,881	404.43 sq mi (1,047 km^{2})	State map highlighting Allen County
Ashland County	005	Ashland	Feb 24, 1846	Wayne, Richland, Huron, and Lorain Counties	Ashland, home of U.S. Senator from Kentucky Henry Clay	52,523	424.37 sq mi (1,099 km^{2})	State map highlighting Ashland County
Ashtabula County	007	Jefferson	Jun 7, 1808	Trumbull and Geauga Counties	Ashtabula River, which means "fish river" in an Algonquian language	96,713	702.44 sq mi (1,819 km^{2})	State map highlighting Ashtabula County
Athens County	009	Athens	Mar 1, 1805	Washington County	Athens in Greece	63,197	506.76 sq mi (1,313 km^{2})	State map highlighting Athens County
Auglaize County	011	Wapakoneta	Mar 1, 1848	Allen, Mercer, Darke, Hardin, Logan, Shelby, and Van Wert Counties	Auglaize River, which means "fallen timbers river" in the Shawnee Indian language	45,909	401.25 sq mi (1,039 km^{2})	State map highlighting Auglaize County
Belmont County	013	St. Clairsville	Sep 7, 1801	Jefferson and Washington Counties	French for "beautiful mountain"	64,434	537.35 sq mi (1,392 km^{2})	State map highlighting Belmont County
Brown County	015	Georgetown	Mar 1, 1818	Adams and Clermont Counties	General Jacob Brown (1775–1828), an officer of the War of 1812	44,397	491.76 sq mi (1,274 km^{2})	State map highlighting Brown County
Butler County	017	Hamilton	May 1, 1803	Hamilton County	General Richard Butler (1743–1791), killed at the Battle of the Wabash	400,128	467.27 sq mi (1,210 km^{2})	State map highlighting Butler County
Carroll County	019	Carrollton	Jan 1, 1833	Columbiana, Stark, Harrison, Jefferson, and Tuscarawas Counties	Charles Carroll (1737–1832), last surviving signer of the United States Declaration of Independence	26,475	394.67 sq mi (1,022 km^{2})	State map highlighting Carroll County
Champaign County	021	Urbana	Mar 1, 1805	Greene and Franklin Counties	French for "a plain", describing the land in the area	38,820	428.56 sq mi (1,110 km^{2})	State map highlighting Champaign County
Clark County	023	Springfield	Mar 1, 1818	Champaign, Madison, and Greene Counties	General George Rogers Clark (1752–1818), defeated the Shawnee Indians in a battle near the Springfield area	135,340	399.86 sq mi (1,036 km^{2})	State map highlighting Clark County
Clermont County	025	Batavia	Dec 6, 1800	Hamilton County	French for "clear mountain"	216,977	451.99 sq mi (1,171 km^{2})	State map highlighting Clermont County
Clinton County	027	Wilmington	Mar 1, 1810	Highland and Warren Counties	George Clinton (1739–1812), vice president when the county was organized	42,301	410.88 sq mi (1,064 km^{2})	State map highlighting Clinton County
Columbiana County	029	Lisbon	May 1, 1803	Jefferson and Washington Counties	Christopher Columbus, European explorer of the Americas	99,377	532.46 sq mi (1,379 km^{2})	State map highlighting Columbiana County
Coshocton County	031	Coshocton	Mar 1, 1810	Muskingum and Tuscarawas Counties	Delaware Indian word meaning "union of waters"	37,188	564.07 sq mi (1,461 km^{2})	State map highlighting Coshocton County
Crawford County	033	Bucyrus	Apr 1, 1820	Delaware County	Colonel William Crawford (1732–1782), Revolutionary War officer	41,896	402.11 sq mi (1,041 km^{2})	State map highlighting Crawford County
Cuyahoga County	035	Cleveland	Jun 7, 1808	Geauga County	Cuyahoga River, which means "crooked river" in an Iroquoian language	1,232,925	458.49 sq mi (1,187 km^{2})	State map highlighting Cuyahoga County
Darke County	037	Greenville	Jan 3, 1809	Miami County	General William Darke (1736–1801), Revolutionary War officer	51,520	599.80 sq mi (1,553 km^{2})	State map highlighting Darke County
Defiance County	039	Defiance	Apr 7, 1845	Williams, Henry, and Paulding Counties	Fort Defiance, built in 1794 by General Anthony Wayne	38,292	411.16 sq mi (1,065 km^{2})	State map highlighting Defiance County
Delaware County	041	Delaware	Apr 1, 1808	Franklin County	Delaware Indians	242,032	442.41 sq mi (1,146 km^{2})	State map highlighting Delaware County
Erie County	043	Sandusky	Apr 1, 1838	Huron and Sandusky Counties	Erie Indians	73,296	254.88 sq mi (660 km^{2})	State map highlighting Erie County
Fairfield County	045	Lancaster	Dec 9, 1800	Ross and Washington Counties	Named for the beauty of its "fair fields"	169,752	505.11 sq mi (1,308 km^{2})	State map highlighting Fairfield County
Fayette County	047	Washington Court House	Mar 1, 1810	Ross and Highland Counties	Gilbert du Motier, marquis de La Fayette, French military officer and aristocrat who participated in both the American and French revolutions	28,552	406.58 sq mi (1,053 km^{2})	State map highlighting Fayette County
Franklin County	049	Columbus	Apr 30, 1803	Ross and Wayne Counties	Benjamin Franklin (1706–1791), Founding Father, author, printer, political theorist, scientist, inventor, and statesman	1,361,536	539.87 sq mi (1,398 km^{2})	State map highlighting Franklin County
Fulton County	051	Wauseon	Apr 1, 1850	Lucas, Henry, and Williams Counties	Robert Fulton (1765–1815), inventor of the steamboat	41,853	406.78 sq mi (1,054 km^{2})	State map highlighting Fulton County
Gallia County	053	Gallipolis	Apr 30, 1803	Washington and Adams Counties	Gaul, the ancient name of France	29,072	468.78 sq mi (1,214 km^{2})	State map highlighting Gallia County
Geauga County	055	Chardon	Mar 1, 1806	Trumbull County	A native american word meaning "raccoon"	95,676	403.66 sq mi (1,045 km^{2})	State map highlighting Geauga County
Greene County	057	Xenia	May 1, 1803	Hamilton and Ross Counties	General Nathanael Greene (1742–1786), Revolutionary War officer	174,322	414.88 sq mi (1,075 km^{2})	State map highlighting Greene County
Guernsey County	059	Cambridge	Mar 1, 1810	Belmont and Muskingum Counties	Island of Guernsey, from where most of the settlers originated	38,379	521.90 sq mi (1,352 km^{2})	State map highlighting Guernsey County
Hamilton County	061	Cincinnati	Jan 4, 1790	One of the original counties	Alexander Hamilton (1755/7-1804), Secretary of the Treasury when the county was organized	838,418	407.36 sq mi (1,055 km^{2})	State map highlighting Hamilton County
Hancock County	063	Findlay	Apr 1, 1820	Logan County	John Hancock (1737–1793), president of the Continental Congress	75,034	531.35 sq mi (1,376 km^{2})	State map highlighting Hancock County
Hardin County	065	Kenton	Apr 1, 1820	Logan County	General John Hardin (1753–1792), Revolutionary War officer	30,072	470.29 sq mi (1,218 km^{2})	State map highlighting Hardin County
Harrison County	067	Cadiz	Feb 1, 1813	Jefferson and Tuscarawas Counties	General William Henry Harrison (1773–1841), an officer of the War of 1812 and future President of the United States	14,070	403.53 sq mi (1,045 km^{2})	State map highlighting Harrison County
Henry County	069	Napoleon	Apr 1, 1820	Shelby County	Patrick Henry (1736–1799), Revolutionary War-era legislator, orator, and scholar	27,598	416.50 sq mi (1,079 km^{2})	State map highlighting Henry County
Highland County	071	Hillsboro	May 1, 1805	Ross, Adams, and Clermont Counties	Descriptive of the county's terrain	43,823	553.28 sq mi (1,433 km^{2})	State map highlighting Highland County
Hocking County	073	Logan	Mar 1, 1818	Athens, Ross, and Fairfield Counties	Possibly derived from the Delaware Indian word "Hoch-Hoch-ing", meaning "bottle"	27,512	422.75 sq mi (1,095 km^{2})	State map highlighting Hocking County
Holmes County	075	Millersburg	Jan 20, 1824	Coshocton, Wayne, and Tuscarawas Counties	Major Andrew Holmes (died 1814), a War of 1812 officer	44,970	422.99 sq mi (1,096 km^{2})	State map highlighting Holmes County
Huron County	077	Norwalk	Feb 7, 1809	Portage and Cuyahoga Counties	Huron Indians	58,250	492.69 sq mi (1,276 km^{2})	State map highlighting Huron County
Jackson County	079	Jackson	Mar 1, 1816	Scioto, Gallia, Athens, and Ross Counties	General Andrew Jackson (1767–1845), future President of the United States	32,817	420.28 sq mi (1,089 km^{2})	State map highlighting Jackson County
Jefferson County	081	Steubenville	Jul 29, 1797	Washington County	Thomas Jefferson (1743–1826), Vice President when the county was organized, future President of the United States, and principal author of the Declaration of Independence	63,597	409.61 sq mi (1,061 km^{2})	State map highlighting Jefferson County
Knox County	083	Mount Vernon	Mar 1, 1808	Fairfield County	General Henry Knox, the first Secretary of War	64,002	527.12 sq mi (1,365 km^{2})	State map highlighting Knox County
Lake County	085	Painesville	Mar 6, 1840	Geauga and Cuyahoga Counties	Its location on Lake Erie	232,217	228.21 sq mi (591 km^{2})	State map highlighting Lake County
Lawrence County	087	Ironton	Dec 21, 1815	Gallia and Scioto Counties	Captain James Lawrence (1781–1813), naval hero in the War of 1812	55,710	454.96 sq mi (1,178 km^{2})	State map highlighting Lawrence County
Licking County	089	Newark	Mar 1, 1808	Fairfield County	Licking River, named for the salt licks in the area, or an English pronunciation of the Lenape word W'li/'ik'/nk meaning "where the flood waters recede"	185,564	686.50 sq mi (1,778 km^{2})	State map highlighting Licking County
Logan County	091	Bellefontaine	Mar 1, 1818	Champaign County	General Benjamin Logan (c. 1742 – 1802), who destroyed Shawnee Indian towns in the county	46,302	458.44 sq mi (1,187 km^{2})	State map highlighting Logan County
Lorain County	093	Elyria	Dec 26, 1822	Huron, Cuyahoga, and Medina Counties	Province of Lorraine, France	323,219	492.50 sq mi (1,276 km^{2})	State map highlighting Lorain County
Lucas County	095	Toledo	Jun 20, 1835	Wood, Sandusky, and Huron Counties	Robert Lucas (1781–1853), Governor of Ohio when the county was created	423,347	340.46 sq mi (882 km^{2})	State map highlighting Lucas County
Madison County	097	London	Mar 1, 1810	Franklin County	James Madison (1751–1836), fourth President of the United States	46,985	465.44 sq mi (1,205 km^{2})	State map highlighting Madison County
Mahoning County	099	Youngstown	Mar 1, 1846	Columbiana and Trumbull Counties	Mahoning River, from a Lenape word meaning "at the licks"	224,706	415.25 sq mi (1,075 km^{2})	State map highlighting Mahoning County
Marion County	101	Marion	Apr 1, 1820	Delaware County	General Francis Marion (1732–1795), lieutenant colonel in the Continental Army and later brigadier general in the American Revolutionary War	65,115	403.84 sq mi (1,046 km^{2})	State map highlighting Marion County
Medina County	103	Medina	Feb 18, 1812	Portage County	Medina, world-renowned religious site in western Saudi Arabia	185,025	423 sq mi (1,096 km^{2})	State map highlighting Medina County
Meigs County	105	Pomeroy	Apr 1, 1819	Gallia and Athens Counties	Return Jonathan Meigs Jr. (1764–1825), Governor of Ohio and Postmaster General at the time the county was organized	21,587	429.42 sq mi (1,112 km^{2})	State map highlighting Meigs County
Mercer County	107	Celina	Apr 1, 1820	Darke County	General Hugh Mercer (1726–1777), a Revolutionary War officer	42,737	463.27 sq mi (1,200 km^{2})	State map highlighting Mercer County
Miami County	109	Troy	Apr 1, 1807	Montgomery County	Miami Indians	112,634	407.04 sq mi (1,054 km^{2})	State map highlighting Miami County
Monroe County	111	Woodsfield	Jan 29, 1813	Belmont, Washington, and Guernsey Counties	James Monroe (1758–1831), Secretary of State when the county was organized and future President of the United States	12,994	455.54 sq mi (1,180 km^{2})	State map highlighting Monroe County
Montgomery County	113	Dayton	May 1, 1803	Hamilton and Wayne Counties	General Richard Montgomery (1738–1775), a Revolutionary War officer	539,598	461.68 sq mi (1,196 km^{2})	State map highlighting Montgomery County
Morgan County	115	McConnelsville	Dec 29, 1817	Washington, Guernsey, and Muskingum Counties	General Daniel Morgan (c. 1735 – 1802), a Revolutionary War officer	13,626	417.66 sq mi (1,082 km^{2})	State map highlighting Morgan County
Morrow County	117	Mount Gilead	Mar 1, 1848	Knox, Marion, Delaware, and Richland Counties	Jeremiah Morrow (1771–1852), Governor of Ohio	36,305	406.22 sq mi (1,052 km^{2})	State map highlighting Morrow County
Muskingum County	119	Zanesville	March 1, 1804	Washington and Fairfield Counties	An Indian word meaning "A town by the river" or "by the river side"	87,014	664.63 sq mi (1,721 km^{2})	State map highlighting Muskingum County
Noble County	121	Caldwell	Apr 1, 1851	Monroe, Washington, Morgan, and Guernsey Counties	James Noble, an early settler in the area	14,276	399.00 sq mi (1,033 km^{2})	State map highlighting Noble County
Ottawa County	123	Port Clinton	Mar 6, 1840	Erie, Sandusky, and Lucas Counties	Named for the Ottawa Indians; Ottawa means "trader" in their language	39,481	254.95 sq mi (660 km^{2})	State map highlighting Ottawa County
Paulding County	125	Paulding	Apr 1, 1820	Darke County	John Paulding (1758–1818), captor of spy John André during the Revolutionary War	18,727	416.26 sq mi (1,078 km^{2})	State map highlighting Paulding County
Perry County	127	New Lexington	Mar 1, 1818	Washington, Fairfield, and Muskingum Counties	Commodore Oliver Hazard Perry (1785–1819), a naval officer of the War of 1812	35,918	409.78 sq mi (1,061 km^{2})	State map highlighting Perry County
Pickaway County	129	Circleville	Mar 1, 1810	Ross, Fairfield, and Franklin Counties	A misspelling of the Piqua tribe, a branch of the Shawnee	62,978	501.91 sq mi (1,300 km^{2})	State map highlighting Pickaway County
Pike County	131	Waverly	Feb 1, 1815	Ross, Scioto, and Adams Counties	General Zebulon M. Pike (1779–1813), a War of 1812 officer and discoverer of Pikes Peak in Colorado in 1806	27,061	441.49 sq mi (1,143 km^{2})	State map highlighting Pike County
Portage County	133	Ravenna	Jun 7, 1808	Trumbull County	Derived from an Indian portage	163,404	492.39 sq mi (1,275 km^{2})	State map highlighting Portage County
Preble County	135	Eaton	Mar 1, 1808	Montgomery and Butler Counties	Captain Edward Preble (1761–1807), a Naval commander in the Revolutionary War	40,664	424.80 sq mi (1,100 km^{2})	State map highlighting Preble County
Putnam County	137	Ottawa	Apr 1, 1820	Shelby County	General Israel Putnam (1718–1790), a Revolutionary War officer	34,380	483.87 sq mi (1,253 km^{2})	State map highlighting Putnam County
Richland County	139	Mansfield	Mar 1, 1808	Fairfield County	Descriptive of the soil in the area	124,893	496.88 sq mi (1,287 km^{2})	State map highlighting Richland County
Ross County	141	Chillicothe	Aug 20, 1798	Adams and Washington Counties	Named for U.S. Senator from Pennsylvania James Ross by territorial governor Arthur St. Clair	76,429	688.41 sq mi (1,783 km^{2})	State map highlighting Ross County
Sandusky County	143	Fremont	Apr 1, 1820	Huron County	An Iroquois word meaning "cold water"	58,655	409.18 sq mi (1,060 km^{2})	State map highlighting Sandusky County
Scioto County	145	Portsmouth	May 1, 1803	Adams County	Scioto River; Scioto is a Wyandot Indian word meaning "deer"	71,365	612.27 sq mi (1,586 km^{2})	State map highlighting Scioto County
Seneca County	147	Tiffin	Apr 1, 1820	Huron County	Seneca Indians, who had a reservation in the county area at the time	54,522	550.59 sq mi (1,426 km^{2})	State map highlighting Seneca County
Shelby County	149	Sidney	Apr 1, 1819	Miami County	General Isaac Shelby (1750–1826), a Revolutionary War officer and Governor of Kentucky	48,065	409.27 sq mi (1,060 km^{2})	State map highlighting Shelby County
Stark County	151	Canton	Feb 13, 1808	Columbiana County	General John Stark (1728–1822), a Revolutionary War officer; known as the "Hero of Bennington" for his exemplary service at the Battle of Bennington in 1777	373,771	576.14 sq mi (1,492 km^{2})	State map highlighting Stark County
Summit County	153	Akron	Mar 3, 1840	Medina, Portage, and Stark Counties	Its location at the highest elevation along the Ohio and Erie Canal	538,376	419.38 sq mi (1,086 km^{2})	State map highlighting Summit County
Trumbull County	155	Warren	Jul 10, 1800	Jefferson and Wayne Counties	Jonathan Trumbull (1710–1785), Governor of Connecticut when the county was organized	198,972	616.48 sq mi (1,597 km^{2})	State map highlighting Trumbull County
Tuscarawas County	157	New Philadelphia	Mar 15, 1808	Muskingum County	Tuscarawas River, meaning "open mouth river" or the Tuscarawas tribe who lived on the river	92,373	567.58 sq mi (1,470 km^{2})	State map highlighting Tuscarawas County
Union County	159	Marysville	Apr 1, 1820	Delaware, Franklin, Logan, and Madison Counties	Its formation by a union of four counties	73,446	436.65 sq mi (1,131 km^{2})	State map highlighting Union County
Van Wert County	161	Van Wert	Apr 1, 1820	Darke County	Isaac Van Wart (1760–1828), captor of spy John André during the Revolutionary War	29,013	410.09 sq mi (1,062 km^{2})	State map highlighting Van Wert County
Vinton County	163	McArthur	Apr 1, 1850	Athens, Gallia, Hocking, Jackson, and Ross Counties	Samuel Finley Vinton (1792–1862), Ohio Statesman and U.S. Congressman	12,645	414.08 sq mi (1,072 km^{2})	State map highlighting Vinton County
Warren County	165	Lebanon	May 1, 1803	Hamilton County	General Joseph Warren (1741–1775), a Revolutionary War officer	257,181	399.63 sq mi (1,035 km^{2})	State map highlighting Warren County
Washington County	167	Marietta	Jul 27, 1788	One of the original counties	George Washington (1732–1799), commander of the Continental Army, president of the Constitutional Convention, and future President of the United States	58,389	635.15 sq mi (1,645 km^{2})	State map highlighting Washington County
Wayne County	169	Wooster	Feb 13, 1808	Stark County	General Anthony Wayne (1745–1796), a Revolutionary War officer	116,758	555.36 sq mi (1,438 km^{2})	State map highlighting Wayne County
Williams County	171	Bryan	Apr 1, 1820	Darke County	David Williams (1754–1831), captor of spy John André during the Revolutionary War	36,549	421.74 sq mi (1,092 km^{2})	State map highlighting Williams County
Wood County	173	Bowling Green	Apr 1, 1820	Refactored from non-county territory	Eleazer D. Wood (1783–1814), founder of Fort Meigs	134,176	617.32 sq mi (1,599 km^{2})	State map highlighting Wood County
Wyandot County	175	Upper Sandusky	Apr 7, 1845	Marion, Crawford, and Hardin Counties	Wyandot Indians	21,567	405.61 sq mi (1,051 km^{2})	State map highlighting Wyandot County

== Racial / Ethnic Profile of counties in Ohio (2020 Census) ==
Racial / Ethnic Profile of counties in Ohio (2020 Census)
Following is a table of counties in Ohio by race/ethnicity. The majority racial/ethnic group is coded per the key below.

Majority minority with no dominant group
Majority White
Majority Black
Majority Hispanic
Majority Asian

Racial and ethnic composition of counties in Ohio (2020 Census) (NH = Non-Hispanic) Note: the US Census treats Hispanic/Latino as an ethnic category. This table excludes Latinos from the racial categories and assigns them to a separate category. Hispanics/Latinos may be of any race.
County	Location of County	Total Population	White alone (NH)	%	Black or African American alone (NH)	%	Native American or Alaska Native alone (NH)	%	Asian alone (NH)	%	Pacific Islander alone (NH)	%	Other race alone (NH)	%	Mixed race or Multiracial (NH)	%	Hispanic or Latino (any race)	%
Adams		27,477	26,185	95.30%	84	0.31%	74	0.27%	39	0.14%	1	0.00%	33	0.12%	844	3.07%	217	0.79%
Allen		102,206	79,691	77.97%	12,475	12.21%	233	0.23%	835	0.82%	42	0.04%	541	0.53%	5,117	5.01%	3,272	3.20%
Ashland		52,447	48,948	93.33%	383	0.73%	82	0.16%	322	0.61%	33	0.06%	103	0.20%	1,714	3.27%	862	1.64%
Ashtabula		97,574	84,064	86.15%	3,492	3.58%	154	0.16%	338	0.35%	12	0.01%	260	0.27%	4,765	4.88%	4,489	4.60%
Athens		62,431	54,086	86.63%	2,768	4.43%	223	0.36%	1,210	1.94%	1	0.00%	256	0.41%	2,437	3.90%	1,450	2.32%
Auglaize		46,422	43,643	94.01%	231	0.50%	76	0.16%	242	0.52%	40	0.09%	71	0.15%	1,338	2.88%	781	1.68%
Belmont		66,497	60,536	91.04%	2,071	3.11%	83	0.12%	265	0.40%	11	0.02%	130	0.20%	2,577	3.88%	824	1.24%
Brown		43,676	41,053	94.00%	302	0.69%	68	0.16%	84	0.19%	2	0.00%	111	0.25%	1,569	3.59%	487	1.12%
Butler		390,357	294,712	75.50%	34,144	8.75%	610	0.16%	15,658	4.01%	480	0.12%	1,546	0.40%	17,942	4.60%	25,265	6.47%
Carroll		26,721	25,204	94.32%	122	0.46%	73	0.27%	52	0.19%	3	0.01%	56	0.21%	912	3.41%	299	1.12%
Champaign		38,714	35,314	91.22%	683	1.76%	79	0.20%	125	0.32%	7	0.02%	139	0.36%	1,719	4.44%	648	1.67%
Clark		136,001	109,794	80.73%	12,074	8.88%	314	0.23%	898	0.66%	91	0.07%	538	0.40%	6,979	5.13%	5,313	3.91%
Clermont		208,601	187,749	90.00%	3,245	1.56%	345	0.17%	2,529	1.21%	58	0.03%	611	0.29%	9,108	4.37%	4,956	2.38%
Clinton		42,018	38,247	91.03%	819	1.95%	96	0.23%	205	0.49%	6	0.01%	165	0.39%	1,715	4.08%	765	1.82%
Columbiana		101,877	93,466	91.74%	2,082	2.04%	161	0.16%	345	0.34%	16	0.02%	217	0.21%	3,838	3.77%	1,752	1.72%
Coshocton		36,612	34,582	94.45%	389	1.06%	57	0.16%	98	0.27%	7	0.02%	47	0.13%	1,031	2.82%	401	1.10%
Crawford		42,025	39,388	93.73%	305	0.73%	40	0.10%	131	0.31%	12	0.03%	70	0.17%	1,441	3.43%	638	1.52%
Cuyahoga		1,264,817	718,753	56.83%	365,169	28.87%	1,827	0.14%	43,739	3.46%	249	0.02%	5,745	0.45%	46,008	3.64%	83,327	6.59%
Darke		51,881	48,994	94.44%	302	0.58%	92	0.18%	181	0.35%	26	0.05%	122	0.24%	1,305	2.52%	859	1.66%
Defiance		38,286	32,276	84.30%	598	1.56%	79	0.21%	133	0.35%	15	0.04%	88	0.23%	1,147	3.00%	3,950	10.32%
Delaware		214,124	171,420	80.06%	7,702	3.60%	242	0.11%	18,158	8.48%	60	0.03%	823	0.38%	8,707	4.07%	7,012	3.28%
Erie		75,622	61,061	80.75%	6,655	8.80%	121	0.16%	474	0.63%	10	0.01%	232	0.31%	3,939	5.21%	3,130	4.14%
Fairfield		158,921	130,664	82.22%	13,302	8.37%	287	0.18%	3,063	1.93%	31	0.02%	515	0.32%	7,038	4.43%	4,021	2.53%
Fayette		28,951	26,260	90.70%	521	1.80%	43	0.15%	171	0.59%	11	0.04%	88	0.30%	1,176	4.06%	681	2.35%
Franklin		1,323,807	787,615	59.50%	296,076	22.37%	2,160	0.16%	73,714	5.57%	444	0.03%	7,212	0.54%	65,404	4.94%	91,182	6.89%
Fulton		42,713	36,968	86.55%	225	0.53%	60	0.14%	152	0.36%	6	0.01%	120	0.28%	1,391	3.26%	3,791	8.88%
Gallia		29,220	26,955	92.25%	597	2.04%	55	0.19%	148	0.51%	5	0.02%	79	0.27%	1,119	3.83%	262	0.90%
Geauga		95,397	88,958	93.25%	1,075	1.13%	36	0.04%	666	0.70%	8	0.01%	220	0.23%	2,770	2.90%	1,664	1.74%
Greene		167,966	135,603	80.73%	11,285	6.72%	330	0.20%	5,516	3.28%	87	0.05%	876	0.52%	9,053	5.39%	5,216	3.11%
Guernsey		38,438	35,717	92.92%	520	1.35%	87	0.23%	149	0.39%	7	0.02%	65	0.17%	1,449	3.77%	444	1.15%
Hamilton		830,639	519,734	62.57%	207,764	25.01%	1,173	0.14%	25,160	3.03%	618	0.07%	3,959	0.48%	35,981	4.33%	36,250	4.36%
Hancock		74,920	65,107	86.90%	1,363	1.82%	79	0.11%	1,393	1.86%	26	0.03%	220	0.29%	2,534	3.38%	4,198	5.60%
Hardin		30,696	28,389	92.48%	256	0.83%	48	0.16%	169	0.55%	8	0.03%	69	0.22%	1,060	3.45%	697	2.27%
Harrison		14,483	13,425	92.70%	234	1.62%	14	0.10%	40	0.28%	6	0.04%	18	0.12%	616	4.25%	130	0.90%
Henry		27,662	24,463	88.44%	155	0.56%	49	0.18%	125	0.45%	4	0.01%	43	0.16%	636	2.30%	2,187	7.91%
Highland		43,317	40,492	93.48%	518	1.20%	109	0.25%	110	0.25%	8	0.02%	96	0.22%	1,560	3.60%	424	0.98%
Hocking		28,050	26,502	94.48%	139	0.50%	45	0.16%	71	0.25%	0	0.00%	53	0.19%	1,008	3.59%	232	0.83%
Holmes		44,223	42,875	96.95%	119	0.27%	33	0.07%	64	0.14%	5	0.01%	41	0.09%	612	1.38%	474	1.07%
Huron		58,565	51,242	87.50%	562	0.96%	139	0.24%	216	0.37%	12	0.02%	106	0.18%	2,204	3.76%	4,084	6.97%
Jackson		32,653	30,835	94.43%	158	0.48%	88	0.27%	101	0.31%	1	0.00%	50	0.15%	1,114	3.41%	306	0.94%
Jefferson		65,249	56,545	86.66%	3,619	5.55%	109	0.17%	338	0.52%	29	0.04%	244	0.37%	3,206	4.91%	1,159	1.78%
Knox		62,721	58,058	92.57%	565	0.90%	118	0.19%	365	0.58%	17	0.03%	237	0.38%	2,165	3.45%	1,196	1.91%
Lake		232,603	197,069	84.72%	10,778	4.63%	236	0.10%	3,255	1.40%	38	0.02%	604	0.26%	9,261	3.98%	11,362	4.88%
Lawrence		58,240	54,016	92.75%	1,100	1.89%	134	0.23%	219	0.38%	7	0.01%	135	0.23%	2,011	3.45%	618	1.06%
Licking		178,519	152,935	85.67%	7,142	4.00%	386	0.22%	4,999	2.80%	45	0.03%	787	0.44%	8,237	4.61%	3,988	2.23%
Logan		46,150	41,749	90.46%	673	1.46%	83	0.18%	327	0.71%	11	0.02%	181	0.39%	2,122	4.60%	1,004	2.18%
Lorain		312,964	237,520	75.89%	22,980	7.34%	502	0.16%	3,569	1.14%	50	0.02%	1,020	0.33%	14,406	4.60%	32,917	10.52%
Lucas		431,279	284,663	66.00%	83,398	19.34%	817	0.19%	7,089	1.64%	115	0.03%	1,926	0.45%	21,104	4.89%	32,167	7.46%
Madison		43,824	37,761	86.16%	2,664	6.08%	59	0.13%	253	0.58%	4	0.01%	176	0.40%	1,644	3.75%	1,263	2.88%
Mahoning		228,614	169,090	73.96%	33,770	14.77%	332	0.15%	1,952	0.85%	59	0.03%	708	0.31%	8,610	3.77%	14,093	6.16%
Marion		65,359	56,114	85.86%	4,051	6.20%	140	0.21%	358	0.55%	15	0.02%	167	0.26%	2,558	3.91%	1,956	2.99%
Medina		182,470	165,643	90.78%	2,292	1.26%	192	0.11%	2,184	1.20%	28	0.02%	589	0.32%	6,950	3.81%	4,592	2.52%
Meigs		22,210	21,180	95.36%	148	0.67%	49	0.22%	22	0.10%	0	0.00%	43	0.19%	596	2.68%	172	0.77%
Mercer		42,528	39,752	93.47%	191	0.45%	63	0.15%	189	0.44%	564	1.33%	78	0.18%	763	1.79%	928	2.18%
Miami		108,774	96,964	89.14%	2,559	2.35%	152	0.14%	1,644	1.51%	21	0.02%	483	0.44%	4,752	4.37%	2,199	2.02%
Monroe		13,385	12,909	96.44%	19	0.14%	12	0.09%	21	0.16%	3	0.02%	19	0.14%	335	2.50%	67	0.50%
Montgomery		537,309	360,396	67.07%	112,818	21.00%	937	0.17%	12,714	2.37%	244	0.05%	2,588	0.48%	26,433	4.92%	21,179	3.94%
Morgan		13,802	12,525	90.75%	396	2.87%	20	0.14%	24	0.17%	2	0.01%	49	0.36%	659	4.77%	127	0.92%
Morrow		34,950	32,773	93.77%	153	0.44%	56	0.16%	90	0.26%	8	0.02%	93	0.27%	1,197	3.42%	580	1.66%
Muskingum		86,410	76,947	89.05%	2,985	3.45%	138	0.16%	384	0.44%	8	0.01%	378	0.44%	4,515	5.23%	1,055	1.22%
Noble		14,115	12,840	90.97%	752	5.33%	31	0.22%	22	0.16%	0	0.00%	11	0.08%	286	2.03%	173	1.23%
Ottawa		40,364	36,436	90.27%	335	0.83%	47	0.12%	157	0.39%	6	0.01%	92	0.23%	1,232	3.05%	2,059	5.10%
Paulding		18,806	16,972	90.25%	139	0.74%	41	0.22%	30	0.16%	5	0.03%	61	0.32%	548	2.91%	1,010	5.37%
Perry		35,408	33,595	94.88%	90	0.25%	94	0.27%	67	0.19%	0	0.00%	85	0.24%	1,225	3.46%	252	0.71%
Pickaway		58,539	52,416	89.54%	2,143	3.66%	131	0.22%	296	0.51%	11	0.02%	153	0.26%	2,486	4.25%	903	1.54%
Pike		27,088	25,470	94.03%	190	0.70%	110	0.41%	70	0.26%	6	0.02%	44	0.16%	979	3.61%	219	0.81%
Portage		161,791	138,774	85.77%	7,934	4.90%	233	0.14%	3,400	2.10%	38	0.02%	558	0.34%	7,349	4.54%	3,505	2.17%
Preble		40,999	38,700	94.39%	182	0.44%	84	0.20%	162	0.40%	4	0.01%	98	0.24%	1,383	3.37%	386	0.94%
Putnam		34,451	31,427	91.22%	100	0.29%	25	0.07%	61	0.18%	3	0.01%	61	0.18%	545	1.58%	2,229	6.47%
Richland		124,936	104,231	83.43%	11,216	8.98%	192	0.15%	791	0.63%	58	0.05%	473	0.38%	5,360	4.29%	2,615	2.09%
Ross		77,093	67,705	87.82%	4,005	5.19%	189	0.25%	369	0.48%	20	0.03%	196	0.25%	3,578	4.64%	1,031	1.34%
Sandusky		58,896	48,219	81.87%	1,762	2.99%	75	0.13%	202	0.34%	7	0.01%	159	0.27%	2,417	4.10%	6,055	10.28%
Scioto		74,008	67,531	91.25%	2,038	2.75%	254	0.34%	274	0.37%	9	0.01%	210	0.28%	2,640	3.57%	1,052	1.42%
Seneca		55,069	48,213	87.55%	1,314	2.39%	66	0.12%	359	0.65%	36	0.07%	158	0.29%	2,024	3.68%	2,899	5.26%
Shelby		48,230	44,067	91.37%	839	1.74%	81	0.17%	450	0.93%	29	0.06%	188	0.39%	1,789	3.71%	787	1.63%
Stark		374,853	310,535	82.84%	28,723	7.66%	721	0.19%	3,175	0.85%	97	0.03%	1,651	0.44%	19,435	5.18%	10,516	2.81%
Summit		540,428	397,536	73.56%	78,922	14.60%	777	0.14%	22,506	4.16%	149	0.03%	2,096	0.39%	25,236	4.67%	13,206	2.44%
Trumbull		201,977	169,627	83.98%	16,940	8.39%	249	0.12%	1,099	0.54%	26	0.01%	609	0.30%	9,248	4.58%	4,179	2.07%
Tuscarawas		93,263	84,979	91.12%	697	0.75%	117	0.13%	306	0.33%	29	0.03%	169	0.18%	3,004	3.22%	3,962	4.25%
Union		62,784	53,287	84.87%	1,275	2.03%	93	0.15%	4,043	6.44%	0	0.00%	201	0.32%	2,351	3.74%	1,534	2.44%
Van Wert		28,931	26,467	91.48%	257	0.89%	37	0.13%	88	0.30%	13	0.04%	79	0.27%	893	3.09%	1,097	3.79%
Vinton		12,800	12,213	95.41%	43	0.34%	19	0.15%	22	0.17%	0	0.00%	14	0.11%	405	3.16%	84	0.66%
Warren		242,337	198,227	81.80%	8,175	3.37%	288	0.12%	17,278	7.13%	158	0.07%	704	0.29%	9,769	4.03%	7,738	3.19%
Washington		59,771	55,663	93.13%	600	1.00%	114	0.19%	309	0.52%	8	0.01%	158	0.26%	2,202	3.68%	717	1.20%
Wayne		116,894	106,930	91.48%	1,755	1.50%	142	0.12%	950	0.81%	32	0.03%	283	0.24%	4,047	3.46%	2,755	2.36%
Williams		37,102	33,483	90.25%	323	0.87%	55	0.15%	198	0.53%	0	0.00%	92	0.25%	1,089	2.94%	1,862	5.02%
Wood		132,248	112,493	85.06%	3,089	2.34%	164	0.12%	2,750	2.08%	9	0.01%	330	0.25%	5,133	3.88%	8,280	6.26%
Wyandot		21,900	20,520	93.70%	77	0.35%	21	0.10%	85	0.39%	3	0.01%	45	0.21%	508	2.32%	641	2.93%

== List of county codes ==
The Federal Information Processing Standard (FIPS) is used by the U.S. government to uniquely identify counties. In the following table, these codes link to the United States Census Bureau's "quick facts" for each county. Ohio's FIPS code of 39 is used to distinguish from counties in other states. For example, Adams County's unique nationwide identifier is 39001.

Various state agencies identify counties by different coding schemes. The Ohio Department of Taxation assigns consecutive numbers for the purpose of enumerating taxing districts. The Ohio Department of Public Safety, including the Ohio Bureau of Motor Vehicles, associates these county numbers with vehicle registrations. The Department of Transportation uses three-letter abbreviations in road inventory and traffic management applications. For historic preservation purposes, Ohio History Connection refers to counties by two- and three-letter abbreviations in the Ohio Archaeological Inventory and Ohio Historic Inventory, respectively.

County	FIPS code	ODPS/ODT code	OAI code	ODOT/OHI code
Adams County	001	01	AD	ADA
Allen County	003	02	AL	ALL
Ashland County	005	03	AS	ASD
Ashtabula County	007	04	AB	ATB
Athens County	009	05	AT	ATH
Auglaize County	011	06	AU	AUG
Belmont County	013	07	BL	BEL
Brown County	015	08	BR	BRO
Butler County	017	09	BU	BUT
Carroll County	019	10	CA	CAR
Champaign County	021	11	CH	CHP
Clark County	023	12	CL	CLA
Clermont County	025	13	CT	CLE
Clinton County	027	14	CN	CLI
Columbiana County	029	15	CO	COL
Coshocton County	031	16	CS	COS
Crawford County	033	17	CR	CRA
Cuyahoga County	035	18	CU	CUY
Darke County	037	19	DA	DAR
Defiance County	039	20	DE	DEF
Delaware County	041	21	DL	DEL
Erie County	043	22	ER	ERI
Fairfield County	045	23	FA	FAI
Fayette County	047	24	FE	FAY
Franklin County	049	25	FR	FRA
Fulton County	051	26	FU	FUL
Gallia County	053	27	GA	GAL
Geauga County	055	28	GE	GEA
Greene County	057	29	GR	GRE
Guernsey County	059	30	GU	GUE
Hamilton County	061	31	HA	HAM
Hancock County	063	32	HK	HAN
Hardin County	065	33	HR	HAR
Harrison County	067	34	HN	HAS
Henry County	069	35	HY	HEN
Highland County	071	36	HI	HIG
Hocking County	073	37	HO	HOC
Holmes County	075	38	HS	HOL
Huron County	077	39	HU	HUR
Jackson County	079	40	JA	JAC
Jefferson County	081	41	JE	JEF
Knox County	083	42	KN	KNO
Lake County	085	43	LA	LAK
Lawrence County	087	44	LE	LAW
Licking County	089	45	LI	LIC
Logan County	091	46	LO	LOG
Lorain County	093	47	LN	LOR
Lucas County	095	48	LU	LUC
Madison County	097	49	MA	MAD
Mahoning County	099	50	MH	MAH
Marion County	101	51	MN	MAR
Medina County	103	52	ME	MED
Meigs County	105	53	MS	MEG
Mercer County	107	54	MR	MER
Miami County	109	55	MI	MIA
Monroe County	111	56	MO	MOE
Montgomery County	113	57	MY	MOT
Morgan County	115	58	MG	MRG
Morrow County	117	59	MW	MRW
Muskingum County	119	60	MU	MUS
Noble County	121	61	NO	NOB
Ottawa County	123	62	OT	OTT
Paulding County	125	63	PA	PAU
Perry County	127	64	PE	PER
Pickaway County	129	65	PI	PIC
Pike County	131	66	PK	PIK
Portage County	133	67	PO	POR
Preble County	135	68	PR	PRE
Putnam County	137	69	PU	PUT
Richland County	139	70	RI	RIC
Ross County	141	71	RO	ROS
Sandusky County	143	72	SA	SAN
Scioto County	145	73	SC	SCI
Seneca County	147	74	SE	SEN
Shelby County	149	75	SH	SHE
Stark County	151	76	ST	STA
Summit County	153	77	SU	SUM
Trumbull County	155	78	TR	TRU
Tuscarawas County	157	79	TU	TUS
Union County	159	80	UN	UNI
Van Wert County	161	81	VW	VAN
Vinton County	163	82	VI	VIN
Warren County	165	83	WA	WAR
Washington County	167	84	WN	WAS
Wayne County	169	85	WE	WAY
Williams County	171	86	WI	WIL
Wood County	173	87	WO	WOO
Wyandot County	175	88	WY	WYA

== See also ==
- Ohio county government
- List of Ohio townships
- Illinois County, Virginia, the county that formerly covered all of present-day Ohio
