= Seth Pomeroy's Ride (poem) =

1911 poem by Katherine Tryon Shepherd-Smith

Seth Pomeroy's Ride is a poem written by Katherine Tryon Shepherd-Smith in 1911. It chronicles Seth Pomeroy's horseback ride from Northampton, Massachusetts to Breed's Hill, located in the Charlestown section of Boston, Massachusetts, where he took part in the Battle of Bunker Hill during the American Revolutionary War. Additionally, the poem touches upon Pomeroy's military service during the French and Indian War and King George's War.
