= Old St. Peter's Church (Van Cortlandtville, New York) =

Historic church in New York, United States

- Old St. Peter's Church and Old Van Cortlandtville Cemetery
- U.S. National Register of Historic Places
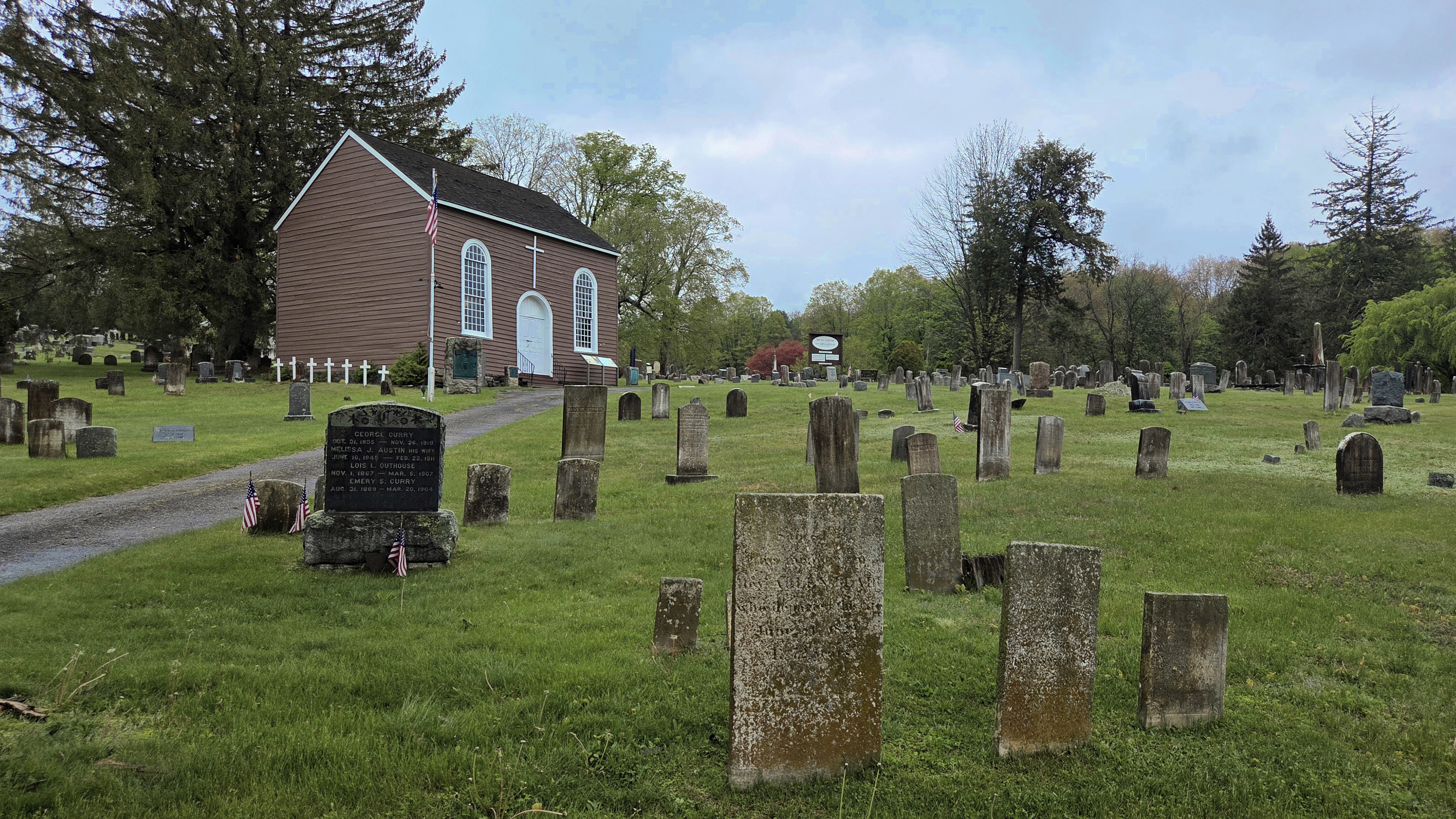
- Old St. Peter's Church and Old Van Cortlandtville Cemetery

- Location within New York Location within the United States
- Location: Oregon Rd. and Locust Ave., Van Cortlandtville, New York
- Coordinates: 41°18′49.21″N 73°54′4.23″W
- Area: 6.5 acres (2.6 ha)
- Built: 1766
- NRHP reference No.: 73001292
- Added to NRHP: March 7, 1973

Old St. Peter's Church and Old Van Cortlandtville Cemetery, also known as St. Peter's Church and Old Cemetery of Cortlandt is a historic Episcopal church and churchyard at Oregon Road and Locust Avenue in Van Cortlandtville—a historic neighborhood of the town of Cortlandt, Westchester County, New York. The church was built in 1766 and restored in 1964. A wood-frame building sheathed in clapboards, it measures 28 feet by 36 feet. The nearby Elmsford Reformed Church was built in 1793 and is a close replica.

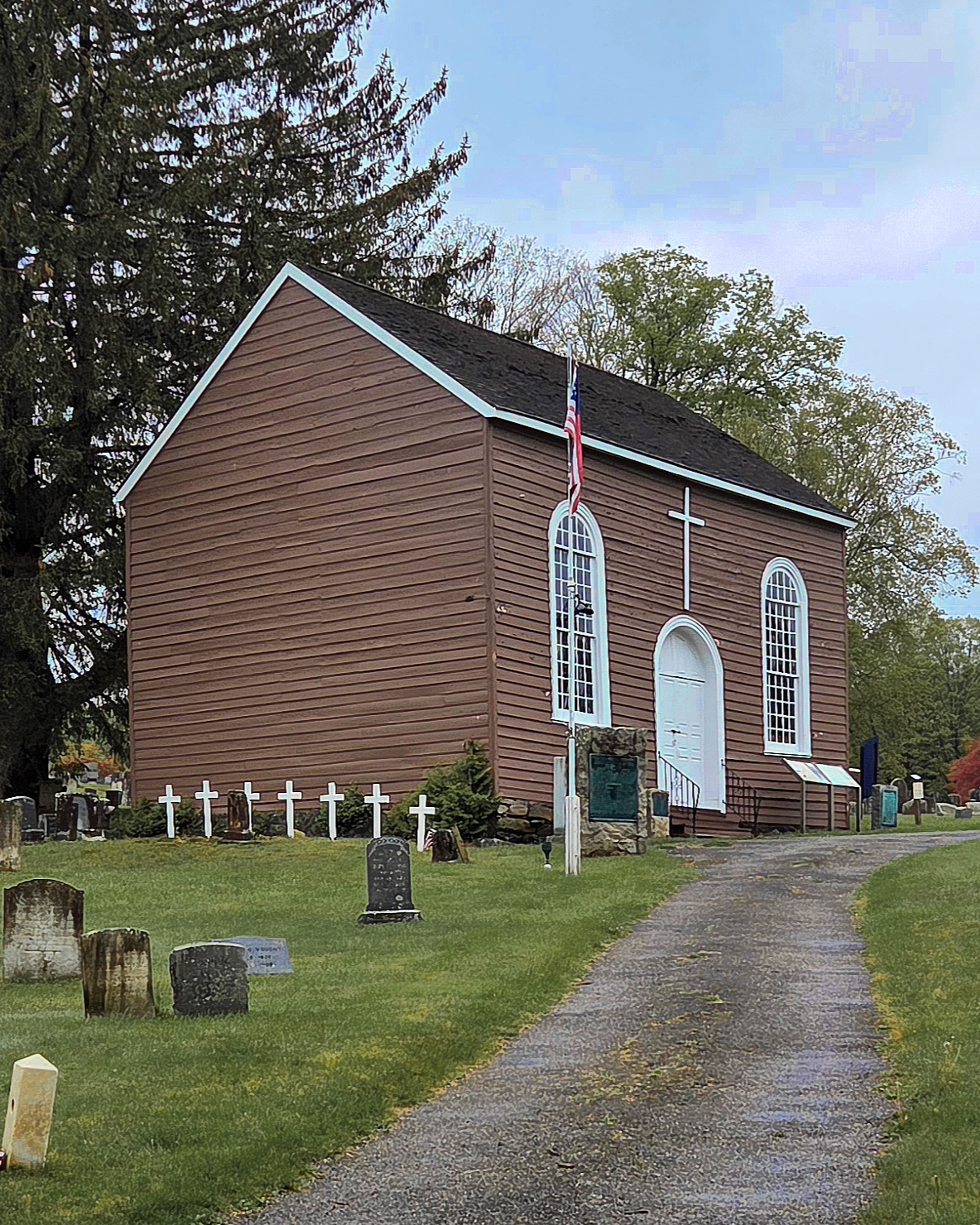
The church in 2026

During the Revolutionary War, the church was attended by General George Washington when he stayed at Van Cortlandt Upper Manor House and also served as a field hospital for Comte de Rochambeau's French troops. Its churchyard contains graves of 8 French soldiers and 44 American soldiers, with memorial markers.

John Paulding, a Revolutionary War militiaman famous for capturing spy Major John André, was buried in the cemetery in 1818. (He was a lifelong resident and prominent figure of the Cortlandt area.) A large marble monument was erected over his grave in 1827 by the City of New York. In 2017, a new bronze plaque was dedicated at his gravesite to clarify the original, weathered text of the 90-year-old monument.

Major General Seth Pomeroy, who died in Peekskill in February 1777 on his way to reinforce General George Washington’s Continental Army with his Massachusetts militia unit, was buried in the Old Van Cortlandtville Cemetery in an unmarked grave. A black granite anvil-shaped monument honoring Seth Pomeroy was dedicated in the cemetery in 2008. It was placed near the Locust Avenue entrance of the cemetery because that is the area where Seth Pomeroy is believed to be buried. The Pomeroy Anvil Monument also commemorates the Pomeroy family's long history as blacksmiths, gunsmiths, and soldiers.

The property was added to the National Register of Historic Places in 1973 with reference number 73001292. In an "additional documentation approval" listing, for the same reference number, the National Register included more information about the property in an expanded listing, in 2004. The documentation itself, dated 2003, describes one contributing site (the cemetery) and one contributing object, in addition to the already listed one contributing building of the property.

The Old Van Cortlandtville Cemetery is adjacent to Hillside Cemetery (in Cortlandt Manor), established in the 1850s. Historical markers for the Old Van Cortlandtville Cemetery are located at the entrance to the Hillside Cemetery property.

== See also ==
- National Register of Historic Places listings in northern Westchester County, New York
