= Seth Pomeroy =

American gunsmith & soldier (1706–1777)

- Born: May 20, 1706; Northampton, Massachusetts, English America
- Died: February 19, 1777 (aged 70); Peekskill, New York, U.S.
- Spouse: Mary Hunt (m. 1732)
- Children: Seth, Quartus, Medad, Lemuel, Martha, Mary, Sarah, Asahel, and 1 other
- Military career
- Allegiance: Great Britain; United Colonies; United States
- Service years: 1745 (Great Britain); 1775-1776 (United Colonies); 1776-1777 (United States)
- Conflicts: King George's War; 1st Siege of Louisbourg; French and Indian War; Battle of Lake George; American Revolutionary War; Siege of Boston; Battle of Bunker Hill

Seth Pomeroy (May 20, 1706 – February 19, 1777) was an American gunsmith and soldier from Northampton, Massachusetts. His military service included the French and Indian War and the early stages of the American Revolutionary War. He fought as a private soldier in the Battle of Bunker Hill, but was later appointed a major general in the Massachusetts militia.

== Private life ==
Seth was born in Northampton, Province of Massachusetts Bay, to Ebeneezer and Sarah (King) Pomeroy. His father was a prominent local citizen, and had been a Major in the militia. Seth became a mechanic and gunsmith, as well as joining the local militia in Hampshire County. He earned a reputation as one of the best gunsmiths in the colony.

Pomeroy married Mary Hunt (1705–1777) on December 14, 1732. They had nine children: Seth (b.1733), Quartus (b.1735), Medad (b.1736), Lemuel (b.1738), Martha (b.1740), Mary (b.1742), Sarah (b. 1744), A child born in 1747, and Asahel (b.1749).

== King George's War ==
When Massachusetts undertook an expedition against the French in Nova Scotia, Major Pomeroy answered Governor William Shirley's call for volunteers. He was part of the expedition led by William Pepperrell that captured Fortress Louisbourg in Nova Scotia in 1745. He used his professional skills in support of Richard Gridley, the expedition's chief engineering officer. He reconditioned the guns captured from an outlying position after the French had spiked them and supported 46 days of heavy bombardment.

== French and Indian War ==
In 1755, Lt. Colonel Pomeroy was second in command of the regiment led by Colonel Ephraim Williams. They marched to New York to support a move to capture Crown Point.

While on the march, they were ambushed by a force of 800 French and Canadian troops, supported by 600 Iroquois warriors, and led by Baron Dieskau at the Battle of Lake George. Of all the commanding officers, Pomeroy was the only one to survive the battle, and in lieu of Williams' death assumed the rank of Colonel. Although suffering significant losses, they withdrew to the English camp at the south end of Lake George. There they built a hasty wall of wood and carts and made their stand, supported by cannon and additional forces under General William Johnson. The natives and Canadians would not attack in the open. When Baron Dieskau was wounded, the entire French force withdrew for Fort Carillon (later called Fort Ticonderoga).

Dieskau was captured, and Johnson would build a more permanent Fort William Henry to protect the site.

== American Revolutionary War ==
Coat of Arms of Seth Pomeroy

Although a senior officer in the Massachusetts militia at the start of the war, Pomeroy had a limited role. He was, after all, nearly seventy years old. But when the Siege of Boston began in 1775, he was among the volunteers that went in support of it. On June 17, a British naval bombardment marked the start of the Battle of Bunker Hill. He borrowed a horse from General Artemas Ward and set out for Charlestown. When he reached the neck of the peninsula, he found troops piled up because the narrow strip was under fire from British warships. Giving the horse to a soldier to return, he shouldered his musket and marched through the barrage. He declined any command, but took a post at the rail fence, fighting with John Stark's 1st New Hampshire Regiment.

The next week, the Continental Congress named him a brigadier general in the Continental Army. Since his health was not the best, when difficulties arose about seniority, he declined this commission and served instead as a major general in the Massachusetts militia.

When General George Washington asked for support in New Jersey the following year, Pomeroy marched with his militia unit. He didn't complete the trip, but fell ill and died of pleurisy in Peekskill, New York.

== Pomeroy Monuments ==
He is buried in the Old Van Cortlandtville Cemetery, in an unmarked grave. A black granite anvil-shaped monument honoring Seth Pomeroy was dedicated in the cemetery in 2008. It was placed near the Locust Avenue entrance of the cemetery because that is the area where Seth Pomeroy is believed to be buried. The Pomeroy Anvil Monument also commemorates the Pomeroy family's long history as blacksmiths, gunsmiths, and soldiers.

Honoring Seth Pomeroy in the adjacent Hillside Cemetery (Cortlandt Manor) is a 30-foot-high granite monument, consisting of a large square base, a column, and a ball on top. Inscribed in a wreath on one side is "General Seth Pomeroy. Born at Northampton, Mass., May 20th 1706. Died near this spot Feb. 19th 1777." Inscribed on another side is a quote from him dated February 11, 1777, at Peekskill, perhaps referring to his facing his last days: "I go cheerfully, for I am sure the cause we are engaged in is just, and the call I have to it is clear, and the call of God." The monument was dedicated by the Sons of the Revolution in 1898.

=== Gallery ===
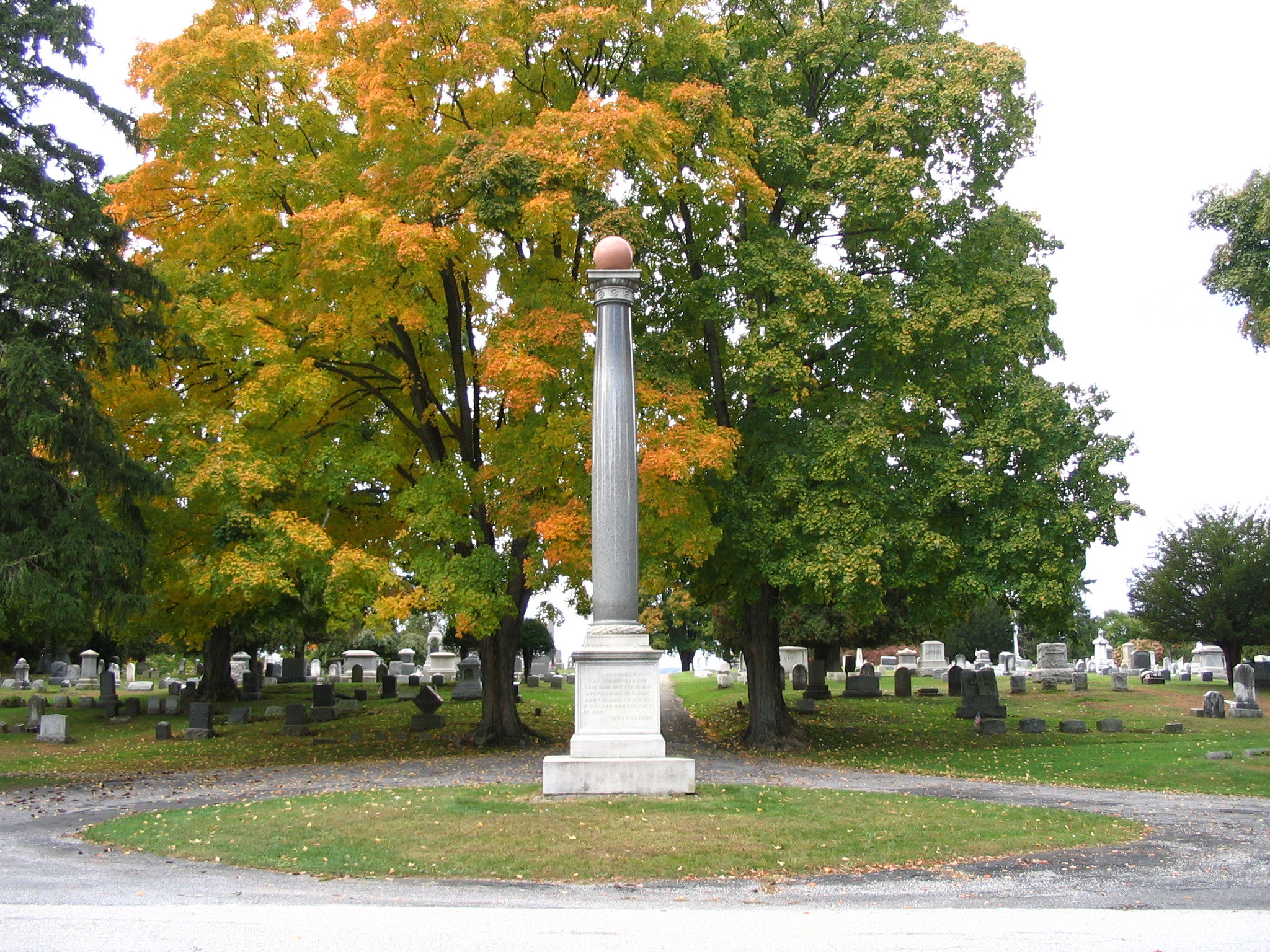
Seth Pomeroy monument in Hillside Cemetery

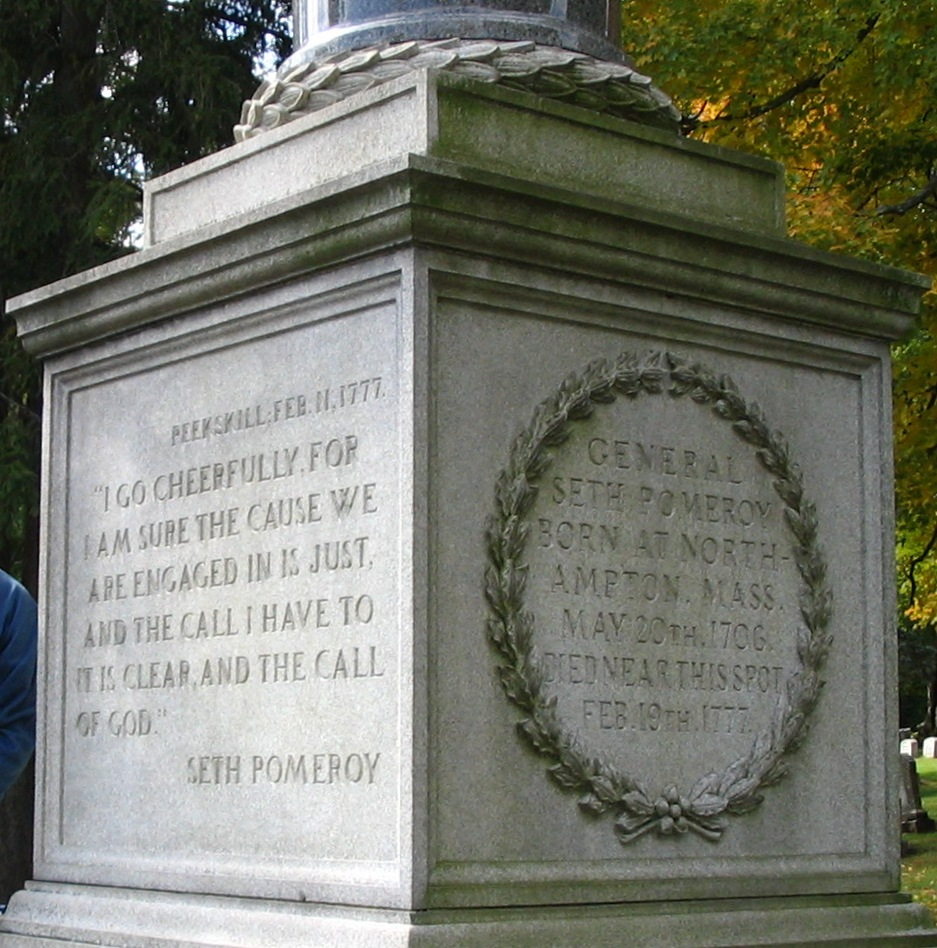
Base of monument

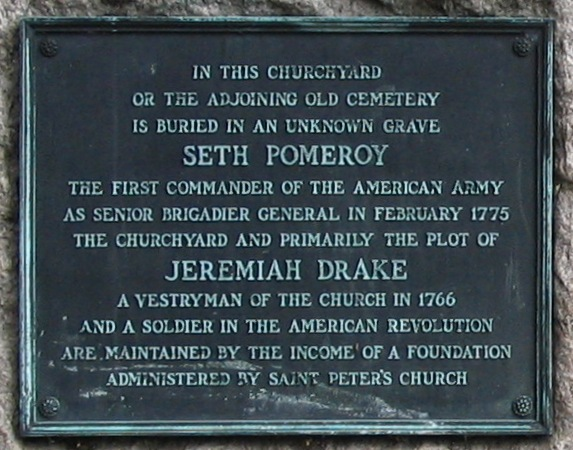
Plaque near the Old Van Cortlandtville Cemetery

== Bibliography ==
- The Journals and Papers of Seth Pomeroy, edited by Louis DeForest. New Haven, Ct, 1926.
- Samuel Adams Drake, The Taking of Louisburg 1745, Boston Mass.: Lee and Shepard Publishers, 1891 (reprinted by Kessinger Publishing ISBN 978-0-548-62234-6)
- Correira, David (2011). "Seth Pomeroy: The Forgotten General". Early America Review. 15. Archived from the original on 2016-08-21.

== See also ==
- Seth Pomeroy's Ride (poem)
