= Elmsford Reformed Church and Cemetery =

Historic site in Westchester County, New York

- U.S. National Register of Historic Places
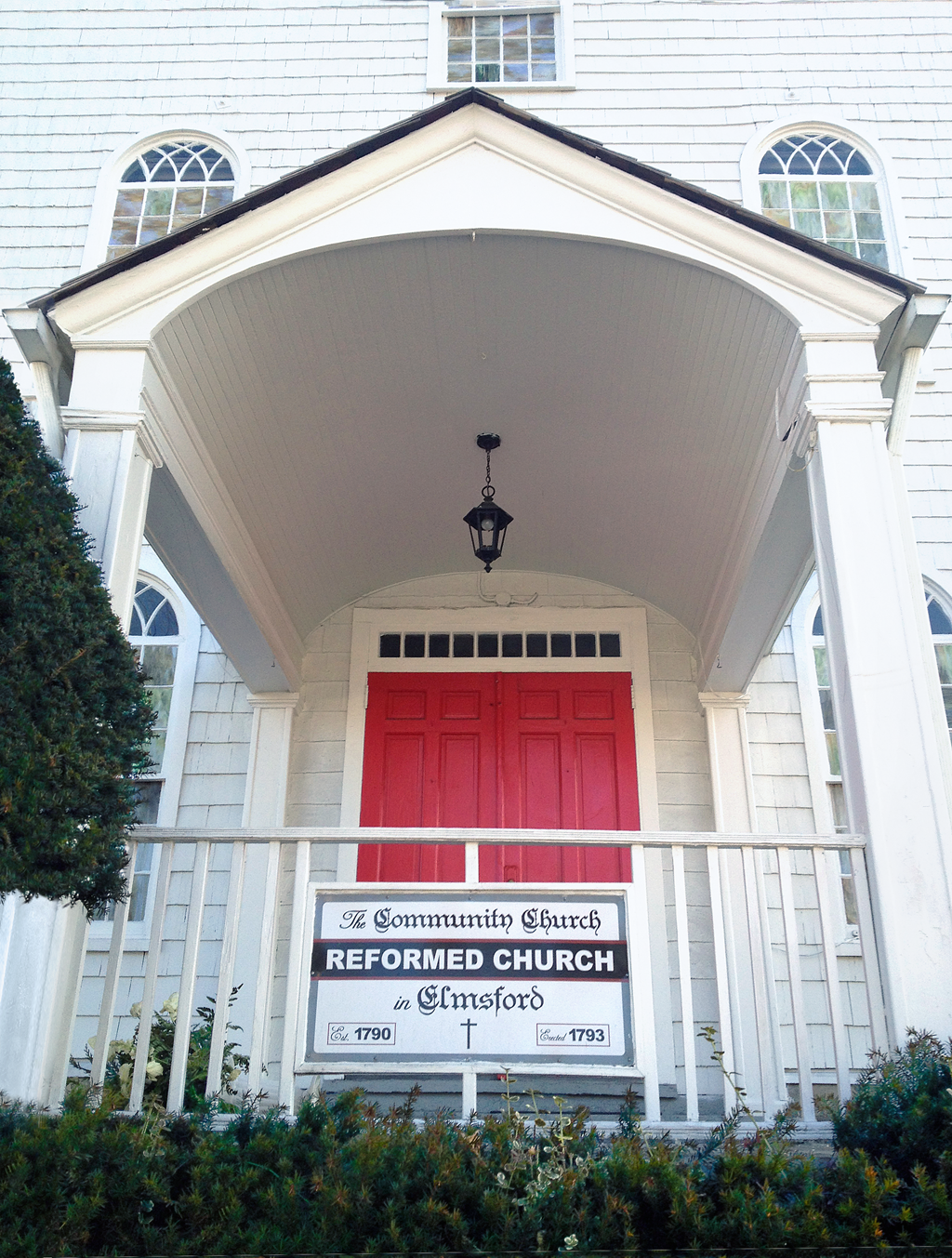

- Location within New York Location within the United States
- Location: 30 S. Central Ave., Elmsford, New York
- Coordinates: 41°3′14″N 73°49′13″W
- Area: less than one acre
- Built: 1793
- NRHP reference No.: 83001828
- Added to NRHP: September 15, 1983

Elmsford Reformed Church and Cemetery is a historic Dutch Reformed church/meeting house and cemetery at 30 S. Central Avenue in Elmsford, Westchester County, New York, United States. It was built in 1793 and is believed to be the county's oldest church in regular use.

A two-story, wood-frame building is constructed of hand-hewn beams, shingles, and hand-wrought nails. Most of the ornamentation in the church dates to the 1820s. It is almost identical to nearby Old St. Peter's Church.

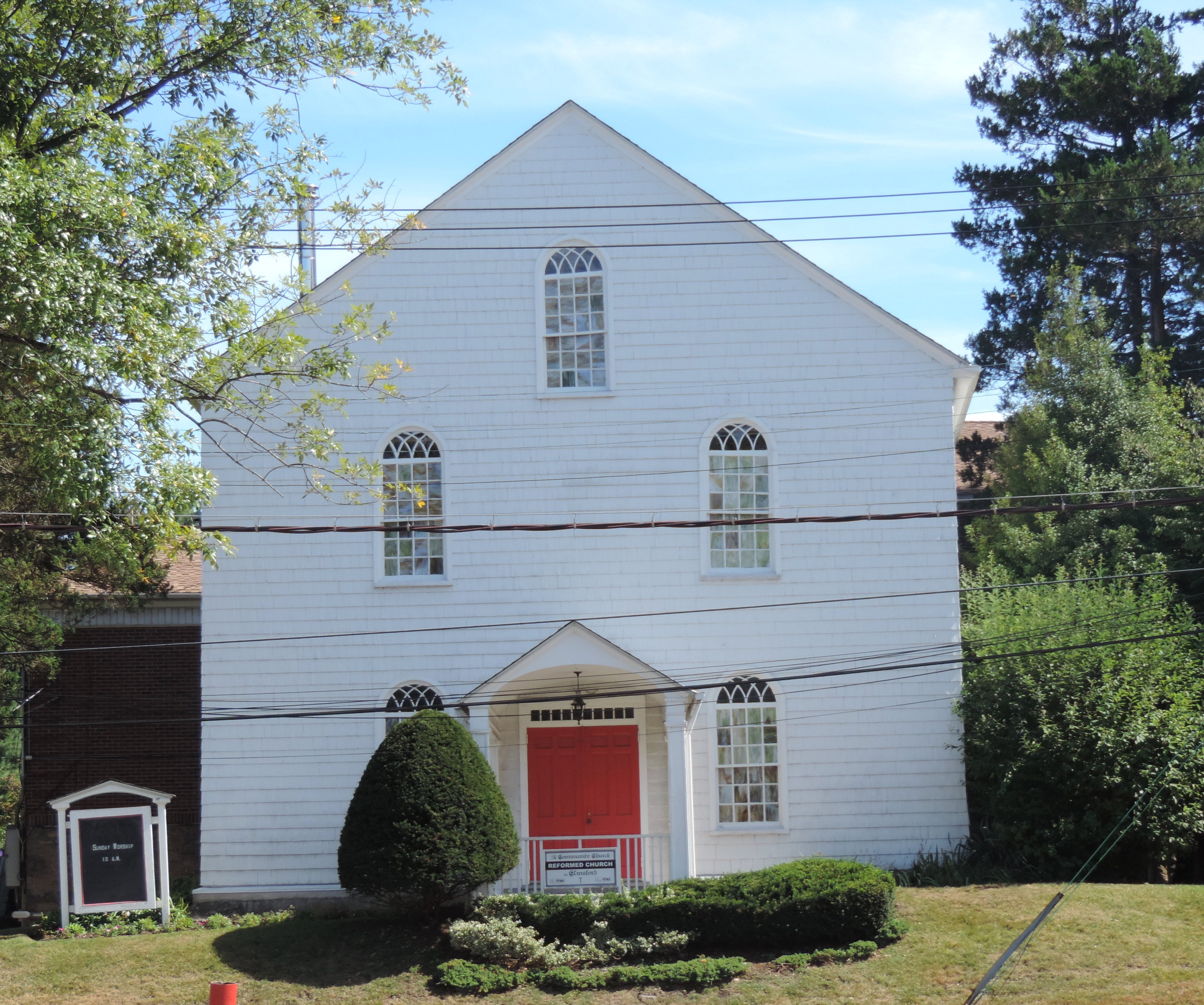
Front facade

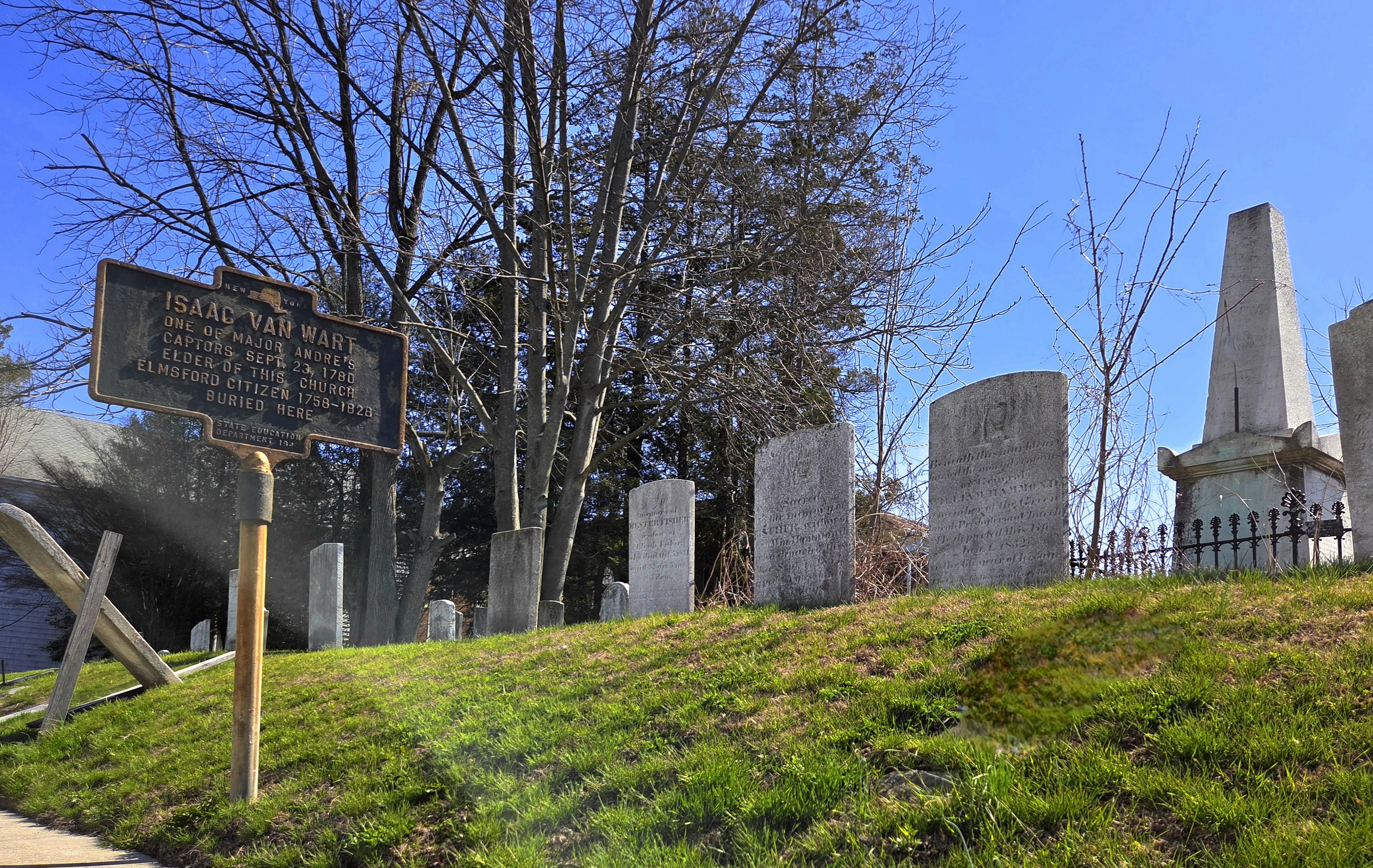
Isaac Van Wart's grave (far right) and historical marker at the church cemetery

The cemetery dates to the 18th century and contains the graves of a number of Revolutionary War veterans, including Isaac Van Wart (1762 - 1828), one of the captors of John André. He was a vestryman of the church for many years and sang in its choir. His imposing monument has dominated the small cemetery ever since it was erected by "The Citizens of the County of Westchester" in 1829.

Because the church consistently maintained a small congregation, it never needed to expand its building or relocate to a larger site. Although the interior has undergone some changes over the years, the exterior has remained largely unchanged since the time of its original construction.

The property was added to the National Register of Historic Places in 1983.

== See also ==
- National Register of Historic Places listings in southern Westchester County, New York
