= David Williams (soldier) =

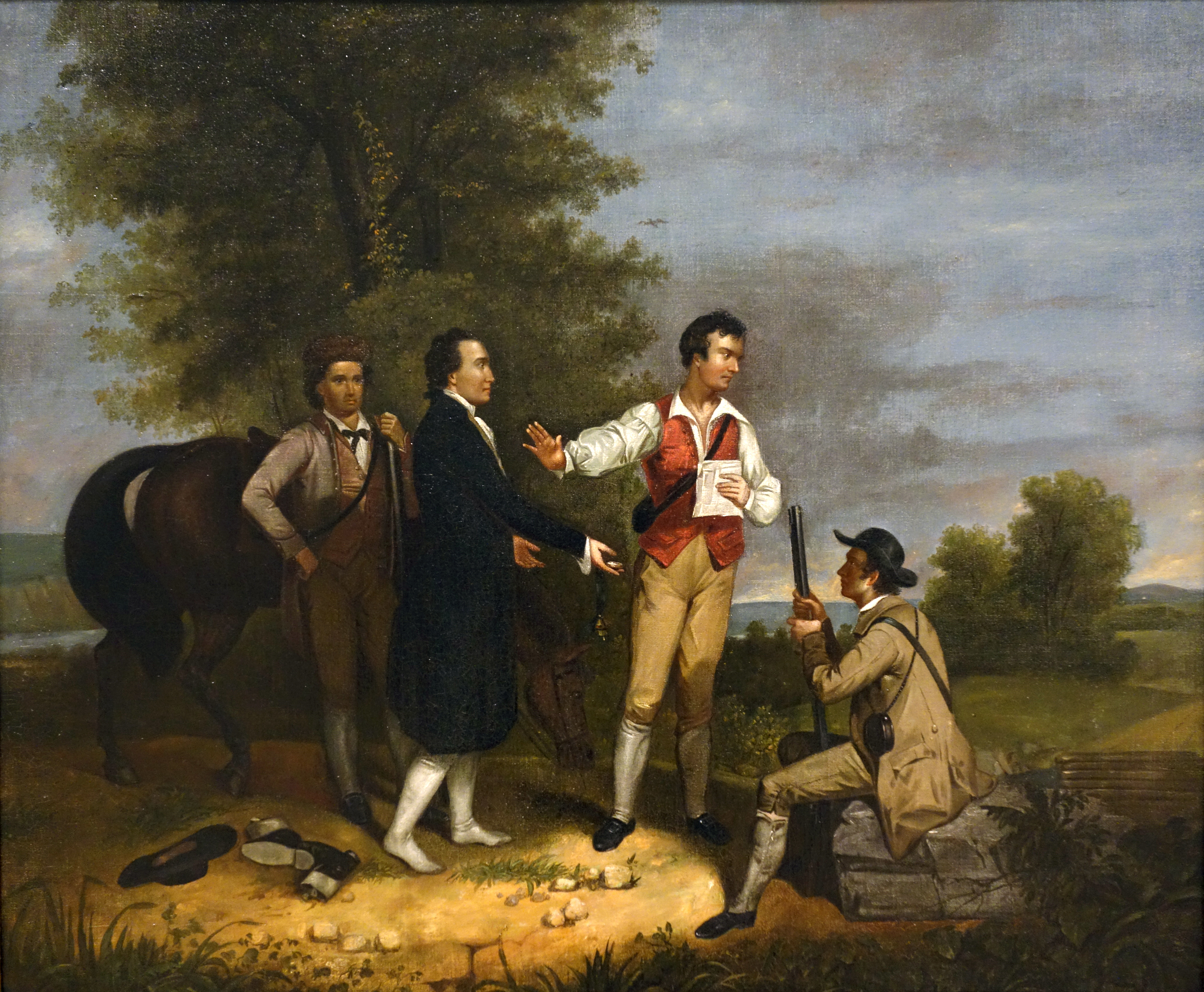
- The Capture of Major Andre, an 1833 painting by Asher Brown Durand depicting Williams detaining André
- Born: October 21, 1754; Tarrytown, New York
- Died: August 2, 1831 (aged 76) Schoharie, New York
- Branch: Army
- Service years: 1775-1783
- Known for: Being known as one of the three men to capture John André
- Conflicts: American Revolutionary War
- Awards: Fidelity Medallion

David Williams (October 21, 1754 – August 2, 1831) was a militiaman from the state of New York during the American Revolution. In 1780, he was one of three men to capture British Major John André, who

was convicted and executed as a spy for conspiring with treasonous Continental general and commandant of West Point Benedict Arnold. Williams should not be confused with, and is not related to, David Williams (1759–1836) of Massachusetts, a participant in the Boston Tea Party.

== Biography ==
Born in Tarrytown, New York, Williams had been a farmer before joining the Continental Army in 1775. Serving under Gen. Richard Montgomery, he took part in several campaigns. He was forced to leave active service in 1779 after his feet were badly frozen, leaving him partially disabled for life. Despite this condition, Williams continued to lend his support to the volunteer forces in his native area: overnight on September 22–23, 1780, he joined militiamen John Paulding and Isaac Van Wart as part of an armed patrol.

The three men seized British officer Major John André at a site in Tarrytown, now called Patriot's Park. Williams searched André and discovered, hidden inside his boots, the documents of his secret communication with Continental officer Benedict Arnold. The militiamen, all yeomen farmers, refused Andre's bribe and took the officer to Continental Army headquarters. Arnold's plans to surrender West Point to the British were revealed and foiled, and Williams was among the witnesses when André was hanged as a spy. With George Washington's personal recommendation, the United States Congress awarded Williams, Paulding and Van Wart the first military decoration of the United States, the silver medal known as the Fidelity Medallion. Each of the three also received federal pensions of $200 a year. New York State awarded them valuable farms.

The three militiamen were highly celebrated in their lifetimes: commemorations large and small abound in Westchester (see below), and can be found in many disparate parts of the early United States. Among other honors, each of the men had his name given to a county in the new state of Ohio (1803): Williams County is in the extreme northwest corner of the state.

Still, Williams and the others did see their reputations impugned by some. André at his trial had insisted the men were mere brigands; sympathy for him remained in some more aristocratic American quarters (and grew to legend in England, where he was buried in Westminster Abbey). Giving voice to this sympathy, Representative Benjamin Tallmadge of Connecticut persuaded Congress not to grant the men a requested pension increase in 1817, publicly assailing their credibility and motivations. Tallmadge, in 1780 a major, was the officer to whom André was taken after his capture, and he said he believed André's account over that of the three captors. He said Williams and the other two were "of that class of people who passed between both armies, as often in one camp as in the other." He said that "when Major André's boots were taken off by them, it was to search for plunder, and not to detect treason." He asserted that "if Andre could have given to these men the amount they demanded for his release, he never would have been hung for a spy, nor in captivity.." Despite the slight, the men's popular acclaim continued to grow throughout the 19th century to almost-mythic status. Some modern scholars interpreted the episode as a major event in early American cultural development, representing the apotheosis of the common man in the new society, even if that means both ignoring contemporary accounts of their character and actions and subsequent inflation of both during the nineteenth century.

Williams is buried in the Old Stone Fort Cemetery in Schoharie, New York, southwest of Albany. The inscription on his obelisk reads: "He with his compatriots John Paulding and Isaac VanWart on the 22nd of September 1780, arrested Major John Andre and found on his person treasonable papers in the handwriting of Gen. Benedict Arnold, who sought by treachery to surrender the military post of West Point into the hands of the enemy. In resisting the great bribes of their prisoner for his liberty, they showed their incorruptible patriotism; the American army was saved, and our beloved Country became free."

== Legacy ==
Williams is honored on the monument erected at the site of Major Andre's capture in Tarrytown, New York, on the east bank of the Hudson. The community has streets named for all three men. Three streets in nearby Elmsford, NY, are also named for them - although Williams Street was virtually eliminated in the 1960s by construction of I-287; it remains only as a short service road between the highway and Route 9A. Ohio's Williams County is also named after David Williams (see also Van Wert and Paulding Counties, also in Ohio.)
