= John Paulding =

American militiaman (1758–1818)

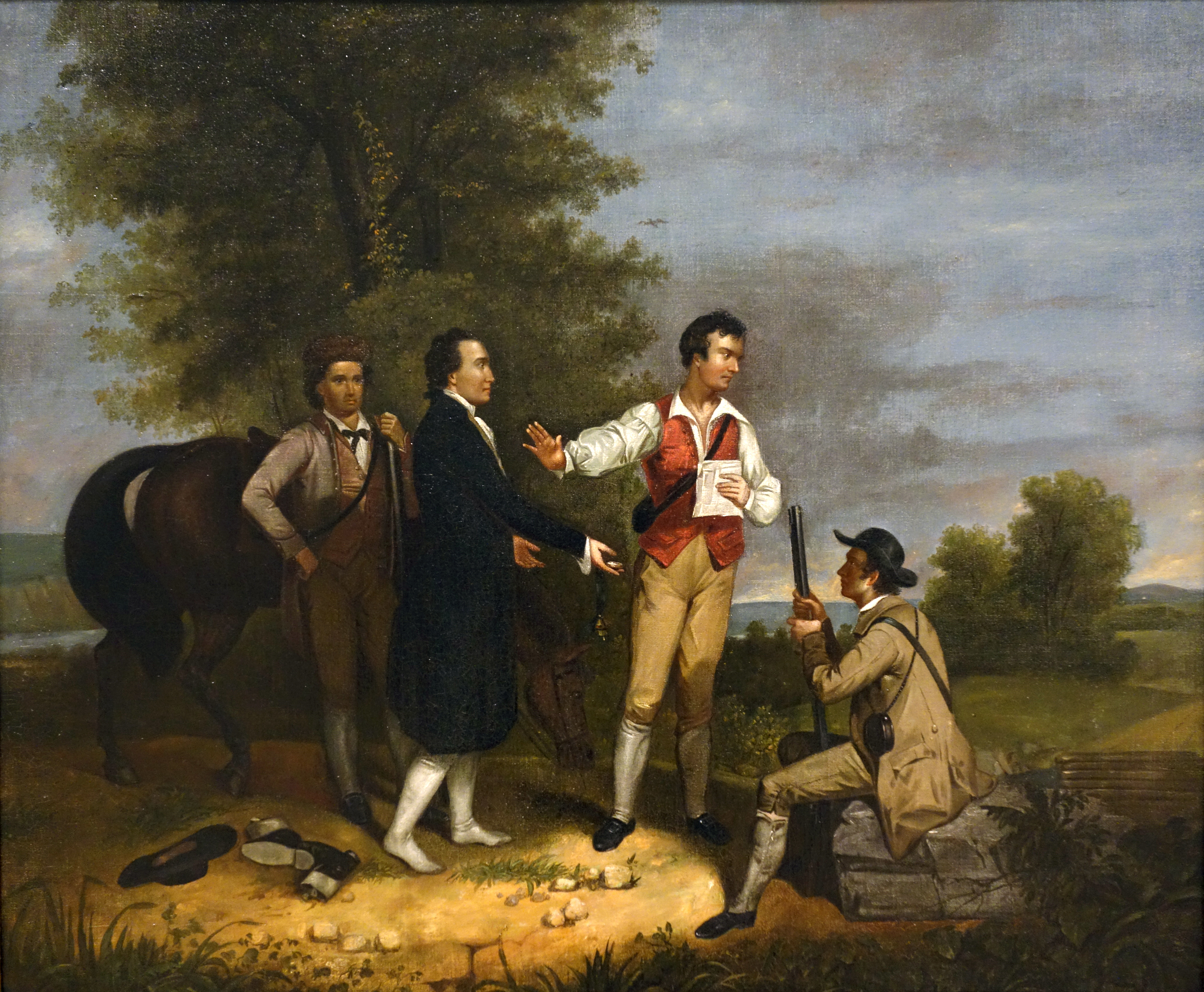
- The Capture of Major Andre, an 1833 painting by Asher Brown Durand depicting Paulding (second from right) detaining André
- Born: October 16, 1758; Peekskill, Province of New York, British America
- Died: February 18, 1818 (aged 59); Staatsburg, New York, U.S.
- Spouses: Sarah Tidd (m. 1781; died 1789) Esther Ward (m. 1790; died 1804) Hester Denike (m. 1806)
- Children: 19, including Hiram
- Parent: Joseph Paulding
- Relatives: James Kirke Paulding (cousin); William Paulding Jr. (cousin)

John Paulding (October 16, 1758 – February 18, 1818) was an American militiaman from the state of New York during the American Revolution. In 1780, he was one of three men who captured British Major John André, who associated with the treason of Continental general and commandant of West Point Benedict Arnold. Andre was convicted and hanged.

== American Revolution ==
In 1780, while visiting his future wife, Sarah Tidd, Paulding was detained by a group of Loyalists led by his future brother-in-law. He was imprisoned in the sugar house prisons in New York City, but escaped by jumping from a window. Paulding went to the livery stable of a friend and acquired a coat of a Hessian soldier, which he wore to evade notice as he made his way north to Patriot territory.

On September 23, 1780, Paulding was patrolling the Albany Post Road (today's U.S. Route 9) along with two other young militiamen, David Williams and Isaac Van Wart. They were part of a scouting party of the Westchester County Militia, commanded by Sgt. John Dean. A rider on horseback wearing civilian clothes approached, heading south toward New York; Paulding seized the reins of his horse and began to question him. The rider turned out to be British Major John André, who had left Benedict Arnold after planning Arnold's defection from the American side, and who was trying to make his way back to British lines. André, seeing Paulding's Hessian coat, may have assumed him to be a member of De Lancey's Cowboys, a Loyalist military unit which had been raiding Westchester's Neutral Ground for cattle and supplies, and he identified himself as a Loyalist.

Searching through André's clothes, the three militiamen discovered documents of his secret communication with Benedict Arnold. The militiamen, all local yeomen farmers, refused André's attempt to bribe them, and delivered the officer to the rest of their scouting party; and the group decided to take him to the Continental Army's frontline headquarters in Sands Mill, a hamlet within North Castle, New York. Arnold's plans to surrender West Point to the British were foiled, although he got wind of his exposure and before he was arrested, safely escaped to British territory. André was convicted as a spy. He was hanged on October 2, little more than a week after he was captured.

With George Washington's personal recommendation, the United States Congress awarded Paulding, Williams, and Van Wart the first military decoration of the United States, the silver medal known as the Fidelity Medallion. Each of the three also received federal pensions of $200 a year. New York State granted them each lands for farms.

The celebrated trio were commemorated far and wide as popular heroes after the patriots won the war. By an act of Congress, the new state of Ohio (1803) included the counties named Paulding, Van Wert (anglicized spelling), and Williams. Paulding was held in particularly high regard by early American historians, as the standard 19th-century accounts credited him with the decision-making and initiative at the scene.

Though hailed as national heroes, Paulding and the others also received criticism. The divisions in society continued after the war. At his trial André insisted the men were mere brigands; sympathy for Andre remained among some more elite American quarters, which included some Loyalists. (André's reputation was high in England, where his body was returned and he was buried in Westminster Abbey). Representative Benjamin Tallmadge of Connecticut, who had been present as an American officer in Westchester County in 1780 and had a low opinion of the three common militiamen, had accepted André's account of his capture and search. Tallmadge argued in Congress for the rejection of a requested pension increase in 1817 for Paulding. He assailed the credibility and motivations of the three captors.

Despite this slight, the men's popular acclaim generally increased throughout the 19th century, although opinion on their motives and actions remained divided. Some modern scholars have interpreted the episode as a major event in early American cultural development, representing the apotheosis of the "common man" in the new democratic society.

The site where Paulding and his companions captured Andre is now commemorated as Patriot's Park on the border of Tarrytown and Sleepy Hollow. The stream cutting through the park, that serves as the boundary between the two villages, is known as Andre Brook.

== Personal life ==
Paulding was born on October 16, 1758, at the Paulding homestead near Tarrytown in Peekskill in the Province of New York in what was then British America. He was the son of Joseph Paulding.

Paulding was a self-sufficient yeoman farmer and was described as a strong, sturdy man, standing more than six feet tall, unusual for the era. Paulding married three times in his life, and lost two wives to death. In total he had nineteen children by them. On April 21, 1781, he was married to Sarah Tidd (1767–1789) of Salem, New York.

After Sarah's death on October 23, 1789, he remarried to Esther Ward (1768–1804) on November 18, 1790. Esther was the daughter of Caleb Ward and Mary (née Drake) Ward. Together, they were the parents of:

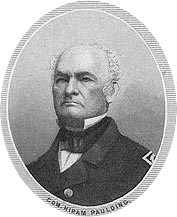
Hiram Paulding

- Hiram Paulding (1797–1878), a Rear Admiral in the United States Navy, who served from the War of 1812 until after the Civil War

Esther died in 1804 and in 1806, he married for the third time to Hester Denike (d. 1855), the daughter of Isaac Denike of Peekskill.

Paulding died in 1818 at Staatsburg, Dutchess County, New York of natural causes. His last words were reported to be: "I die a true republican." A lifelong resident and prominent figure of the area, he was buried in the cemetery of Old St. Peter's Church in Van Cortlandtville, Cortlandt Manor.

=== Descendants ===
Paulding's descendants are numerous but perhaps the best-known of them is his son Hiram Paulding (b.1797 - d.1878), who served in the War of 1812 and fought in the Battle of Lake Champlain; he rose to become a Rear Admiral in the United States Navy and retired only after the end of the American Civil War.

=== Relations ===
Among his extended family were cousins James Kirke Paulding, the U.S. Secretary of the Navy under President Martin Van Buren; William Paulding Jr., who served as mayor of New York City, a U.S. Representative and the Adjutant General of New York; and Julia Paulding, who married U.S. Representative William Irving (brother of author and diplomat Washington Irving).

== Legacy ==
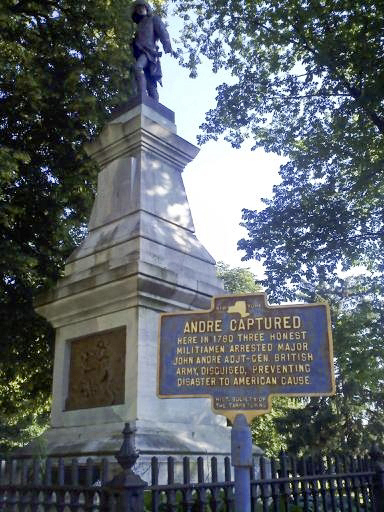
Memorial at Patriots Park, Tarrytown, NY

Paulding's grave is marked by a large marble monument with the epitaph:

FIDELITY - On the morning of the 23rd of September 1780, accompanied by two young farmers of the county of West Chester, he intercepted the British spy, André. Poor himself, he disdained to acquire wealth by the sacrifice of his country. Rejecting the temptation of great rewards, he conveyed his prisoner to the American camp and, by this noble act of self-denial, the treason of Arnold was detected; the designs of the enemy baffled; West Point and the American Army saved; and these United States, now by the grace of God Free and Independent, rescued from most imminent peril.

The monument was erected in 1827 by the City of New York. In 2017, a new bronze plaque was dedicated at his gravesite to clarify the original, weathered text of the monument.

In 1853, a monument was erected at the site of André's capture in Tarrytown. On the event's centenary in 1880, it was topped with the statue of a minuteman. Carved by the sculptor William Rudolf O'Donovan (1844–1920), the statue is reputedly in the likeness of Paulding himself. It is located in Patriot's Park, which was added to the National Register of Historic Places in 1982. A street called Paulding Drive in Chappaqua, New York was named in his honor.

According to Marcius D. Raymond, several villages and counties are named in his honor: Paulding County, Ohio; Paulding County, Georgia; Paulding, Michigan (site of the mysterious Paulding Light); Paulding, New Jersey; and Paulding, Mississippi. Additionally, the villages of Tarrytown (where there is a John Paulding Elementary School), Cold Spring and Elmsford, along with the cities of Peekskill and White Plains, all in New York, each have a street named for Paulding (as well as ones for Williams and Van Wart). The Fire Department of Sparkill, New York, maintains the John Paulding Engine Co., founded in 1901.
