= Fidelity Medallion =

United States military decoration

- Type: Military medallion
- Awarded for: Participation in the capture of Major John André
- Presented by: United States Armed Forces
- Campaign: American Revolutionary War
- Status: Obsolete, awarded for specific event
- First award: 1780
- Final award: 1780

Highlights
- Total: 3
- Total awarded posthumously: No

The Fidelity Medallion is the oldest decoration of the United States military and was created by act of the Continental Congress in 1780. Also known as the "André Capture Medal", the Fidelity Medallion was awarded to those soldiers who participated in the capture of Major John André, of the British Army, who had been the contact to Benedict Arnold and had helped organize his defection.

Historical records indicate that three soldiers, all members of the militia of New York state, were awarded the Fidelity Medallion after its first issuance: Private John Paulding, Private David Williams, and Private Isaac Van Wart.

The obverse of the medallion was inscribed "Fidelity"; the reverse, with the motto, "Amor Patriæ Vincit", which means, "The love of country conquers."

The Fidelity Medallion was never again bestowed and it quickly became regarded as a commemorative decoration. For this reason, the Badge of Military Merit is generally considered the first decoration of the U.S. military, even though it was created two years after the Fidelity Medallion, in 1782.

== Authorizing statute ==
Whereas, Congress have received information that John Paulding, David Williams, and Isaac Van Wart, three young volunteer militiamen of the State of New York, did, on the 23d day of September last, intercept Major John André, adjutant-general of the British Army, on his return from the American lines, in the character of a spy; and, notwithstanding the large bribes offered them for his release, nobly disdaining to sacrifice their country for the sake of gold, secured and conveyed him to the commanding officer of the district, whereby the dangerous and traitorous conspiracy of Benedict Arnold was brought to light, the insidious designs of the enemy baffled, and the United States rescued from impending danger:

Resolved, That Congress have a high sense of the virtuous and patriotic conduct of the said John Paulding, David Williams, and Isaac Van Wart. In testimony whereof,

Ordered, That each of them receive annually, out of the public treasury, 200 dollars in specie, or an equivalent in the current money of these States, during life; and that the Board of War procure for each of them a silver medal, on one side of which shall be a shield with this inscription: "Fidelity," and on the other the following motto: "Vincit amor patriæ," and forward them to the commander-in-chief, who is requested to present the same, with a copy of this resolution, and the thanks of Congress for their fidelity, and the eminent service they have rendered their country.

Friday, November 3, 1780.

== Disposition of the three Medallions ==
All three of the original Medallions were thought to be lost. Isaac Van Wart's example was thought to be lost at the time of his death in 1828, but was actually in the hands of a descendant in Westchester County, NY, until it was donated to the New York State Museum in 2023. John Paulding's and David Williams' medallions were both donated to the New-York Historical Society in 1905 which displayed them in a locked, glass-topped case. In mid-1975, the two Medallions were stolen, along with the pocket watch originally belonging to Major John André. The Historical Society did not go public with the loss at the time, and none of the items have been recovered.

== Replicas ==
In the two centuries since the original Fidelity Medallions were issued, replicas have occasionally been produced in metals including silver, pewter, lead and bronze and in varying degrees of historical accuracy. The American Numismatic Society has seven different specimens in their collection.

An auction catalog, published for a September 2012 sale which featured a replica of the award, includes a description of the Fidelity Medallion:

[...] Fidelity Medallion, the oldest decoration of the United States military and created by act of the Continental Congress in 1780. It is also referred to as "André Capture Medal" as historical records indicate that it was awarded to three soldiers from the New York Militia, David Williams, John Paulding and Isaac Van Wert, who aided in the arrest of Major John André for his role in organizing Benedict Arnold's defection to the British Army. The medal is 55 mm × 41 mm, beautifully struck. The face of the medallion contains the inscription "FIDELITY" and the reverse "AMOR PATRIÆ VINCIT" ("The love of country conquers").

At the time, the medal did not sell.
