= Isaac Van Wart =

American militiaman

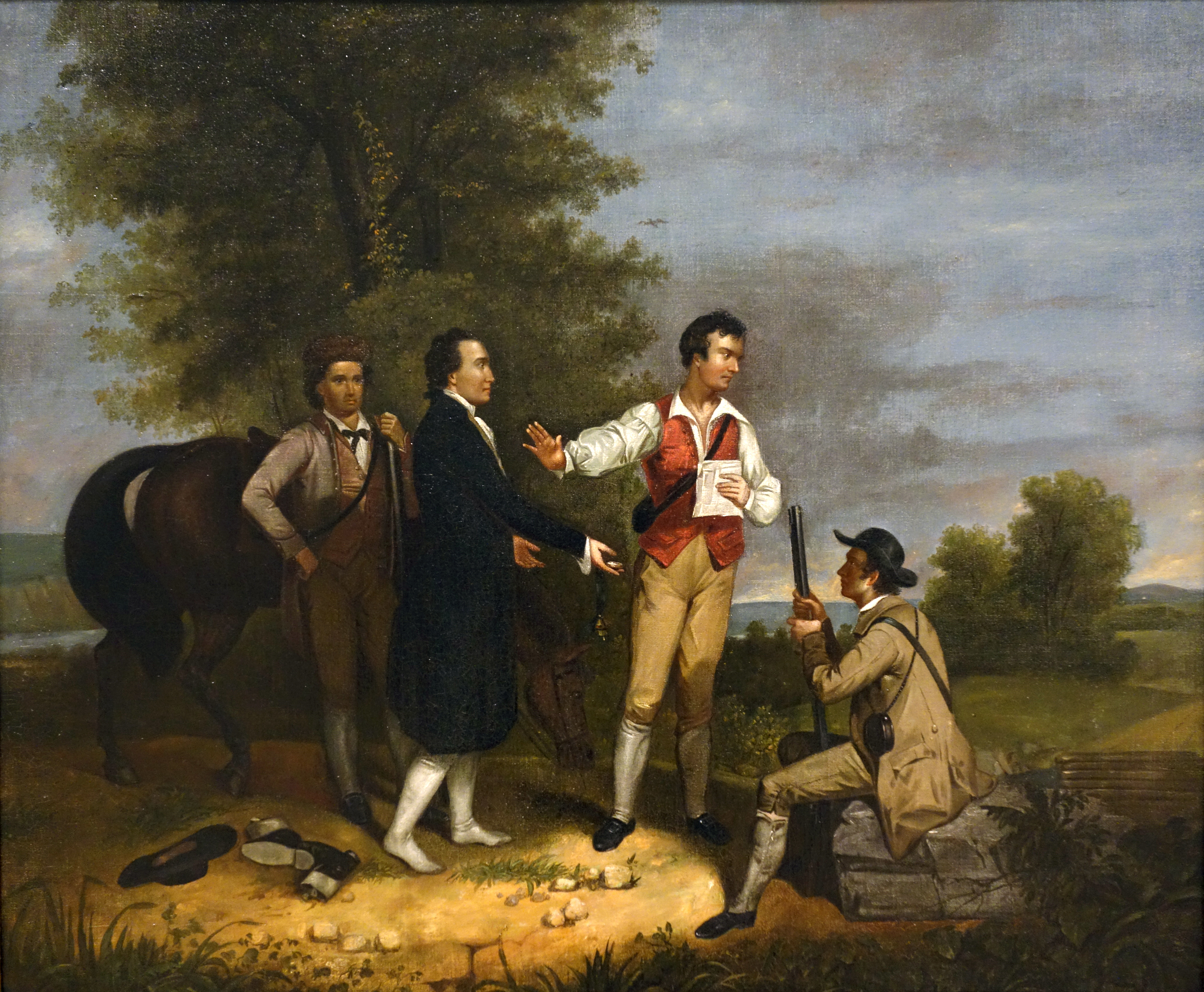
- The Capture of Major Andre, an 1833 painting by Asher Brown Durand depicting Van Wart at André's arrest
- Born: October 25, 1762; Greenburgh, New York
- Died: May 23, 1828 (age 65); Elmsford, New York
- Occupation: Militiaman
- Spouse: Rachel Storm (1760–1834)

Isaac Van Wart (October 25, 1762 – May 23, 1828) was an American militiaman from the state of New York during the American Revolution. In 1780, he was one of three men who captured British Major John André, who was executed as a spy by the Americans for conspiring with treasonous Continental Army general and commandant of West Point Benedict Arnold.

== American Revolution ==
A yeoman farmer, Van Wart joined the volunteer militia when New York was a battle zone of the American Revolution. Overnight on 22–23 September 1780, he joined John Paulding and David Williams in an armed patrol of the area. The three men seized a traveling British officer, Major John André, in Tarrytown, New York, at a site now called Patriot's Park. Holding him in custody, they discovered documents of André's secret communication with Benedict Arnold. The militiamen, all yeomen farmers, refused André's considerable bribe and delivered him to Continental Army headquarters. Arnold's plans to surrender West Point to the British were revealed and foiled, and André was hanged as a spy. With George Washington's personal recommendation, the United States Congress awarded Van Wart, Paulding and Williams the first military decoration of the United States, the silver medal known as the Fidelity Medallion. Each of the three also received federal pensions of $200 a year, and prestigious farms awarded by New York State.

== Personal life ==
Van Wart was born in the farm country of Greenburgh, New York, near the village of Elmsford. He lived on the frontier and his birthdate is not recorded.

Van Wart married Rachel Storm (1760–1834), a daughter of Elmsford's most prominent family (from whom the settlement's original name, "Storm's Bridge", was derived). He divided his time between his family, his farm, and his church (he became an elder deacon of the Dutch Reformed Church). Van Wart died in Elmsford on May 23, 1828, and is buried in the cemetery of the Elmsford Reformed Church. He was a vestryman of that church for many years and sang in its choir. His imposing monument has dominated the small cemetery ever since it was erected by "The Citizens of the County of Westchester" in 1829. His tombstone said that he died at the age of sixty-nine.

== Legacy ==
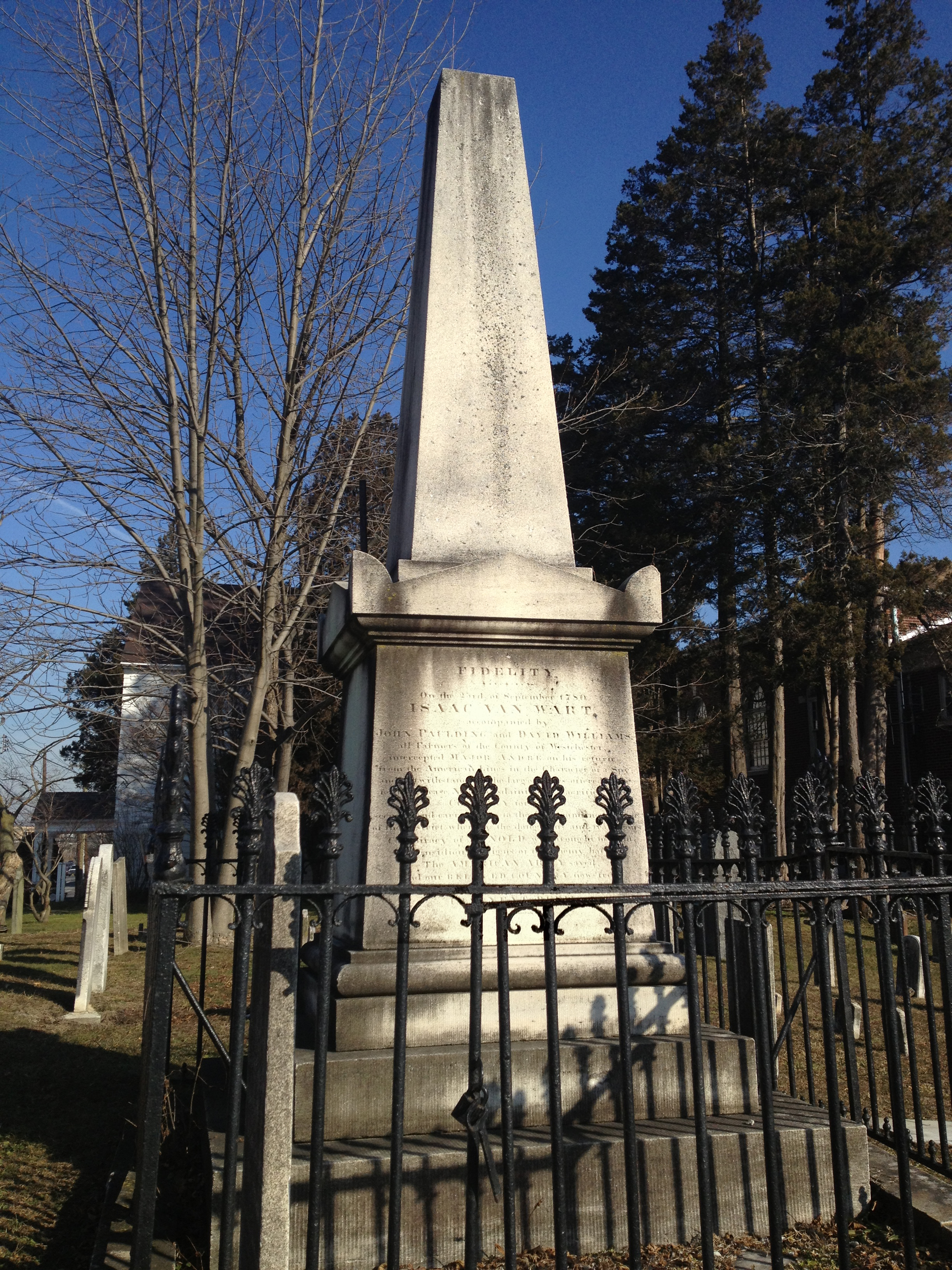
Van Wart's grave obelisk at the Elmsford Reformed Church and Cemetery

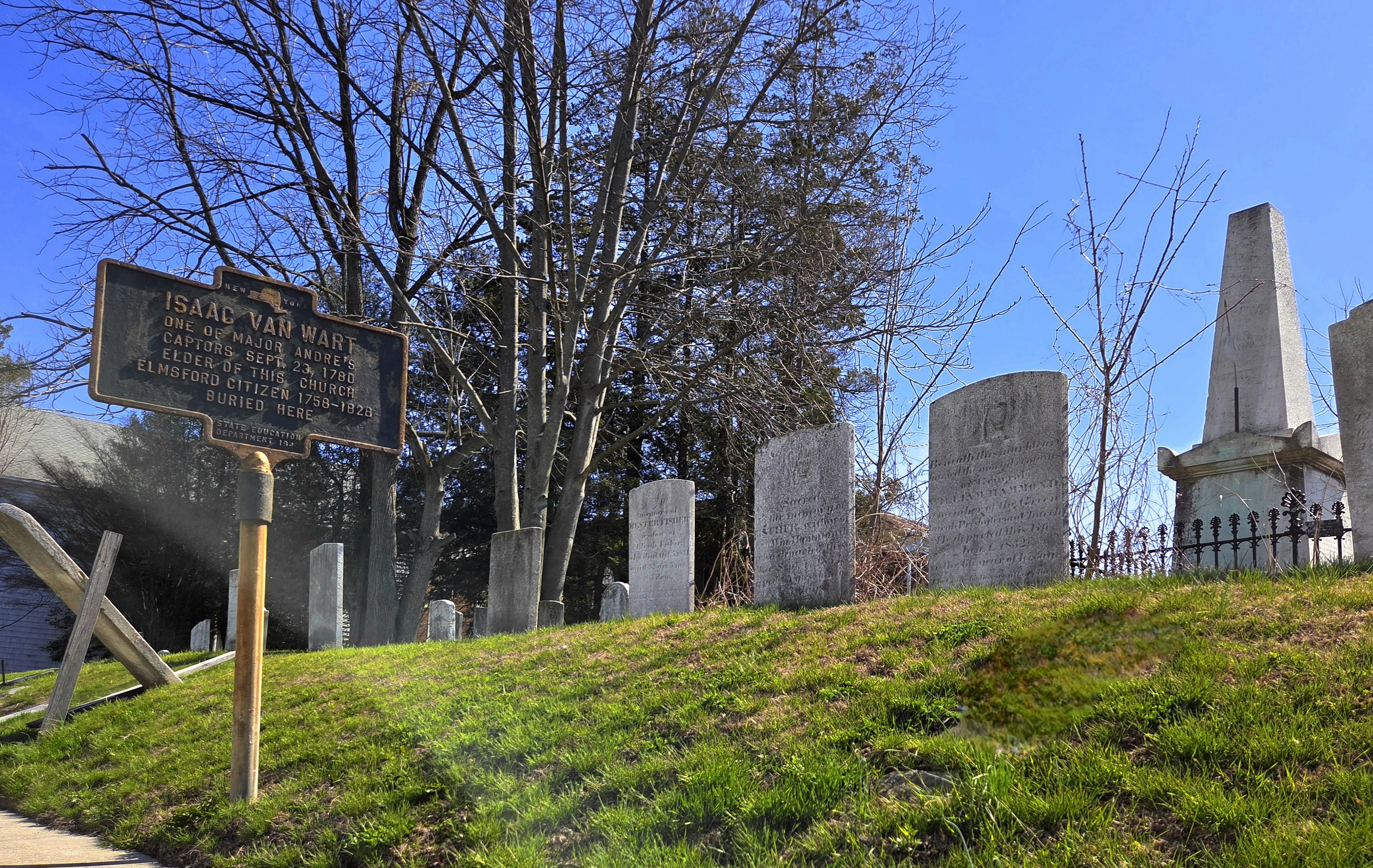
Van Wart's grave (far right) and historical marker near the cemetery

A marble and granite monument was erected at his grave on June 11, 1829; it bears the single emphatic word "FIDELITY", followed by this epitaph,

On the 23rd of September 1780, Isaac Van Wart, accompanied by John Paulding and David Williams, all Farmers of the County of Westchester, intercepted Major André, on his return from the American Lines in the character of a Spy, and notwithstanding the large bribes offered them for his release, nobly disdaining to sacrifice their Country for Gold, Secured and carried him to the Commanding Officer of the district, whereby the dangerous and traitorous Conspiracy of Arnold was brought to light; the insidious designs of the enemy baffled; the American Army saved; and our beloved country now free and Independent, rescued from most imminent peril.

The three militiamen were highly celebrated in their lifetimes: commemorations large and small abound in Westchester, and can be found in many disparate parts of the early United States. Among other honors, each of the men had his name given to a county in the new state of Ohio (1803), each along its western border: Van Wert County bears a common alternate spelling of the name. Adjacent Paulding County is located north of Van Wert County. Williams County is in the northwest corner of the state, separated from Paulding County by Defiance County.

Still, Van Wart and the others did see their reputations impugned by some. André at his trial had insisted the men were mere brigands; sympathy for him remained in some more aristocratic American quarters (and grew to legend in England, where he was buried in Westminster Abbey). Giving voice to this sympathy, Representative Benjamin Tallmadge of Connecticut persuaded Congress to deny the men a requested pension increase in 1817, publicly assailing their credibility and motivations. Despite the slight, the men's popular acclaim continued to grow throughout the 19th century to almost mythic status. Some modern scholars have interpreted the episode as a major event in early American cultural development, representing the apotheosis of the common man in the new democratic society.

Van Wart and his companions are honored on the monument erected at the site of the capture in Tarrytown, dedicated on June 11, 1829, by the Revolutionary general and congressman Aaron Ward of nearby Ossining. A Van Wart Avenue is located on the south side of Tarrytown, near the Tappan Zee Bridge. Three streets in the neighboring village of Elmsford, New York, are named for the militiamen, with Van Wart Street being one of the village's main roads. White Plains, New York, has a Van Wart Avenue in the southwest section of the city, off NY Route 22.
