= Henry Peck =

Henry Peck may refer to:

- Henry E. Peck (1821–1867), professor, abolitionist, and diplomat from Ohio
- Henry Peck (British Army officer) (1874–1965)
- Henry "Hennery" Peck, fictional character commonly known as Peck's Bad Boy
- Henry Peck (MP) for Chichester (UK Parliament constituency)
- Henry W. Peck of 2nd Wisconsin Volunteer Infantry Regiment
- Henry M. Peck House, a historic home in West Haverstraw, Rockland County, New York

== See also ==
- Harry Thurston Peck, American classical scholar, author, editor, and critic
