= Udney Hay =

American politician

- Born: 1739; Scotland
- Died: September 6, 1806 (aged 66–67); Burlington, Vermont
- Burial place: North Underhill Cemetery, Underhill, Vermont
- Military career
- Allegiance: United States
- Branch: Continental Army
- Rank: Lieutenant Colonel

Udney Hay (also spelled Udny) (1739 – September 6, 1806) was an American deputy quartermaster general during the American Revolutionary War. He was later a politician in Vermont.

He was born in Scotland in 1739. In 1775–76, before his war service, he was a timber merchant living in Quebec and sustained financial losses supporting the revolution.

== Military service ==
In January 1776, he joined the 2nd Canadian Regiment of Colonel Moses Hazen. In June, Brigadier General John Sullivan assigned him to take on the duties of deputy quartermaster general from Donald Campbell. On January 9, 1777, as recommended by General Horatio Gates, the Continental Congress appointed him lieutenant colonel and assistant deputy quartermaster general at Fort Ticonderoga.

After the resignation of Thomas Mifflin, the first quartermaster general, George Washington highly recommended Hay on January 1, 1778, to Henry Laurens, president of the Congress, noting that his generals thought him the "best qualified of any man upon the Continent for the office." However, Congress did not agree, and instead appointed Nathanael Greene quartermaster general on March 2.

On April 15, 1780, his brother, Charles Hay, was arrested by Frederick Haldimand, the governor of the Province of Quebec, and not released until May 2, 1783. Udney wrote to Washington to provide a character reference for his case in London.

On June 24, 1780, Hay was appointed by George Clinton, the first governor of New York, as the state agent to supply provisions for the Continental Army.

In 1780, he purchased a house from Hugh Van Kleeck, now called Clinton House, in Poughkeepsie, New York. In 1783, the house was destroyed by fire and he rented the nearby Glebe House. To assist in rebuilding the house, he requested permission from Washington for army craftsmen, which was received.

== Public service ==
In 1796, Hay moved to Underhill, Vermont, and entered public life. From 1798 to 1804, he represented the town in the state assembly. In 1802, he lost the election for the United States House of Representatives as a Democratic-Republican candidate on the third ballot to Martin Chittenden. He was a member of the Vermont Council of Censors chosen in 1806.

== Private life ==
Hay had one child, a daughter, Jane Hay, born January 23, 1778, in Albany, New York. She married Reuben C. Hyde and they had seven children. A son, Udney Hay Hyde (1808–1883), became a conductor on the Underground Railroad in Mechanicsburg, Ohio.

In 1794, Hay was in Burlington, Vermont at the time of Lord Dorchester's Speech to the "Seven Villages or Nations of lower Canada." Hay enclosed a copy of speech to Governor George Clinton of New York, which was forwarded directly to George Washington to report on British activities. Dorchester's speech was viewed by many as a potential war provocation from Britain and one of the factors leading up to the Jay Treaty negotiations. During the same year, the Democratic Republican Society of Chittenden County was founded in Burlington, allegedly by Udney Hay. In a published open letter to Alexander Hamilton, Vermont Federalist Nathaniel Chipman derided the formation of the society and the citation of his work to justify its founding:

You have, undoubtedly, noticed the proceedings of the Democratic Society in the county of Chittenden, in this state. I find they have been published with great avidity in New York and Philadelphia. The founder of that society, and sole author of their late proceedings [Udney Hay], perhaps you are apprized, is not an inhabitant of this state, but resides, generally in the city of New York. What could have induced that gentleman to call in the aid of my name or my writings, in support of such proceedings, is best known to himself. If you have not read the work from which the quotations are made, you might be led, from the detached sentences there cited, to believe that it contains the principles of anarchy instead of the principles of government—principles wholly subversive of a representative democracy…

In 1795, Hay served as a second for Commodore James Nicholson in New York during the lead-up to a proposed duel between Nicholson and Alexander Hamilton. The dispute was resolved through negotiation between Hamilton's and Nicholson's seconds.

Hay died on September 6, 1806, in Burlington, Vermont.

== See also ==
- Ann Hawkes Hay – Also known as Col. Hay during the American Revolutionary War in the New York area
- United States House of Representatives elections, 1802 – Vermont, third ballot
