= Clinton House (Poughkeepsie, New York) =

Historic house in New York, United States

- U.S. National Register of Historic Places
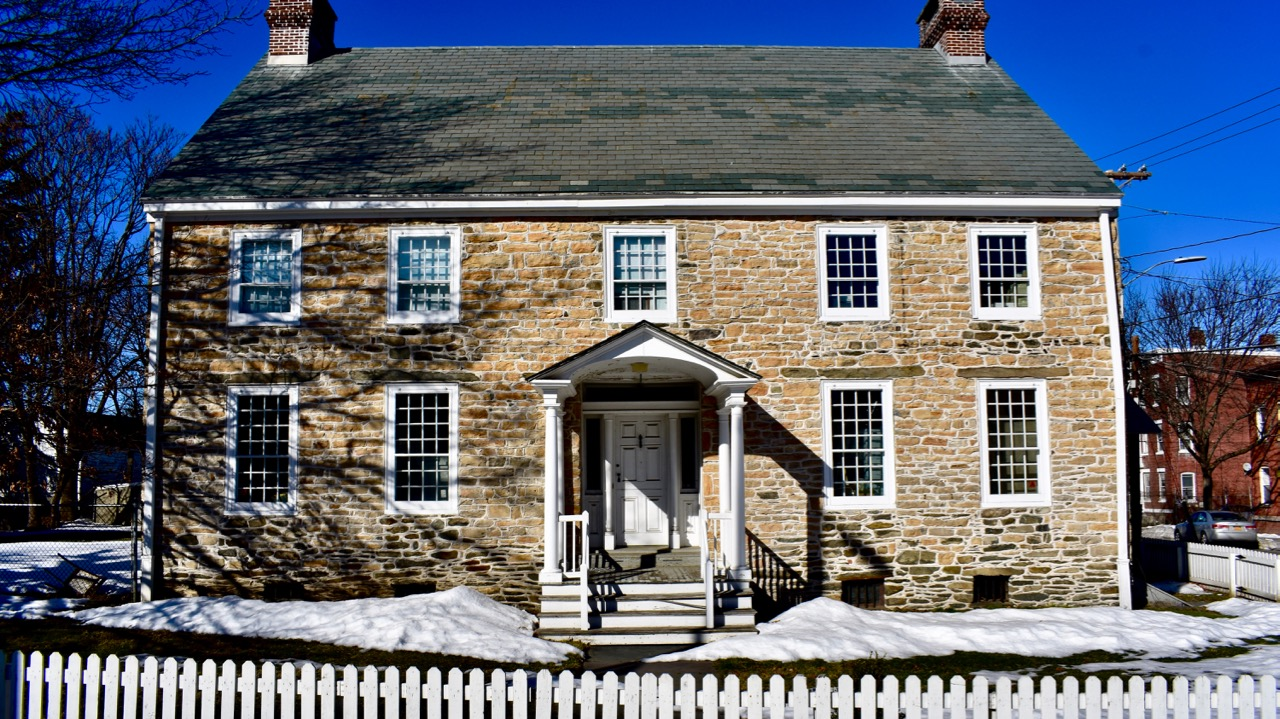
- Clinton House in March 2017

- Location within New York Location within the United States
- Location: 549 Main Street, Poughkeepsie, New York
- Coordinates: 41°42′0.94″N 73°54′58.26″W
- Area: less than one acre
- Built: 1765
- Architectural style: Georgian
- MPS: Poughkeepsie MRA
- NRHP reference No.: 82001128
- Added to NRHP: November 26, 1982

The Clinton House is an 18th-century Georgian stone building in the city of Poughkeepsie, Dutchess County, New York, United States. It is a New York State Historic Site and has been listed in the National Register of Historic Places as a historic place of local significance since 1982. The house was named for George Clinton, who served as the first Governor of New York and fourth Vice-President of the United States. He was believed to have lived there after the American Revolutionary War, but it is now known that it was never his residence.

The house probably served as a meeting place for legislators during the time Poughkeepsie was capital of New York in 1777.

Clinton House was built around 1765 by Clear Everitt, who was sheriff of the county from 1754 to 1761, on land that had belonged to Hugh van Kleeck (born about 1745, died after 1810) who owned about 20 hectares of land south of Main Street where the house stands. (The Van Kleeck House built in 1702 was demolished in 1836.) In 1780, the house was purchased by Udney Hay, who belonged to Quartermaster Corp of the Continental Army. In 1783, the house was destroyed by fire and Hay rented the nearby Glebe House. When his house was damaged by fire, Hay petitioned George Washington for craftsmen from the army to assist in its repair. However, Hay lost the house in 1786 when it was seized for debt.

In 1900, the house had fallen into disrepair and it was purchased by the Daughters of the American Revolution, who presented it to the then Governor of New York Theodore Roosevelt for the citizens of the State of New York.

It was listed on the National Register of Historic Places in 1982.

Today, the Clinton house is used for the offices and library of the Dutchess County Historical Society, with one room still set aside for use by the Mahwenawasigh Chapter of the Daughters of the American Revolution.

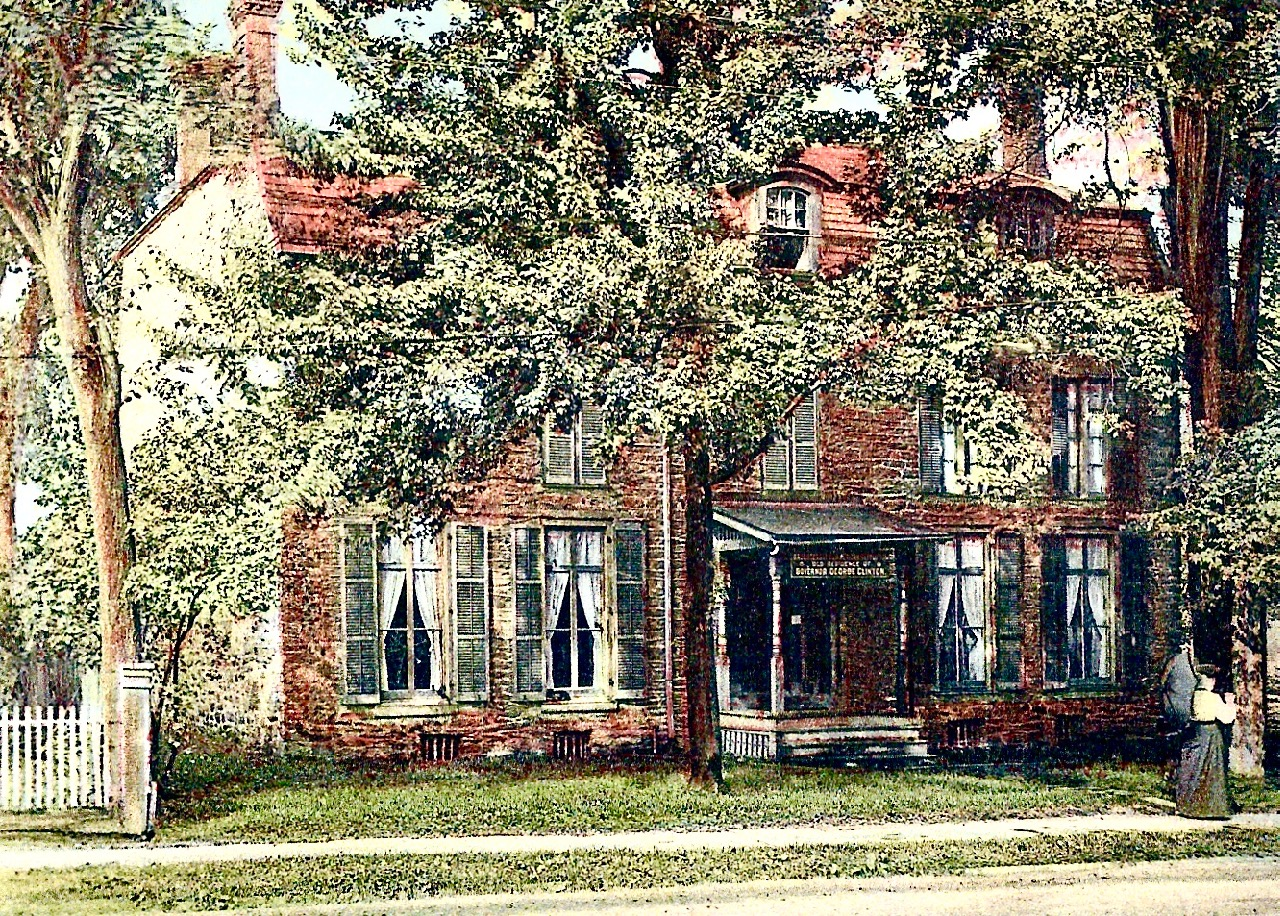
Clinton House Poughkeepsie c 1906

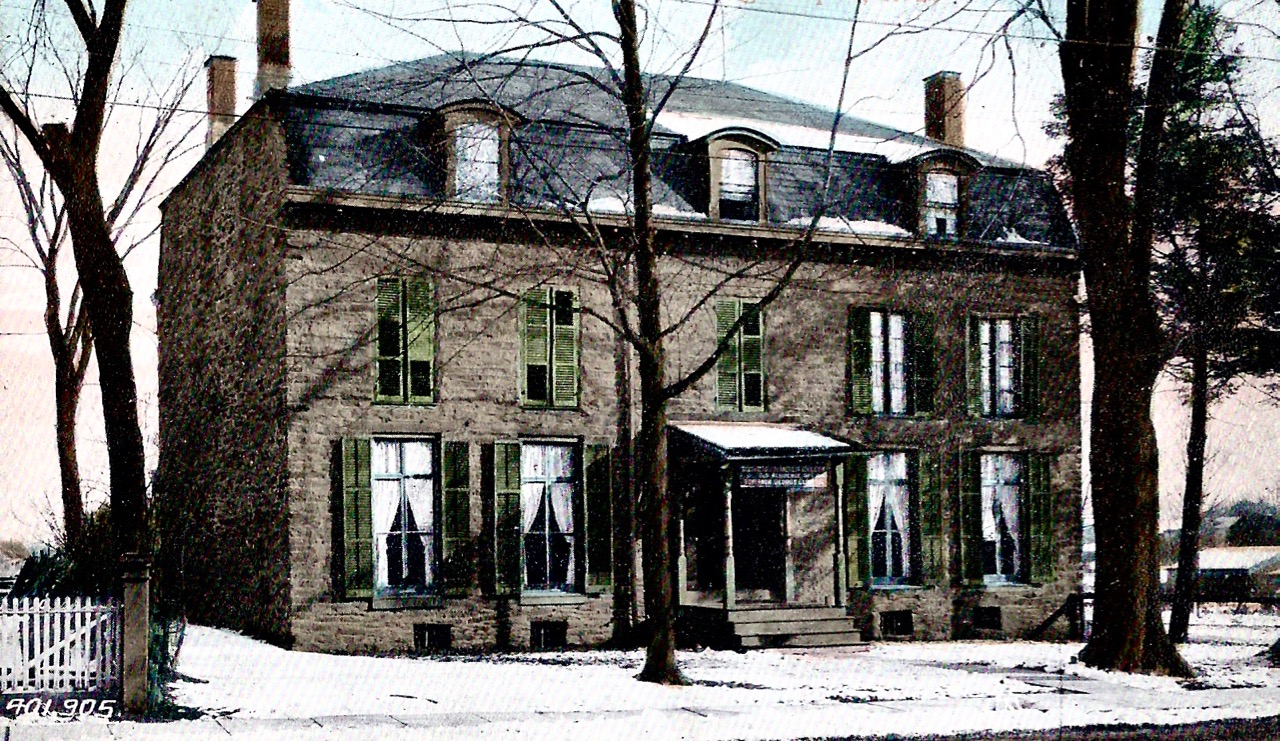
Clinton House Poughkeepsie c 1908

== See also ==
- List of New York State Historic Sites
