= William Smith (judge, born 1728) =

American judge

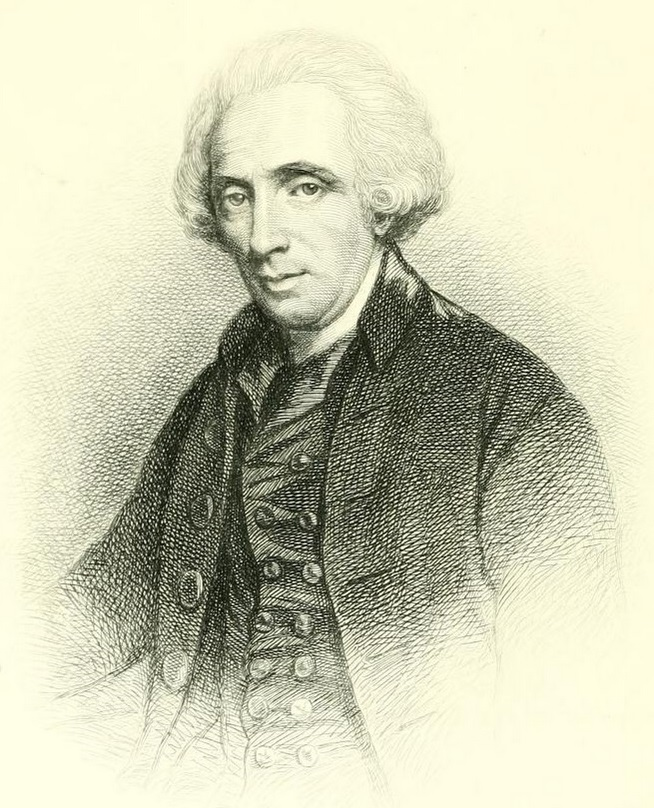

Member of Legislative Council of Lower Canada

Chief Justice of Lower Canada
- In office 1786–1793
- Preceded by: Peter Livius
- Succeeded by: William Osgoode

Personal details
- Born: June 18, 1728 New York City, Province of New York
- Died: December 6, 1793 (aged 65) Quebec City, Lower Canada
- Resting place: Mount Hermon Cemetery, Sillery
- Profession: Attorney

William Smith (18 June 1728 – 6 December 1793) was a lawyer, historian, speaker, loyalist, and eventually the loyalist Chief Justice of the Province of New York from 1780 to 1782 and Chief Justice of the Province of Quebec from 1786, later Lower Canada, from 1791 until his death.

== Early life ==
Born in New York City on June 18, 1728, he was the son of Judge William Smith. His brother, Joshua Hett Smith was notable as the supposed "dupe" of Benedict Arnold and Major John André when they collaborated during the American Revolution. Smith graduated from Yale University in 1745, studied law with William Livingston, and was admitted to the bar in 1750.

=== Family ===
His brother, Doctor Thomas Smith, was the owner of the "treason house" in West Haverstraw, Rockland County, New York that was being occupied by his other brother, Joshua Hett Smith, at the time that Benedict Arnold and Major John André planned their conspiracies during the American Revolution.

== Career ==
During the American Revolution, he was referred to as "the weathercock" because his contemporaries were not able to understand which side he was on. Basically, though, he was neither friend to Revolutionary nor Loyalist and was one of the main reasons that the loyalists themselves declared that they did never trust the family of Smith. In 1752, along with William Livingston and John Morin Scott he founded a weekly journal, the Independent Reflector.

He and his brother Joshua Hett Smith escaped prosecution and probable execution by the Commission for Detecting and Defeating Conspiracies in the State of New York in 1778 for the crime of treason due to the memory of their father's influence upon the Justice system: the elder William Smith had, despite the efforts of friends and relatives, refused appointment to the Office of Chief Justice of the Province of New York in 1760, which his son William then accepted.

In 1776, he moved to Albany to avoid the contentious politics but in 1778 declared his allegiance for the loyalist cause and joined the British in New York City. Smith was escorted across the lines by Aaron Burr and became an important adviser and confidant of the military and civilian officials including both Governor William Tryon and General Sir Henry Clinton. In 1780, he was appointed Chief Judge of New York but by this time the office only related to the small part of the Province that was still in British hands. The real judicial power was held by Daniel Horsmanden.

He published the first history of New York, The History of the Province of New-York, from the First Discovery to the Year M.DCC.XXXIII. To which is annexed, A Description of the Country, with a short Account of the Inhabitants, their Trade, Religious and Political State, and the Constitution of the Courts of Justice in the Colony. in 1757 (London: Thomas Wilcox).

Smith returned to England in 1783 and then came to Quebec City in 1786, when he was named Chief Justice for the province and also named to the legislative council. In 1791, he became chief justice for Lower Canada and was appointed to the Legislative Council of Lower Canada, serving as its first speaker.

== Personal life ==
He married Janet Livingston, of the Livingston family of New York.

In 1770, he built a manor house in West Haverstraw, New York. From July 15 to July 18, 1778, while his sister Martha and her husband Col. Ann Hawkes Hay were living in the house, it served as headquarters for General George Washington. The house burned down c. 1808–1809 and the Fraser-Hoyer House later built on the site.

He died in Quebec City in 1793. He was buried at Mount Hermon Cemetery in Sillery. Smith's diary and selected papers were compiled and edited in two volumes by L.F.S. Upton in 1963 as part of the Champlain Society's General Series.

== See also ==
- James Brown
- List of Washington's Headquarters during the Revolutionary War
