= Fraser-Hoyer House =

Historic house in New York, United States

- U.S. National Register of Historic Places
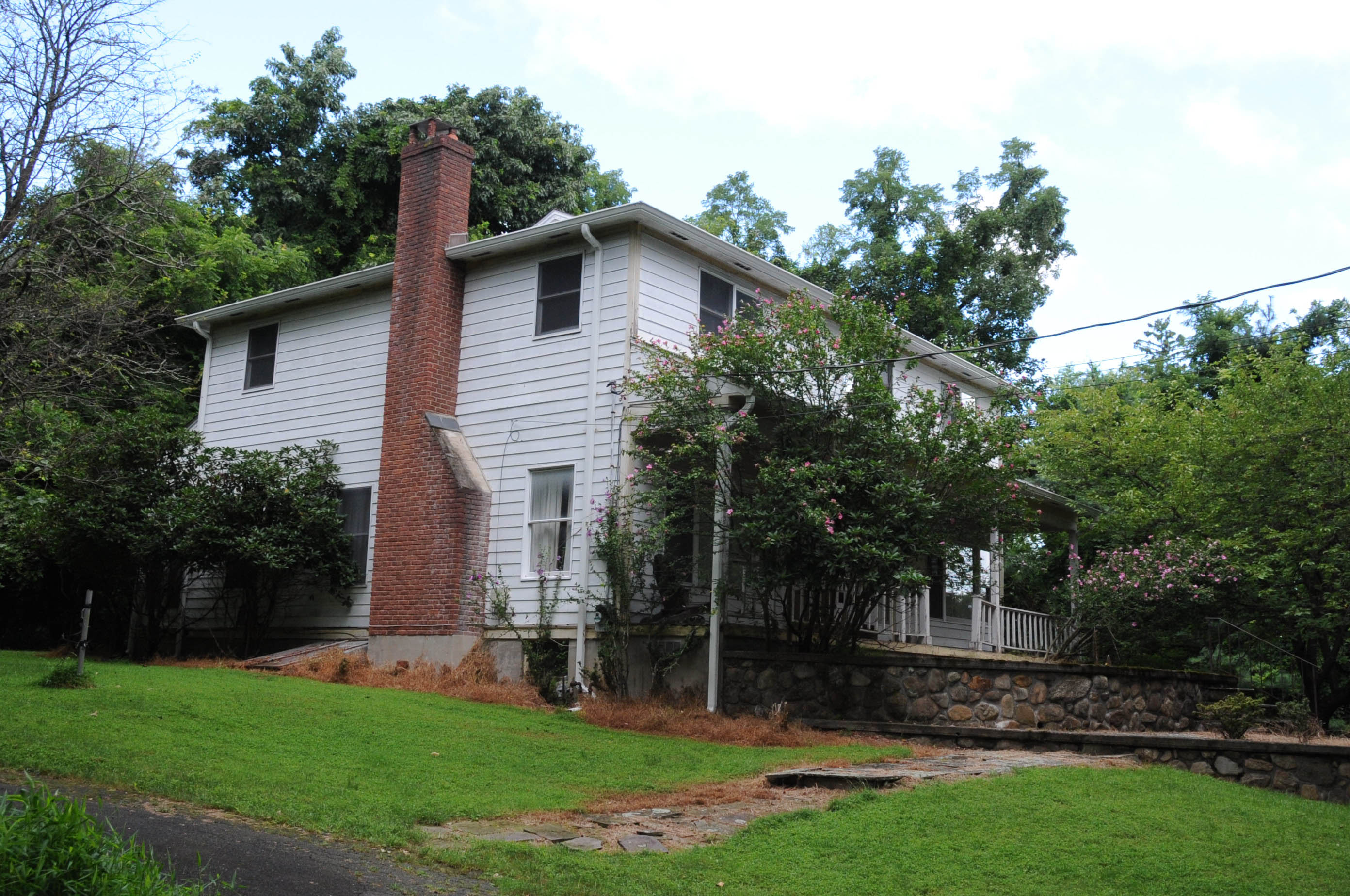

- Location within New York Location within the United States
- Location: Treason Hill off U.S. 9W, West Haverstraw, New York
- Coordinates: 41°12′41″N 73°59′17″W
- Area: 9.5 acres (3.8 ha)
- Built: ca. 1812
- Architectural style: Federal
- NRHP reference No.: 76001270
- Added to NRHP: April 22, 1976

Fraser-Hoyer House is a historic home located at West Haverstraw in Rockland County, New York. It was built about 1812 and is a two-story, five-bay, rectangular frame dwelling with a hipped roof and stone foundation. It features Federal style details.

The house of William Smith had been built previously on this site in 1770.

It was listed on the National Register of Historic Places in 1976.
