= Ann Hawkes Hay =

- Born: August 14, 1745; Kingston, Jamaica
- Died: April 18, 1785 (aged 39); New York City, New York
- Military career
- Allegiance: United States
- Rank: Colonel

Ann Hawkes Hay (August 14, 1745 – April 18, 1785) was an American officer during the American Revolutionary War. He was born on August 14, 1745, in Kingston, Jamaica, the only child of Michael Hay from Edinburgh, Scotland and Esther Wilkins. He was named after his great-aunt, Ann Mister, sister of Martin Wilkes, father of his mother.

== Military service ==
Hay was a colonel in the 2nd regiment of the Orange County, New York militia and observed enemy operations in the Haverstraw Bay of the Hudson River. On July 25, 1776, he reported to General George Washington about the actions of HMS Phoenix and HMS Rose in the bay. Another example was on March 23, 1777, when he reported about enemy operations against Peekskill, New York. Later, in the fall of 1777, his house and farm buildings in Haverstraw, New York, were burned down by British raiders. From July 15 to July 18, 1778, Hay's temporary residence, that of his brother-in-law William Smith in what is now West Haverstraw, served as headquarters for Washington. His farm was raided again in the summer of 1779 by the British.

== Private life ==
Coat of Arms of Ann Hawkes Hay

Hay went with Isaac Wilkins to study at King's College (now Columbia University). On October 5, 1763, he married Martha Smith (June 18, 1745 – March 30, 1821), daughter of Judge William Smith of Haverstraw and then returned to Kingston. After several unsuccessful attempts to start a family, the couple returned to Haverstraw and purchased approximately 200 acres of land near the Minisceongo Creek in December 1773. They subsequently had nine children.

He died on April 18, 1785, in New York City. Afterwards, his widow and most of the children moved to South Carolina.

== See also ==
- Udney Hay – Also known as Col. Hay during the American Revolutionary War in the New York area

== Bibliography ==
- Colcock, Charles J. (1908). The Family of Hay. A History of the Progenitors and some South Carolina Descendants of Colonel Ann Hawkes Hay. New York City: The Genealogical Association.
