= Joshua Hett Smith House =

Historic house related to American Revolutionary War

Coordinates: 41°12′48″N 73°59′18.51″W

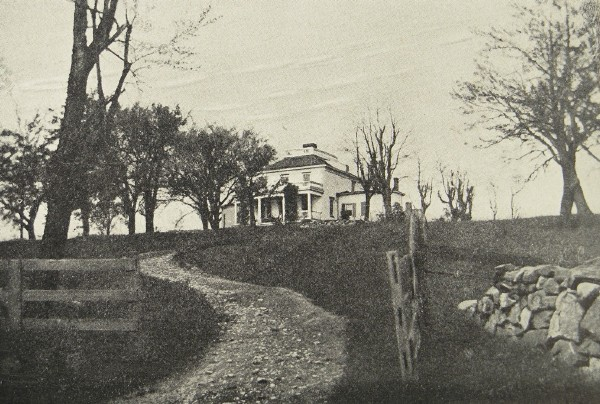
"Joshua Hett Smith House, Treason Hill," circa 1909.

Joshua Hett Smith House, also known as Treason House, was a historic house in West Haverstraw, New York. It stood on a hill overlooking the King's Ferry at Stony Point, an important crossing of the Hudson River. During the American Revolutionary War, General Benedict Arnold met at the house with British Major John André, while plotting to surrender the fort at West Point. Later, the house had a brief tenure as headquarters for General George Washington. It was demolished in 1929 to expand a children’s hospital.

== Early history ==
The house was built about 1770 on the property of Thomas Smith, a lawyer in New York City, who inherited the land following the 1769 death of his father, Judge William Smith. Judge Smith had been a major property owner in the area, and his holdings were divided among his six sons and several daughters. Another son was Joshua Hett Smith, who was living in this house he called "Belmont" in 1780.

== Arnold ==
Arnold became a celebrated hero early in the Revolutionary War. Severely wounded in the 1777 Battles of Saratoga, his shattered left leg left him unable to ride a horse or walk without pain. In June 1778, he was made military governor of southeast Pennsylvania, stationed in Philadelphia. His taste for high living and use of soldiers for personal tasks made him unpopular. In April 1779, he married Peggy Shippen, the daughter of a prominent Tory. That same month, he began a treasonous correspondence with British General Henry Clinton. By the summer, he was informing Clinton of American troop locations and strengths, and negotiating a fee to switch sides.

Arnold angrily resigned his military command of Philadelphia in March 1780, in response to a Congressional inquiry into expenses he incurred during the failed 1775–76 invasion of Quebec and an upcoming court-martial (in April, at which he was cleared of all but minor charges). In mid-July 1780, he wrote to Clinton offering to surrender the fort at West Point for £20,000. It was not until July 31 that he met with Washington to request command of the fort, and August 3 when he was installed as its commander.

The fort at West Point, located on a hill above a narrow bend in the Hudson River, was the key military site for defending the river. The British believed that control of the river would isolate New England from the rest of the Colonies, and cause the rebellion to fail.

While en route to West Point, Arnold renewed his acquaintance with Joshua Hett Smith, who had spied for both sides. They were co-conspirators by September 10, when the general stayed overnight at Smith's house, located about 15 miles south of the fort. A meeting with Major André was to take place in the early morning hours of September 11, but the rendezvous had to be abandoned when Smith's rowboat was fired upon. Arnold and André finally met before dawn on September 22: André sailed up the Hudson River aboard HMS Vulture; a rowboat containing Arnold and Smith (and two of Smith's allies rowing) met the British warship mid-river and carried André to the western shore. Arnold and André talked through the night at Smith's house, but the Vulture was fired upon and moved downriver, stranding the British major behind American lines.

André, despite being given a pass signed by Arnold, was captured, tried as a spy, and hanged. Arnold made it safely to New York City, where he was given a commission in the British Army.

== Joshua Hett Smith ==
Joshua Hett Smith (May 27, 1749 – 1818) was the son of Judge William Smith and brother of Chief Justice of the Province of New York William Smith.

Joshua Hett Smith, at whose house, near Stony Point, Arnold and André held their interview (September 22), was tried by a military court and acquitted. He was soon afterwards arrested by the civil authorities and committed to jail at Goshen, Orange County, whence he escaped and made his way through the country, in the disguise of a woman, to New York. Smith went to England with the British army at the close of the war, and in 1808 published a book in London entitled An Authentic Narrative of the Causes which led to the Death of Major André , a work of very little reliable authority. He died at New York in 1818.

== Washington ==
The house served as Washington's headquarters from August 20 to 25, 1781. The American and French armies were then on the march to Yorktown, Virginia, and it took four days to ferry the troops, horses, wagons and cannons across the Hudson River.

The house came to be known as "Treason House," and the hill overlooking the Hudson River was named "Treason Hill."

== 20th century ==
The house was in a state of disrepair in the mid-1910s, when a campaign was launched to buy and restore it. The New York State Hospital for Crippled Children stood on an adjacent property, and wished to expand. The house was demolished in 1929 for that expansion. The hospital was renamed in 1974 to honor actress Helen Hayes.

== See also ==
- List of Washington's Headquarters during the Revolutionary War

== Sources ==
- Randall, Willard Sterne (1990). Benedict Arnold: Patriot and Traitor. William Morrow and Co. Inc. ISBN 1-55710-034-9.
