= William Smith (judge, born 1697) =

English-American American lawyer and jurist

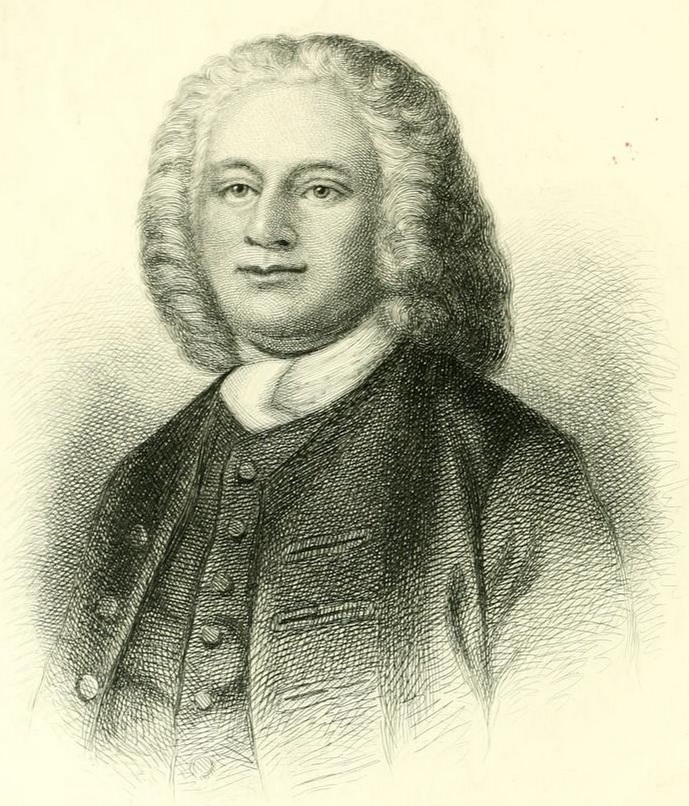

Attorney General of New York
- In office 1751–1752
- Preceded by: Richard Bradley
- Succeeded by: William Kempe

Personal details
- Born: 8 October 1697 Newport Pagnell, England
- Died: 22 November 1769 (aged 72) New York City, Province of New York, British America
- Spouses: Mary Het (m. 1727; died 1754) Elizabeth Scott (m. 1761)
- Children: William Smith; Joshua Hett Smith
- Education: Yale College

William Smith (8 October 1697 – 22 November 1769) was an American lawyer and jurist.

== Life ==
Smith was born on 8 October 1697 in Newport Pagnell in England. He was the eldest of five sons born to Thomas Smith (1675–1745) and Susanna (née Odell) Smith (1675–1729).

In 1715, he emigrated with his family to New York where his father became one of the founders of the First Presbyterian Church on Wall Street, inviting Jonathan Edwards to serve as minister. Once in America, Smith studied religion, law and the classics at Yale College, graduating in 1719.

== Career ==
After his graduation from Yale, he worked as a tutor there before being offered the presidency when he was 27 years old. Smith declined the offer, in order to begin a law practice in New York City.

In 1751, he was appointed Attorney General of New York, followed by an appointment as a member of the Governor's Council, serving on the latter from 1753 until 1767. In 1760, Smith was offered the position of Chief Justice of the Province of New York. Against the advice of friends and family, he turned down the offer. Smith's son, the younger William Smith, was then offered the position, which he accepted. In 1763, he became judge of the New York Supreme Court.

He wrote the charter to create and was involved in the establishment of the College of New Jersey, today known as Princeton University and was a trustee from 1746 until his death (Jonathan Edwards later served as president of the College in 1758). Smith was also known for opposing the Anglican domination of King's College in New York (today Columbia University).

He was elected to the American Philosophical Society in 1744.

Smith was also known as part of the legal team that was victorious on behalf of the printer and newspaper publisher John Peter Zenger.

== Personal life ==
Coat of Arms of Judge William Smith

In 1727, Smith was married to Mary Het (1710–1754), a daughter of René Het and Blanche Dubois, French Huguenots who fled France following the Revocation of the Edict of Nantes in 1685. Together, William and Mary were the parents of fourteen children, including:

- William Smith (1728–1793), the Chief Justice of the Province of New York and, later, of Canada in Quebec. He married Janet Livingston (1730–1819), a granddaughter of Robert Livingston the Younger.
- Sarah Smith (1732–1815), who in 1755 married Abraham Keteltas, a minister elected to the Provincial Congress.
- Elizabeth Blanche Smith (1736–1817), who married John Torrans (1702–1780).
- James Smith (1738–1812), a physician.
- Martha Smith (1745–1821), who married Ann Hawkes Hay, an American officer during the Revolutionary War.
- Margaret Smith (1747–1799), who married Alexander Rose (1731–1801), who represented Prince George Winyah in the North Carolina Royal Assembly in 1779.
- Thomas Smith, a physician.
- Joshua Hett Smith (1749–1818), who was known as the "dupe of the Benedict Arnold" for his participation in a conspiracy to capture West Point for the British.

After the death of his first wife in 1754, he married noted hymnwriter Elizabeth (née Scott) Williams (1708–1776) in 1761. Elizabeth, the widow of Elisha Williams (the 4th Rector of Yale College), was a sister to Thomas Scott and Dr. Joseph Nicol Scott, and the niece of Daniel Scott (an English nonconformist minister and lexicographer).

Smith died in New York City on 22 November 1769.
