= West Haverstraw, New York =

- Village
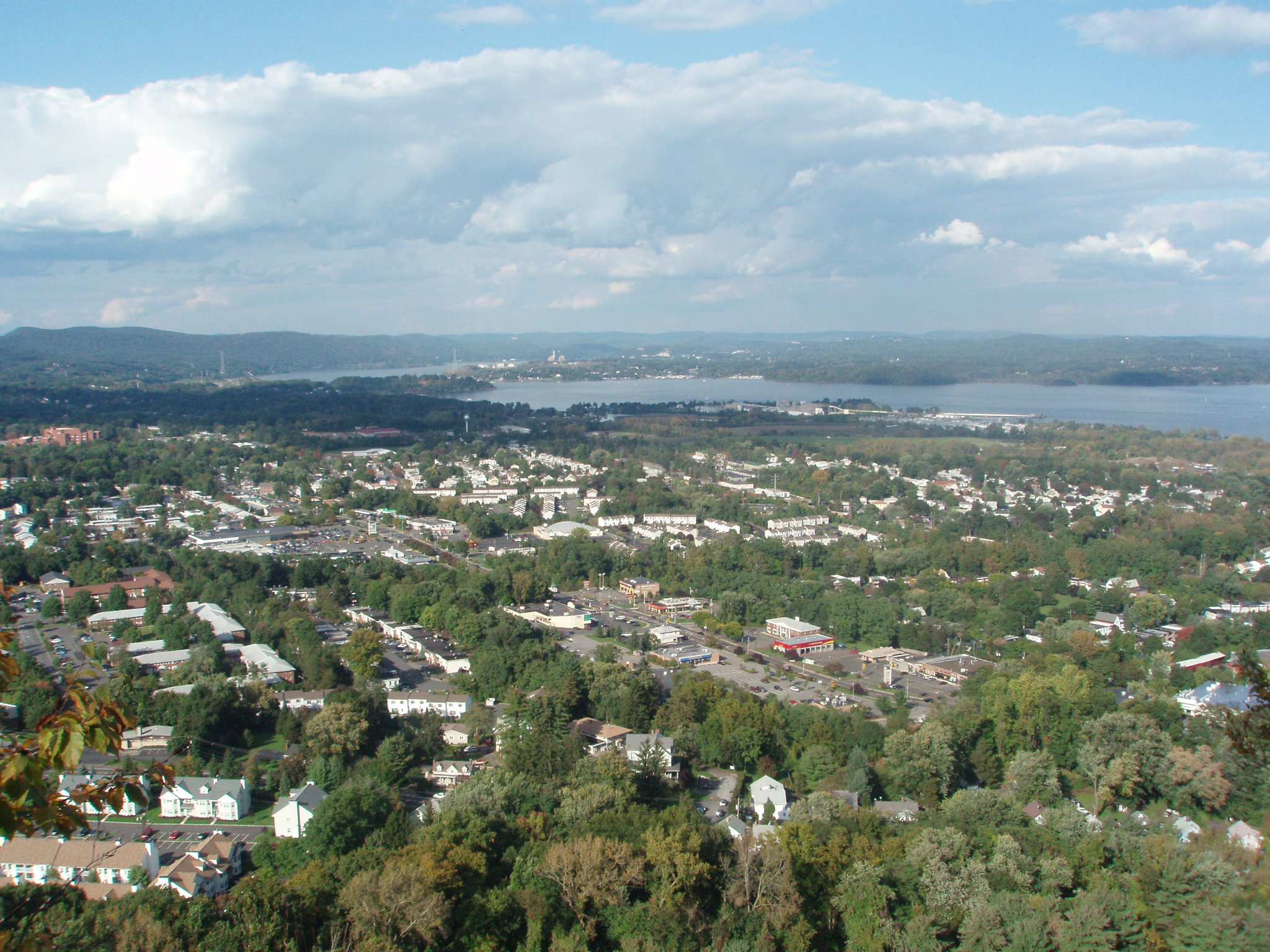
- Views of West Haverstraw From Hi Tor Mountain

- Location in Rockland County and the state of New York.

- Location within the state of New York
- Coordinates: 41°12′17″N 73°59′26″W
- Country: United States
- State: New York
- County: Rockland
- Town: Haverstraw
- Incorporated: 1883

Government
  - Mayor: Robert R. D’Amelio
  - Deputy Mayor: Frances R. Nardi
  - Trustees: Ralph W. Kirschkel, Robert J. LaGrow, Ramon Lopez, and Kenia Serrano

Area
  - Total: 1.54 sq mi (3.99 km^{2})
  - Land: 1.52 sq mi (3.93 km^{2})
  - Water: 0.023 sq mi (0.06 km^{2})
- Elevation: 108 ft (33 m)

Population (2020)
  - Total: 10,678
  - Density: 7,033.0/sq mi (2,715.44/km^{2})
- Time zone: UTC-5 (Eastern (EST))
  - Summer (DST): UTC-4 (EDT)
- ZIP code: 10993
- Area code: 845
- FIPS code: 36-80203
- GNIS feature ID: 0969245
- Website: https://www.westhaverstraw.gov/

West Haverstraw is a village incorporated in 1883 in the town of Haverstraw, Rockland County, New York, United States. It is located northwest of Haverstraw village, east of Thiells, south of the hamlet of Stony Point, and west of the Hudson River. As of the 2020 census, West Haverstraw had a population of 10,678. The majority of the hamlet of Garnerville is contained in the village of West Haverstraw.

== Geography ==
West Haverstraw is located at 41°12′17″N 73°59′26″W (41.204594, -73.990665).

According to the United States Census Bureau, the village has a total area of 1.5 square miles (3.9 km^{2}), of which 1.5 square miles (3.9 km^{2}) is land and 0.65% is water.

== Demographics ==
Historical population
Census	Pop.	Note	%±
1890	180		—
1900	2,079		1,055.0%
1910	2,369		13.9%
1920	2,018		−14.8%
1930	2,834		40.4%
1940	2,533		−10.6%
1950	3,099		22.3%
1960	5,020		62.0%
1970	8,558		70.5%
1980	9,181		7.3%
1990	9,183		0.0%
2000	10,295		12.1%
2010	10,165		−1.3%
2020	10,678		5.0%
U.S. Decennial Census

=== 2020 census ===
As of the 2020 census, West Haverstraw had a population of 10,678. The median age was 37.5 years. 23.6% of residents were under the age of 18 and 14.0% of residents were 65 years of age or older. For every 100 females there were 90.4 males, and for every 100 females age 18 and over there were 86.6 males age 18 and over.

100.0% of residents lived in urban areas, while 0.0% lived in rural areas.

There were 3,444 households in West Haverstraw, of which 40.9% had children under the age of 18 living in them. Of all households, 43.6% were married-couple households, 15.4% were households with a male householder and no spouse or partner present, and 32.5% were households with a female householder and no spouse or partner present. About 21.5% of all households were made up of individuals and 10.0% had someone living alone who was 65 years of age or older.

There were 3,573 housing units, of which 3.6% were vacant. The homeowner vacancy rate was 1.0% and the rental vacancy rate was 2.9%.

Racial composition as of the 2020 census
Race	Number	Percent
White	3,250	30.4%
Black or African American	2,124	19.9%
American Indian and Alaska Native	85	0.8%
Asian	531	5.0%
Native Hawaiian and Other Pacific Islander	6	0.1%
Some other race	2,631	24.6%
Two or more races	2,051	19.2%
Hispanic or Latino (of any race)	5,355	50.1%

=== 2010 census ===
As of the 2010 census, the population of West Haverstraw was 10,165 and the demographics were as follows:

- 40.9% Hispanic
- 36.3% White
- 16.2% Black
- 0.1% Native American
- 4.5% Asian
- 0.0% Native Hawaiian
- 0.2% Some other race
- 1.8% Two or more races

=== 2000 census ===
As of the 2000 census, there were 10,295 people, 3,542 households, and 2,521 families residing in the village. The population density was 6,670.3 inhabitants per square mile (2,575.4/km^{2}). There were 3,634 housing units at an average density of 2,354.5 per square mile (909.1/km^{2}). The racial makeup of the village was 64.85% white, 12.80% African American, 0.55% Native American, 4.15% Asian, 0.10% Pacific Islander, 12.67% from other races, and 4.89% from two or more races. Hispanic or Latino of any race were 30.37% of the population.

There were 3,542 households, out of which 37.2% had children under the age of 18 living with them, 52.1% were married couples living together, 14.6% had a female householder with no husband present, and 28.8% were non-families. 24.2% of all households were made up of individuals, and 11.2% had someone living alone who was 65 years of age or older. The average household size was 2.87 and the average family size was 3.45.

In the village, the population was spread out, with 27.4% under the age of 18, 7.8% from 18 to 24, 32.2% from 25 to 44, 20.7% from 45 to 64, and 11.9% who were 65 years of age or older. The median age was 35 years. For every 100 females, there were 92.2 males. For every 100 females age 18 and over, there were 86.3 males.

The median income for a household in the village was $48,420, and the median income for a family was $55,964. Males had a median income of $37,532 versus $29,333 for females. The per capita income for the village was $19,879. About 7.9% of families and 10.6% of the population were below the poverty line, including 13.4% of those under age 18 and 12.6% of those age 65 or over.

== Transportation ==
Local transit is operated by Transport of Rockland. The village is served by the #91, #94, #95, and #97 routes.

Short Line, part of Coach USA, provides daily service along U.S. Route 9W heading to and from the Port Authority Bus Terminal in Midtown Manhattan and West Point Military Academy or Newburgh.

== Tourism ==
=== Historical markers ===
- Treason House - Route 9W - Long Clove Congers - Haverstraw, near where Route 304 runs into Route 9W. On the night of September 21–22, 1780, Major John André landed at this point to confer with Maj. Gen. Benedict Arnold, who gave secret information about West Point fortifications and forces to André. At dawn, the conspirators adjourned to the Belmont House, owned by Thomas Smith and occupied by his brother Joshua Hett Smith in West Haverstraw, to complete their plans. "Clove" is from Dutch for "pass."
- Crossroads - Route 9W and West Railroad Avenue
- Col. A. H. Hay - Route 9W
- Samsondale - 40 South Route 9W

=== Landmarks and places of interest ===
- Fraser-Hoyer House (NRHP)
- Paul Piperato Haverstraw Bay Park
- Haverstraw Marina
- Helen Hayes Hospital, rehabilitation hospital named after its benefactor, the actress Helen Hayes
- Henry M. Peck House Site (NRHP)
- Peck's Pond
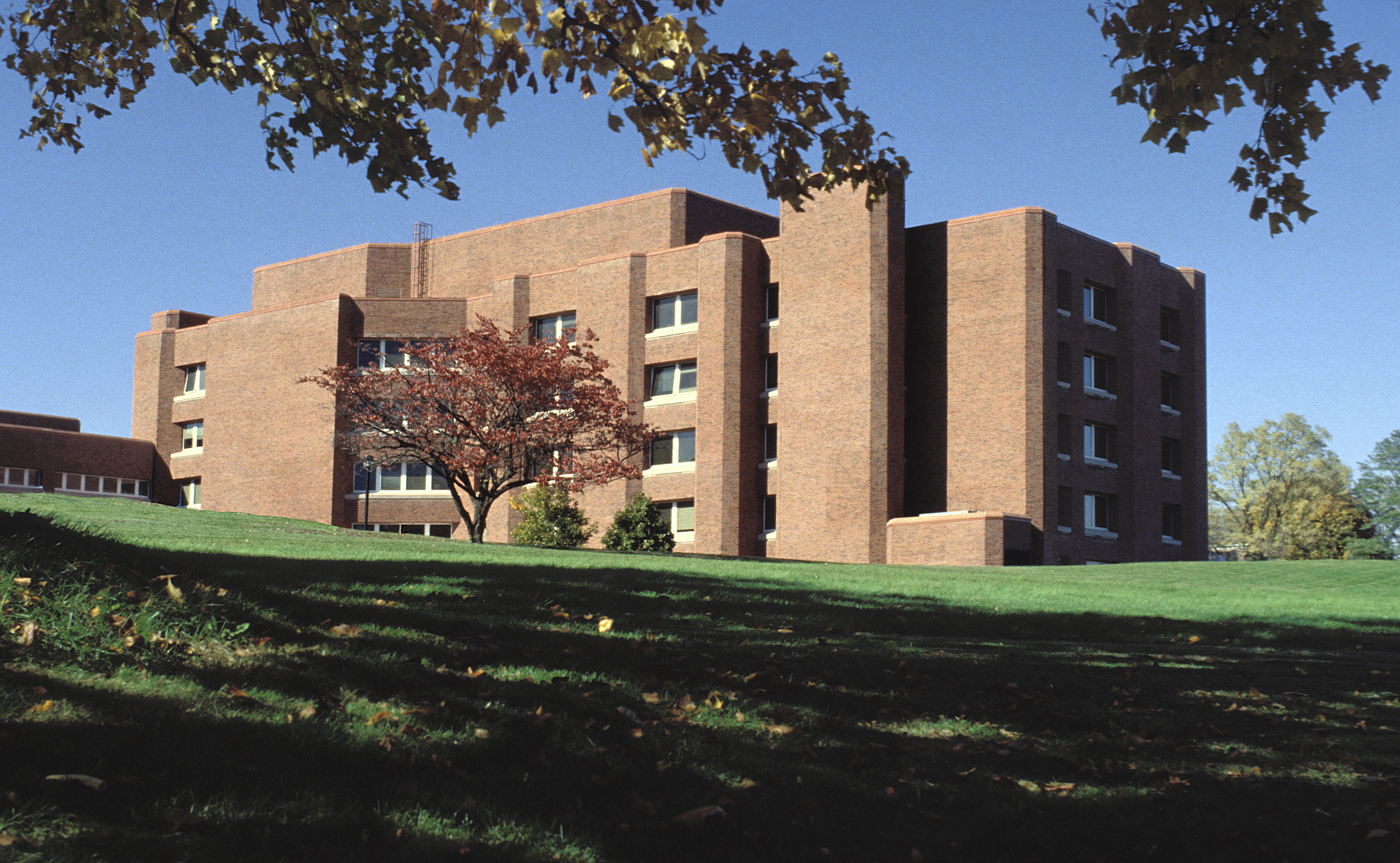
Helen Hayes Hospital

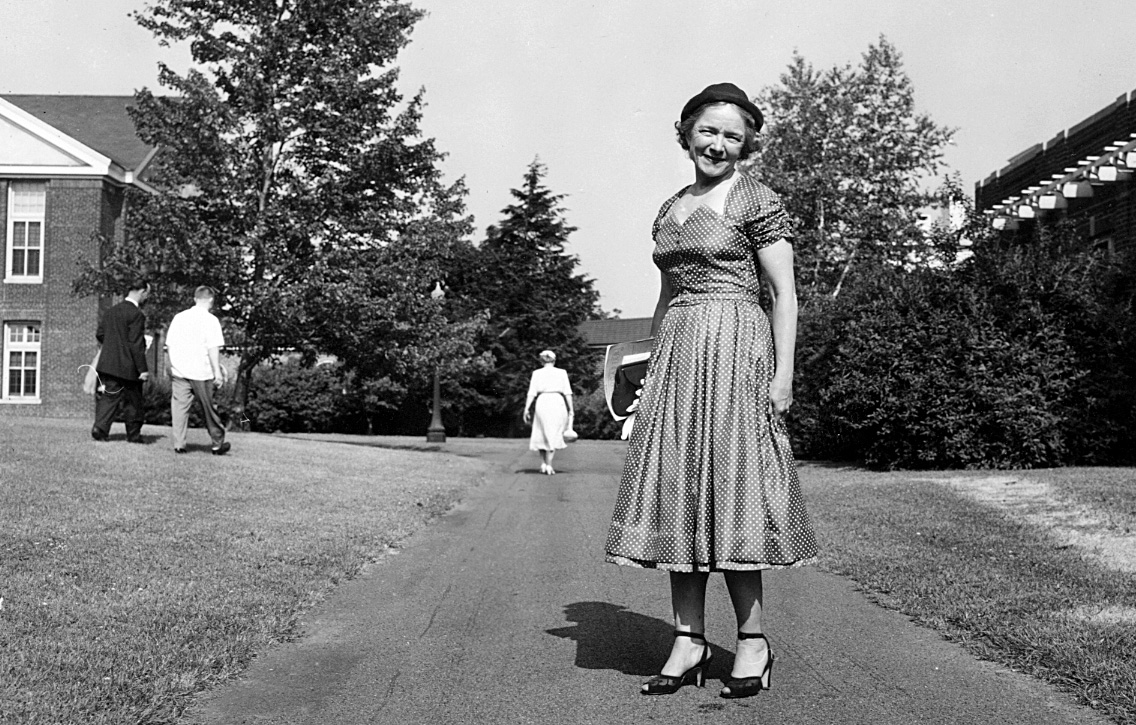
Helen Hayes MacArthur

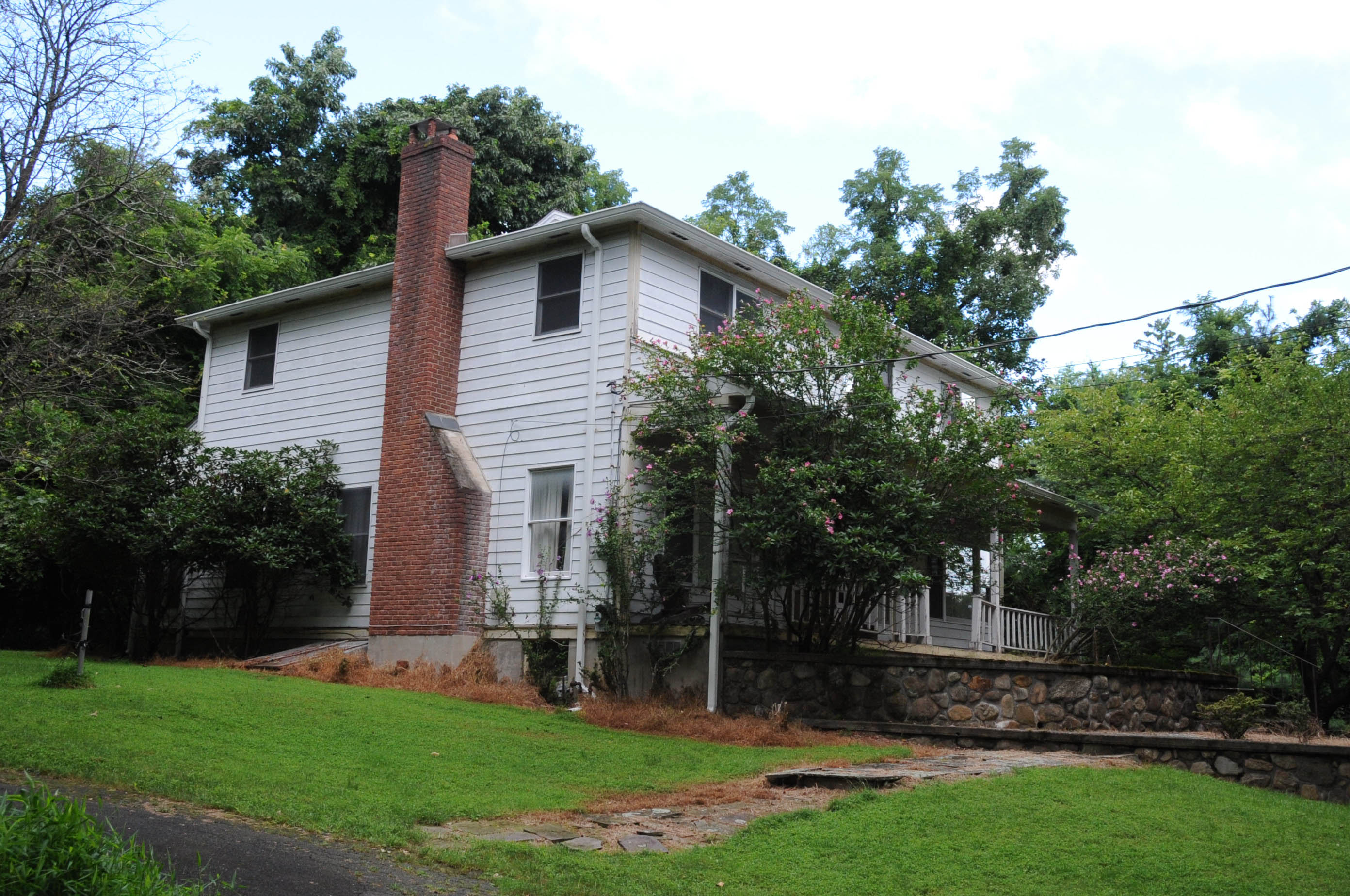
Fraser Hoyer House

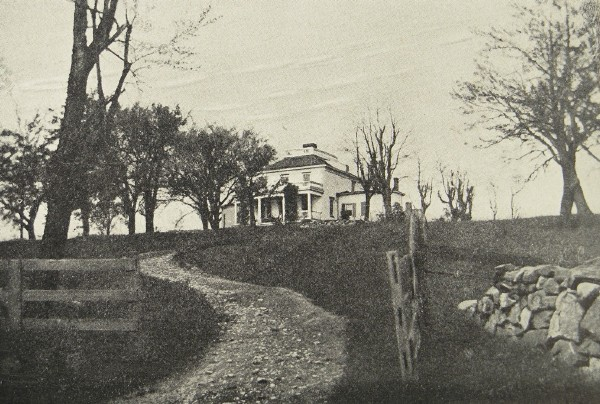
Treason House - (Joshua Hett Smith House)

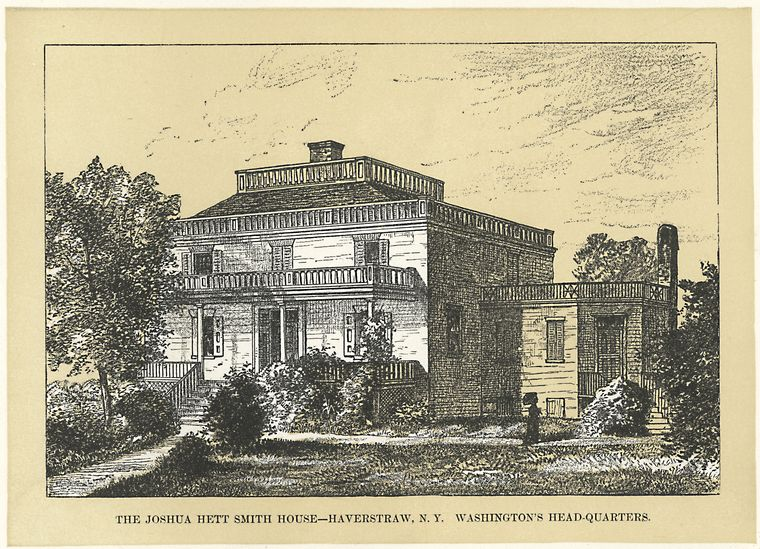
Washington's Headquarters

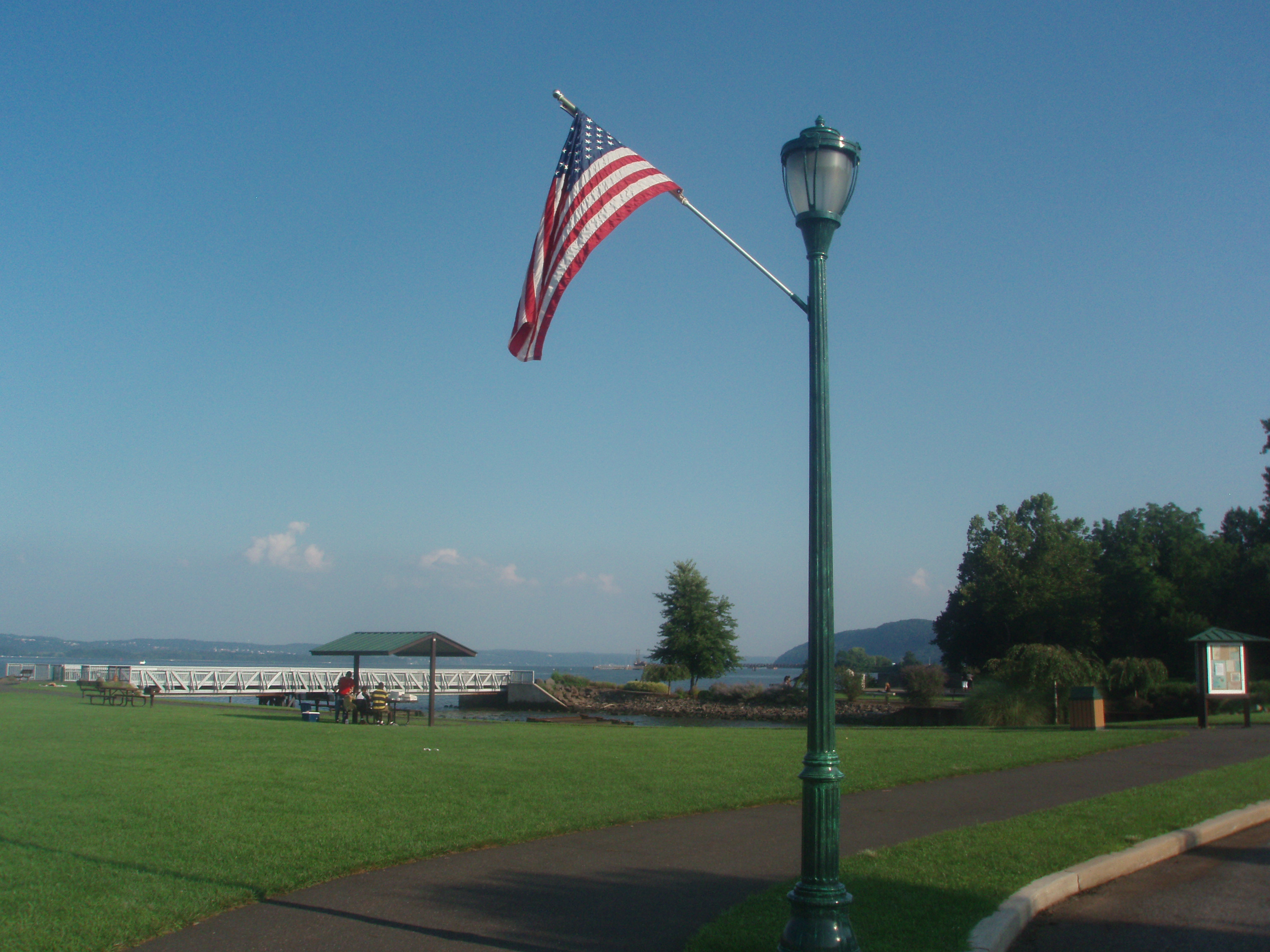
Paul Piperato Haverstraw Bay Park Along the Hudson River

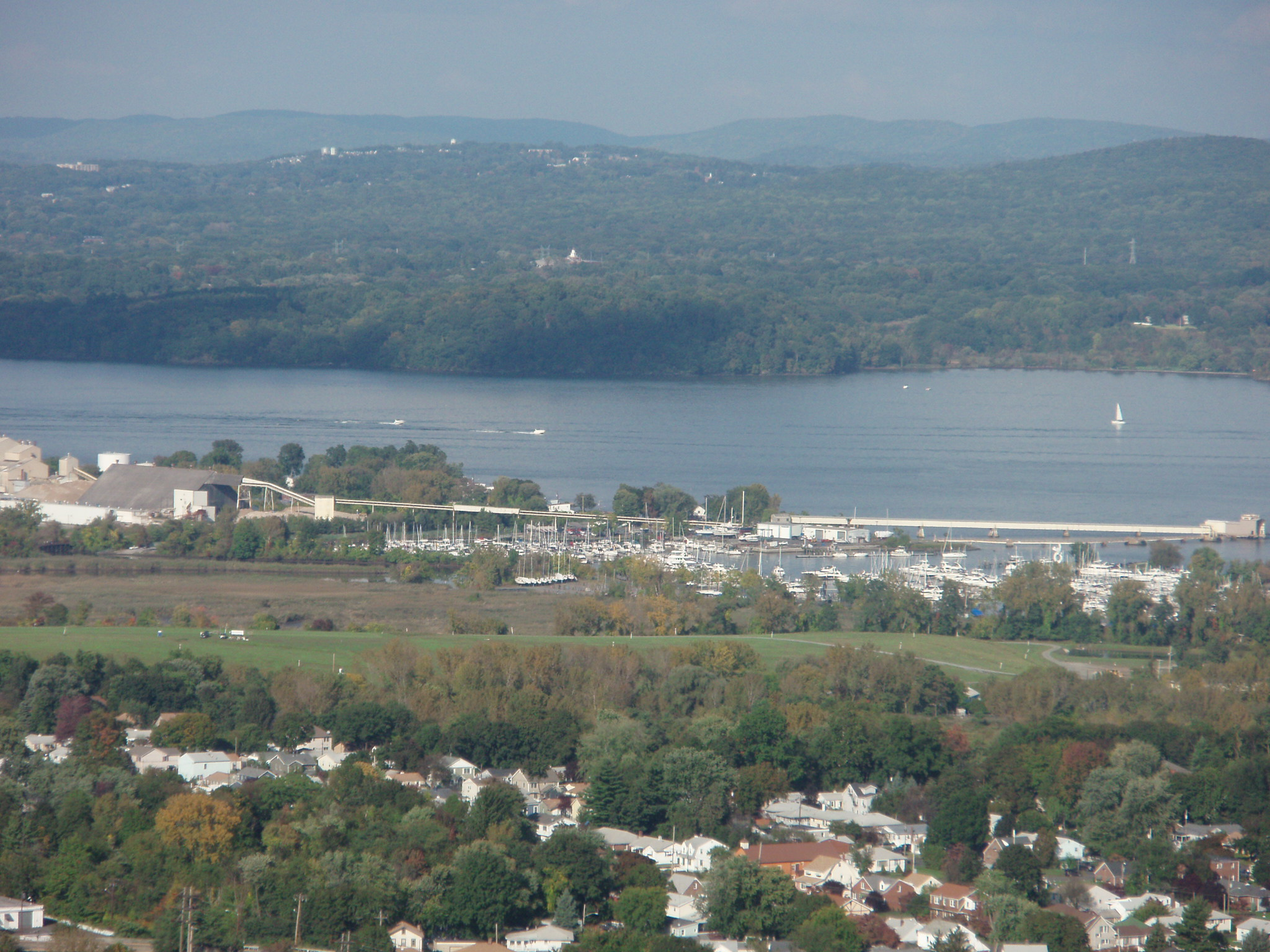
Haverstraw Marina along the Hudson River

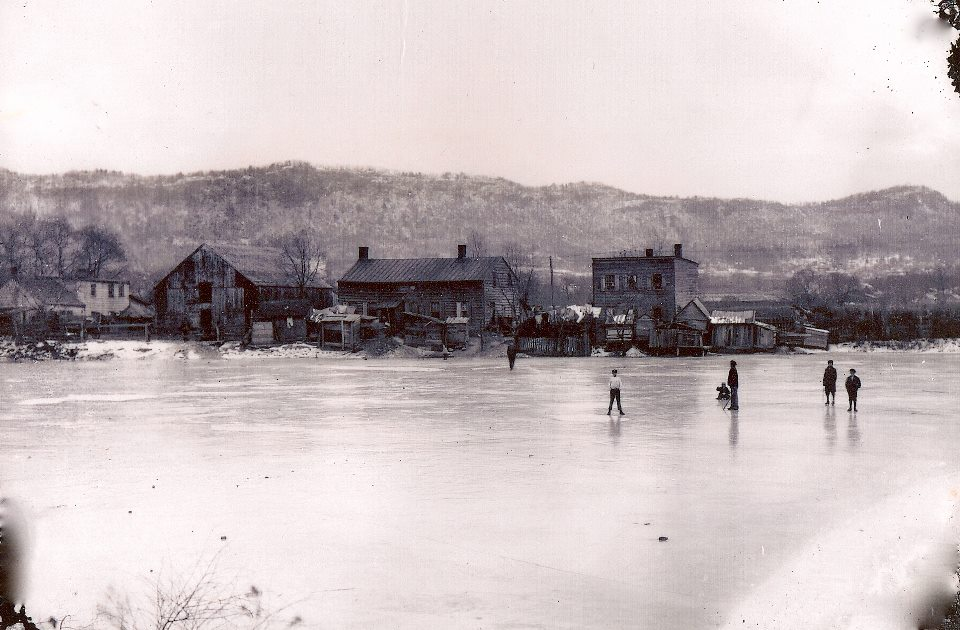
Peck's Pond

== Notable people ==
- Steward Ceus, soccer player and coach who represented the Haiti national team
