= John André =

British Army officer (1750–1780)

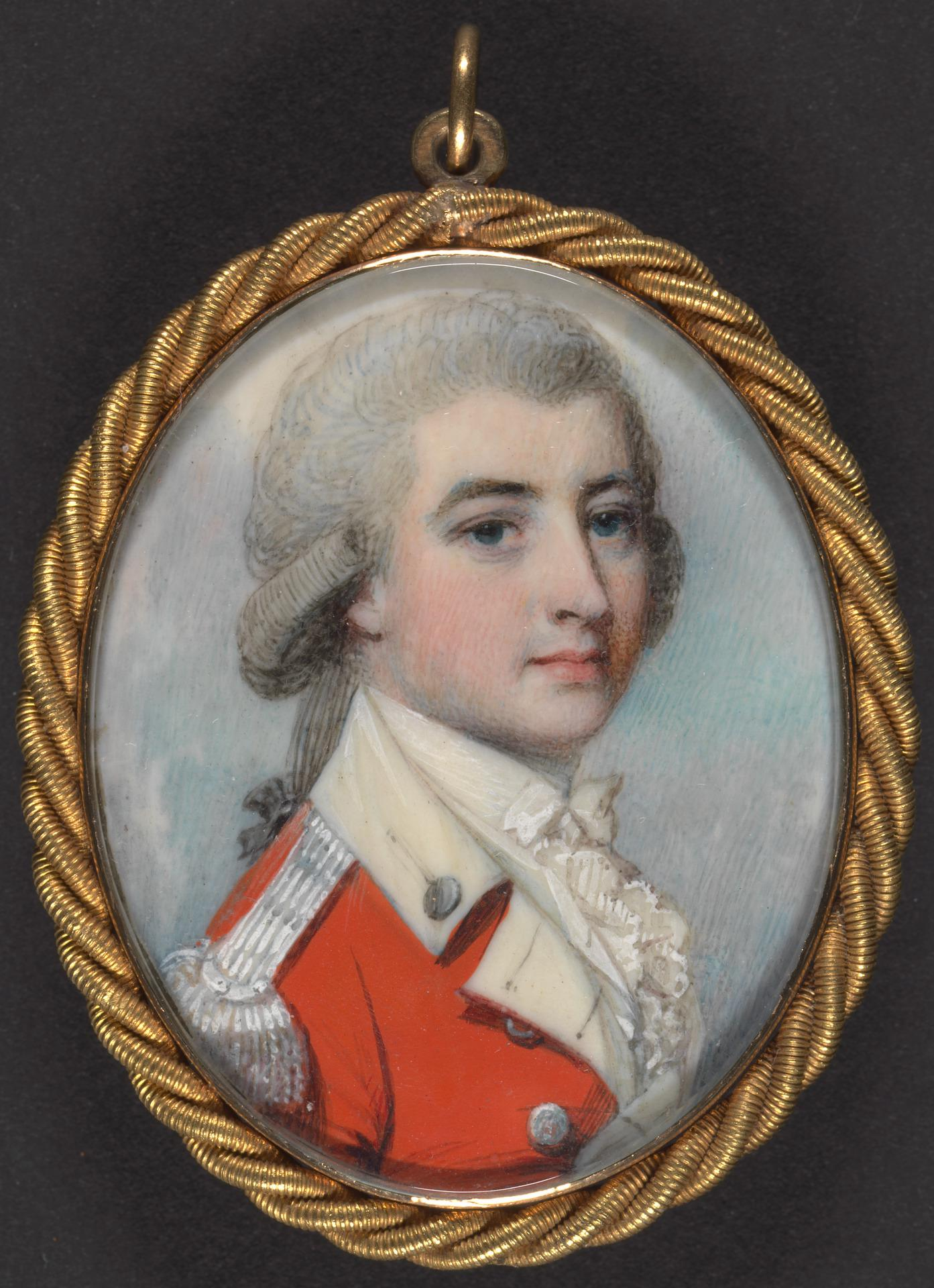
- Portrait by George Engleheart, 1772–1780
- Born: 2 May 1750 or 1751; London, England
- Died: 2 October 1780 (age 29 or 30); Tappan, New York
- Burial place: Westminster Abbey
- Military career
- Allegiance: Great Britain
- Branch: British Army
- Service years: 1770–1780
- Rank: Major
- Units: 23rd Regiment of Foot (Royal Welsh Fuzileers); 7th Regiment of Foot (Royal Fusiliers); 26th Regiment of Foot
- Conflicts: American War of Independence (executed); Battle of Brandywine; Battle of Germantown; Grey's raid

Signature
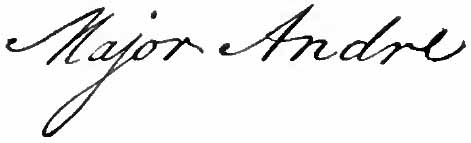

Major John André (May 2, 1750 or 1751 – October 2, 1780) was a British Army officer who served as the head of Britain's intelligence operations during the American War for Independence. In September 1780, André negotiated with Continental Army general Benedict Arnold, who secretly offered to turn over control of the American fort at West Point, New York, to the British. Due to a series of mishaps and unforeseen events, André was forced to try to return to British lines from a meeting with Arnold through American-controlled territory while wearing civilian clothes.

André was captured by three American militiamen and was quickly identified and imprisoned. He was subsequently convicted of espionage by the Continental Army and executed by hanging on George Washington's orders. His execution led to an outburst of anti-American sentiment in Great Britain, and American painter John Trumbull was imprisoned as a result. André is typically remembered positively by historians, and several prominent leaders of the Patriot cause, including Alexander Hamilton and the Marquis de Lafayette, disagreed with the decision to execute him.

== Early life ==
André was born on May 2, 1750 or 1751, in London, England, to wealthy Huguenot parents who had immigrated there from Continental Europe. His memorial in Westminster Abbey, created in 1782 when his mothers and siblings were still alive, refers to him as being 29 years old at his death, when a 1750 birthdate would have made him 30. He also refers to himself as "a poor novice of eighteen" in a letter written on October 3, 1769 to his friend Anna Seward, which would support a birth year of 1751. However, baptismal records indicate a birth date of 1750.

His parents were Antoine André, a merchant from Geneva, and Marie Louise Girardot, who had been born in Paris. André was educated at St Paul's School, Westminster School, and in Geneva; he was briefly engaged to Honora Sneyd. In 1771, at the age of 20, he joined the British Army, being commissioned into the 23rd Regiment of Foot (Royal Welsh Fuzileers) at the rank of second lieutenant before quickly being promoted to lieutenant in the 7th Regiment of Foot (Royal Fusiliers). André took a leave of absence in Germany for nearly two years, before re-joining his regiment in British North America in 1774.

== American War for Independence ==
During the early days of the American War for Independence, before independence was declared by the Continental Congress, André was captured at Fort Saint-Jean by Continental Army troops under the command of General Richard Montgomery in November 1775, and held prisoner at Lancaster, Pennsylvania. He lived in the home of Caleb Cope, enjoying the freedom of the town, as André had given his word not to escape. In December 1776, he was freed in a prisoner exchange, and was promoted to the rank of captain in the 26th Regiment of Foot on January 18, 1777. In the same year, André was appointed as an aide-de-camp to Major-General Charles Grey, serving in the British expedition to capture Philadelphia and participating in the battles of Brandywine and Germantown. In September 1778, he accompanied Grey during Grey's raid, and was sent back to Sir Henry Clinton as a dispatch bearer. After Grey returned to England, André was appointed as an aide-de-camp to Clinton with the rank of major.

André was met with a positive reception in American society, including in both Philadelphia and New York when they were under British military occupation. He had a lively and pleasant manner and could draw, paint, and create silhouettes, as well as sing and write verse. André was a prolific writer who carried on much of Clinton's correspondence. He was fluent in English, French, German and Italian. André also planned and organised the elaborate 13-hour fête known as the Mischianza, staged in Philadelphia in May 1778 to honor General William Howe, Clinton's predecessor, after Howe had resigned and was about to return to England. (Note: One of the participants of the Mischianza was seventeen-year-old Peggy Shippen, a daughter of a Philadelphia Loyalist, and the future wife of Benedict Arnold.) During his nearly nine months in Philadelphia, André lived in Benjamin Franklin's house, from which it has been alleged that he removed several valuable items on Grey's orders when the occupation of Philadelphia came to an end, including an oil portrait of Franklin by Benjamin Wilson. (Note: Grey's descendants returned Franklin's portrait to the United States in 1906, the bicentennial of Franklin's birth. The painting now hangs in the White House.)

=== Intelligence activities ===
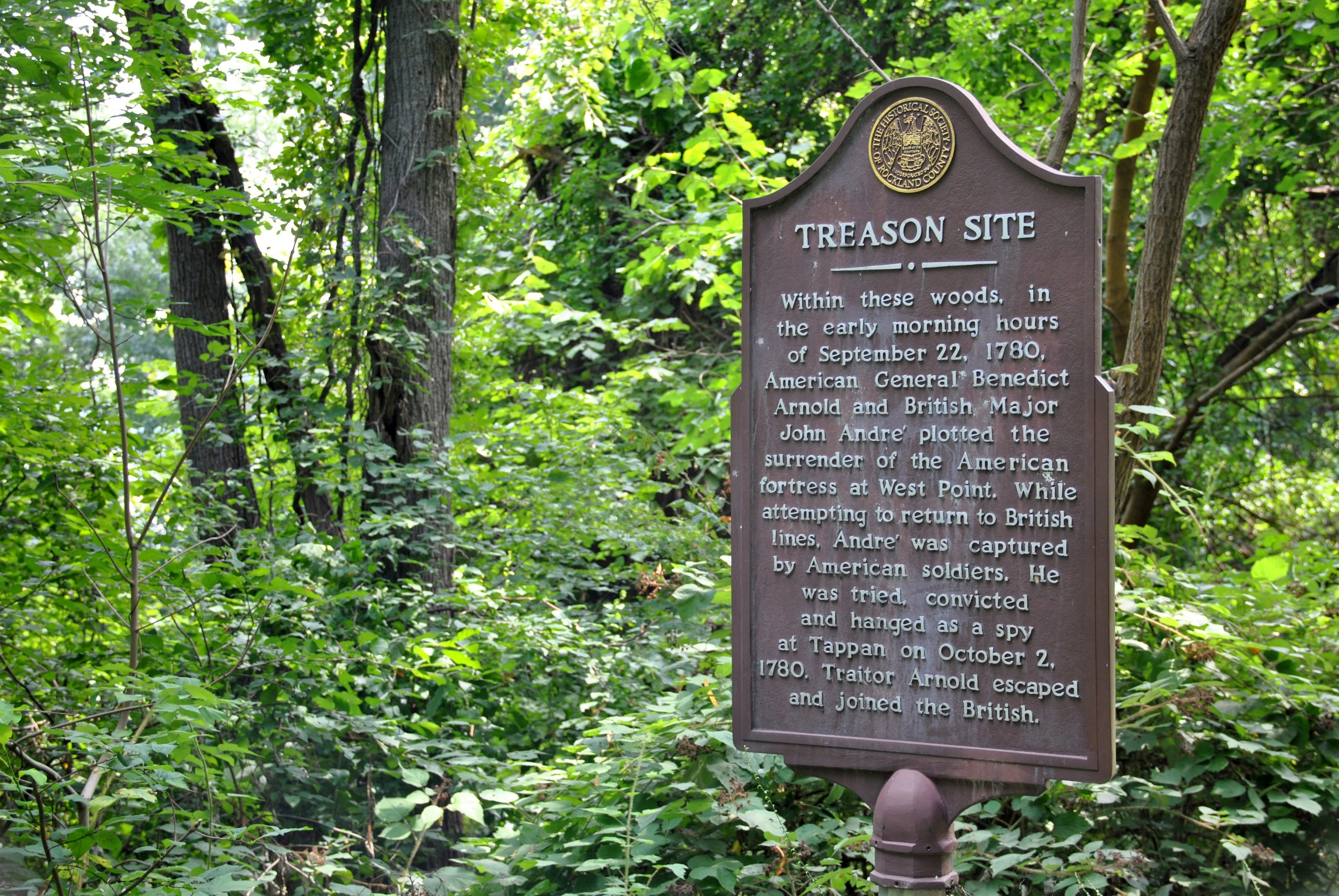
The location where André and Arnold plotted to surrender West Point to the British. It is located south of Haverstraw, New York, and forms part of the modern-day Hook Mountain State Park.

In 1779, André became adjutant general of the British Army at the rank of major. By April of that year, he took charge of British intelligence operations in North America. In 1780, André briefly took part in Clinton's invasion of the American South, which began with the successful siege of Charleston. Around this time, André took over control of British communication with Continental Army officer Benedict Arnold. Arnold was a popular general officer who had been wounded twice in battle, and was considered an American hero for his actions at the Battles of Saratoga. However, he had become bitter about the decline in his financial fortunes caused by the war, and the reluctance of the Continental Congress to grant him the promotions Arnold believed he deserved.

Arnold's Loyalist wife, Peggy Shippen, was one of the go-betweens in his correspondence with André. Arnold steadily provided the British with vital intelligence on American military movements and General George Washington's strategies. His ultimate goal was to be the key player in helping the British achieve a decisive blow against American forces for which he would be handsomely rewarded. In pursuit of this plan, Arnold carefully maneuvered his way into the command of critical Continental Army fortifications at West Point, New York, secretly promising to surrender them to the British for £20,000 (approximately £3.62 million in 2021). Possession of the forts at West Point would deliver to the British effective control of the entire Hudson River waterway, and could have very well served as the death-blow to the Patriot cause.

As the summer of 1780 came to an end, Arnold had at last taken command of West Point, and was in a position to facilitate a British takeover of the forts. On September 20 André traveled up the Hudson River onboard the Royal Navy sloop-of-war Vulture to meet Arnold. The presence of Vulture on the river was discovered the following morning by two American soldiers, privates John "Rifle Jack" Peterson and Moses Sherwood. From their position at Teller's Point, they attacked Vulture with small arms fire. Seeking greater firepower, Peterson and Sherwood headed to Fort Lafayette at Verplanck's Point to request cannons and ammunition from their commander, Colonel James Livingston.

During this pause in the skirmish, a small boat furnished by Arnold was steered to Vulture by Joshua Hett Smith. At the oars were the Colquhon brothers (both of whom were tenants of Smith), who reluctantly rowed the boat 6 miles (10 km) on the river to Vulture. Despite Arnold's assurances, the brothers sensed that something was wrong. None of the trio knew Arnold's purpose or suspected him of treason; all were told that his intentions were to assist the Patriot cause. Only Smith was told anything specific, and that was the false claim that it was to secure vital intelligence. The brothers finally agreed to row after Arnold mixed threats of arrest with a bribe of fifty pounds of flour for each man. They picked up André from Vulture and brought him ashore, where Arnold was waiting.

The two men conferred in the woods below Stony Point, New York, on the river's west bank until nearly dawn on September 22. Then, instead of returning to Vulture, André decided to continue their conversation, and with the sun coming up, he and Arnold rode several miles to Smith's house in West Haverstraw, New York, owned by Thomas Smith, Joshua's brother. That same morning, American troops at Teller's Point, under the command of Livingston, began a two-hour cannonade against Vulture. Vulture, trapped by the Hudson's tidal currents, sustained several hits before it was finally able to escape downriver. The retreat of Vulture stranded André on shore.

=== Arrest ===
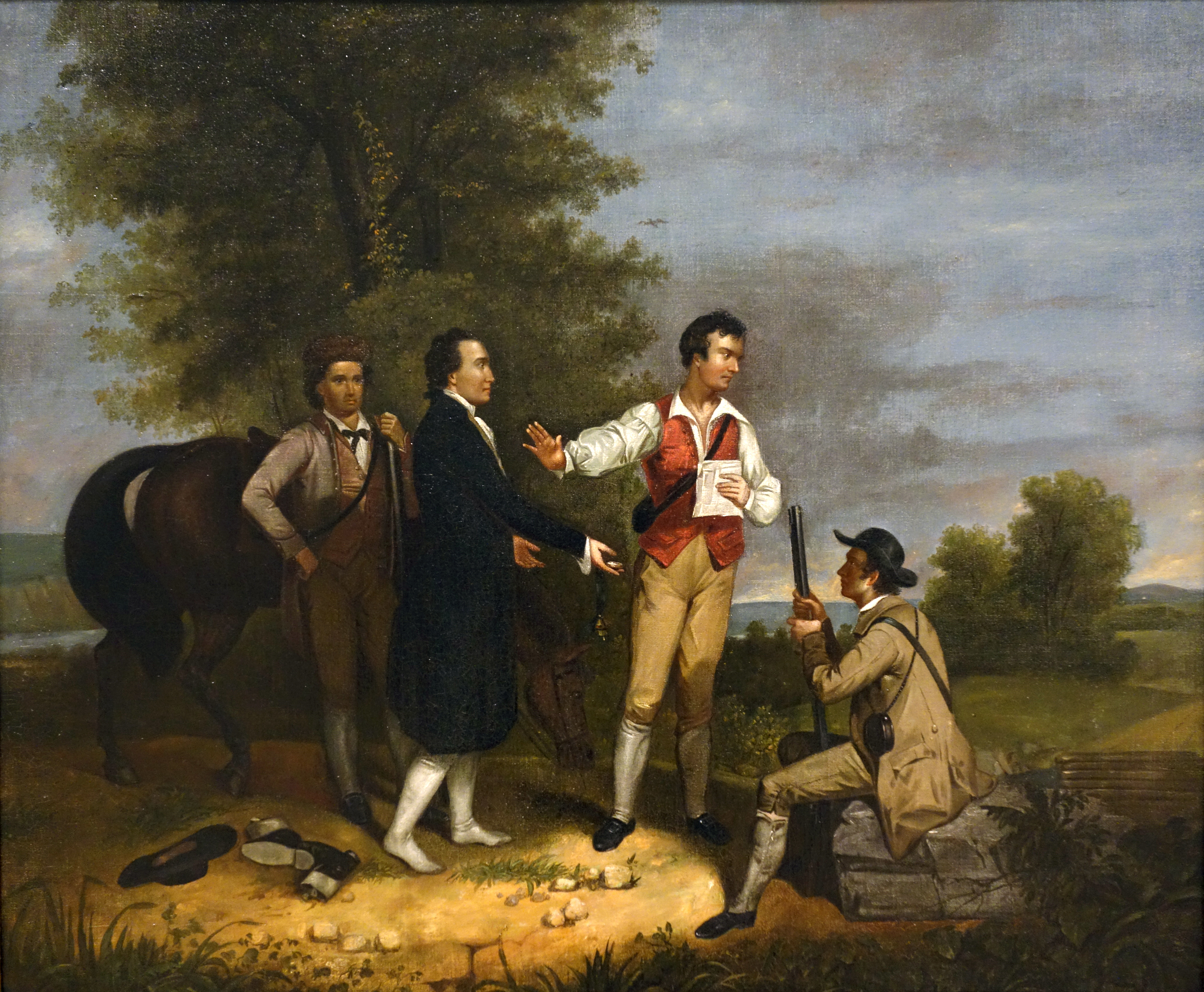
The Capture of Major Andre by Asher Durand, 1833 (Worcester Art Museum, Worcester, Massachusetts)

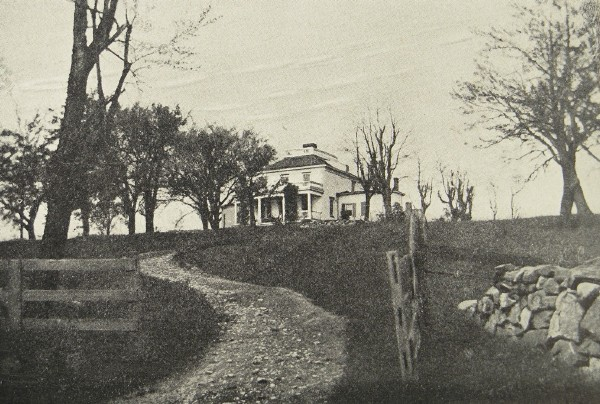
The Joshua Hett Smith House (since demolished) in 1909

Arnold persuaded André that his best option for returning to British lines was to travel overland, which meant that he would need to take off his uniform and put on civilian clothes. André carried six papers written by Arnold which were hidden in his stocking; they detailed to the British how to take the fort. In the event that André encountered American sentries, Arnold gave him a pass allowing him to travel under the name John Anderson. Arnold departed to return to his home, and Joshua Smith escorted André a few miles north, where the two men crossed to the east side of the Hudson River at King's Ferry. (Note: King's Ferry was a crossing roughly halfway between present-day Peekskill and Croton-on-Hudson, New York.) André, who had expected to travel to and from the meeting by ship while dressed in full uniform, was now traveling by road, in civilian disguise. He was deep behind American lines, and risked arrest as a spy.

After spending the night in a local home, the two men continued on to the Croton River, the southernmost edge of the American lines. Here, Smith left him, and André continued south in hopes of coming into contact with one of the Loyalist groups who marauded through Westchester County, New York. (This area, known as the "Neutral Ground," was a no man's land between the positions of the American Revolutionary forces and the British forces. Both the army troops and the partisans of both sides patrolled the countryside.) He had been warned to keep inland, but André instead shifted west until he was riding down the Albany Post Road, which followed the edge of the Hudson. André rode on safely until 9 a.m. on September 23, when he arrived at the crossing of a stream known as Clark's Kill (since renamed Andre Brook). (Note: The common and official local spelling for the stream in Tarrytown and Sleepy Hollow is "Andre Brook" (without the accent). Andre Brook today forms the boundary between Tarrytown, New York, and Sleepy Hollow, New York.) Here, three Americans: John Paulding, Isaac Van Wart, and David Williams stopped him. They were part of a scouting party of the Westchester County Militia, commanded by Sgt. John Dean, which also included James Romer, John Yerkes, Isaac See, and Abraham Williams (David Williams's sixteen-year-old cousin). Paulding, Van Wirt, and Williams were assigned by Sgt. Dean to position themselves on the Albany Post Road and intercept Loyalist cattle raiders and other suspicious travelers.

André believed that the trio were Loyalists because Paulding was wearing the uniform of a Hessian soldier. Paulding had himself escaped from a British prison only days earlier, aided by a sympathetic Loyalist who provided him with the uniform. "Gentlemen," André said, "I hope you belong to our party." "What party?" asked one of the trio. "The lower party", replied André, referring to the British, whose headquarters were to the south. "We do" was their answer. André then declared that he was a British officer who must not be detained. To his surprise, Paulding informed him that "We are Americans" and took him prisoner. André then tried to convince the men that he was an American officer by showing them the passport Arnold had provided to him. However, the suspicions of his captors were now aroused; they searched him and found Arnold's papers and the plans for West Point hidden in his stocking. Only Paulding could read, and Benedict Arnold's signature on André's pass was not the subject of suspicion. André offered them his horse and watch to let him go, but they declined.

André later testified at his trial that the trio searched his boots for the purpose of robbing him. Had it been true, the trio could have taken André's offer, the more so as the laws of New York's revolutionary government permitted the men to keep whatever property they might take from a Loyalist's person. The captors, however, brought him to the rest of the scouting party, and the group decided to take him to the Continental Army's frontline headquarters in Sands Mill, a hamlet within North Castle, New York, that was situated on the Connecticut border of Westchester County. At first, all went well for André: the post commandant, Lieutenant-Colonel John Jameson, unsure as to Arnold's role in André's mission, decided to send him back to Arnold's home close to West Point. However, Major Benjamin Tallmadge, head of Continental Army intelligence, arrived and was considerably more suspicious of Arnold's part in the episode. He persuaded Jameson to send a rider to bring André back.

Jameson sent Washington the six sheets of paper carried by André, but he hedged his bets about Arnold; Jameson knew that his own career would be in jeopardy if he treated Arnold with suspicion and Arnold were absolved of guilt. In place of André himself, he sent Arnold a letter informing him of André's capture. Arnold received Jameson's note while at breakfast with his officers, made an excuse to leave the room, and rushed upstairs to confer with his wife. Soon after, he made his escape to the Hudson, where he boarded his personal barge and ordered the crew to row him to the Vulture, which had returned to its northerly position on the river. Arnold turned himself over to the ship's commander, who promptly sailed for New York to deliver Arnold to Clinton. An hour or so later, Washington arrived at West Point with his party; he had not yet received Jameson's letter or the incriminating documents, and as yet knew nothing of Arnold's betrayal or his flight. Washington was disturbed to see the stronghold's fortifications in such neglect, which was part of Arnold's plan to weaken West Point's defenses. He was further irritated to find that Arnold had breached protocol by not being present to greet him.

Finally, several hours later, Washington returned to Arnold's home and headquarters on the eastern side of the Hudson, where the documents taken from André were presented to him. Instantly grasping the meaning and significance of the papers, Washington quickly sent men to try to intercept Arnold, but it was too late. André, meanwhile, was held in South Salem, New York, and then briefly at Arnold's home, before being transferred across the Hudson to the Continental Army headquarters in Tappan, New York. According to Tallmadge's account of the events, he and André conversed during the latter's captivity and transport to Tappan. André wanted to know how he would be treated by Washington. Tallmadge had been a classmate of Nathan Hale while the two were studying at Yale College, and he spoke to André of Hale's capture, and what Tallmadge considered to be his cold-blooded execution by the British. André asked whether Tallmadge thought the situations similar; he replied, "Yes, precisely similar, and similar shall be your fate."

== Trial and execution ==
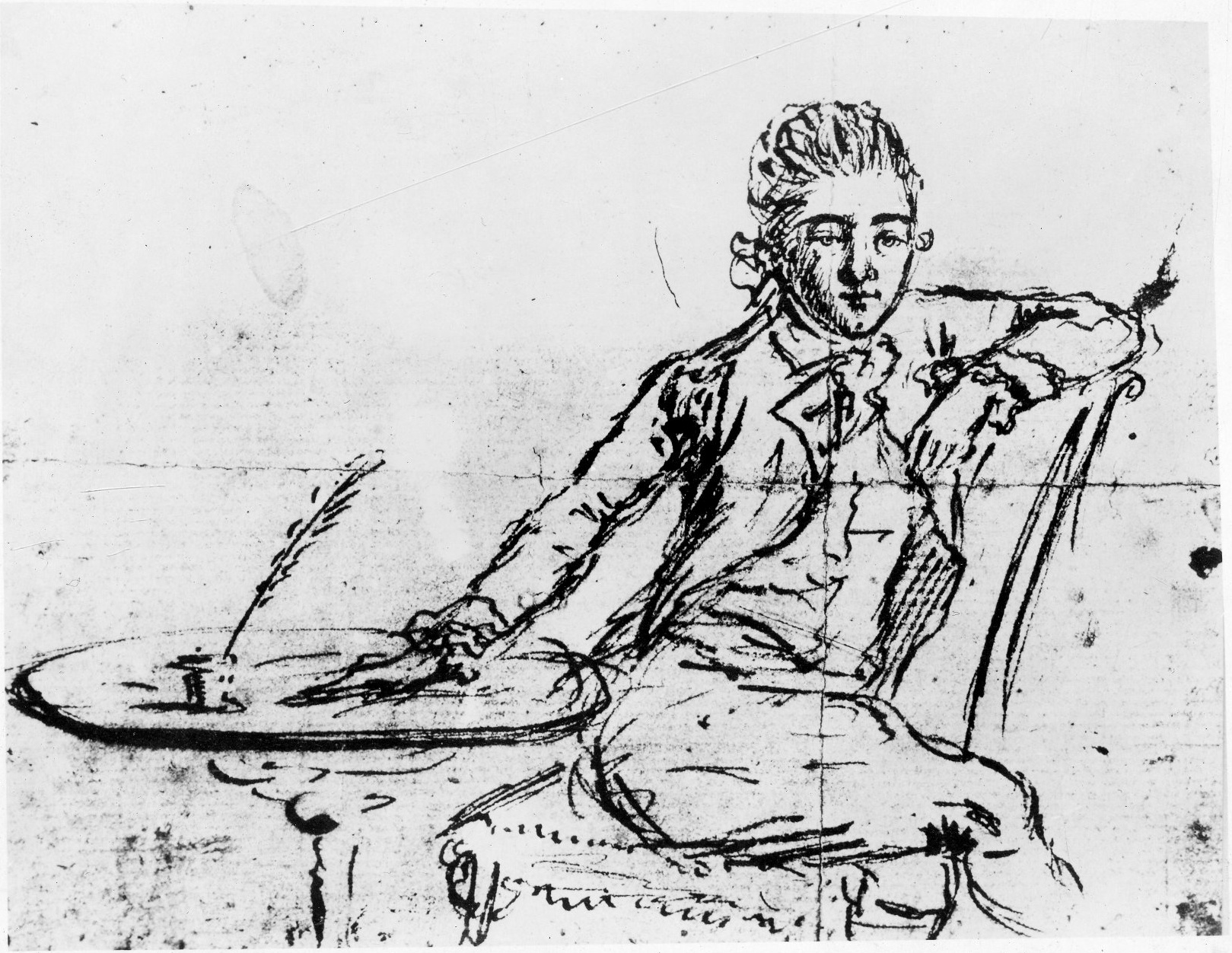
A self-portrait by André, drawn on the eve of his execution

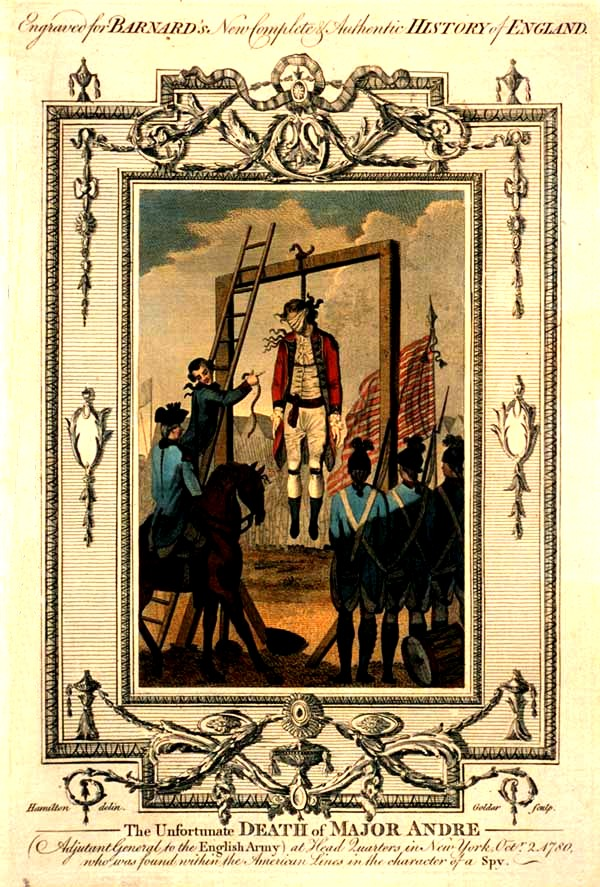
André's execution by the Continental Army

Washington convened a board of senior Continental Army officers to investigate the matter. The board consisted of major generals Nathanael Greene (presiding officer), William Alexander, Arthur St. Clair, the Marquis de Lafayette, Robert Howe and Friedrich Wilhelm von Steuben, brigadier generals Samuel H. Parsons, James Clinton, Henry Knox, John Glover, John Paterson, Edward Hand, Jedediah Huntington and John Stark, and Judge Advocate General John Laurance.

André's defence was that he was suborning an enemy officer, "an advantage taken in war". He told the board that he had neither desired nor planned to be behind American lines, but had been summoned ashore by Arnold and stranded there accidentally when Vulture sailed away. He also asserted that, as a prisoner of war, he had the right to escape in civilian clothes.

On September 29, 1780, the board found André guilty of being behind American lines "under a feigned name and in a disguised habit" and ordered that "Major André, Adjutant-General to the British Army, ought to be considered as a spy from the enemy, and that agreeable to the law and usage of nations, it is their opinion, he ought to suffer death." Sir Henry Clinton did all that he could to save André, his favourite aide-de-camp. However, in their written negotiations Washington demanded that in exchange for André, Clinton must give the Americans Arnold, who was then under British protection in New York. Clinton personally detested Arnold, but declined to hand him over to the Americans. From the time of his arrest, André endeared himself to the Americans, some of whom lamented his death sentence as much as the British. Alexander Hamilton in particular was thoroughly charmed by André, writing that "He united a peculiar elegance of mind and manners, and the advantage of a pleasing person".

As his date of execution approached, André appealed to Washington to be executed by firing squad as a soldier, rather than hanged as was customary for spies: "I trust that the request that I make to your Excellency at this serious period, and which is to soften my last moments, will not be rejected. Sympathy towards a soldier will surely induce your Excellency and a military tribunal to adapt the mode of my death to the feelings of a man of honor." Washington refused his request. André was hanged by the Continental Army as a spy in Tappan on October 2, 1780. According to witnesses, he placed the noose around his own neck and tightened it. The day before his hanging, André drew a likeness of himself with pen and ink, which is now owned by Yale College. A religious poem was found in his pocket after his execution, written two days beforehand. Lafayette was reported to have wept at the execution of André. Alexander Hamilton wrote of him: "Never perhaps did any man suffer death with more justice, or deserve it less."

=== Eyewitness accounts ===
An eyewitness account of André's last day can be found in the book The American Revolution: From the Commencement to the Disbanding of the American Army Given in the Form of a Daily Journal, with the Exact Dates of all the Important Events:

October 2nd. – Major André is no more among the living. I have just witnessed his exit. It was a tragical scene of the deepest interest. During his confinement and trial, he exhibited those proud and elevated sensibilities which designate greatness and dignity of mind. Not a murmur or a sigh ever escaped him, and the civilities and attentions bestowed on him were politely acknowledged. Having left a mother and two sisters in England, he was heard to mention them in terms of the tenderest affection, and in his letter to Sir Henry Clinton, he recommended them to his particular attention. The principal guard officer, who was constantly in the room with the prisoner, relates that when the hour of execution was announced to him in the morning, he received it without emotion, and while all present were affected with silent gloom, he retained a firm countenance, with calmness and composure of mind. Observing his servant enter the room in tears, he exclaimed, "Leave me till you can show yourself more manly!" His breakfast being sent to him from the table of General Washington, which had been done every day of his confinement, he partook of it as usual, and having shaved and dressed himself, he placed his hat upon the table, and cheerfully said to the guard officers, "I am ready at any moment, gentlemen, to wait on you." The fatal hour having arrived, a large detachment of troops was paraded, and an immense concourse of people assembled; almost all our general and field officers, excepting his excellency and staff, were present on horseback; melancholy and gloom pervaded all ranks, and the scene was affectingly awful. I was so near during the solemn march to the fatal spot, as to observe every movement, and participate in every emotion which the melancholy scene was calculated to produce.

A Biographical Sketch of the Most Prominent Generals by James Thacher, a surgeon in the American Revolutionary Army contains:

Major André walked from the stone house, in which he had been confined, between two of our subaltern officers, arm in arm; the eyes of the immense multitude were fixed on him, who, rising superior to the fears of death, appeared as if conscious of the dignified deportment which he displayed. He betrayed no want of fortitude, but retained a complacent smile on his countenance, and politely bowed to several gentlemen whom he knew, which was respectfully returned. It was his earnest desire to be shot, as being the mode of death most conformable to the feelings of a military man, and he had indulged the hope that his request would be granted. At the moment, therefore, when suddenly he came in view of the gallows, he involuntarily started backward, and made a pause. "Why this emotion, sir?" said an officer by his side. Instantly recovering his composure, he said, "I am reconciled to my death, but I detest the mode." While waiting and standing near the gallows, I observed some degree of trepidation; placing his foot on a stone, and rolling it over and choking in his throat, as if attempting to swallow. So soon, however, as he perceived that things were in readiness, he stepped quickly into the wagon, and at this moment he appeared to shrink, but instantly elevating his head with firmness he said, "It will be but a momentary pang," and taking from his pocket two white handkerchiefs, the provost-marshal, with one, loosely pinioned his arms, and with the other, the victim, after taking off his hat and stock, bandaged his own eyes with perfect firmness, which melted the hearts and moistened the cheeks, not only of his servant, but of the throng of spectators. The rope being appended to the gallows, he slipped the noose over his head and adjusted it to his neck, without the assistance of the awkward executioner. Colonel Scammel now informed him that he had an opportunity to speak, if he desired it; he raised the handkerchief from his eyes, and said, "I pray you to bear me witness that I meet my fate like a brave man." The wagon being now removed from under him, he was suspended, and instantly expired; it proved indeed "but a momentary pang." He was dressed in his royal regimentals and boots, and his remains, in the same dress, were placed in an ordinary coffin, and interred at the foot of the gallows; and the spot was consecrated by the tears of thousands...

== Legacy ==
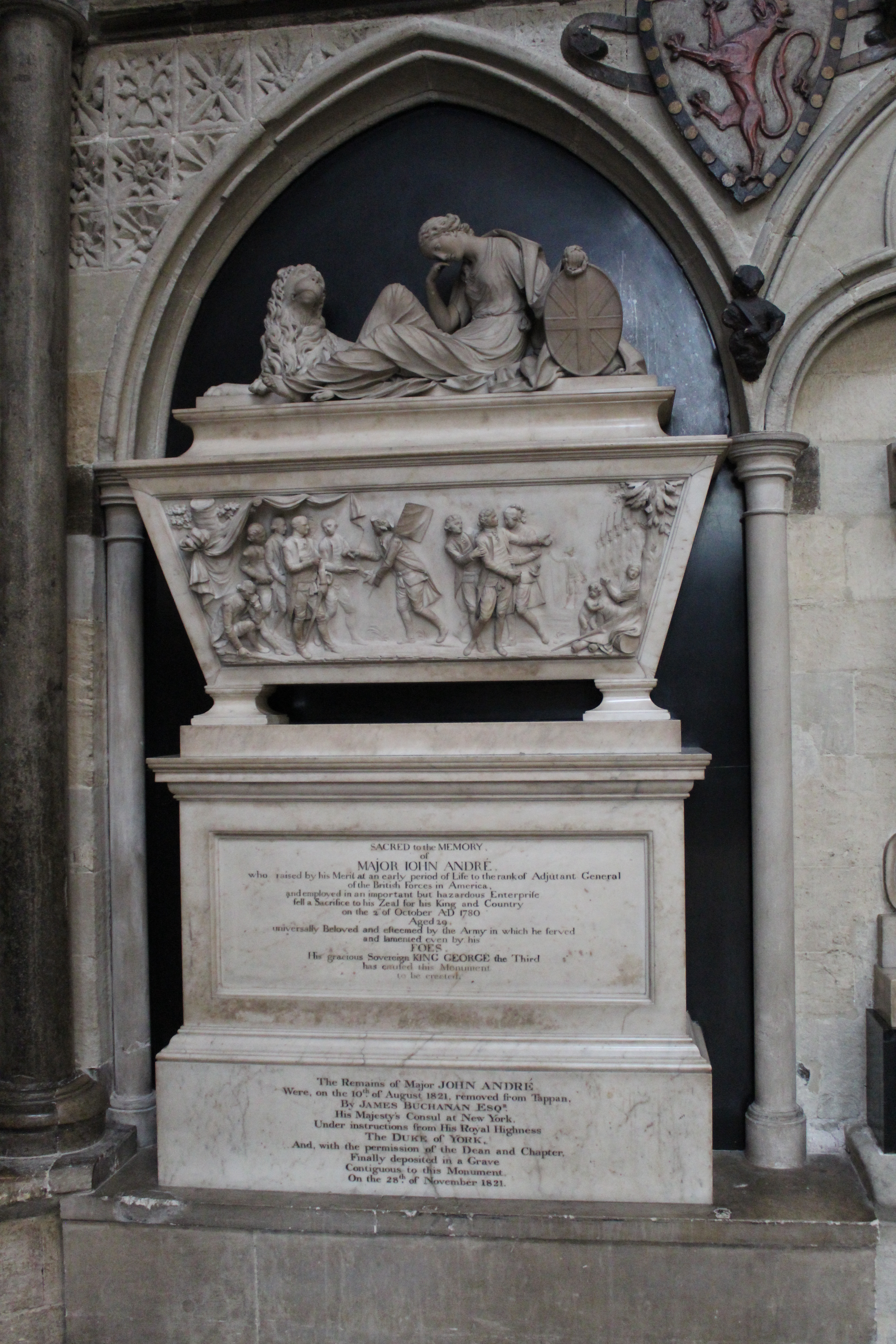
A memorial to André in Westminster Abbey

On the day of his capture, James Rivington published André's poem "The Cow Chace" in his gazette in New York. In the poem, André muses on the American defeat at the Battle of Bull's Ferry. Nathan Strickland, André's executioner, who was detained at the Continental Army camp in Tappan during André's trial due to being a Loyalist, was granted freedom for accepting the duty of hangman and returned to his home in the Ramapo Valley or Smith's Cove; nothing further of him is known. Joshua Smith, whose connections to André were discovered, was also brought to trial at the Reformed Church of Tappan. The trial lasted four weeks and ended in Smith being acquitted due to a lack of evidence. The Colquhon brothers, as well as a Continental Army major named Keirs, under whose supervision the boat was obtained, were exonerated from all suspicion.

After news of André's execution reached Great Britain, there was an outburst of anti-Americanism and American painter John Trumbull was arrested for treason, since he was known to be a former Continental Army officer of a similar rank to André. He was released after seven months of imprisonment. A pension was awarded by the British to André's mother and three sisters not long after his death; and his brother William André was made a baronet in his honor in 1781 (see André baronets). In 1804 a memorial plaque by Charles Regnart was erected in the Grosvenor Chapel in London, to André's memory. In 1821, at the behest of the Duke of York, his remains, which had been buried under the gallows, were removed to England and placed among kings and poets at Westminster Abbey, in the nave, under a marble monument depicting Britannia alongside a British lion mourning André's death. In 1879 a monument was unveiled on the place of his execution at Tappan.

The United States Congress gave each of André's captors—Paulding, Williams, and Van Wart—a silver medal, known as the Fidelity Medallion, and a pension of $200 a year. That came close to the annual pay of a Continental Army's infantry ensign in 1778. All were honored in the names of counties in Ohio, and Van Wart became the namesake of Van Wert, Ohio (the spelling of the name was modified later). In 1853, a monument was erected to their memory on the place where they captured André. It was re-dedicated in 1880 and today is located in Patriot's Park on U.S. Route 9. The memorial is along the boundary between Tarrytown and Sleepy Hollow in Westchester County. It was added to the National Register of Historic Places in 1982. One of the buildings in the towns' unified school district is today known as the John Paulding School.

== In popular culture ==
The 1798 play André, based on Major André's execution, is one of the earliest examples of American tragedy. Clyde Fitch's play Major André opened on Broadway in November 1903, but was not a success, possibly because the play attempted to portray André as a sympathetic figure.

In Washington Irving's short story, "The Legend of Sleepy Hollow", the townspeople describe the site of the capture of Major John André, in particular a tulip-tree, as one of the haunted locations in Sleepy Hollow. Ichabod Crane later passes the tree himself just before he encounters the Headless Horseman.

André has been portrayed several times in film and television:

- by Michael Wilding as an eloquent and dignified idealist in the 1955 Hollywood film The Scarlet Coat
- by JJ Feild in the TV series Turn: Washington's Spies
- by William Beckley in season 4, episode 26 of the sci-fi TV series Voyage to the Bottom of the Sea
- by Eric Joshua Davis in the TV series Sleepy Hollow
- by John Light in the movie Benedict Arnold: A Question of Honor.
- by Derek Waters on Drunk History Season 2 Episode 8. Winona Ryder portrays Peggy Shippen and Chris Parnell, Benedict Arnold.

== See also ==
- Intelligence in the American Revolutionary War
- John Champe (soldier)
- Jane Tuers

== Works cited ==
- An Authentic Narrative of the Causes Which Led to the Death of Major Andre, Adjutant-General of His Majesty's Forces in North America, Joshua Hett Smith (London 1808)
- Cray, Robert E. Jr., "Major John Andre and the Three Captors: Class Dynamics and Revolutionary Memory Wars in the Early Republic, 1780–1831", Journal of the Early Republic, Vol. 17, No. 3. Autumn, 1997. University of Pennsylvania Press.
- Flexner, James Thomas (1953). The Traitor and the Spy: Benedict Arnold and John André. New York: Harcourt Brace. OCLC 426158.
- Memoirs of the Historical Society of Pennsylvania (1858), vol VI, which contains a comprehensive essay by Charles J. Biddle
- Andreana, H. W. Smith (Philadelphia, 1865)
- Two spies, Lossing (New York, 1886)
- Life and Career of Major John André, Sargent, new edition (New York, 1904)
- The Secret is Out: True Spy Stories, T. Martini (Boston, 1990) ISBN 978-0-316-54864-9
- The Execution of Major Andre, John Evangelist Walsh (New York, 2001) ISBN 978-0-312-23889-6
- Local History: British Agent Detained in Tarrytown, Executed in Rockland
- Fleming, Thomas (February–March 2000), George Washington, Spymaster, American Heritage Magazine, archived from the original on 18 February 2008
- Raymond, Marcius D. (1903), David Williams and the capture of Andre: A paper read before the Tarrytown Historical Society
- Reynolds, Larry J. (Spring 1992), "Patriot and Criminals, Criminal and Patriots: Representations of the Case of Major Andre", South Central Review, vol. 9, Historicizing Literary Contexts, pp. 57–84, doi:10.2307/3189387, ISSN 0743-6831, JSTOR 3189387
- Trees, Andy (2000), "Benedict Arnold, John André, and His Three Yeoman Captors: A Sentimental Journey or American Virtue Defined", Early American Literature, 35 (3), The University of North Carolina Press: 246, doi:10.1353/eal.2000.0011, S2CID 162302291
