= Henry M. Peck House =

Historic house in New York, United States

- U.S. National Register of Historic Places
- Location within New York Location within the United States
- Location: US 9W at Helen Hayes Hospital, West Haverstraw, New York
- Coordinates: 41°12′44″N 73°59′18″W
- Area: less than one acre
- Built: 1865
- Architectural style: Second Empire
- NRHP reference No.: 00001279
- Added to NRHP: November 2, 2000

Henry M. Peck House was a historic home located at West Haverstraw in Rockland County, New York. It was built about 1865 and is a large two-story, wood-frame dwelling on a stone foundation. It featured an S-curved mansard roof sheathed in slate in the Second Empire style. It also had a central projecting entrance / tower bay and two-story gable-roofed kitchen / servant wing.

It was listed on the National Register of Historic Places in 2000.

It was destroyed by fire on July 3, 2002.
