= Glebe House (Poughkeepsie, New York) =

Historic house in New York, United States

- U.S. National Register of Historic Places
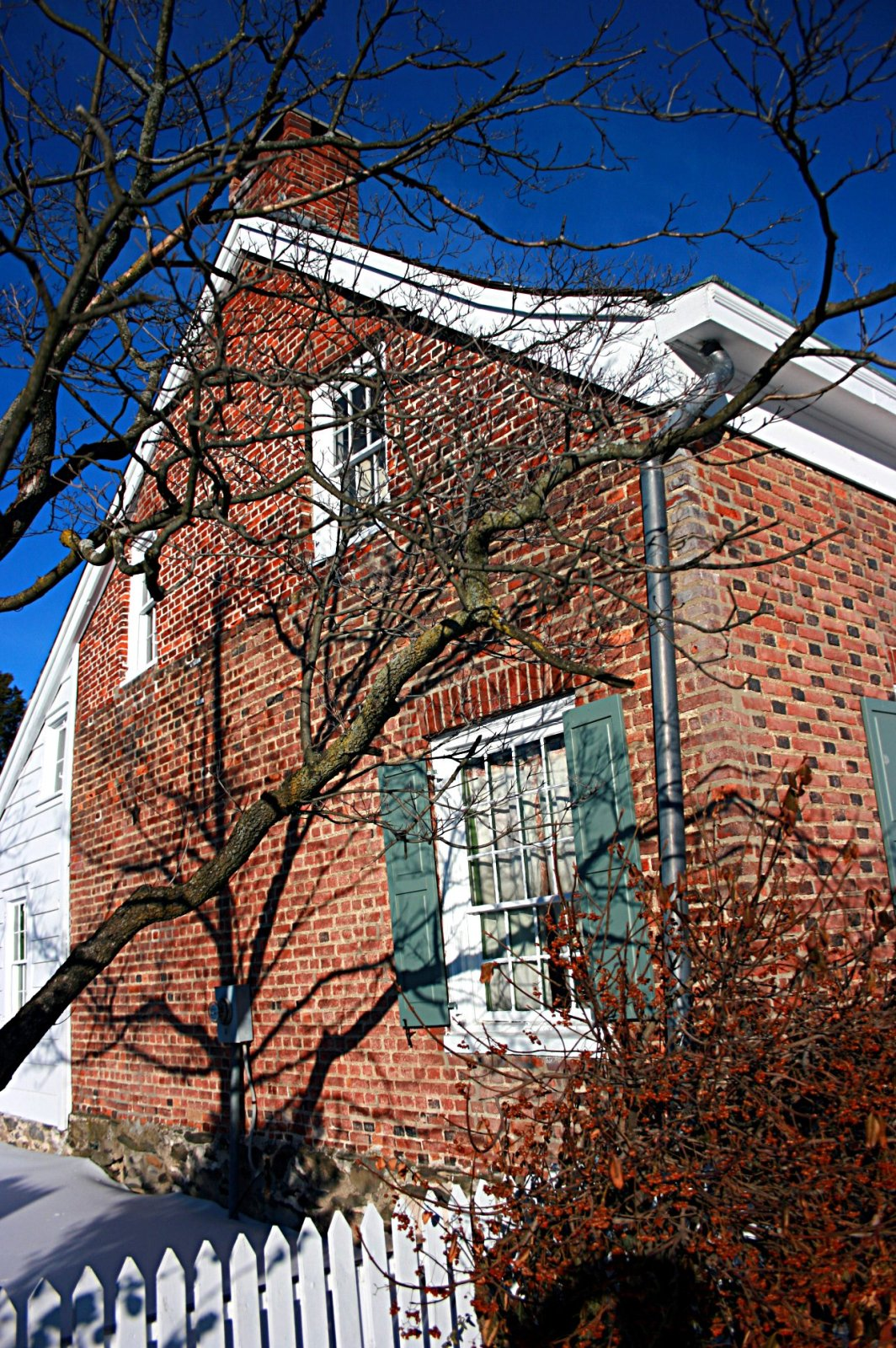
- Glebe House in March 2007

- Location within New York Location within the United States
- Location: 635 Main Street, Poughkeepsie, Dutchess County, New York, United States
- Coordinates: 41°41′54″N 73°54′44″W
- Area: less than one acre
- Built: 1767
- Architectural style: Georgian
- MPS: Poughkeepsie MRA
- NRHP reference No.: 82001139
- Added to NRHP: November 26, 1982

The Glebe House is an 18th-century Georgian brick building in Poughkeepsie, Dutchess County, New York, USA. It is listed in the National Register of Historic Places as a historic place of local significance since 1982.

The name "Glebe House" refers to the glebe, an area of land the proceeds of which supported the parish and its minister. The land associated with Glebe House was about 1 square kilometre (250 acres) in size.

The Glebe House itself was constructed in 1767 as a Georgian red brick building on a rubble stone foundation. It was to serve rectory for the Reverend John Beardsley, who ministered at Christ Church, Poughkeepsie and Trinity Church in Fishkill and his family in 1767. Since Beardsley was a Loyalist, he and his entire household were forced to flee to New York City in December 1777 to seek the protection of the British during the American Revolutionary War.

After 1777, the house and the land passed through many hands. During this time, it housed a public beer garden and later a florist business. In the early 19th century, an addition to the building was made by Peter De Reimer.

In 1929, the house and the remainder of the glebe land (now less than 1 acre) were purchased by members of the Dutchess County Historical Society and the Junior League to protect it from demolition. The house was given to the City of Poughkeepsie to be operated jointly by the Dutchess County Historical Society and the Junior League.

The Dutchess County Historical Society was involved with the house from 1929 to 2016. Now home to Fall Kill Creative Works.

== See also ==
- National Register of Historic Places listings in Poughkeepsie, New York
