= Washington's Headquarters State Historic Site =

- Washington's Headquarters; State Historic Site
- U.S. National Register of Historic Places
- U.S. National Historic Landmark
- New York State Register of Historic Places
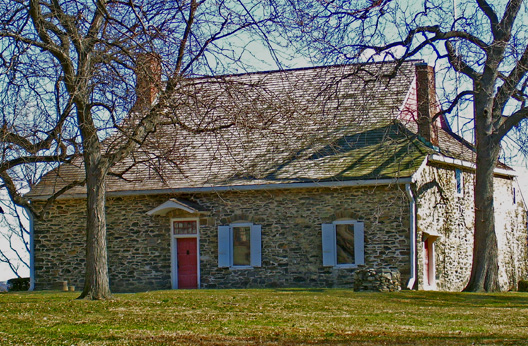
- West (front) elevation, 2006

- Location within New York
- Interactive map showing Washington’s Headquarters
- Location: Newburgh, New York
- Coordinates: 41°29′52″N 74°00′36″W
- Area: 7 acres (2.8 hectares)
- Built: 1750-1770
- Architectural style: Dutch Colonial, Federal Revival
- Website: https://parks.ny.gov/historic-sites/17/details.aspx
- NRHP reference No.: 66000887
- NYSRHP No.: 07140.000021

Significant dates
- Added to NRHP: October 15, 1966
- Designated NHL: January 20, 1961
- Designated NYSRHP: June 23, 1980

Washington's Headquarters State Historic Site, also called Hasbrouck House, is located in Newburgh, New York, United States, overlooking the Hudson River. George Washington and his staff were headquartered in the house while commanding the Continental Army during the final year and a half of the American Revolutionary War; at 16 months and 19 days it was his longest tenure at any of his headquarters during the war.

Purchased by New York State in 1850, it is the first property acquired and preserved by any U.S. state for historic reasons. It is the oldest house still extant in the city of Newburgh, and was added to the National Register of Historic Places in 1966.

== Early history (1750–1782) ==
The land upon which Washington's Headquarters would later sit was first owned by Michael Wygand. Labelled as "Lot Number 2" of the original land patent (known as the "German Patent") that would evolve into Newburgh, the first fieldstone farmhouse on the site may have been built in 1725 by Burger Mynderse, who purchased the lot from Wygand. Mynderse in turn sold the lot, comprising some 200 acres, to Elsie Hasbrouck of New Paltz, New York in 1750. Her son, Jonathan, likely constructed a new three-room fieldstone house that same year and moved into it. In 1751 Jonathan married Tryntje Dubois, and in 1753 Elsie transferred the deed to the lands to her son. An addition was completed on the southern side of the house in 1760, before the house was doubled in size with a final addition completed in 1770 on the western side. The Hasbroucks originally maintained a large stock farm on their property before venturing into other business; in the 1760s they constructed a gristmill on the far western end of their property along Quassaic Creek. A few years later they constructed a dock on the Hudson River to trade directly with New York City.

The home is built in the Dutch Vernacular style, with notable "Dutch Jambless" fireplaces featured prominently throughout. While it is known that the Hasbrouck family used the oldest 1750 Jambless fireplace as their kitchen, there is evidence that a brick fireplace with a connected Dutch oven existed in the 1770 addition and was used by the Hasbroucks as their kitchen after the addition. As that fireplace was removed after the state's acquisition of the site, it is hard to know with any degree of certainty.

== Washington's Headquarters (1782–1783) ==
On April 1, 1782, General George Washington took up residence at the Newburgh farmhouse of the Hasbrouck family, making Newburgh the Continental Army's headquarters; he remained officially headquartered there until August 19, 1783, when he departed for Rockingham, the house of John Berrien in Rocky Hill, New Jersey. Although the Hasbrouck house remained his official headquarters for this period, he did not in fact reside in the house for the entire time; he made numerous trips to Philadelphia, Albany, Verplanck's Point, Tappan, West Point, Dobbs Ferry, and Kingston to tend to various Army and governmental matters. Additionally, between July 18 and August 5, 1783, Washington toured much of the Northern theater of the war, including the Saratoga Battlefields, Fort Ticonderoga, Fort Stanwix, and other battle sites that he did not personally witness. Despite these departures he remained officially headquartered at the Hasbrouck House for 16.5 months, making it his longest stay at any of his wartime headquarters.

Prior to Washington's arrival, the Army made a number of changes and improvements to the house to better serve the General's needs. A temporary kitchen was constructed detached from the house, roughly where the gravel path separating the House and the Museum sits today. There may have been an icehouse constructed near the new kitchen as well. Existing buildings such as stables and barns were also enlarged and improved for Army use. Other changes were made inside the house during Washington's residence, including the addition of an "English" style fireplace in General Washington's bedroom, as well as a new door that led directly to the exterior kitchen. Most Army buildings were removed by the Quartermaster-General's Office at the end of the war, with the exception of a "House in the garden", which was given to Mrs. Hasbrouck. It no longer exists.

Throughout his time at Newburgh, Washington was assisted in his daily duties by nine different aides-de-camp, eight of whom worked and lived within Headquarters alongside him. All nine were in service for roughly one month, from May–June 1782; by the time of Washington's departure on August 19, 1783, only six remained. They were:

- Lieutenant Colonel Tench Tilghman, August 8, 1776 - December 23, 1783.
- Lieutenant Colonel David Humphreys, June 23, 1780 - December 23, 1783.
- Lieutenant Colonel Richard Varick, May 25, 1781 - December 23, 1783.
- Lieutenant Colonel David Cobb, June 15, 1781 - January 1783, then again June 1783 - December 23, 1783.
- Colonel William Stephens Smith, July 6, 1781 - June 1782
- Ensign George Augustine Washington, Washington's nephew, as a volunteer aide-de-camp, December 1781 - May 1782.
- Benjamin Walker, uncertain rank, January 25, 1782 - December 23, 1783.
- Major Hodijah Baylies, May 14, 1782 - December 23, 1783.
- Pierre Penet, a French merchant confirmed by Congress as a brevet aide-de-camp, October 14, 1776 - January 1783. Penet was appointed to this position by Washington at his headquarters in Harlem Heights, but soon returned to France where he carried out arms sales to the American commissioners, still nominally as an aide-de-camp to Washington.

While Washington was headquartered in Newburgh the main bulk of the Continental Army was encamped nearby at the New Windsor Cantonment near what is today known as Vails Gate, a few miles to the southwest. There were roughly 7,500 troops of the Army as well as 500 women and children as camp followers.

=== Newburgh Letter ===
In March 1782, Washington received the infamous Newburgh letter from Lewis Nicola. Nicola, serving as the head of the Invalid Corps, alerted Washington to the discontent amongst his enlisted men, and their discussions about possibly refusing to disband in the event of a general peace. Nicola then elaborated on his political sentiments; criticized the Congress of the Confederation, declaring the body to be inherently weak as he believed all republican governments would be; he particularly highlighted the government's inability to secure funds and supplies for his troops, as well as the larger army in general, as proof of this. Nicola then proposed a "scheme" in which veterans of the war would move to new lands in the West, and there a new government could be formed for the United States. This government, Nicola declared, should be a monarchy, as he believed such a government would be strong and beneficial for the country: "Some people have so connected the ideas of tyranny & monarchy as to find it very difficult to separate them, it may therefore be requisite to give the head of such a constitution as I propose, some title apparently more moderate, but if all other things were once adjusted I believe strong arguments might be produced for admitting the title of king...". While Nicola never explicitly suggested that Washington should become the king of the United States, it was heavily implied; Nicola took special care to point out that "the same abilities which have lead us, through difficulties apparently unsurmountable by human power, to victory & glory... would be most likely to conduct & direct us in the smoother paths of peace."

In his response, Washington strongly rejected Nicola's suggestion, as he was acutely aware of people's fears of an "American Cromwell," and had no desire to be a monarch. In his reply, Washington said that "No incident in the course of the war in me triggers painful feelings as your message, that such ideas are circulating in the army, as you expressed it." Washington ordered Nicola to " banish these thoughts from your Mind, & never communicate, as from yourself, or any one else, a sentiment of the like nature." Nicola was distraught at Washington's rebuff, and would write three letters of apology to Washington over the next six days. There is no evidence that Washington ever responded to these letters of apology.

In honor of that rejection, Kings Highway, the north–south street on which the Newburgh headquarters is located was later renamed Liberty Street.

=== Asgill Affair ===
During the period of Washington's travel to and arrival at Headquarters Newburgh, a scandal erupted involving Patriot and Loyalist militias in New Jersey that reached far beyond into the royal courts of Europe. In March, 1782, Patriot militiamen executed Loyalist Philip White; while the exact circumstances of his death are unclear owing to contradictory accounts, the execution inflamed local Loyalist forces. In retaliation, a Loyalist militia in Monmouth, New Jersey, executed Patriot militia Captain Jack Huddy, despite Huddy's absence from the White execution and general innocence. Patriot forces subsequently sent a petition to Washington demanding justice, insinuating that they would carry out whatever justice they felt necessary should Washington fail to. On May 3, 1782, Washington ordered General Moses Hazen, commander of a prisoner-of-war camp in Lancaster, Pennsylvania, to select from the prisoners an officer not protected by any agreement with Great Britain, and of equal rank to Captain Huddy, to be executed by hanging. When no such prisoner was found, Washington ordered that a protected officer may be hanged. This order, if carried out, would put the United States in direct violation of the terms of Cornwallis' surrender at the Siege of Yorktown, which protected prisoners of war from retaliation. After drawing lots, Captain Charles Asgill was selected for execution. After many months of international political maneuvering, mediation and intervention, including the intervention of the French King Louis XVI through his foreign minister Charles Gravier, comte de Vergennes, Asgill's execution was commuted, and the international scandal, which might've caused irreparable harm to the cause of American independence as well as to Washington's character, was avoided.

=== Badge of Military Merit ===
On August 7, 1782, Washington issued a general order which established the Badge of Military Merit, which could be awarded to enlisted men and non-commissioned officers for long and faithful service and for acts of heroism. Still, despite its vague wording, it was only awarded to three men, all non-commissioned officers. On May 3, 1783, it was awarded to Sergeant William Brown of the 5th Connecticut Regiment of the Connecticut Line and Sergeant Elijah Churchill of the 2nd Regiment Light Dragoons. Then on June 10, 1783, it was awarded to Sergeant Daniel Bissell of the 2nd Connecticut Regiment of the Connecticut Line. General Washington awarded the Badge to its recipients personally on the front lawn of Newburgh Headquarters. It is widely considered to be the first military decoration for the United States, and is the second oldest in the world (after the Order of St. George).

Largely forgotten about for a century and a half, on 10 October 1927, Army Chief of Staff General Charles Pelot Summerall directed that a draft bill be sent to Congress "to revive the Badge of Military Merit". The bill was withdrawn and action on the case ceased on 3 January 1928, but the office of the Adjutant General was instructed to file all materials collected for possible future use. A number of private interests sought to have the medal re-instituted in the Army; this included the board of directors of the Fort Ticonderoga Museum in Ticonderoga, New York. On 7 January 1931, Summerall's successor, General Douglas MacArthur, confidentially reopened work on a new design, involving the Washington Commission of Fine Arts. Elizabeth Will, an Army heraldic specialist in the Office of the Quartermaster General, was named to redesign the newly revived medal, which became known as the Purple Heart. Using general specifications provided to her, Will created the design sketch for the present medal of the Purple Heart. The new design, which exhibits a bust and profile of George Washington, was issued on the bicentennial of Washington's birth.

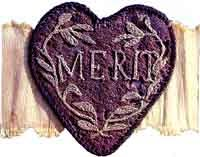
Badge of Military Merit

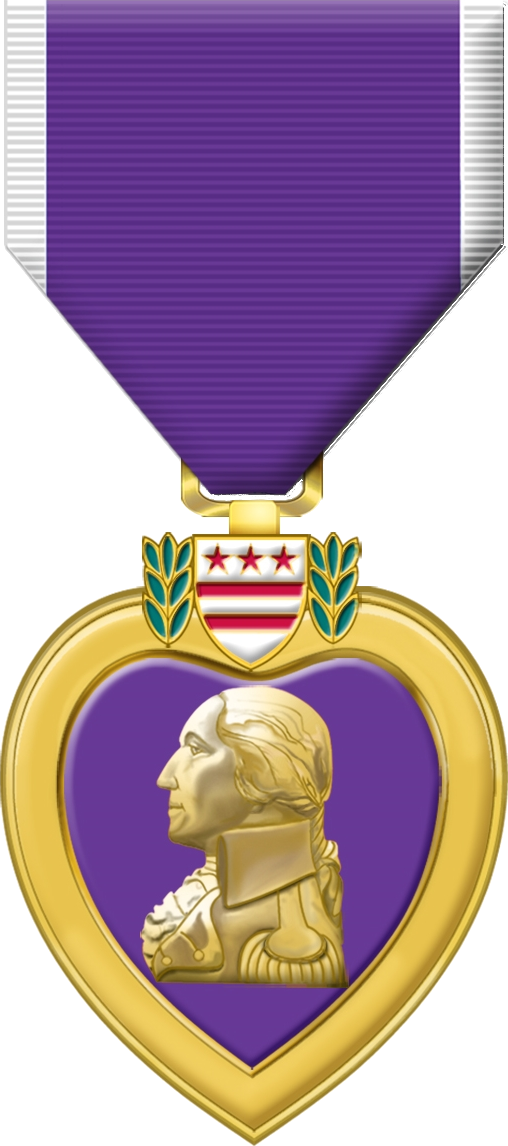
Purple Heart

=== Verplanck's Point ===
On August 31, Washington temporarily departed Newburgh Headquarters and marched the army southward to Verplanck's Point. There, Washington staged a review of the Continental Army as an honor for the French Commander-in-Chief Comte de Rochambeau and his army, who had arrived there a few days prior on their way to Boston, where Rochambeau would hand over command of his army and return to France, and the army would depart for the West Indies to attack British colonies there. The Continental Army put on their best uniforms and paraded in an excellent manner. Washington wrote of the display:

As the intention of drawing out the troops tomorrow is to compliment his Excellency the Count de Rochambeau; The troops as he passes them shall pay him the honors due the commander in chief... On this occasion the tallest men are to be in the front rank.

A few days later, the French and American armies departed, and Washington resumed his residence at the Hasbrouck House.

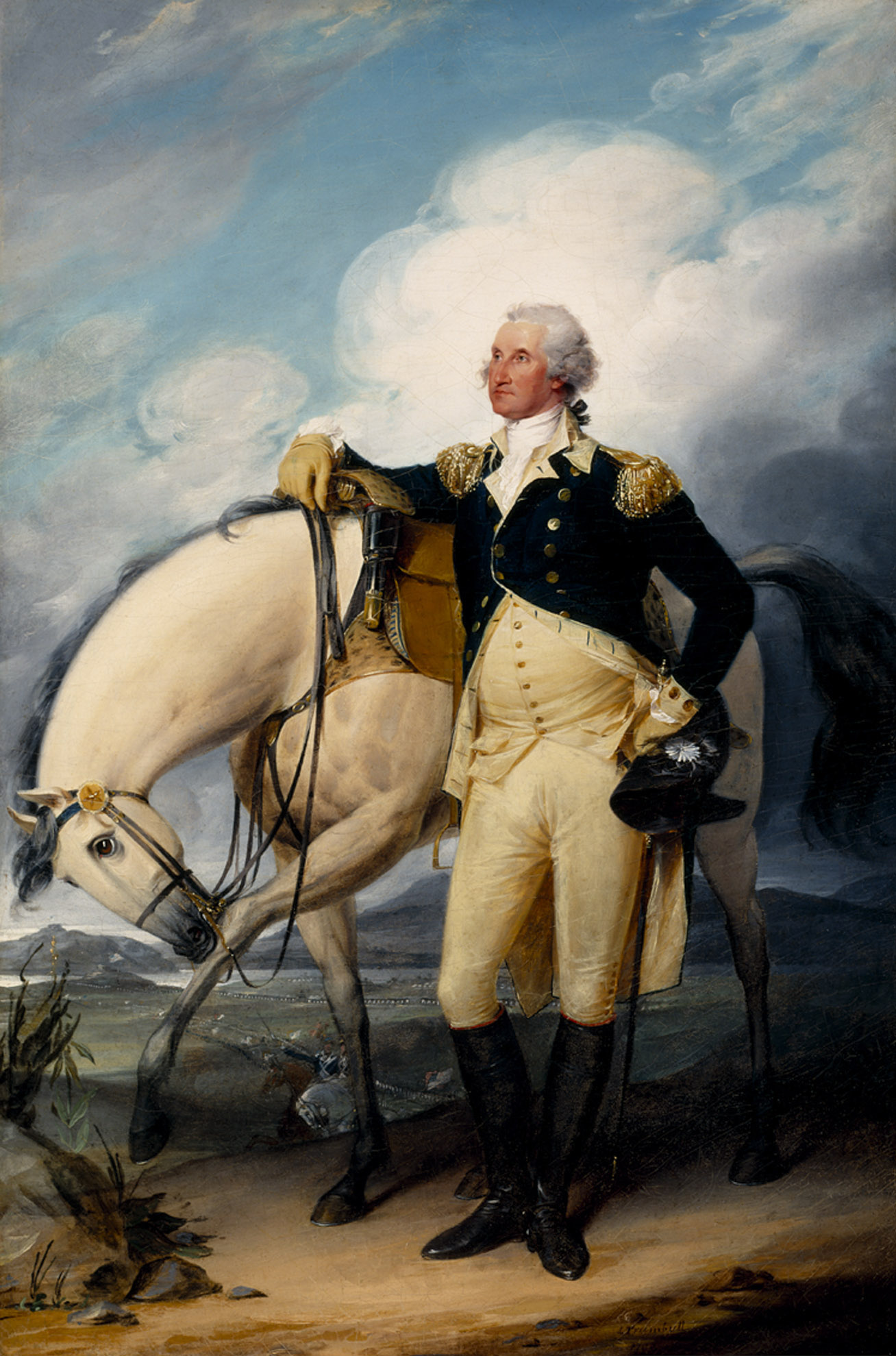
Washington at Verplanck's Point, by John Trumbull

=== Washington and Rochambeau's final meeting ===
After Rochambeau relinquished control of his army in Boston, he passed through Newburgh on his way to Philadelphia, where he would depart for France. This would be the last meeting of Generals Washington and Rochambeau, the victors of Yorktown.

French Major General François Jean de Beauvoir, Marquis de Chastellux, who often served as a liaison between Rochambeau and Washington, arrived at Newburgh Headquarters two days before Rochambeau in anticipation of Rochambeau's arrival. Years later, in 1786, Chastellux would publish his personal diaries that he kept during his travels throughout the United States during the Revolution, in which he writes about Newburgh Headquarters in some detail. Titled Voyages de M. le Marquis de Chastellux dans l'Amérique septentrionale, dans les années 1780, 1781 et 1782 (Travels of Mr. the Marquis de Chastellux in North America in the years 1780, 1781, 1782) he writes that he arrived to Newburgh Headquarters at six o'clock in the evening on December 5, 1782, where he found "Mr. and Mrs. Washington, Colonel Tilghman, Colonel Humphreys, and Major Walker" in conversation in the parlor. He described the headquarters house as "neither spacious nor convenient, which is built in the Dutch fashion", how the dining room "is in truth fairly spacious, but it has seven doors and only one window, and how "the fireplace, or rather the fireback, is against the walls, so that there is in fact but one vent for the smoke, and the fire in the room itself." The parlor was then converted into a bedroom for Chastellux, with the sitting furniture removed and a camp bed erected for him. The next day, December 6, was passed at the table or in conversation, and Chastellux dispatched a messenger across the river to ask General Rochambeau to stay the night somewhere there, as there would not be enough space at headquarters for Rochambeau.

Chastellux departed Newburgh Headquarters on the following morning of December 7, just as General Rochambeau was arriving. Numerous letters and accounts attest to this. Chastellux wrote that Rochambeau "did not join us until the next morning just as I was setting out." In a letter to the French Ambassador Anne-César de La Luzerne dated December 6, 1782, Washington writes, "I expect the Count de Rochambeau tomorrow..." The following day, Washington pens a letter to French Admiral Louis-Philippe de Rigaud, Marquis de Vaudreuil, who was second in command of the French fleet in America, in which he states that "The Count de Rochambeau, who arrived here this morning, did me the honor to deliver me your letter..." It is unknown how long Rochambeau remained at Newburgh Headquarters, nor the topics of their conversation. Still, as Rochambeau departed soon thereafter from Philadelphia for France and never returned to the United States, this marks the final meeting between the two victors of the Siege of Yorktown.

=== Newburgh Conspiracy ===
In March 1783, feeling embittered over their lack of payment from Congress and secretly manipulated by a faction of nationalist politicians in Philadelphia (usually given as Robert Morris, Gouverneur Morris, and Alexander Hamilton), senior officers of the army encamped at the nearby New Windsor Cantonment anonymously authored and began circulating a letter that called for a meeting of all field officers and company representatives to decide what course of action the army should take against Congress. The letter's author advocated for an ultimatum stating that if peace was declared and the officers were still unpaid, they would refuse to disband the army and possibly march against Congress. This would effectively be a military mutiny against the civilian government, that could rapidly devolve into a military coup d'état. Now known to be the work of Major John Armstrong, Jr., an aide-de-camp of General Horatio Gates, this letter inflamed tensions amongst the officers to dangerous new levels and began what is now known as the Newburgh Conspiracy. Washington, fearing an armed confrontation would be too grave a threat to democracy, confronted the threat head on. After delivering the Newburgh Address and reading aloud a letter from Congressman Joseph Jones of Virginia, he was able to persuade his officers abandon the conspiracy and to instead remain loyal to Congress, to him, and to their republican principles.

=== Proclamation for the Cessation of Hostilities ===
A month later, on April 18, Washington wrote the Proclamation for the Cessation of Hostilities; reading it aloud before his troops the next day, he formally announced the preliminary peace treaty with the United Kingdom, and ordered the army to officially stand down. This marked the effective end of the fighting of the American Revolution, exactly 8 years later to the day since the fighting began at the Battles of Lexington and Concord. He made sure to note, though, that while this did not amount to a "general peace," they should still celebrate and give thanks for the peace:

Although the proclamation before alluded to, extends only to the prohibition of Hostilities, and not of the annunciation, of a general peace; yet it must afford the most rational, and sincere satisfaction, to every benevolent mind. As it puts a period, to a long and doubtful test, stops the effusion of human blood, opens the prospect to a more sp[len]did scene; and like another morning Star; promises the approach of a brighter day, than hath hitherto illuminated the Western Hemisphere—On such a happy day, a day which is the harbinger of peace, a day which completes the eighth year of the War, it would be ingratitude not to rejoice! it would be insensibility not to participate in the general felicity.

=== Circular Letter to the States ===
In the summer of 1783, as peace with Great Britain in the wake of the cessation of hostilities is slowly taking shape, Washington penned an open letter in which he offered advice on the necessary requirements to achieve success as a new nation. Titled "Circular Letter to the States", Washington began by extolling the advantages of their country, as due to its great size it would have an abundance of natural resources. Even more important, he said, was that the country founded in the Age of Enlightenment, and so the principles of liberty, self-government, and equality would thrive as they embarked on the first experiment of republicanism in the modern era. Still, Washington warned the country of the consequences of not living up to expectations. He believed that they held in their hands the responsibility for "unborn millions"; the world would be watching their great republican experiment, and if they succeeded, they would prove that monarchy was a system of the past. Conversely, if they failed, they would be mocked as foolish, and republicanism would be marked as a failure.

Washington then proceeded to elaborate on four necessities for the country's success. First, while states must remain individually strong, there must be a strong federal government to keep the country together; he strongly believed that the success of the country was directly tied to the strength of the Union. Second, he insisted that all debts incurred during the American Revolution should be repaid in full as soon as possible so the country did not have to declare bankruptcy. To do this, the States must finally pay their share of funds to the national government, which they frequently failed to do during the war. Additionally, all money owed to soldiers and army officers must be paid in full.

Third, he advised that the militia be of a high, uniform standard throughout the nation. Since it was the primary defense of the republic, the militia of every state should be well-outfitted and regularly trained.

Finally, he encouraged the country's citizens to look past their state divisions and see themselves as one, unified people. Rather than identifying with their home state, he said they should simply view themselves as Americans, and that they should be willing “to sacrifice their individual advantages to the interest of the Community.”

Washington closed the letter by reminding the country of his qualifications to offer such advice, and expressed his desire to peacefully retire from public life.

== Post-war (1783–1850) ==
Following Washington's departure, the house was returned to Mrs. Hasbrouck, and she remained until her death. The house then became the property of Isaac Hasbrouck, the third son of Jonathan and Tryntje. Upon Isaac's death in 1806, the land was divided between his five children. Small plots went to his three daughters, but most of the land was divided between his two sons, Jonathan III and Eli, with Jonathan III receiving the house.

Jonathan III married Phoebe Field and together had eleven children. In 1817, he purchased his brother Eli's land for $15,000. Two of his daughters, Ann Eliza and Israela, opened a school within the house in 1833 to educate local women in the traditional English style. Occasionally, the Hasbroucks took on boarders as well.

In the wake of the Panic of 1837 Jonathan III fell on hard times, and the house was put up for sale. His advertisement pitched the house as "the most ancient and durable building above the Highlands and for comfort and convenience unequalled by any building on the Hudson River," with a "splendid view of Highland scenery." With the realization of its historical significance slowly growing in the region, many efforts were proposed to preserve the house as a historic site. Washington Irving wrote of his desire to preserve the house, and in 1839 a corporation composed of Newburgh residents was formed to buy the house and preserve it, but their charter lapsed before any real efforts could be accomplished. Meanwhile, Jonathan's financial situation continued to worsen and he was forced to take a $2,000 loan in the form of a mortgage from the Loan Commissioners of the State of New York, administrators of the U.S. Deposit Fund. In 1848, Jonathan defaulted on the due interest payment, so the house was foreclosed and put up for sale, and Jonathan was forced to move with his wife and son to New York City. As there were consequently no bidders, the Loan Commissioners took possession for the State of New York.

Under the leadership of Andrew J. Caldwell, the Loan Commissioners were by now committed to the preservation of the house as a public historic site. Caldwell contacted Governor Hamilton Fish, who enthusiastically supported the project. In October 1849, Fish wrote that he favored "securing this hallowed spot for some public object suitable and appropriate to its history." Public approval in Orange County was strong for the site's preservation, and subsequently a bill was introduced into the state legislature and, on April 10, 1850, Governor Fish signed into law "An Act for the Preservation of Washington's Headquarters."

== The first historic site (1850–Present) ==
When the State of New York purchased the house in 1850, it became the first publicly operated historic site in the country at either the federal or state level. It opened to the public on July 4, 1850. Major General Winfield Scott raised a flag at the opening ceremony and dedication. Over the next 60 years, many artifacts were donated to the site from across the world and across history; with no dedicated museum space or gallery, they were all displayed within the historic headquarters, thereby neglecting the story of the house itself. Finally, in 1910, with the headquarters house now overflowing with artifacts, the State constructed a two-story brick building in the Federal Revival style adjacent to the house to serve as an artifact museum and visitor center. Today, the Hasbrouck House is furnished to recreate its condition during General Washington's residence. Most items inside are reproduction, but a few are noteworthy artifacts with ties to Washington.

The site covers an area of about seven acres (2.8 hectares), with four buildings: the Hasbrouck House (headquarters), the 1910 museum, a monument named the "Tower of Victory" completed in 1887, and a maintenance shed/garage built in the Colonial Revival style in 1942.

The site was declared a National Historic Landmark in 1961.

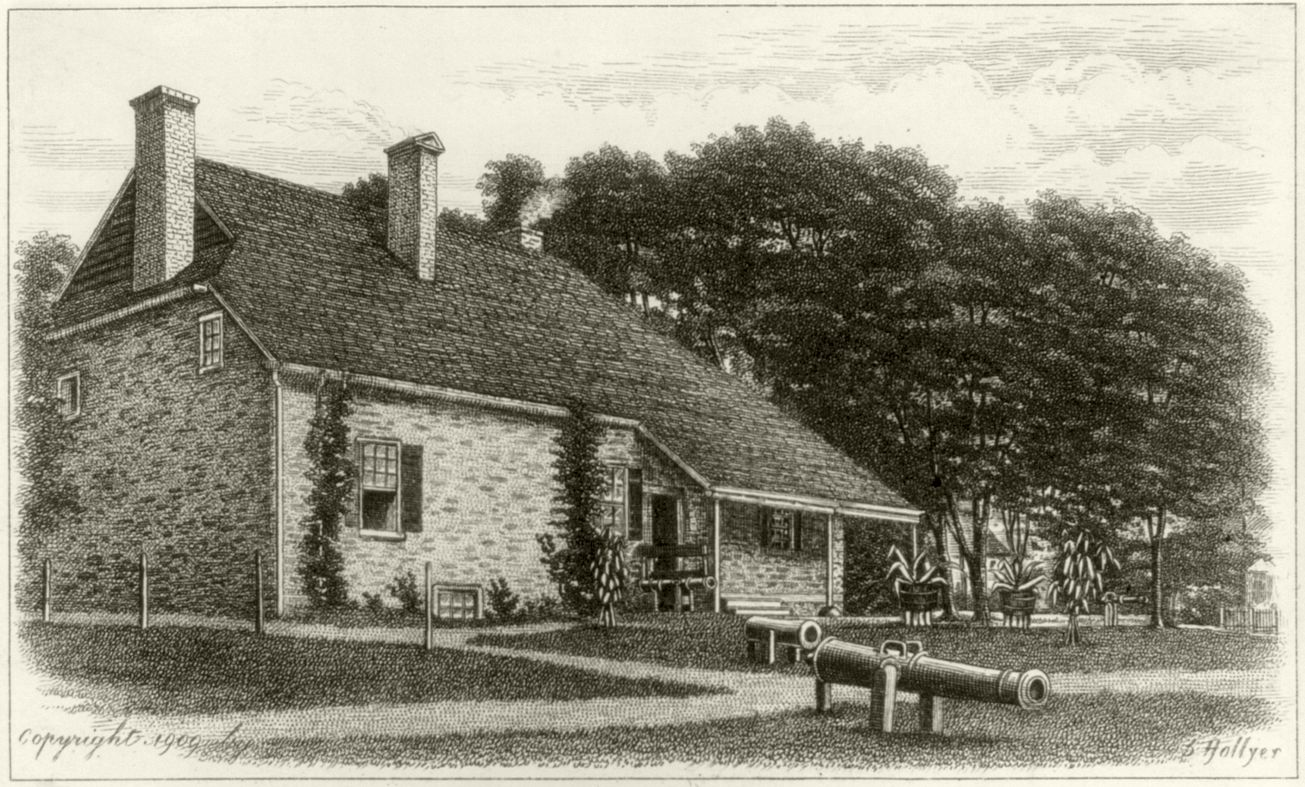
Engraving of Hasbrouck House

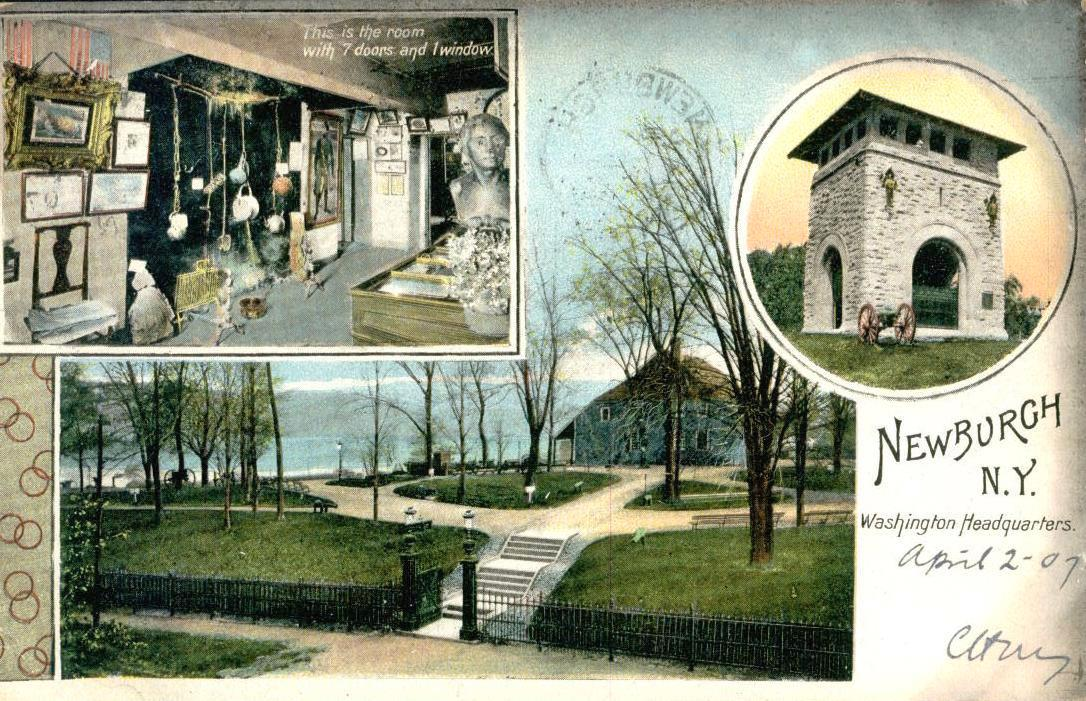
1907 postcard of Washington's Headquarters SHS

=== Tower of Victory ===
On the northeast corner of the site grounds is a large stone monument called the Tower of Victory. Opened to the public in 1887, it commemorates the centennial of the successful disbandment of the Continental Army. The date of the Army's disbandment is given on the dedication plaque of the Tower as October 13, 1783; construction on the Tower was delayed, so it did in fact miss the centennial that it was meant to celebrate by four years.

The Tower was a joint Federal and State project and a special commission was created to oversee its planning, design and construction, with then-Secretary of War Robert Todd Lincoln, Abraham Lincoln's son, chosen to lead it. The commission selected architect John H. Duncan to design the monument, who would later go on to greater renown for designing the tomb of President Ulysses S. Grant in Manhattan. Duncan briefly considered an obelisk for the Tower, but as the Washington Monument in Washington, D.C. was languishing in construction limbo for over 30 years, he instead settled on the current design. It is meant to be a crude but imposing structure, reminiscent of the revolutionary times, that is surmounted by an accessible outlook which is open to the public through guided tours.

There are four bronze statues on the exterior of the Tower, two facing the West and two facing the East, meant to represent the "four pillars" of the Continental Army. Sculpted by William Rudolf O'Donovan in 1888, the statues depict a Rifleman (Northeast corner), a Light Dragoon (Southeast corner), an Artilleryman (Northwest corner), and Infantry Line Officer (Southwest corner). Inside the atrium of the Tower was a life-sized statue of George Washington, also sculpted by O'Donovan. Small cracks were discovered during routine maintenance of the statue in 2020, so it is currently off-site undergoing repairs.

In 1950, hurricane-force winds blew up the Hudson River and tore the original roof off of the Tower. The monument closed, pending repairs; sufficient funds were not raised until 2019, and finally a new roof was installed.

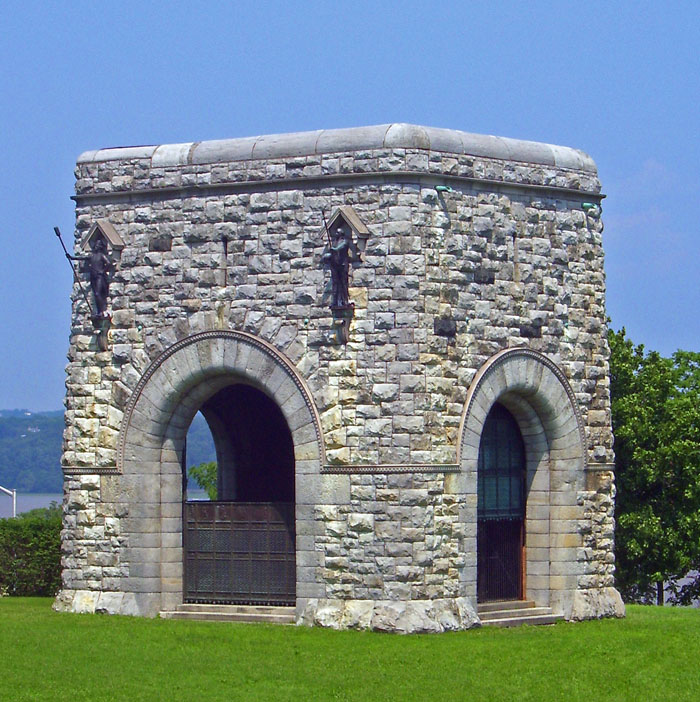
The Tower of Victory 1950–2019

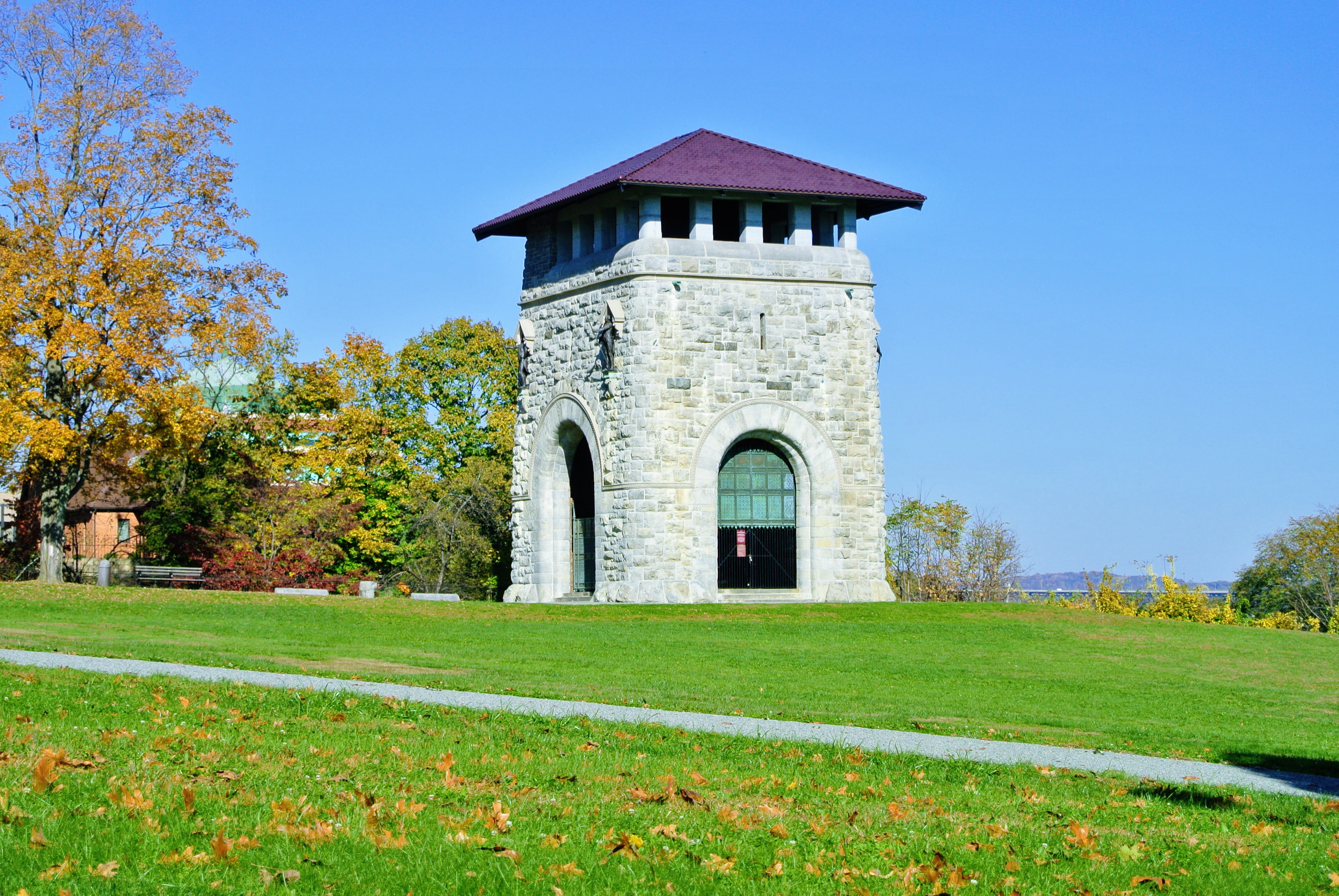
Current View

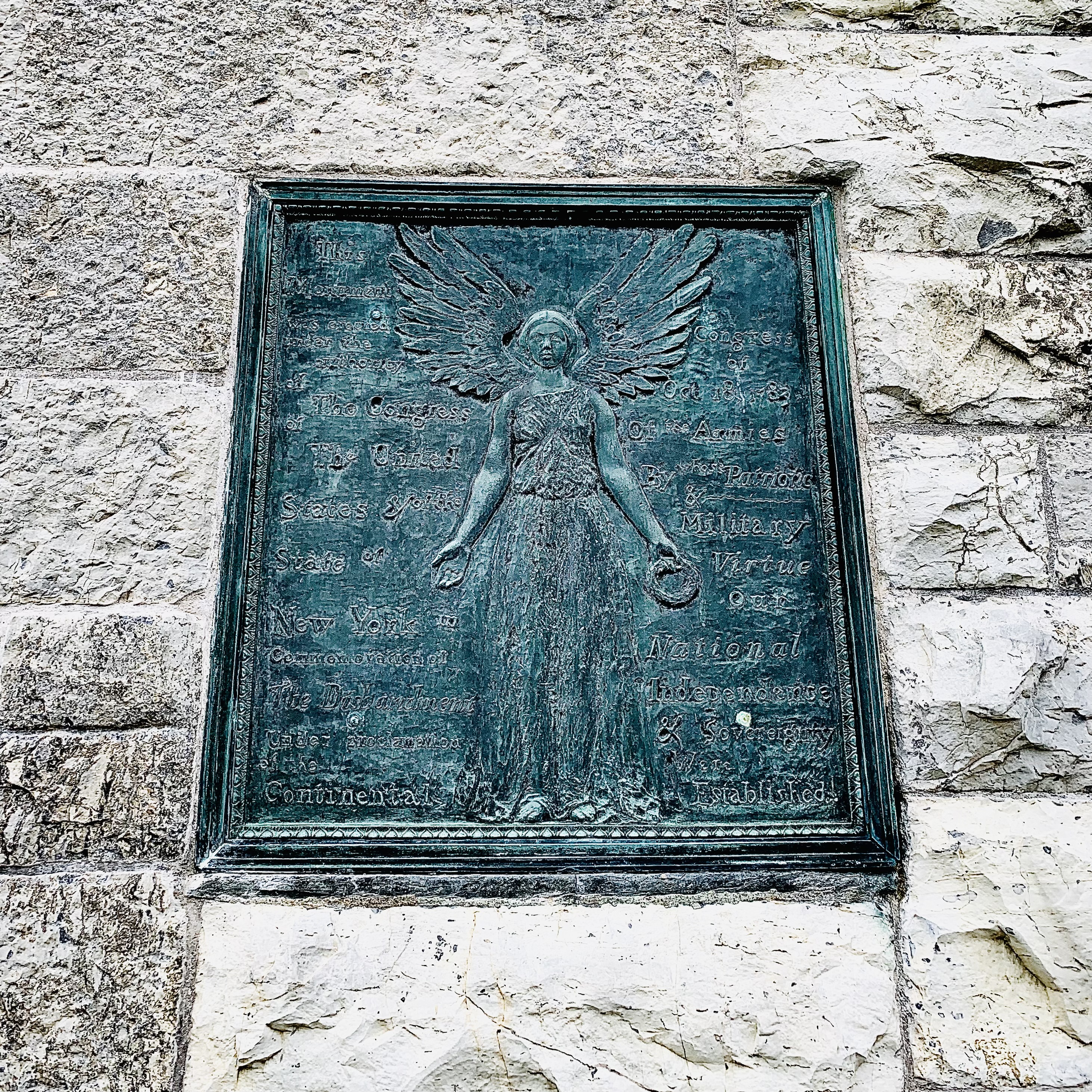
Dedication plaque of the Tower of Victory

=== Other monuments and memorials ===
Also on the property are three other monuments or memorials, each dedicated to a unique and noteworthy subchapter of revolutionary or local history.

The oldest on the site is the grave of Uzal Knapp, one of the longest-lived veterans of the Continental Army. During the later years of his life he claimed to be the last living member of Washington's Commander-in-Chief's Guard (incorrectly referred to at "Life Guards") and so he was buried on the site with military honors in 1856. Four years later, a monument was erected over his gravesite. More recently historians have come to doubt the historicity of his claim, though, as he is never mentioned in the rolls of the Commander-in-Chief's Guards.

There is a statue entitled The Minuteman, by Henry Hudson Kitson, that was erected on the northwest section of the grounds on November 11, 1924. It is extremely similar to another statue by Kitson at the site of the Battles of Lexington and Concord. Since hostilities began on April 19, 1775, at the Battle of Lexington and ended at Newburgh on April 19, 1783, with the release of General Washington's Proclamation for the Cessation of Hostilities, Kitson intended for the statues to serve as the metaphorical bookends of the war.

In 1927, the Judson P. Galloway Post Number 152 of the American Legion exchanged sod from the grave of their namesake, First Lieutenant Judson Paul Galloway, with sod from Washington's Headquarters and erected a small plaque outside the house. Galloway was a local Newburgh man who was killed in action at the Battle of Belleau Wood near Chateau-Thierry, France on June 6, 1918, and buried nearby. A member of the United States Army's 23rd Infantry Regiment, 2nd Infantry Division of the American Expeditionary Force, Galloway was posthumously awarded the Distinguished Service Cross for "extraordinary heroism in action" on July 9, 1918: after he was gravely wounded in battle he continued to direct the advance of his platoon in the face of heavy machine gun fire, before he was shot a second time and succumbed to his wounds.

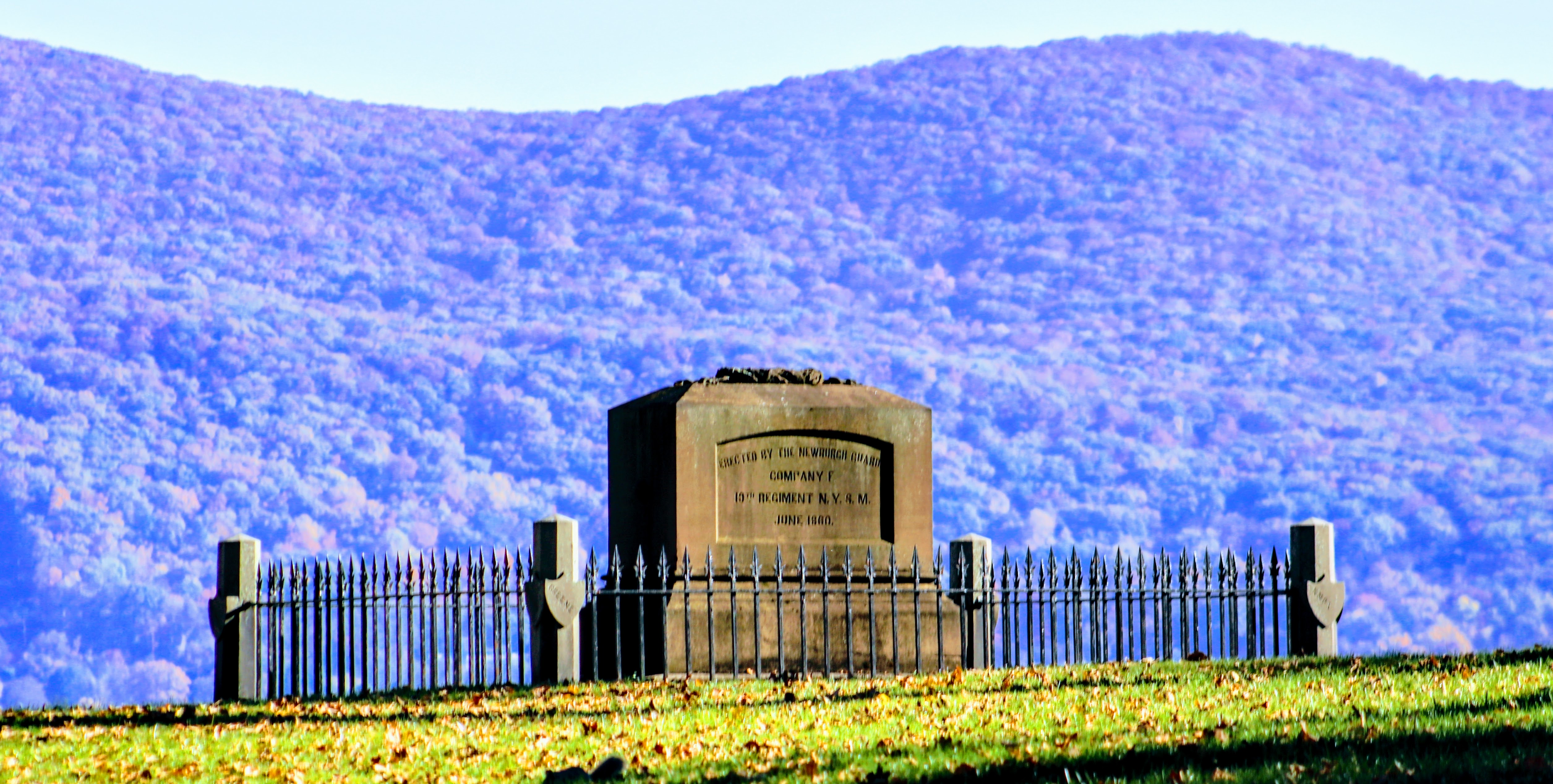
Grave of Uzal Knapp

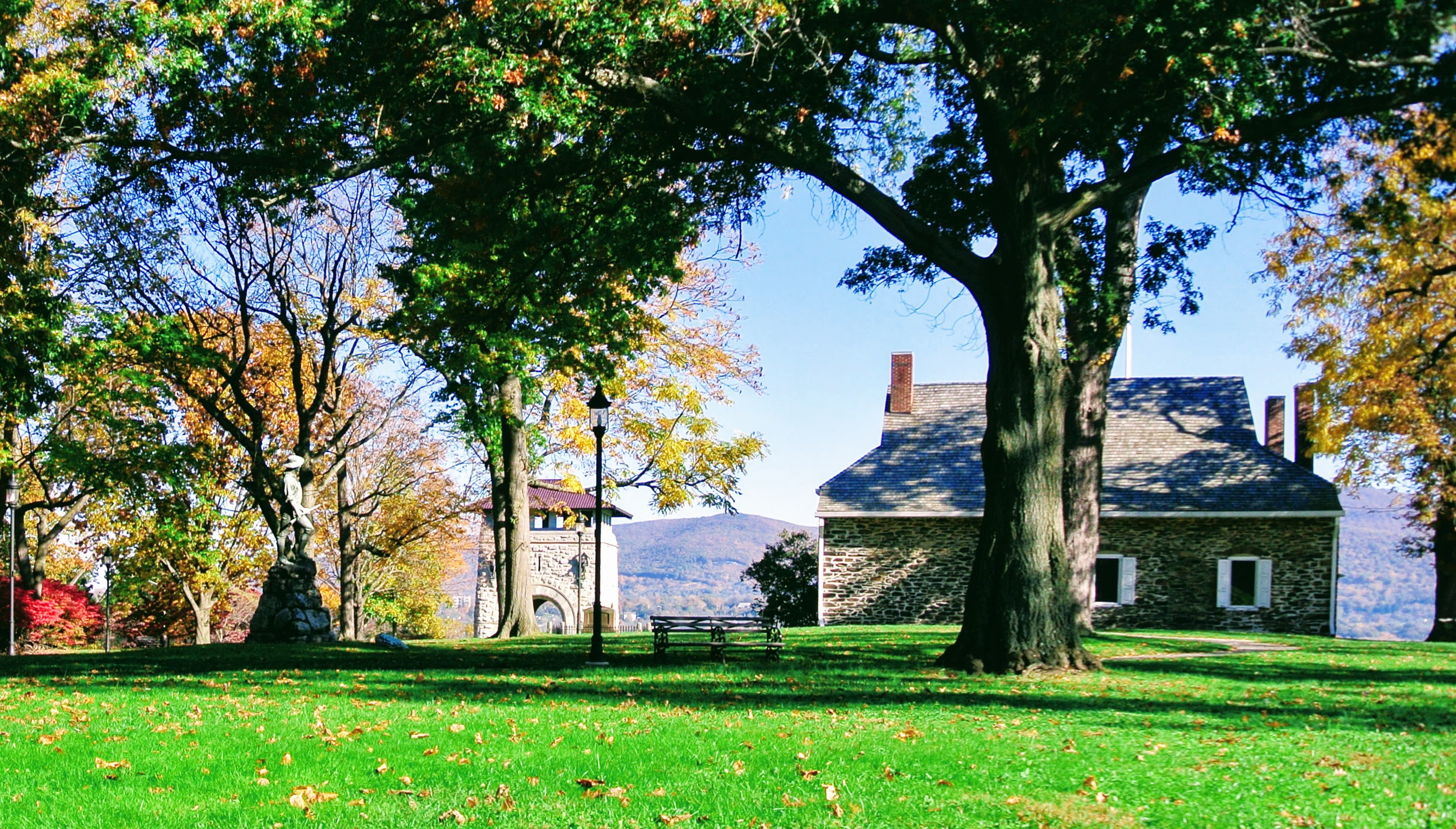
The Minuteman by Kitson, visible to the left, installed in 1924

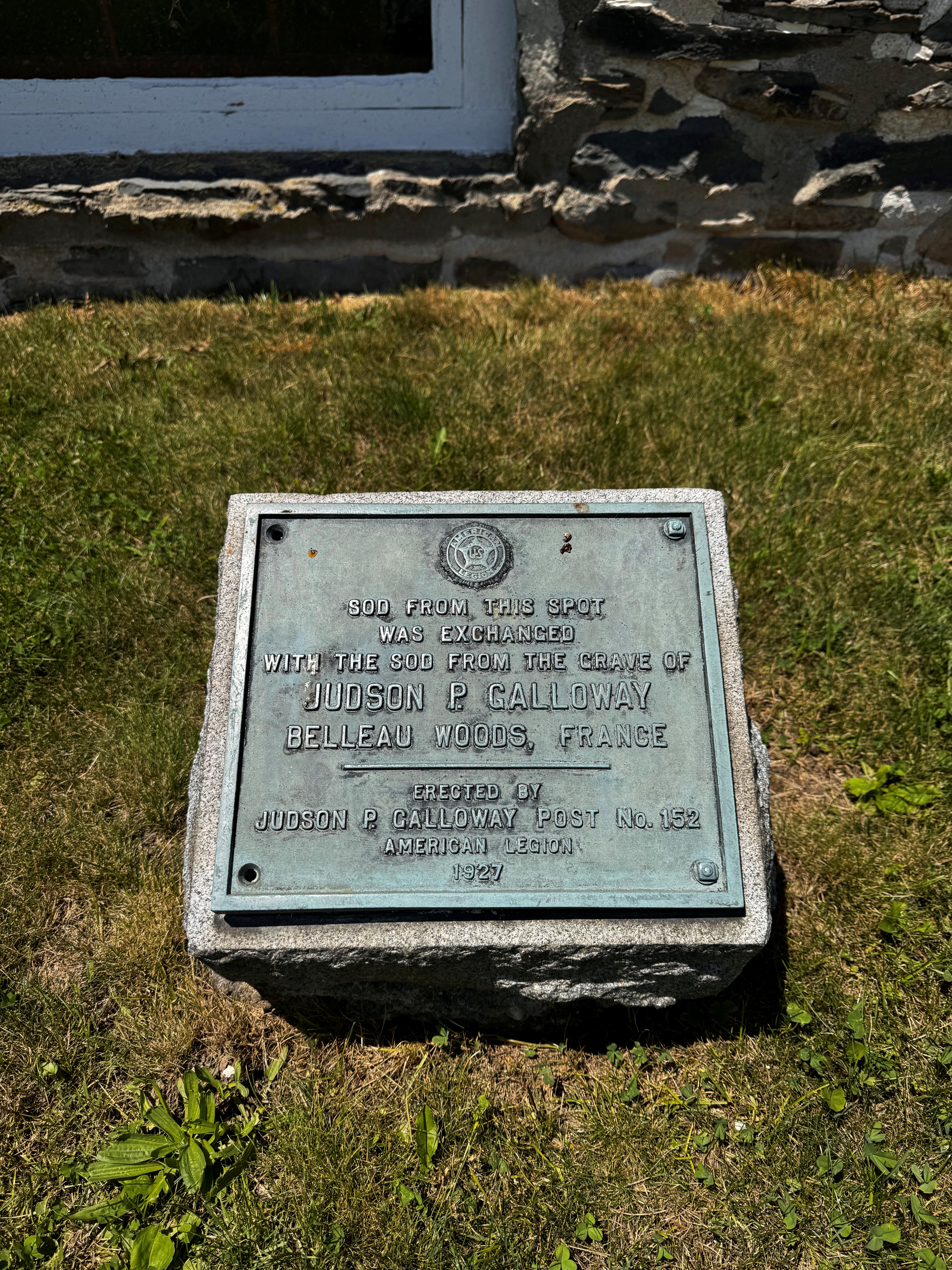
Commemorative plaque of First Lieutenant Judson P. Galloway

== Site information ==
The site is currently open to visitors year-round. In summer months from mid-April to mid-October the site is open Wednesday through Saturday from 11 am to 5 pm and Sunday from 1 pm to 5 pm. In winter months from mid-October to mid-April the site is only open Fridays and Saturdays from 11 am to 3 pm, or by appointment Tuesday through Thursday.

Visitors must purchase tickets at the museum to view the galleries, the Headquarters house, and the Tower of Victory observation deck. Museum galleries are self-guided, whereas access to the Headquarters and Tower of Victory observation deck are restricted solely to interpreter-guided tours.

== Honors and commemoration ==
On April 19, 1933, the 150th anniversary of Washington's Proclamation for the Cessation of Hostilities, the U.S. Post Office issued a commemorative stamp featuring an accurate depiction of Washington's Headquarters at Hasbrouck House overlooking the Hudson River.

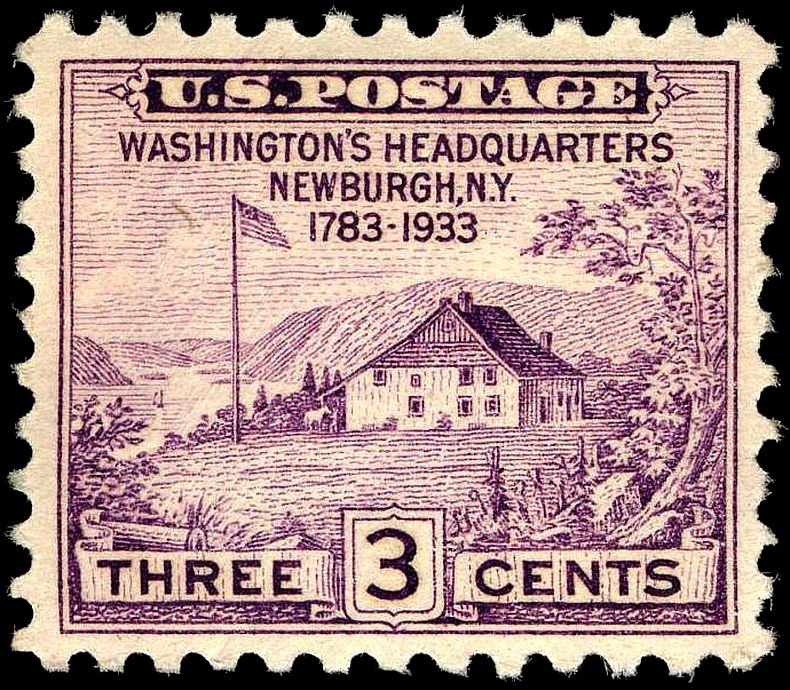
1933 commemorative stamp of Washington's HQ

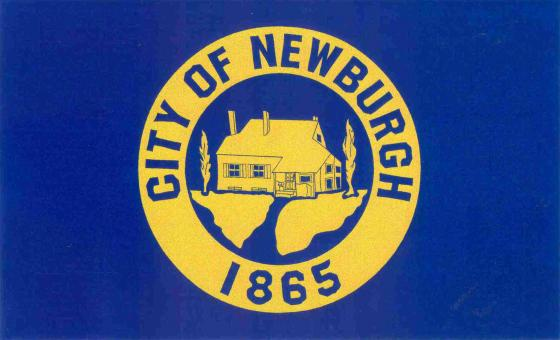
Washington's Headquarters featured on the flag of the city of Newburgh

== See also ==
- List of Washington's Headquarters during the Revolutionary War
- List of National Historic Landmarks in New York
- National Register of Historic Places listings in Orange County, New York
- Knox's Headquarters State Historic Site, headquarters of General Henry Knox, also a National Historic Landmark in New Windsor
- New Windsor Cantonment State Historic Site, final encampment of Continental Army in nearby New Windsor

== Bibliography ==
- Baldwin, John. History and guide to Newburgh and Washington's headquarters, and a catalogue of manuscripts and relics in Washington's headquarters. New York: N. Tibballs & sons., E-book
- Fitzpatrick, John (1931). The Writings of George Washington from the Original Manuscript Sources. Washington, D.C.: U.S. Government Printing Office.
- Fleming, Thomas (2007). The Perils of Peace: America's Struggle for Survival After Yorktown. New York: Smithsonian Books. ISBN 9780061139109.
- Godfrey, Carlos Emmor (1904). The Commander-in-chief's Guard, Revolutionary War. Stevenson-Smith Company., E'book
- Grizzard, Frank E. (2002). George Washington: A Biographical Companion. ABC-CLIO., Book
- Head, David (2019). A Crisis of Peace: George Washington, the Newburgh Conspiracy, and the Fate of the American Revolution. New York: Pegasus Books. ISBN 978-1643130811.
- Kohn, Richard H (1970). "The Inside History of the Newburgh Conspiracy: America and the Coup d'Etat". The William and Mary Quarterly. 27 (Third Series, Volume 27, No. 2): 188–220. doi:10.2307/1918650. JSTOR 1918650.
- Mayo, Katherine (1938). General Washington's Dilemma. New York: Harcourt, Brace and Company. hdl:2027/uc1.$b61195.
- McGurty, Michael S. (2023). George Washington Versus the Continental Army: Showdown at the New Windsor Cantonment, 1782-1783. Jefferson, NC: McFarland. ISBN 978-1476692371.
- Rappleye, Charles (2010). Robert Morris: Financier of the American Revolution. New York: Simon and Schuster. ISBN 9781416570912.
- Schenkman, A. J. (2008). Washington's Headquarters in Newburgh. Arcadia Publishing., Book
- Vanderpoel, Ambrose (1921). History of Chatham New Jersey. Charles Francis Press – via archive.org.
