= Badge of Military Merit =

American Continental Army award

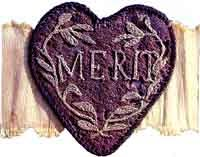
- Type: Badge
- Awarded for: Military merit
- Description: Figure of a heart in purple cloth, or silk, edged with narrow lace or binding.
- Country: United States
- Presented by: General George Washington
- Eligibility: Non-commissioned officers and soldiers of the Continental Army
- Status: Obsolete
- Established: August 7, 1782
- First award: May 3, 1783
- Final award: June 10, 1783

The Badge of Military Merit was an award for non-commissioned officers and soldiers of the Continental Army. It is considered America's first military decoration, and the second oldest in the world (after the Order of St. George). (Note: Although the Fidelity Medallion is older, it was awarded for a specific event, so the Badge of Military Merit is generally considered the oldest United States military award.) Non commissioned officers and soldiers of the Continental Army were eligible. Renamed as the Purple Heart, it was ordered redesigned in 1931, and was re-commissioned in 1932 by General Douglas MacArthur in honor of George Washington’s bicentennial.

== History ==
The Badge of Military Merit was first announced in General George Washington's general orders to the Continental Army issued on August 7, 1782, at the Headquarters in Newburgh. Designed by Washington in the form of a purple heart, it was intended as a military order for soldiers who exhibited, "not only instances of unusual gallantry in battle, but also extraordinary fidelity and essential service in any way".

=== First awards ===
The writings of General Washington indicate that three badges, two Honorary Badges of Distinction and a Badge of Military Merit, were created on August 7, 1782. This is thought to be the first time in modern history that military awards had been presented to common soldiers. Though the French Royal Army had started awarding the Medallion of Two Swords to enlisted soldiers for longevity in 1771, the general practice in Europe was to honor high-ranking officers who had achieved victory, rather than honoring common soldiers. But in America, as General Washington said, the "road to glory in a patriot army and a free country is…open to all".

On August 7, 1782, Washington issued a general order detailing the badge:

The General ever desirous to cherish virtuous ambition in his soldiers, as well as to foster and encourage every species of Military merit, directs that whenever any singularly meritorious action is performed, the author of it shall be permitted to wear on his facings over the left breast, the figure of a heart in purple cloth, or silk, edged with narrow lace or binding. Not only instances of unusual gallantry, but also of extraordinary fidelity and essential service in any way shall meet with a due reward. Before this favour can be conferred on any man, the particular fact, or facts, on which it is to be grounded must be set forth to the Commander in chief accompanied with certificates from the Commanding officers of the regiment and brigade to which the Candadate [sic] for reward belonged, or other incontestable proofs, and upon granting it, the name and regiment of the person with the action so certified are to be enrolled in the book of merit which will be kept at the orderly office. Men who have merited this last distinction to be suffered to pass all guards and sentinals [sic] which officers are permitted to do. The road to glory in a patriot army and a free country is thus open to all. This order is also to have retrospect to the earliest stages of the war, and to be considered as a permanent one.

== Recipients ==
Most historians indicate that only three people received the Badge of Military Merit during the American Revolutionary War, all of them noncommissioned officers, and the only ones who received the award from General Washington himself. Those soldiers were:

On May 3, 1783

- Sergeant William Brown of the 5th Connecticut Regiment of the Connecticut Line
- Sergeant Elijah Churchill of the 2nd Regiment Light Dragoons

On June 10, 1783

- Sergeant Daniel Bissell of the 2nd Connecticut Regiment of the Connecticut Line

Period records, however, indicate that several others may have been awarded the Badge of Military Merit for service in the American Revolutionary War.

== Status of original badges ==
Brown's badge was found in a Deerfield, New Hampshire barn in the 1920s. There is disagreement in published sources about what became of Brown's badge after that. A badge on display at the American Independence Museum in Exeter, New Hampshire on behalf of the Society of the Cincinnati, New Hampshire Branch is stated to be Brown's. Other sources say that Brown's badge was reported lost in 1924 while in the possession of Bishop Paul Matthews, and that the badge on display in Exeter belongs to a fourth, unknown recipient.

As of 2015, Churchill's badge was owned by the National Temple Hill Association and on display at the New Windsor Cantonment State Historic Site. Churchill's badge was rediscovered when H. E. Johnson, a Michigan farmer and one of Churchill's descendants, wrote to the National Temple Hill Association about the badge.

Bissell's badge was reportedly lost when his house burned in July 1813.

== Disuse ==
After the Revolutionary War, the Badge of Military Merit fell into disuse although it was never officially abolished. In 1932, the United States War Department authorized the new Purple Heart Medal for soldiers who had previously received either a Wound Chevron or the Army Wound Ribbon. At that time, it was also determined that the Purple Heart Medal would be considered the official "successor decoration" to the Badge of Military Merit.
