= William Brown (soldier) =

American soldier

- Born: February 12, 1761; Stamford, Connecticut
- Died: October 22, 1804 (aged 43); Columbia, Ohio
- Burial place: Fulton-Presbyterian Cemetery; 39.10750°N 84.43330°W
- Military career
- Allegiance: United States
- Branch: Continental Army
- Service years: 1775–
- Rank: Sergeant
- Units: 5th Connecticut Regiment; 8th Connecticut Regiment; 2nd Connecticut Regiment
- Conflicts: American Revolutionary War; Battle of Stony Point
- Awards: Badge of Military Merit

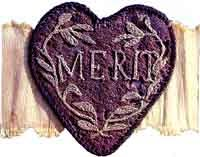
Badge of Military Merit

William Brown (1759–1808) was a soldier for the Continental Army during the American Revolutionary War. He was born in Stamford and enlisted in the 5th Connecticut Regiment as a corporal on 23 May 1775, and re-enlisted as a private on 9 April 1777, for the duration of the war in the 8th Connecticut Regiment. He was promoted to corporal on 8 May 1779, and to sergeant on 1 August 1780, transferring with the consolidation of units to the 5th Connecticut Regiment on 1 January 1781, and to the 2nd Connecticut Regiment on 1 January 1783. He was awarded the Badge of Military Merit, one of only three people to be awarded the medal that later became the Purple Heart. No record of his citation has been uncovered, but it is believed that he participated in the assault on Redoubt No. 10 during the siege of Yorktown.

After the war he moved west to a newly developed river town called Cincinnati, Ohio. When President George Washington sent General Anthony Wayne out to Cincinnati in the spring of 1793 to take charge of subduing the Indians, one of Wayne's first acts was to call upon William Brown to furnish him with a "company of spies". It is possible that Brown joined the General at the Battle of Fallen Timbers. He lived out his days in Cincinnati, his original tombstone was lost to time; possibly stolen or destroyed. On 24 July 2004, at a cemetery across the street from what is known as Cincinnati Municipal Lunken Airport, a new tombstone was laid out in remembrance to Sgt. William Brown.
