= Daniel Bissell (spy) =

American soldier and spy

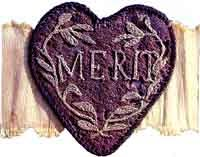
- Sergeant Daniel Bissell was awarded the Badge of Military Merit by General George Washington in June 1783
- Born: December 30, 1754; Windsor, Hartford County, Connecticut Colony
- Died: August 21, 1824 (aged 69); Richmond, New York
- Burial place: Allens Hill Cemetery
- Parent(s): Daniel and Elizabeth Bissell
- Awards: Badge of Military Merit
- Espionage activity
- Allegiance: United States of America
- Service branch: Continental Army; United States Army
- Agency: 16th Infantry Regiment
- Service years: 1776-1783, 1799-1800
- Rank: First Lieutenant
- Operations: Undercover in the British Army

Daniel Bissell (December 30, 1754 – August 21, 1824) was a soldier and spy for the Continental Army during the American Revolutionary War. Bissell joined the British Army for 13 months and passed intelligence information to the Continental Army. For his efforts, Bissell was awarded the Badge of Military Merit by General George Washington.

== Early life ==
He was the son of Daniel and Elizabeth Bissell and was born in Windsor, Hartford County, Connecticut Colony (now East Windsor) in 1754.

== Role in the American Revolution ==
On April 1, 1776, signed on for the duration as a corporal in the 5th Connecticut Regiment. He became a sergeant on September 1, 1777, and ended the war with the 2nd Connecticut Regiment.

Under the direct orders of General George Washington, Bissell posed as a deserter in the city of New York from August 14, 1781, to September 29, 1782. He realized that to get the information Washington needed, he would have to join the British Army: for 13 months, he served in the British Infantry Corps led by Benedict Arnold. Bissell memorized everything he was able to find out and then made his way back to friendly lines where he was placed under arrest until Washington corroborated his story. Sergeant Bissell was able to furnish valuable information including detailed maps he drew of the enemy's positions. He was to become the last recipient of the Badge of Military Merit in June 1783. Washington is given credit for designing the Purple Heart, but the design originated from an incident of Bissell's. While at a ball with his future wife and Washington, as Bissell was dancing with his wife, he stepped on her purple dress and ripped a piece off. He took the piece of fabric and folded into a heart and told his wife to hold onto it. When Washington learned of this, it inspired the idea to make the Purple Heart. This was published in a book that follows multiple families that are documented past the 1400s, one of which includes the Bissells. The award was lost in a house fire in 1813.

== After the Revolutionary War ==
During the Quasi War with France, Bissell served in the US Army. He was commissioned a First Lieutenant in the 16th Infantry Regiment on March 3, 1799, and was discharged on June 15, 1800.

Bissell died in 1824 in Richmond, New York, where he is buried in Allens Hill Cemetery. His tombstone is inscribed, "In memory of Daniel Bissell, Who died August 21st, 1824, Aged 70 Years, He had the confidence of Washington and served under him."

He likely was a relation of the Revolutionary War vet and War of 1812 general, Daniel Bissell.
