= Nathaniel Chipman =

American judge (1752–1843)

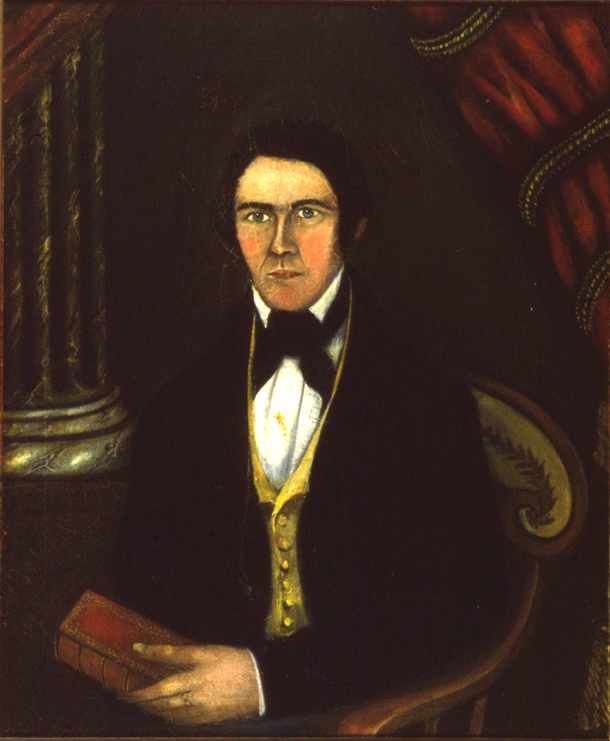
- Chipman, c. 1800

United States Senator from Vermont
- In office October 17, 1797 – March 3, 1803
- Preceded by: Isaac Tichenor
- Succeeded by: Israel Smith

Judge of the United States District Court for the District of Vermont
- In office March 4, 1791 – January 1, 1793
- Appointed by: George Washington
- Preceded by: Seat established by 1 Stat. 197
- Succeeded by: Samuel Hitchcock

Chief Judge of the Vermont Supreme Court
- In office 1813–1815
- Preceded by: Royall Tyler
- Succeeded by: Asa Aldis
- In office 1796–1797
- Preceded by: Isaac Tichenor
- Succeeded by: Israel Smith
- In office 1789–1791
- Preceded by: Moses Robinson
- Succeeded by: Samuel Knight

Judge of the Vermont Supreme Court
- In office 1786–1787
- Preceded by: John Fassett Jr.
- Succeeded by: None (Note: Court reduced from 5 seats to 3)

Personal details
- Born: November 15, 1752 Salisbury, Connecticut Colony, British America
- Died: February 13, 1843 (aged 90) Tinmouth, Vermont, U.S.
- Resting place: Tinmouth Cemetery
- Party: Federalist
- Spouse: Sarah Hill (m. 1781)
- Children: 6 (including Henry)
- Relatives: Daniel Chipman (brother); Lemuel Chipman (brother); John Logan Chipman (grandson); John W. Brownson (grandson)
- Education: Yale University
- Profession: Attorney

Military service
- Service: Continental Army
- Years of service: 1777–1778
- Rank: First Lieutenant
- Unit: 2nd Connecticut Regiment
- Wars: American Revolutionary War; Battle of White Marsh

Nathaniel Chipman (November 15, 1752 – February 13, 1843) was an American politician who served as a United States Senator from Vermont and Chief Justice of the Vermont Supreme Court. A Yale College graduate and Continental Army veteran of the American Revolution, Chipman became a prominent attorney and advocate for Vermont statehood. When Vermont was admitted to the Union, he served as the first judge of the United States District Court for the District of Vermont.

After Vermont became the fourteenth state, Chipman became a leader of its Federalist Party. In addition to his legal and political work, Chipman authored several works on government and law, served for 28 years as Professor of Law at Middlebury College, and was a satirical poet.

== Early life and education ==
Chipman was born in Salisbury, Connecticut Colony, British America on November 15, 1752, a son of Samuel Chipman and Hannah (Austin) Chipman. Chipman was privately tutored, then began attendance at Yale University, from which he graduated in 1777.

In January 1777, Chipman left Yale to volunteer for the Continental Army during the American Revolutionary War, and he received his diploma while he was serving. He was commissioned as an ensign in the 2nd Connecticut Regiment, and joined the army in Pennsylvania. He took part in the December 1777 Battle of White Marsh, and went into winter quarters with his unit at Valley Forge, where they remained until June 1778. Chipman was promoted to first lieutenant on December 29, 1777. He served through the summer of 1778, and resigned his commission at White Plains, New York on October 16, 1778.

== Career ==
Chipman left the army to move to the Vermont Republic, where he attained admission to the bar and entered private practice in Tinmouth. Chipman also continued his military service as a member of Captain John Spafford's Company, a unit of the militia regiment commanded by Colonel Gideon Warren. He was state's attorney in Montpelier from 1781 to 1785, and a member of the Vermont House of Representatives from 1784 to 1785. He was a judge of the Supreme Court of Vermont from 1786 to 1787, and served as chief judge from 1789 to 1791.

=== Vermont's admission to the Union ===
On February 9, 1791, Chipman met with President George Washington to notify him officially of Vermont's decision to apply for admission to the Union as the 14th state. New York had long objected to the existence of the government of Vermont on the grounds that Vermont was part of New York, a position that dated back to a pre-Revolutionary War dispute between the colonial governors of New York and New Hampshire over the right to sell Vermont land grants.

In 1790, New York agreed to give up its claim provided that an agreement on the boundary between Vermont and New York could be concluded. In consideration of New York giving up its claim to Vermont, Vermont paid $30,000 as an indemnity to owners of Vermont land who had received their grants from New York (about $800,000 in 2015). On February 18, 1791, Congress decided to admit Vermont to the Union, effective March 4, 1791.

=== Federal judicial service ===
Following the admission of the State of Vermont to the Union, President George Washington nominated Chipman as the first judge of the United States District Court for the District of Vermont, a new seat authorized by 1 Stat. 197. He was confirmed by the United States Senate on March 4, 1791, and received his commission the same day. He resigned on January 1, 1793.

=== State service ===
Following his resignation from the federal bench, Chipman resumed private practice in Tinmouth from 1793 to 1796. In 1833, he authored the book Sketches of the Principles of Government. Chipman served as chief justice of the Supreme Court of Vermont from 1796 to 1797.

=== Congressional service ===
Chipman was elected as a Federalist from Vermont to the United States Senate to fill the vacancy caused by the resignation of United States Senator Isaac Tichenor and served from October 17, 1797, until March 3, 1803. He was an unsuccessful candidate for reelection.

== Later career ==
Following his departure from Congress, Chipman resumed practicing law in Tinmouth. He was a member of the Vermont House of Representatives from 1806 to 1809 and in 1811. He was a member of the Vermont Council of Censors in 1813. He was chief justice of the Supreme Court of Vermont from 1813 to 1815. He was a professor of law at Middlebury College starting in 1816.

== Personal life and death ==
Chipman was the brother of Daniel Chipman, a United States representative from Vermont, and the grandfather of John Logan Chipman, a United States Representative from Michigan. In 1781, Chipman married Sarah Hill (1762–1831), they had six children, including Henry C. Chipman. Another son, Jeffrey Chipman, was a Justice of the Peace in Canandaigua, New York in the 1820s, and was the jurist from whom those attempting to prevent William Morgan from publishing a book opposing Freemasonry obtained an arrest warrant for Morgan, which eventually led to Morgan's disappearance and presumed death and the founding of the Anti-Masonic Party.

Chipman was the grandfather of John W. Brownson, a member of the New York State Senate. Brownson was the son of Dr. John Brownson and Nathaniel Chipman's daughter Laura.

Chipman died on February 17, 1843, in Tinmouth. He was interred in Tinmouth Cemetery.

== Sources ==
- The Life of Nathaniel Chipman, by Daniel Chipman, Kessinger Publishing, LLC (November 26, 2008)

=== Primary sources ===
- Hansen, Allen Oscar. Liberalism and American education in the eighteenth century (1926; reprinted 1965, 1977) for his plan to reform education.

Legal offices
Preceded by Seat established by 1 Stat. 197	Judge of the United States District Court for the District of Vermont; 1791–1793	Succeeded by Samuel Hitchcock
U.S. Senate
Preceded by Isaac Tichenor	U.S. senator (Class 1) from Vermont; 1797–1803	Succeeded by Israel Smith
Honorary titles
Preceded by Samuel Smith	Oldest living United States senator 1839–1843	Succeeded by Asher Robbins
