= Levi T. Griffin =

Union Army officer and politician

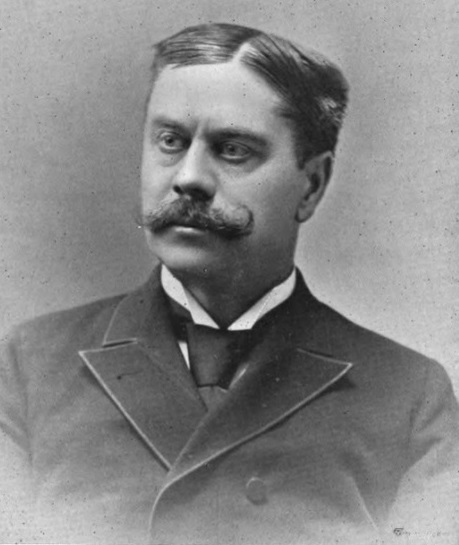
- From 1894's To Wit: Department of Law, University of Michigan

Member of the U.S. House of Representatives from Michigan's 1st district
- In office December 4, 1893 – March 3, 1895
- Preceded by: John L. Chipman
- Succeeded by: John B. Corliss

Personal details
- Born: May 23, 1837 Clinton, New York, U.S.
- Died: March 17, 1906 (aged 68) Detroit, Michigan, U.S.
- Party: Democratic
- Spouse: Mary Cabot Wickware (after 1867)
- Children: 3
- Education: University of Michigan Law School

Levi Thomas Griffin (May 23, 1837 – March 17, 1906) was a politician from the U.S. state of Michigan.

== Early life ==
Griffin, born in Clinton, New York, was named for his maternal grandfather, Levi Thomas of Utica, New York. He moved with his parents to Rochester, Michigan, in the fall of 1847. He graduated from the University of Michigan Law School at Ann Arbor in 1857. While studying for the bar in Detroit, he was employed as a court deputy in the Federal District Court through the assistance of a fellow University of Michigan alumnus, William A. Moore, who was then Assistant United States District Attorney. Griffin was admitted to the bar in May 1858 and, in November, moved to Grand Rapids, where he began to practice in the office of prominent Western Michigan lawyer Lucius Patterson. After a fire destroyed the offices in April 1860, along with most of the records of Kent County, Griffin returned to Detroit, where he was employed in the law offices of Moore until January 1862, when they formed a partnership named "Moore and Griffin".

== Military life ==
Griffin was commissioned by Governor Austin Blair, as Supernumerary Second Lieutenant in Company C of the Fourth Michigan Cavalry, and was mustered into service on August 13, 1862. He was promoted to full Second Lieutenant on December 18 and assigned to duty as Brigade Inspector. On February 1, 1863, he was promoted to First Lieutenant, and then on April 15 as regimental Adjutant. On February 24, 1864, he was commissioned as Captain, and on September 15 was assigned as Acting Assistant Adjutant General of the Second Cavalry Division. On December 25, he became Acting Assistant Adjutant General of the Cavalry Corps of the Military Division of the Mississippi, with Major General James H. Wilson commanding. He was mustered out of service on July 1, 1865, and was subsequently brevetted major of United States Volunteers by President Andrew Johnson on March 13, 1866, for gallant and meritorious service during the American Civil War.

== Post-war ==
After the war, Griffin returned to practice law in Detroit in his partnership with William A. Moore. On September 1, 1875, he formed a new partnership with Donald M. Dickinson under the name "Griffin and Dickinson". In 1883, he formed a new partnership, "Griffin & Warner", with Carlos E. Warner, who had become a partner with Moore after Griffin left. In 1888, the firm became "Griffin, Warner, Hunt & Berry". In 1890, when Berry retired and Hunt was elected assistant prosecuting attorney for Detroit, the firm's name returned to "Griffin & Warner". The firm was dissolved January 1, 1896.

Griffin was the Fletcher professor of law in the University of Michigan Law School 1886–1897. He was an unsuccessful candidate for the Michigan Supreme Court in 1887.

In November 1893, Griffin was elected a Democrat from Michigan's 1st congressional district to the 53rd Congress to fill the vacancy caused by the death of John Logan Chipman, serving from December 4, 1893, to March 3, 1895. He was an unsuccessful candidate for re-election in 1894, losing to Republican John Blaisdell Corliss.

Levi Griffin resumed the practice of his profession and became pension agent in 1896 and 1897. He died in Detroit and was interred in Woodmere Cemetery.

== Religion ==
In 1873, he converted from Presbyterian to Episcopalian, being confirmed in St. John's Episcopal Church. He was married October 8, 1867, to Mary Cabot Wickware of Detroit. They raised three children: William, Laura Moore, and Mary McClaren Griffin.

== Bibliography ==
- Griffin, Levi T. Cases on Personal Property. St. Paul, Minn.: West, 1895. (Printed at the request of Levi T. Griffin, A. M. Fletcher Professor of Law in the University of Michigan, for use in connection with his lectures in that school)

U.S. House of Representatives
Preceded by John L. Chipman	United States Representative for the 1st congressional district of Michigan; 1893–1895	Succeeded by John B. Corliss
