= Samuel Knight (judge) =

American judge (1731–1804)

Chief Justice of the Vermont Supreme Court
- In office 1791–1793
- Preceded by: Nathaniel Chipman
- Succeeded by: Isaac Tichenor

Associate Justice of the Vermont Supreme Court
- In office 1789–1791
- Preceded by: Stephen R. Bradley
- Succeeded by: Isaac Tichenor

Personal details
- Born: February 10, 1731 Woburn, Massachusetts
- Died: July 23, 1804 (aged 73) Brattleboro, Vermont
- Spouse: Mary Covill (or Covell) (m. 1756)
- Children: 6
- Profession: Attorney; Farmer

Military service
- Allegiance: Great Britain; Vermont Republic
- Branch/service: Connecticut Provincial Troops; Vermont Militia
- Years of service: 1759 (Connecticut); 1777 (Vermont)
- Rank: Private
- Unit: David Holmes's Company (Connecticut); Josiah Boyden's Company (Vermont)
- Battles/wars: French and Indian War (Great Britain/Connecticut); American Revolution (Vermont)

Samuel Knight (February 10, 1731 – July 23, 1804) was a legal and political figure in Vermont during its period as an independent republic and the early years of its statehood. Among the offices in which he served were Associate Justice of the Vermont Supreme Court (1789 to 1791), and Chief Justice (1791-1793).

== Early life ==
Knight was born in Woburn, Massachusetts on February 10, 1731 (Old Style), the son of John Knight and Abigail (Simonds) Hastings Knight. He was raised in Killingly, Connecticut and prepared for a legal career; although the exact circumstances of his education are not known, contemporary observers including Matthew Lyon stated that Knight's legal acumen and general knowledge were equal to or superior to those of most college graduates. Knight served in the Connecticut provincial troops during the French and Indian War; his name appears on the 1759 muster roll of the Windham County company commanded by David Holmes. His name also appears on the list of unit members who did not take part in the militia's expedition against the French Army at Lake George in June 1759, although the reason for his absence is not given.

== Move to Vermont ==
In 1762, Knight moved to Brattleboro, Vermont, where he farmed. During Vermont's early years, jurisdiction was claimed by New Hampshire's colonial government, and prospective settlers and speculators purchased land grants from its Governor, Benning Wentworth. The government of New York later claimed jurisdiction, and was upheld by the British government. When the New York government attempted to make those who had bought grants from New Hampshire purchase confirmatory titles, most Vermonters refused to pay for the same land a second time. Instead they formed a militia, the Green Mountain Boys, which resisted efforts by New York to compel payment or evict those who had purchased their land from New Hampshire's governor. The Green Mountain Boys also punished anyone attempting to settle in Vermont after purchasing a grant from New York, and punished those Vermonters who were willing to pay for a confirmatory title from New York. In addition, they resisted anyone residing in Vermont who accepted a government appointment from New York's governor, knowing that these appointments would enable New York to assert jurisdiction over Vermont.

=== Loyal to New York ===
Knight served as Brattleboro's town clerk from 1773 to 1774. He was admitted to the bar by New York's courts at about the same time, though the details of his legal studies are not known, and accepted an appointment from New York's governor as a commissioner for administering oaths. These pro-New York activities caused local people loyal to Vermont to look on Knight with disfavor, and after two individuals were killed in a dispute between New York officials and the Vermonters who opposed them (the 1775 Westminster massacre), Knight fled Vermont for fear of retribution. He resided in Boston and then New York City, and returned to Brattleboro the following year.

== American Revolution ==
Knight opposed the British during the American Revolution, and eventually concluded that New York would never be able to assert jurisdiction in Vermont, so he became active in the movement that opposed New York. In addition to service in the Vermont Militia as a private in the company commanded by Captain Josiah Boyden (part of the regiment commanded by Colonel William Williams), Knight accepted appointment from Vermont as a justice of the peace. Though he was briefly suspended while his previous ties to New York were investigated, he was reinstated several months later and his loyalty was never again questioned. He subsequently served as Brattleboro's representative to the Vermont House in 1781 and 1783. He served as state's attorney for Windham County in 1783, and also as a member of Brattleboro's board of selectmen from 1783 to 1784. Knight also served again as Brattleboro's town clerk from 1783 to 1787.

== Post-American Revolution ==
Knight served in the Vermont House again in 1785. He was judge of the Windham County Court from 1786 to 1787. He was state's attorney again from 1788 to 1789, and served in the Vermont House again in 1787 and 1797.

From 1789 to 1791, Knight was an associate justice of the Vermont Supreme Court; he served as chief justice from 1791 to 1793. He was considered for appointment as Judge of the U.S. District Court when Vermont was admitted to statehood in 1791, and again when the position became vacant in 1793, but was not nominated. In 1792 and 1799, Knight served on the state Council of Censors, the body empowered to meet every seven years and review actions of the state House of Representatives and the governor and executive council to ensure their constitutionality. In 1793, Knight was also a delegate to Vermont's constitutional convention.

Knight served on the Windham County Court after his Supreme Court service; he was presiding judge from 1794 to 1796, and again from 1801 to 1802.

== Death and burial ==
Knight died in Brattleboro on July 23, 1804. He is presumed to have been buried at the site which is now known as Meeting House Hill Cemetery in Brattleboro, but the exact location of his grave is not known.

== Family ==
In 1757, Knight married Mary Covill (or Covell) (b. 1734) of Killingly, Connecticut. Their children included:

- Abigail (b. 1758)
- Mary (b. 1760)
- John (b. 1762)
- Rhoda (b. 1763)
- Horatio (b.1775)
- Timothy (1781-1856)

== Sources ==
=== Magazines ===
- Clough, Ovando D. (January 1, 1908). ""The War of the Grants", Or Along the Political Highway of Vermont". The Vermonter. White River Junction, VT: Chas. R. Cummings.
- Taft, Russell S. (January 1, 1894). "The Supreme Court of Vermont, Part II". The Green Bag. Boston, MA: Boston Book Company.

=== Books ===
- Cabot, Mary Rogers (1921). Annals of Brattleboro, 1681-1895. Vol. 1. Brattleboro, VT: E. L. Hildreth & Co.
- Cabot, Mary Rogers (1922). Annals of Brattleboro, 1681-1895. Vol. 2. Brattleboro, VT: E. L. Hildreth & Co.
- Connecticut Historical Society (1905). Rolls of Connecticut Men in the French and Indian War, 1755-1762. Vol. 2. Hartford, CT: Case, Lockwood, and Brainard Company.
- Goodhue, Mary A. (1935). Lineage Book. Vol. 147. Washington, DC: Daughters of the American Revolution.
- Hooper, Virginia S. (1970). We Travel with a Multitude: A History of the Hooper, Sharp, Adams, and Bonnifield Families and Twenty-Five Allied Families, ca. 1700 to 1970. Santa Clara, CA: V. S. Hooper.
- Vermont Historical Society (1967). Vermont History Journal. Montpelier, VT: VHS.

=== Newspapers ===
- French, O. L. (October 31, 1890). "Brattleboro in 1748-1790: The First Settlements Away From Fort Dummer". Vermont Phoenix. Brattleboro, VT.
- French, O. L. (April 14, 1905). "Judge Samuel Knight: Interesting Sketch of the Grandfather of the Late Thomas J. Knight". Vermont Phoenix. Brattleboro, VT.
