= J. Logan Chipman =

American politician (1830–1893)

John Logan Chipman
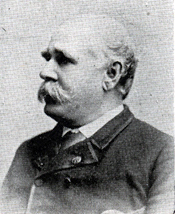

Member of the U.S. House of Representatives from Michigan's 1st district
- In office March 4, 1887 – August 17, 1893
- Preceded by: William C. Maybury
- Succeeded by: Levi T. Griffin

Member of the Michigan House of Representatives
- In office 1865–1866

Personal details
- Born: June 5, 1830 Detroit, Michigan Territory, U.S.
- Died: August 17, 1893 (aged 63) Detroit, Michigan, U.S.
- Resting place: Elmwood Cemetery
- Party: Democratic
- Spouse: Elizabeth Sha-wa-na
- Relations: Nathaniel Chipman
- Children: 2
- Education: University of Michigan
- Occupation: Lawyer; judge; politician

John Logan Chipman (June 5, 1830 – August 17, 1893) was a politician from the U.S. state of Michigan who was most notable for his service as a United States representative from 1887 until his death.

== Early life ==
Chipman was born in Detroit in the Michigan Territory, and attended the public schools of Detroit and the University of Michigan at Ann Arbor, 1843-1845. He engaged in the Lake Superior region as explorer for the Montreal Mining Co. in 1846 and was assistant clerk of the Michigan House of Representatives in 1853. He studied law and admitted to the bar in 1854, practicing in the Lake Superior region.

== Political career ==
Chipman returned to Detroit and was city attorney from 1857 to 1860. In 1865 and 1866, he was a member of the Michigan House of Representatives representing the First District of Wayne County. In 1866, he ran as the Democratic candidate for the United States House of Representatives from Michigan's 1st congressional district, losing in the general election to Republican incumbent Fernando C. Beaman.

Attorney of the police board of Detroit from 1867 to 1879, Chipman was elected judge of the superior court of Detroit on May 1, 1879. He was reelected in 1885 and served until he resigned in 1887.

Elected as a Democrat in 1886 to the Fiftieth Congress and re-elected to the three succeeding Congresses, Chipman served as United States Representative for the first district of the state of Michigan from March 4, 1887, until his death.

== Death ==
Chipman died of pneumonia in Detroit, Wayne County, Michigan, on August 17, 1893 (age 63 years, 73 days). He is interred at Elmwood Cemetery, Detroit, Michigan.

== Family life ==
Chipman was the grandson of Nathaniel Chipman, a U.S. Senator from Vermont. His parents were Henry C. Chipman and Martha Logan Chipman. Daniel Chipman was his grand-uncle.

Chipman married Elizabeth Sha-wa-na, a woman of American Indian descent, and they had two children, Henry and Charlotte.

== See also ==
- List of members of the United States Congress who died in office (1790–1899)

U.S. House of Representatives
Preceded by William C. Maybury	Member of the U.S. House of Representatives from Michigan's 1st congressional district March 4, 1887 – August 17, 1893	Succeeded by Levi T. Griffin
