= Alfred Lucking =

American politician (1856–1929)

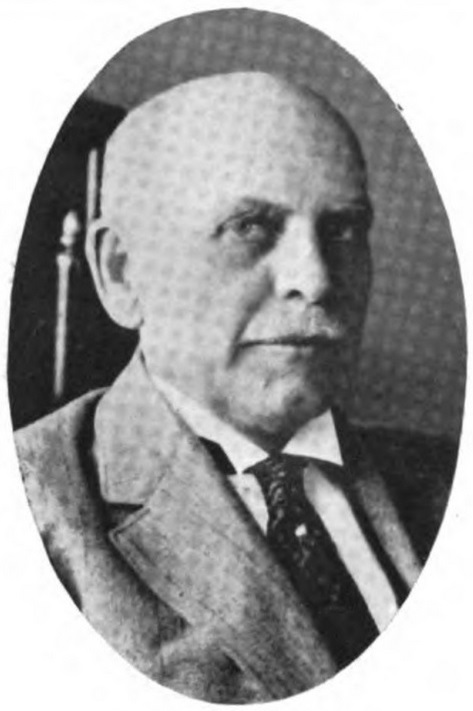
- From 1918's Bench and Bar of Michigan

Member of the U.S. House of Representatives from Michigan's 1st district
- In office March 4, 1903 – March 3, 1905
- Preceded by: John B. Corliss
- Succeeded by: Edwin Denby

Personal details
- Born: December 18, 1856 Ingersoll, Province of Canada
- Died: December 1, 1929 (aged 72) Detroit, Michigan
- Resting place: Woodlawn Cemetery, Detroit
- Citizenship: US
- Party: Democratic
- Spouse: Sarah Laviah Rose
- Children: William A. Lucking; Dean L. Lucking
- Education: Eastern Michigan University; University of Michigan Law School
- Profession: Lawyer; Politician

Alfred Lucking (December 18, 1856 – December 1, 1929) was an American lawyer and politician from the U.S. state of Michigan. He served as a member of the United States House of Representatives, and was general counsel for the Ford Motor Company and the Henry Ford interests.

== Early life ==
Lucking was born in Ingersoll in the Province of Canada and moved with his parents to Ypsilanti, Michigan, in 1858 where he attended public schools, Ypsilanti High School, and the Michigan State Normal College (now Eastern Michigan University). He graduated from the University of Michigan Law School in Ann Arbor in 1878, and was admitted to the bar the same year. He began the practice of law in Jackson, Michigan.

== Career ==
He moved to Detroit, Michigan, in 1880 and continued the practice of law. He was temporary chairman of the Democratic State Convention in 1900 and was both temporary and permanent chairman of the State conventions in 1902, 1908, and 1924. He was permanent chairman in 1928.

In 1902, Lucking defeated incumbent Republican John Blaisdell Corliss to be elected as a Democratic candidate from Michigan's 1st congressional district to the Fifty-eighth Congress, serving from March 4, 1903, until March 3, 1905.

Lucking was an unsuccessful candidate for re-election in 1904 to the Fifty-ninth Congress and resumed the practice of law in Detroit. He was an unsuccessful candidate for election to the United States Senate in 1912. He later became general counsel for the Ford Motor Company and the Henry Ford interests from 1914 to 1923, and was industrialist Henry Ford's personal attorney. He also served as president of the Detroit-Vancouver Timber Company. He was a delegate to the 1924 Democratic National Convention.

== Death ==
Lucking died in Detroit on December 1, 1929, just before his seventy-third birthday. He is interred at Woodlawn Cemetery in Detroit.

== Family life ==
Lucking was the son of Joseph Alfred Lucking and Margaret Ellen Ford. He married Sarah Laviah Rose on February 23, 1881. They had two sons, William A. Lucking and Dean L. Lucking.

U.S. House of Representatives
Preceded by John B. Corliss	Member of the U.S. House of Representatives from Michigan's 1st congressional district 1903–1905	Succeeded by Edwin Denby
