= John Blaisdell Corliss =

American politician

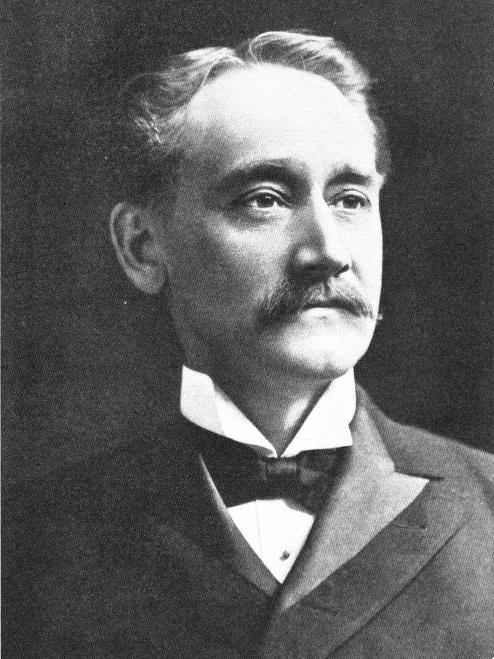
- Corliss c. 1922

Member of the U.S. House of Representatives from Michigan's 1st district
- In office March 4, 1895 – March 3, 1903
- Preceded by: Levi T. Griffin
- Succeeded by: Alfred Lucking

Detroit City Attorney
- In office 1882–1886

Personal details
- Born: June 7, 1851 Richford, Vermont
- Died: December 24, 1929 (aged 78) Detroit, Michigan
- Party: Republican
- Spouse(s): Elizabeth Danforth (m. 1877, d. 1886); Dorothy Montgomery (m. 1917)
- Education: Fairfax Preparatory School
- Alma mater: Vermont Methodist University; Columbian College

John Blaisdell Corliss (June 7, 1851 – December 24, 1929) was an American attorney, historian, and Republican politician from the city of Detroit, Michigan. He served as Detroit City Attorney for four years and represented the city in the U.S. House of Representatives from 1895 to 1903.

== Early life ==
Corliss was born in Richford, Vermont to Hezekiah and Lydia (Rounds) Corliss. He attended the common schools and the Fairfax Preparatory School and graduated from the Vermont Methodist University at Montpelier in 1871 and from the law department of Columbian College (now George Washington University Law School), Washington, D.C., in 1875. Corliss settled in Detroit in 1875 and was admitted to the bar the same year and commenced practice there.

On December 5, 1877, in Barnard, Vermont, he wedded Elizabeth N. Danforth, who died in 1886. They were the parents of two sons and two daughters: John B. Corliss Jr., Elizabeth D. Holley, the wife of Earl Holley; Margaryt M. Holley, the wife of George M. Holley; and Cullen Danforth Corliss.

== Politics ==
He was the city attorney of Detroit from 1882 to 1886 and prepared the first complete charter for Detroit, which was passed by the Michigan State Legislature in 1884. He was also president of the Michigan Lubricator Company and of the Shipman Koal Company of Pennsylvania. He was also a member of the Detroit Board of Commerce.

Corliss was made a Mason in Union Lodge of Detroit in 1880 and during the ensuing five years became a Chapter and Commandery Mason and attained the thirty-second degree of the Scottish Rite. From 1887 to 1892, he was commander-in-chief of the Michigan Sovereign Consistory, and he was one of the promoters of the consolidation of the Masonic order in the Valley of Detroit, resulting in the establishment of the Masonic Temple Association and the building of the Masonic Temple on Lafayette Avenue, having exclusive charge of the legislative and legal work. This association owns property to the value of more than a million dollars, title being held by the corporation created for the purpose and controlled by the board of trustees elected by the respective Masonic bodies. In 1890, the honorary thirty-third degree was conferred upon Corliss. For many years, he served on the board of trustees of the Temple Association, and he has been president of the Old Guard of Detroit Commandery. He was the prime organizer and first president of the Pioneer Association of Michigan Sovereign Consistory, and he was also the organizer and first president of the Past Potentates, Moslem Temple. Moslem Temple, the social branch of high degrees of Masonry, was made an active organization during his services in 1887 and 1888, when he was its first active potentate.

In 1894, Corliss ran as a Republican and defeated incumbent Democrat Levi T. Griffin to be elected as a United States representative from Michigan's 1st congressional district to the Fifty-fourth and to the three succeeding Congresses, serving from March 4, 1895, until March 3, 1903. He served as chairman of the Committee on Election of President, Vice President, and Representatives in the Fifty-fifth through Fifty-seventh Congresses. He lost to Democrat Alfred Lucking in the general election of 1902.

== Retirement and death ==
After leaving Congress, he reengaged in the practice of law in Detroit, where he became a senior member of the law firm of Corliss, Leete & Moody. In November 1917, Corliss married his second wife, Dorothy Montgomery. In 1920, he was chosen a member of the executive committee of the American Bar Association. Also in 1920, Corliss issued an authoritative history of the Detroit lodge of the Scottish Rite, relating in detail the early struggles of the lodge before it became firmly established in Detroit.

He died in Detroit at the age of seventy-eight and is interred there at Woodlawn Cemetery.

U.S. House of Representatives
Preceded by Levi T. Griffin	United States Representative for the 1st congressional district of Michigan; 1895–1903	Succeeded by Alfred Lucking
