= Henry C. Chipman =

American judge (1784–1867)

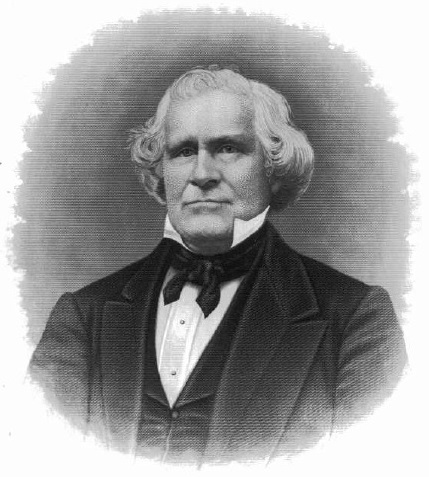

Judge of the Supreme Territorial Court of Michigan
- In office 1827–1832

Personal details
- Born: July 25, 1784 Tinmouth, Vermont, U.S.
- Died: May 31, 1867 (aged 82) Detroit, Michigan, U.S.
- Resting place: Elmwood Cemetery
- Spouse: Martha Mary Logan (m. 1812)
- Children: 6
- Parent: Nathaniel Chipman (father)
- Education: Middlebury College (BA, MA)

Military service
- Branch/service: South Carolina militia
- Rank: Adjutant
- Battles/wars: War of 1812

Henry C. Chipman (July 25, 1784 – May 31, 1867) was a judge of the Supreme Territorial Court of Michigan from 1827 until 1832.

== Early life and education ==
Chipman was the son of Vermont senator Nathaniel Chipman. He studied with his father and Jeremiah Atwater in preparation for entering Middlebury College. He graduated from Middlebury in 1803, and then studied law with his father. In 1806 he received his Master of Arts degree from Middlebury. He moved to Jamaica because of ill health, and resided there for a year.

Upon his return, he taught school in Barnwell, South Carolina, while studying law with Charles Cotesworth Pinckney, and then practiced law in Walterboro, South Carolina.

He served as adjutant of a South Carolina regiment stationed at Beaufort, South Carolina, during the War of 1812.

== Career ==
In 1823, Chipman and his wife decided to move to a state that did not allow slavery, and they settled in Detroit, Michigan. Chipman continued practicing law and was co-publisher of the Morning Herald newspaper. He also served as chief justice of the Wayne County Court from 1825 to 1827. In 1827, Chipman was appointed to the Supreme Court of Michigan Territory and served until 1832. From 1833 to 1835 he served as Detroit's city recorder. He returned to practicing law and, from 1840 to 1844, served as judge of the Wayne County Criminal Court. He then resumed his law practice and also contributed articles to newspapers, writing regularly until shortly before his death. In 1844, he was one of the vice presidents of the Whig National Convention. From 1827 until his death, Chipman was the oldest living alumnus of Middlebury College, and Middlebury awarded him an honorary LL.D. in 1866. Chipman was an Episcopalian and served as a vestryman.

== Personal life and death ==
In 1812, Chipman married Martha Mary Logan. Their children included Henry Logan (1814–1846), Catherine S. (born 1816), Laura B. (1818–1896), Eliza C. (born 1823), Emma (born 1826), and John Logan (1830–1893).

Henry Logan Chipman was an officer in the United States Navy from 1833 until resigning shortly before his death.

Laura B. Chipman was the wife of Henry Laurens Chipman, an officer in the United States Army who attained the rank of brevet brigadier general in the Union Army during the American Civil War.

Eliza Chipman was the wife of William L. Baby.

John Logan Chipman served in the United States House of Representatives.

Chipman died in Detroit on May 31, 1867. He was buried at Elmwood Cemetery, Section A, Lot 166.

== Sources ==
- Henry Chipman at Michigan Supreme Court History
- Henry Chipman at American Biographical History of Eminent and Self-Made Men of Michigan. 1878. Western Biographical Publishing Company (Cincinnati, Ohio) publisher.
