= 5th Connecticut Regiment =

- Active: 1775-1781
- Allegiance: Continental Congress of the United States
- Type: Infantry
- Part of: Connecticut Line
- Engagements: Bunker Hill; Invasion of Canada; New York and New Jersey campaign Battle of Ridgefield; Battle of Germantown; Monmouth; Battle of Stony Point; Hudson Highlands Defense

Commanders
- Notable commanders: Major Thomas Knowlton; Colonel David Waterbury; Colonel Philip Burr Bradley

The 5th Connecticut Regiment was raised on April 27 1775 at Danbury, Connecticut under the command of David Waterbury. The Regiment was one of six formed by the Connecticut Legislature in response to the hostilities at Lexington and Concord, Massachusetts. The Fifth would see its first action during the Invasion of Canada. As was the practice during the first few years of the war, the New England troops were engaged only until year's end and the original Fifth Connecticut Regiment was disbanded on December 13 1775. It would not see National service during 1776, but a State Regiment, organized by Colonel Philip Burr Bradley, did serve in the New York and New Jersey campaign. The Fifth returned to Continental duty at the beginning of 1777. The Regiment went on to fight at the Battle of Ridgefield, Battle of Germantown and the Battle of Monmouth. The Regiment was merged along with the 7th Conn. into the 2nd Conn. on January 1 1781. The Fifth was furloughed June 15 1783 at West Point, New York and disbanded on November 15 1783.
