= 2nd Connecticut Regiment =

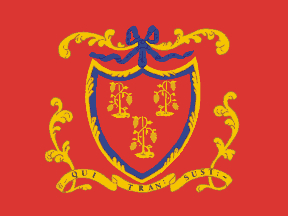
- The Flag of the 2nd Connecticut Regiment (1776-1783)
- Active: 1776–1783
- Disbanded: 1793
- Country: United States
- Allegiance: Continental Congress of the United States
- Branch: Infantry
- Size: 798 soldiers
- Part of: Connecticut Line
- Engagements: American Revolutionary War: Battle of Brandywine; Battle of Germantown; Battle of Monmouth

Commanders
- Notable commanders: Colonel Charles Webb

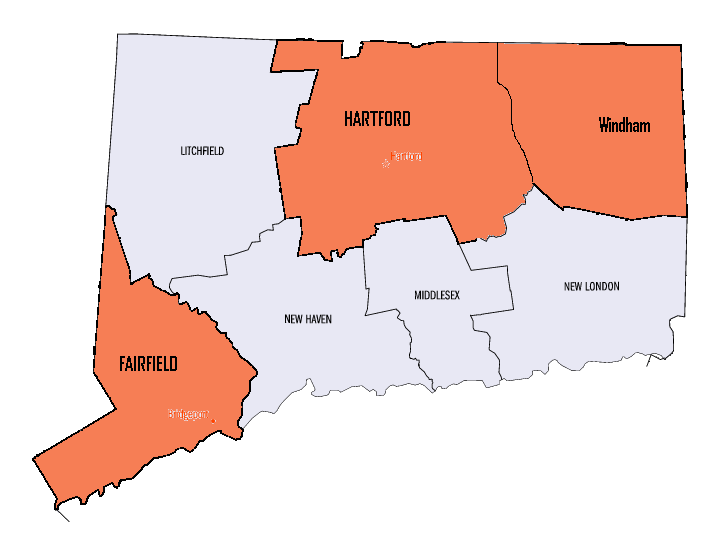
Recruitment areas

The 2nd Connecticut Regiment was a regiment in the Continental Army during the American Revolution. It is not to be confused with the 2nd Connecticut Volunteer Infantry Regiment which served during the American Civil War.

== History ==
The 2nd Connecticut was authorized in the Continental Army on 16 September 1776. It was organized between 1 January and April 1777 at Danbury, Connecticut of eight companies from the counties of Fairfield, Windham, and Hartford in the state of Connecticut and assigned on 3 April 1777 to the 1st Connecticut Brigade of the Highlands Department which protected the southern approaches to West Point on the Hudson River in New York. The regiment was reassigned to McDougall's Brigade on 12 June 1777; then three days later (15 June 1777) it was reassigned to the 2nd Connecticut Brigade.

One month later, 10 July 1777 the regiment was reassigned to 1st Connecticut Brigade. On 13 November 1777 the regiment was reassigned to the 2nd Connecticut Brigade of the Main Continental Army and wintered with Main Army at Valley Forge in Pennsylvania. On 1 May 1779 the 2nd Connecticut Brigade was reassigned to the Highlands department and the regiment was re-organized to nine companies on 11 July 1779.

The regiment was reassigned to the Main Continental Army on 16 November 1779. It was reassigned to the Highland's department on 27 November 1780. On 1 January 1781 the regiment was merged with 9th Connecticut Regiment, re-organized and re-designated as the 3rd Connecticut Regiment of the 1st Connecticut Brigade.

The regiment would saw action in the New York Campaign, Battle of Brandywine, Battle of Germantown and the Battle of Monmouth. The regiment was furloughed 15 June 1783 at West Point, New York and disbanded on 15 November 1783 following the evacuation of New York City by the British Army.

== Commanders ==
- Colonel Charles Webb – 1 January 1777 to 13 March 1778 (transferred)
- Colonel Zebulon Butler – 13 March 1778 to 1 January 1783 (transferred)
- Colonel Heman Swift – 1 January 1781 to 15 June 1783 (furloughed and later discharged)
