= William Rudolf O'Donovan =

American sculptor (1844–1920)

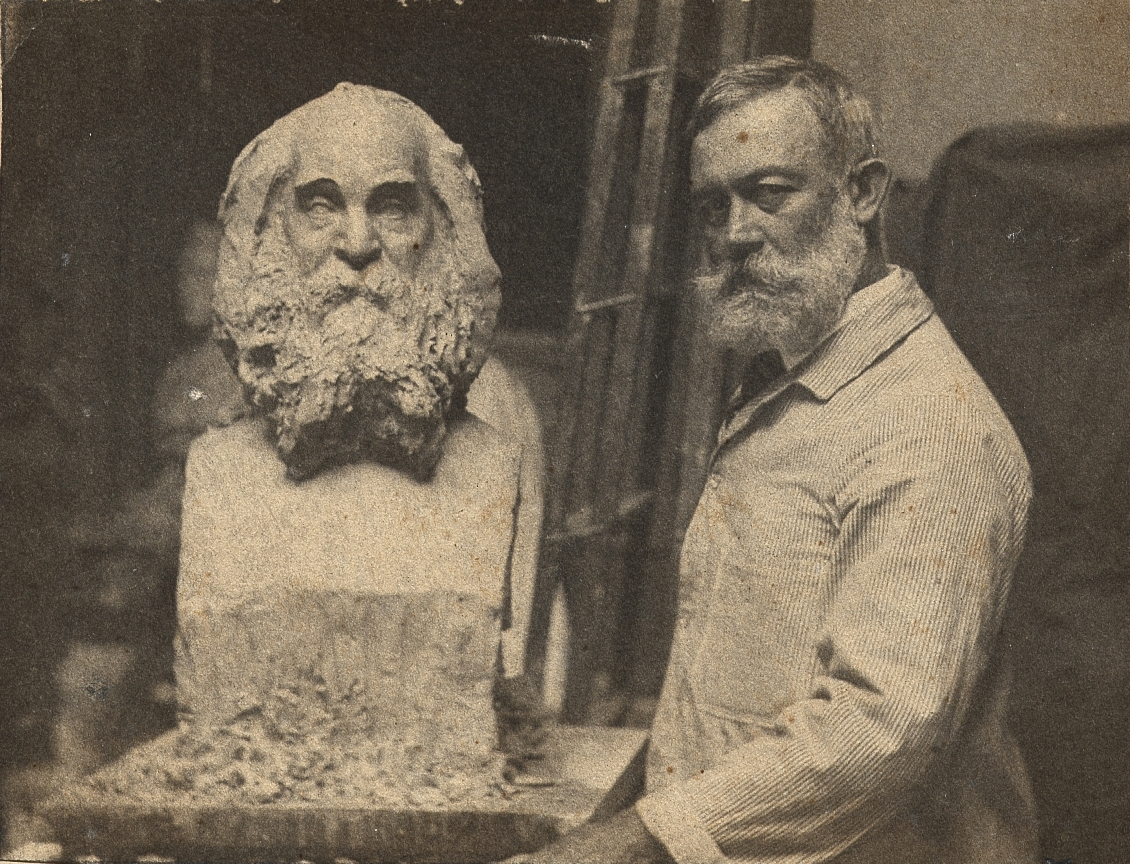
- William Rudolf O'Donovan and his bust of Walt Whitman (May 1891). Photograph by Thomas Eakins.
- Born: March 28, 1844; Preston County, Virginia (now West Virginia)
- Died: April 20, 1920 (aged 76)
- Known for: Sculpture

William Rudolf O'Donovan (March 28, 1844 – April 20, 1920) was an American sculptor.

== Biography ==
O'Donovan was born in Preston County, Virginia (now West Virginia), and taught himself to sculpt. After the Civil War, in which O'Donovan served in the Confederate army, he opened a studio in New York City and became well known as a sculptor, especially of memorial pieces.

In 1878, O'Donovan become an associate of the National Academy of Design. George Washington was a favorite subject of his, and he published a series of papers on Washington portraits. During the 1870s and 1880s he collaborated with Maurice J. Power, politician, sculptor and owner of the National Fine Art Foundry producing many works of public art.

== Selected works ==
- Relief portrait of Bayard Taylor (c. 1870), Beinecke Library, Yale University, New Haven, Connecticut.
- Portrait of Winslow Homer (c. 1878), bronze. Corcoran Gallery of Art, Washington, D.C.
- John Paulding (1880), Captors' Monument, Patriot's Park, Tarrytown, New York.
- Cavalry Officer; Sailor (1880–81), Soldiers' and Sailors' Monument, Lawrence, Massachusetts.
- Bas-relief panels of Herkimer Directing the Oriskany Battle and Combat (1882–84), Oriskany Battlefield Monument, Oriskany, New York.
- George Washington (1883), Plaza Washington, El Paraiso, Caracas, Venezuela.
- Marie Heimlicher (1884), bronze. Smithsonian Institution. Hirshhorn Museum and Sculpture Garden.
- Colonel Daniel Morgan (1885–86), Saratoga Battle Monument, Saratoga National Historical Park, Victory Mills, New York.
- Tower of Victory, Washington's Headquarters State Historic Site, Newburgh, New York.
  - George Washington (1887).
  - Architectural sculptures of Rifleman; Artilleryman; Light Dragoon; and Infantry Line Officer (1888).
- Irish Brigade Monument (1888), Gettysburg Battlefield, Gettysburg, Pennsylvania. A granite Celtic Cross guarded by a life-size bronze statue of an Irish wolfhound.
- Bust of Walt Whitman (1891), unlocated.
- Archbishop Hughes (1891), Fordham University, Fordham, New York.
- Trenton Battle Monument, Trenton, New Jersey.
  - George Washington (1893).
  - Private John Russell and Private Blair McClenachan (1891–93), two statues of 14th Regiment Massachusetts soldiers flanking the monument's entrance.
  - Thomas Eakins modeled two bas-relief panels for the monument's base; Charles Henry Niehaus modeled the third panel.
- Bust of Thomas Eakins (1892), bronze; unlocated. Exhibited at the Columbian Exposition, 1893, item #154.
- Bas-relief panels of President Lincoln and General Grant (1893–94), Soldiers' and Sailors' Arch, Grand Army Plaza, Brooklyn, New York. O'Donovan modeled the men; Thomas Eakins modeled the horses.
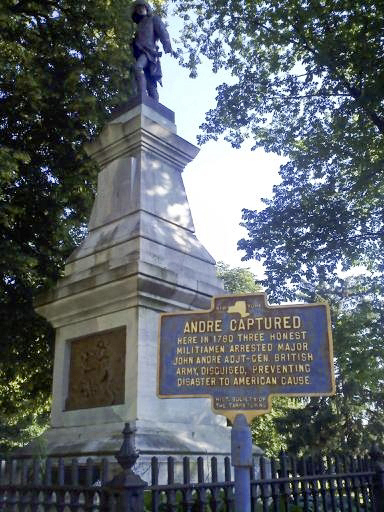
John Paulding (1880), atop the Captors' Monument, Patriot's Park, Tarrytown, New York.

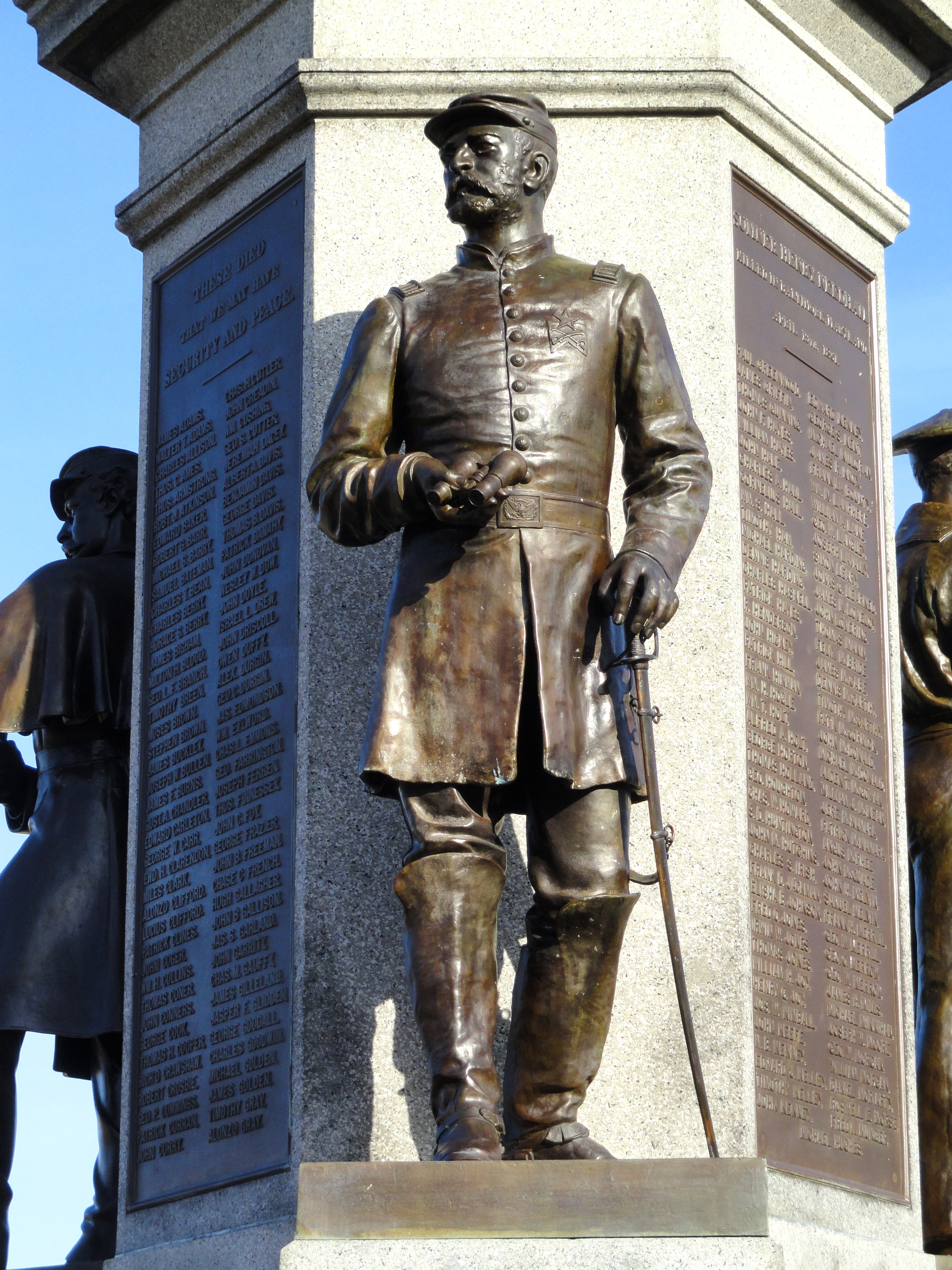
Cavalry Officer (1880–81), Soldiers' and Sailors' Monument, Lawrence, Massachusetts.

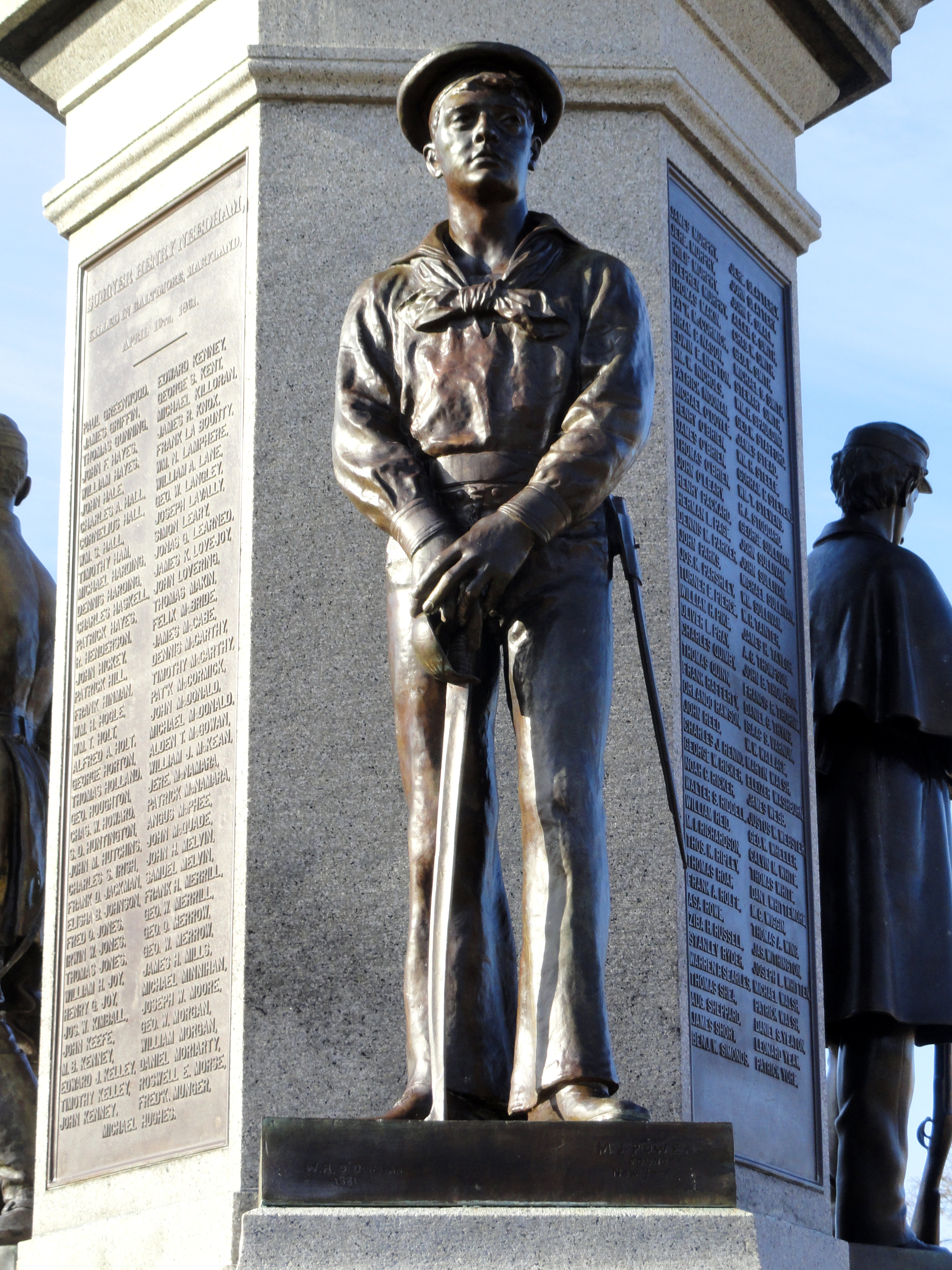
Sailor (1880–81), Soldiers' and Sailors' Monument, Lawrence, Massachusetts.

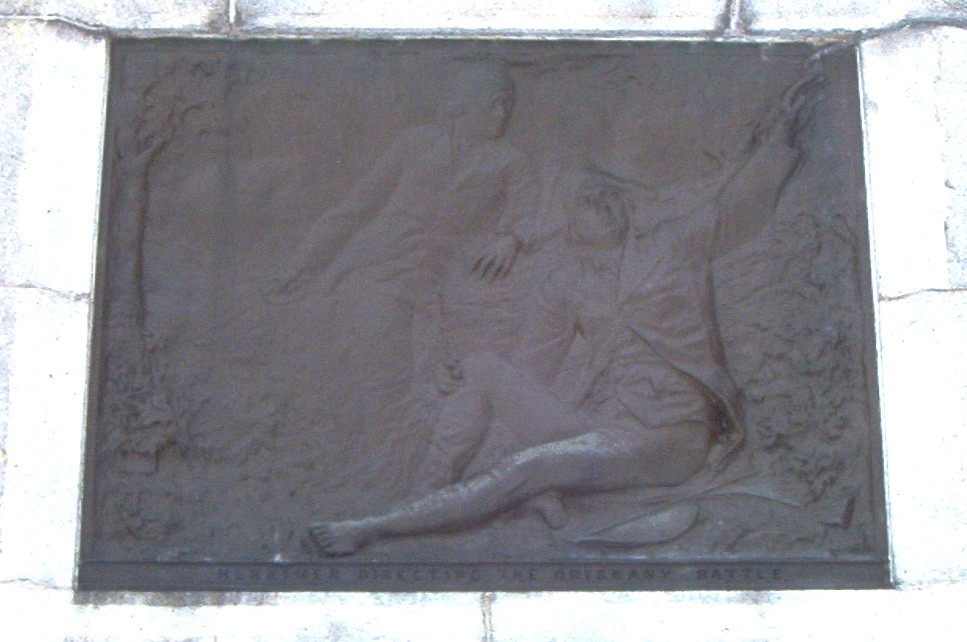
Herkimer Directing the Oriskany Battle (1882–84), Oriskany Battle Monument, Oriskany, New York.

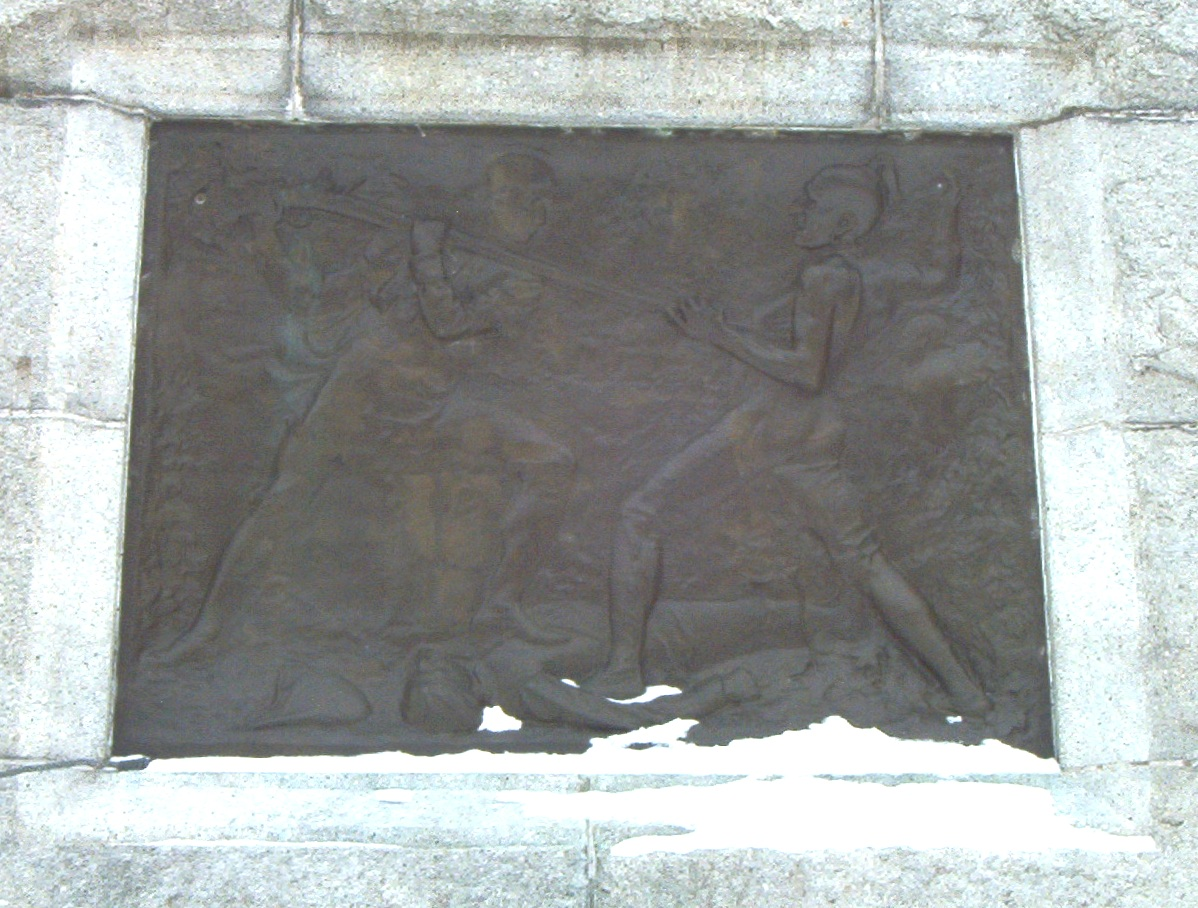
Combat (1882–84), Oriskany Battle Monument, Oriskany, New York.

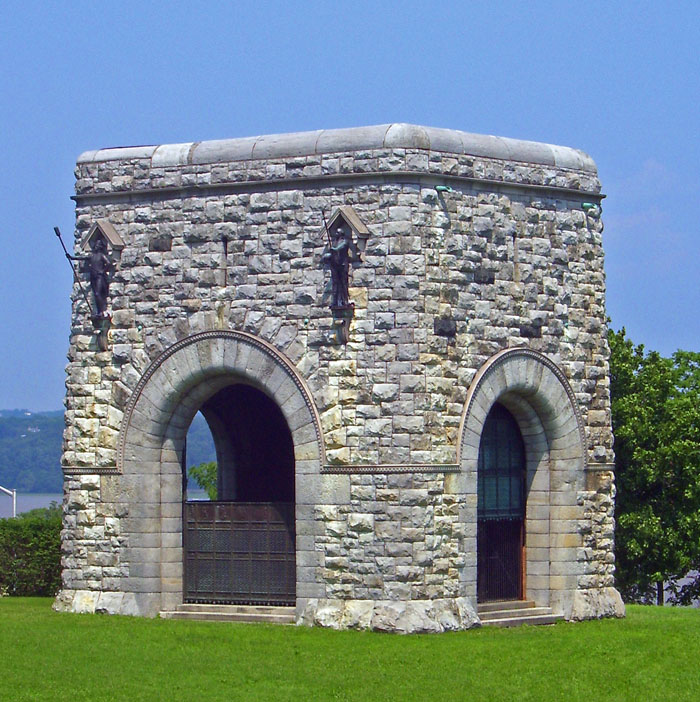
Tower of Victory (1886–88), Washington's Headquarters State Historic Site, Newburgh, New York.

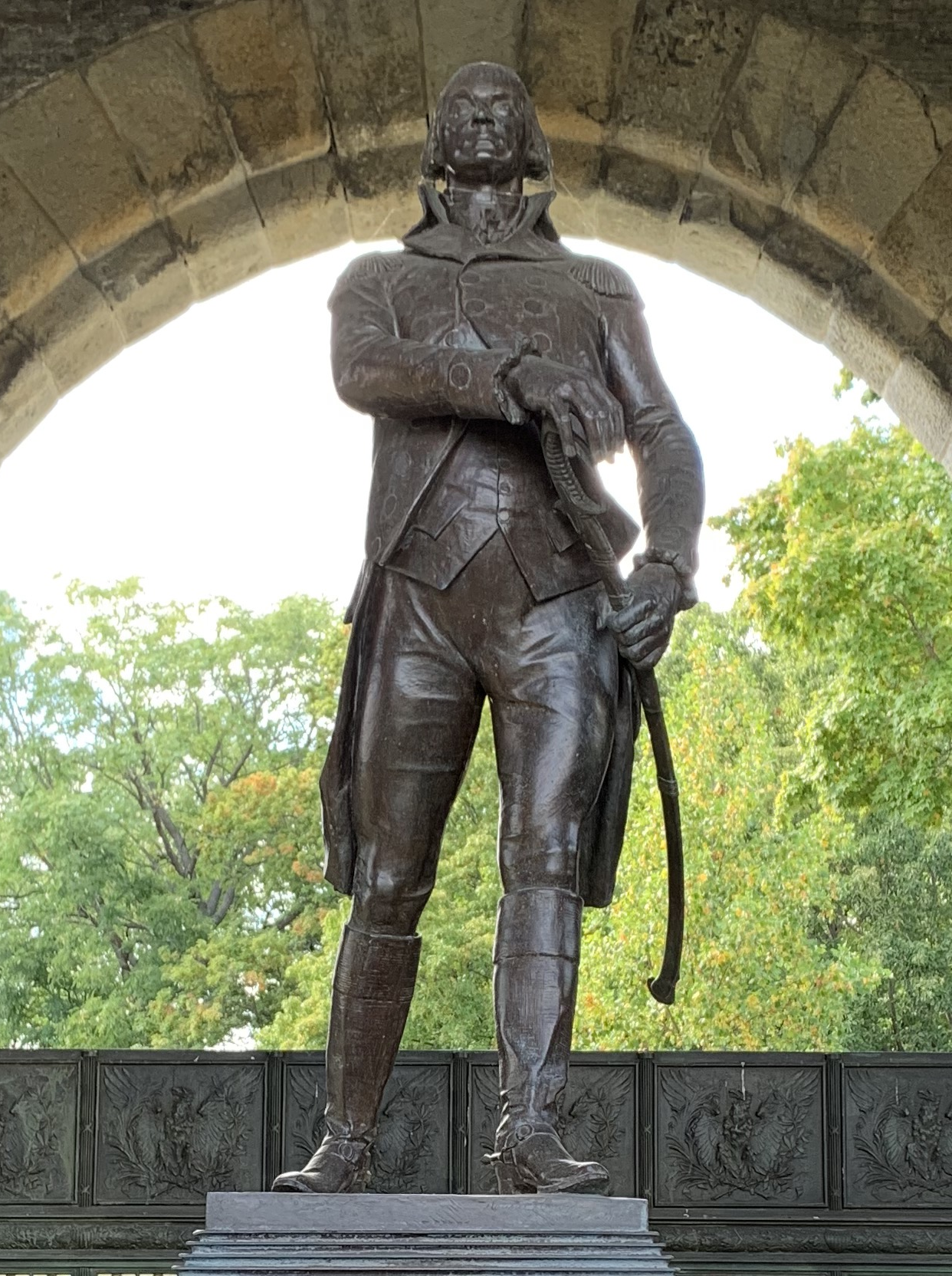
George Washington (1887), Newburgh, New York

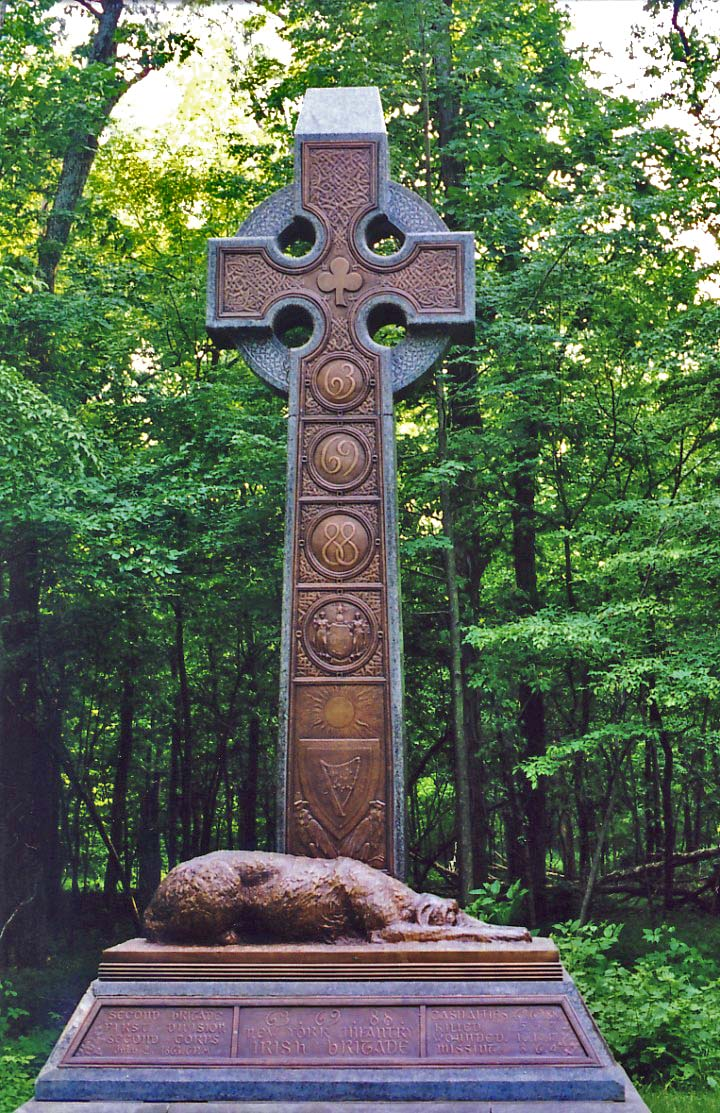
Irish Brigade Monument (1888), Gettysburg Battlefield, Gettysburg, Pennsylvania.

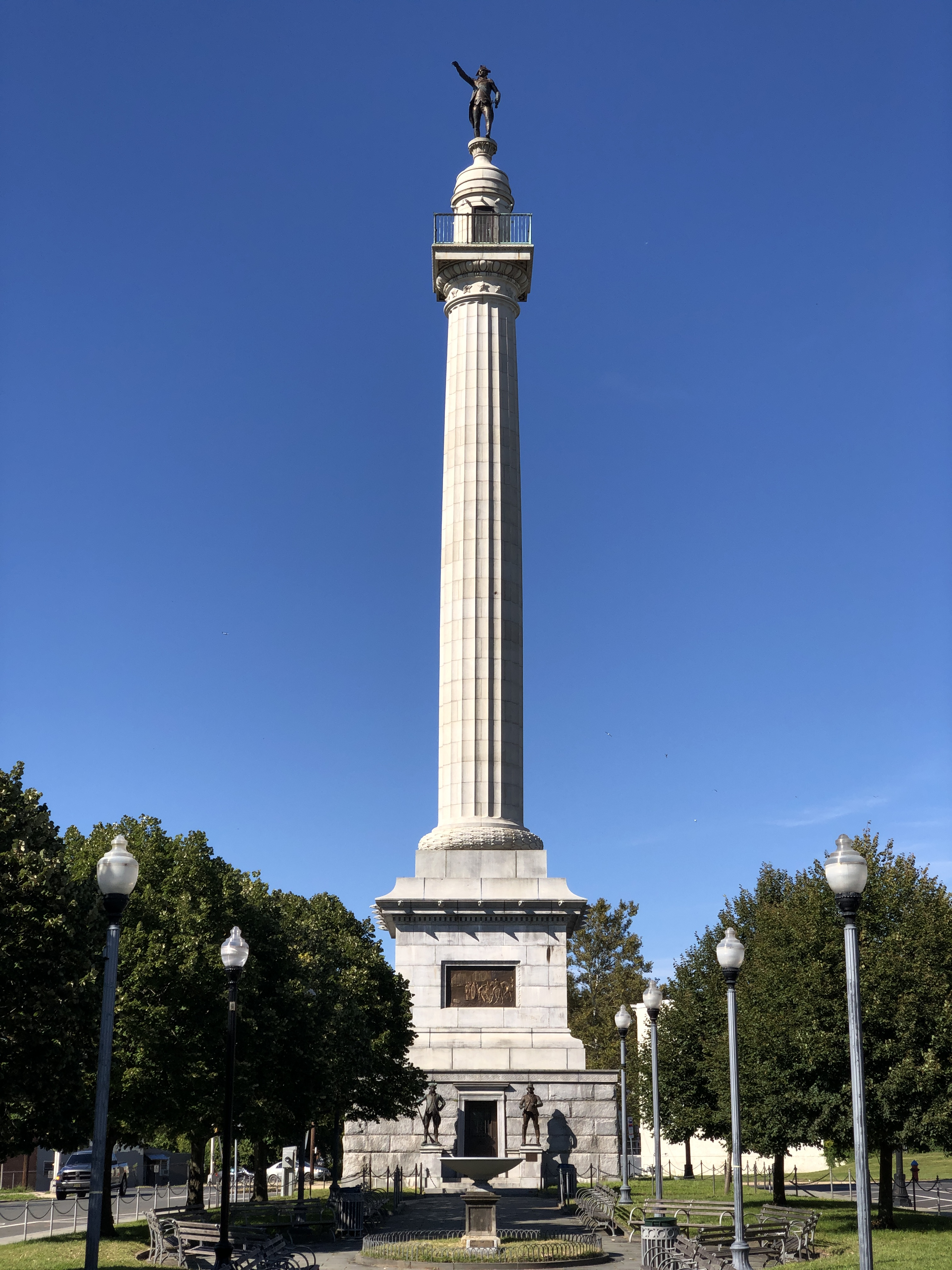
Trenton Battle Monument (1893), Trenton, New Jersey.

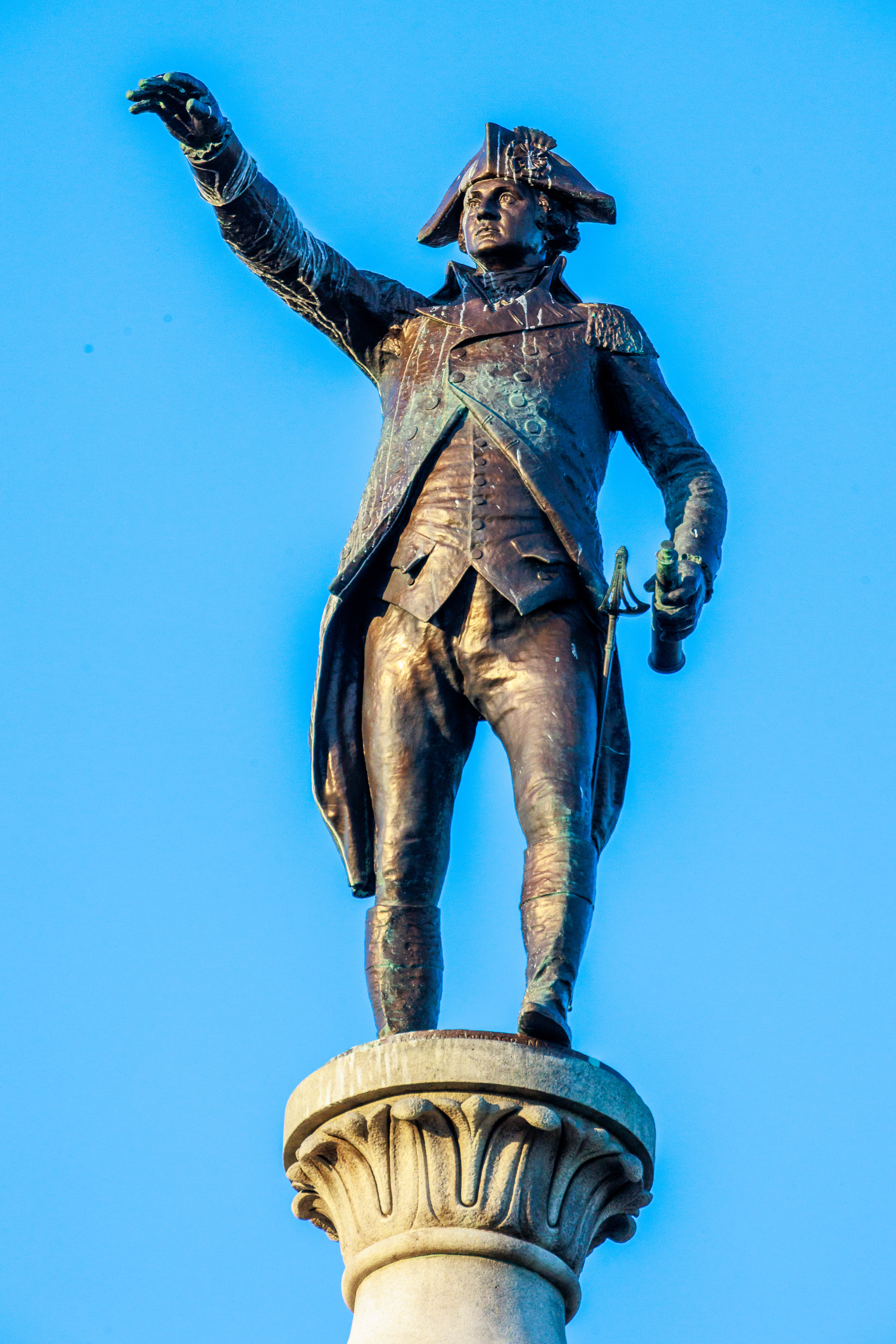
George Washington (1893), Trenton, New Jersey.

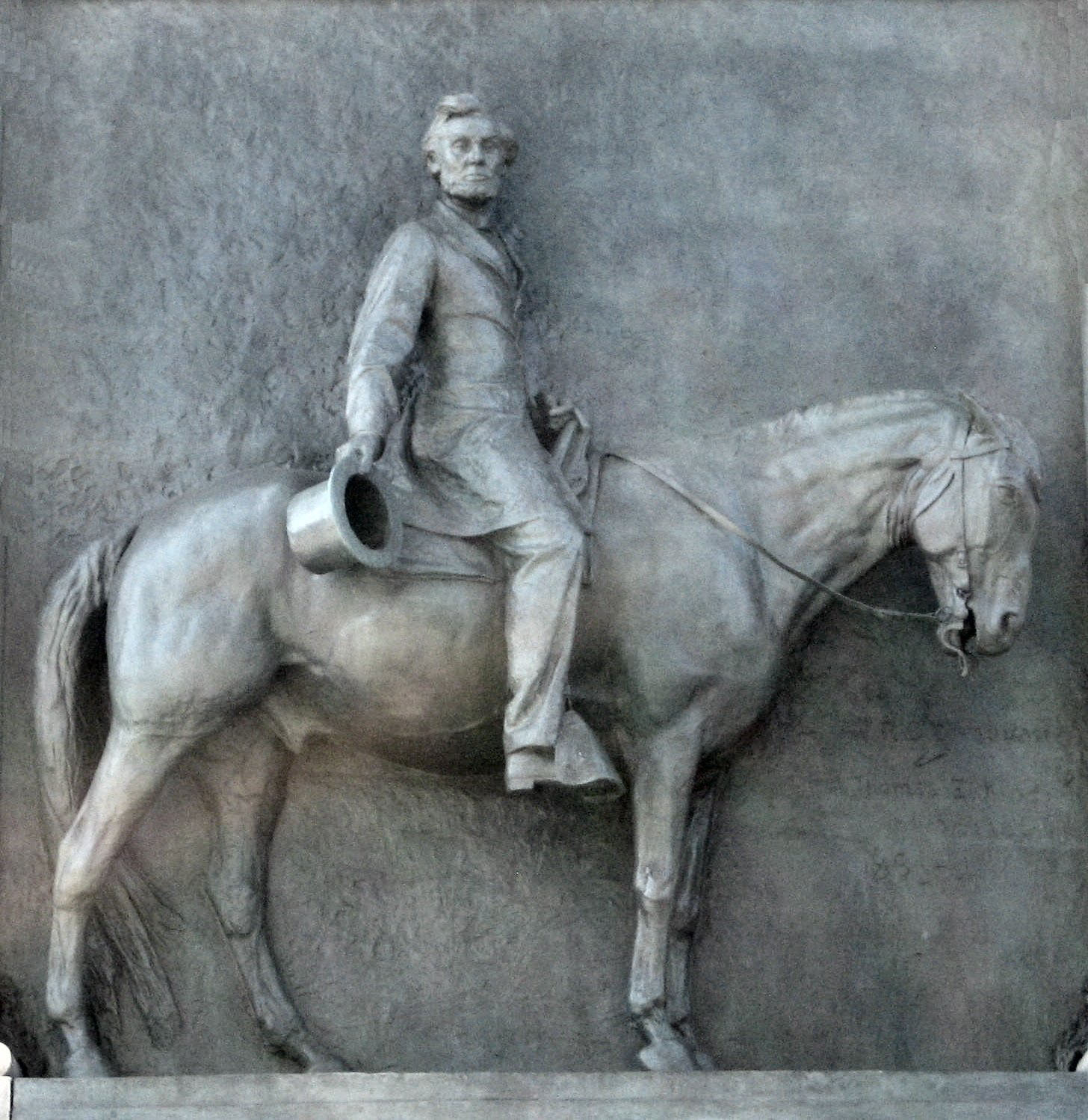
President Lincoln (1893–94), Soldiers' and Sailors' Arch, Grand Army Plaza, Brooklyn, New York.

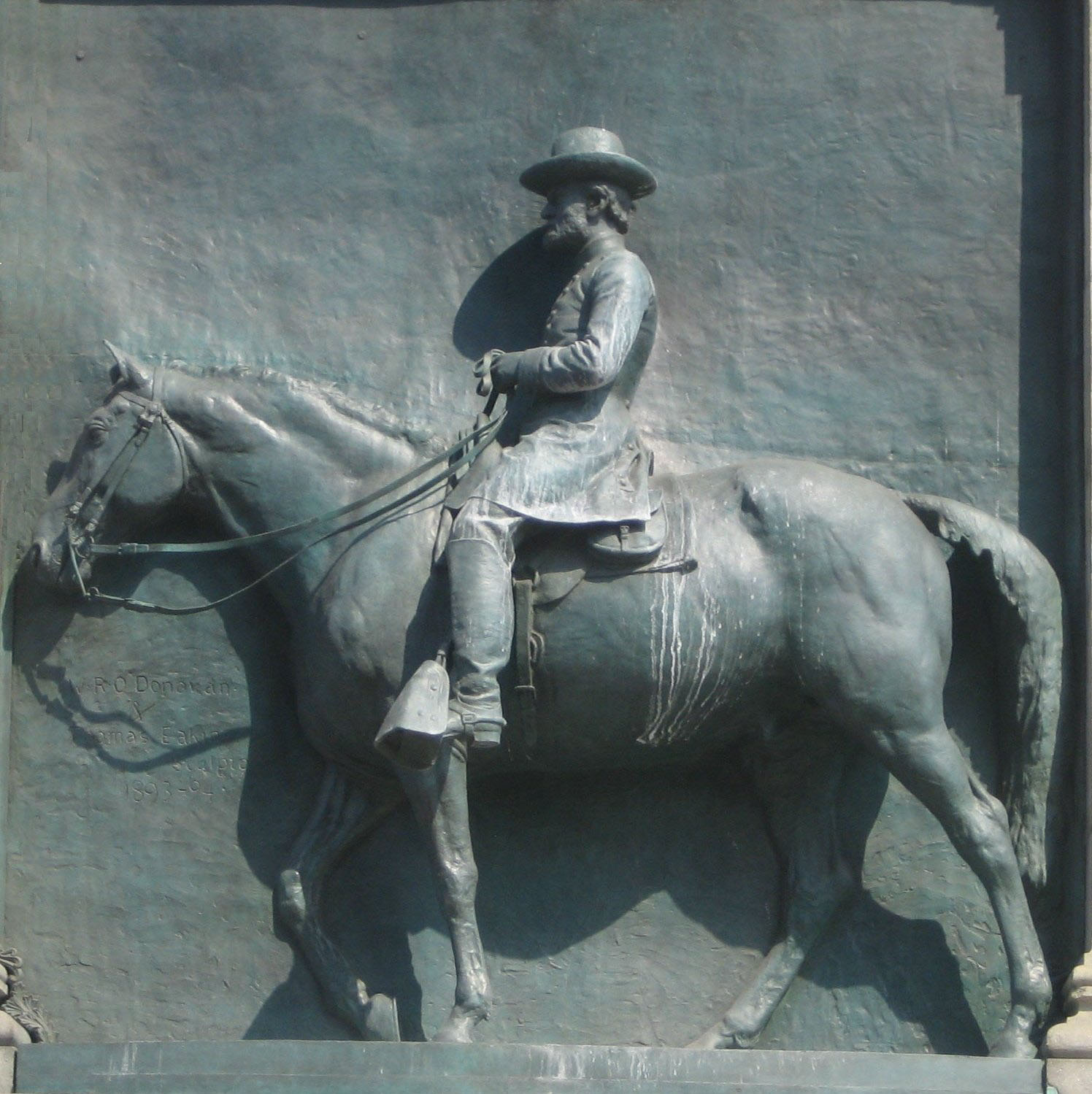
General Grant (1893–94), Soldiers' and Sailors' Arch, Grand Army Plaza, Brooklyn, New York.
