= Grant Castner =

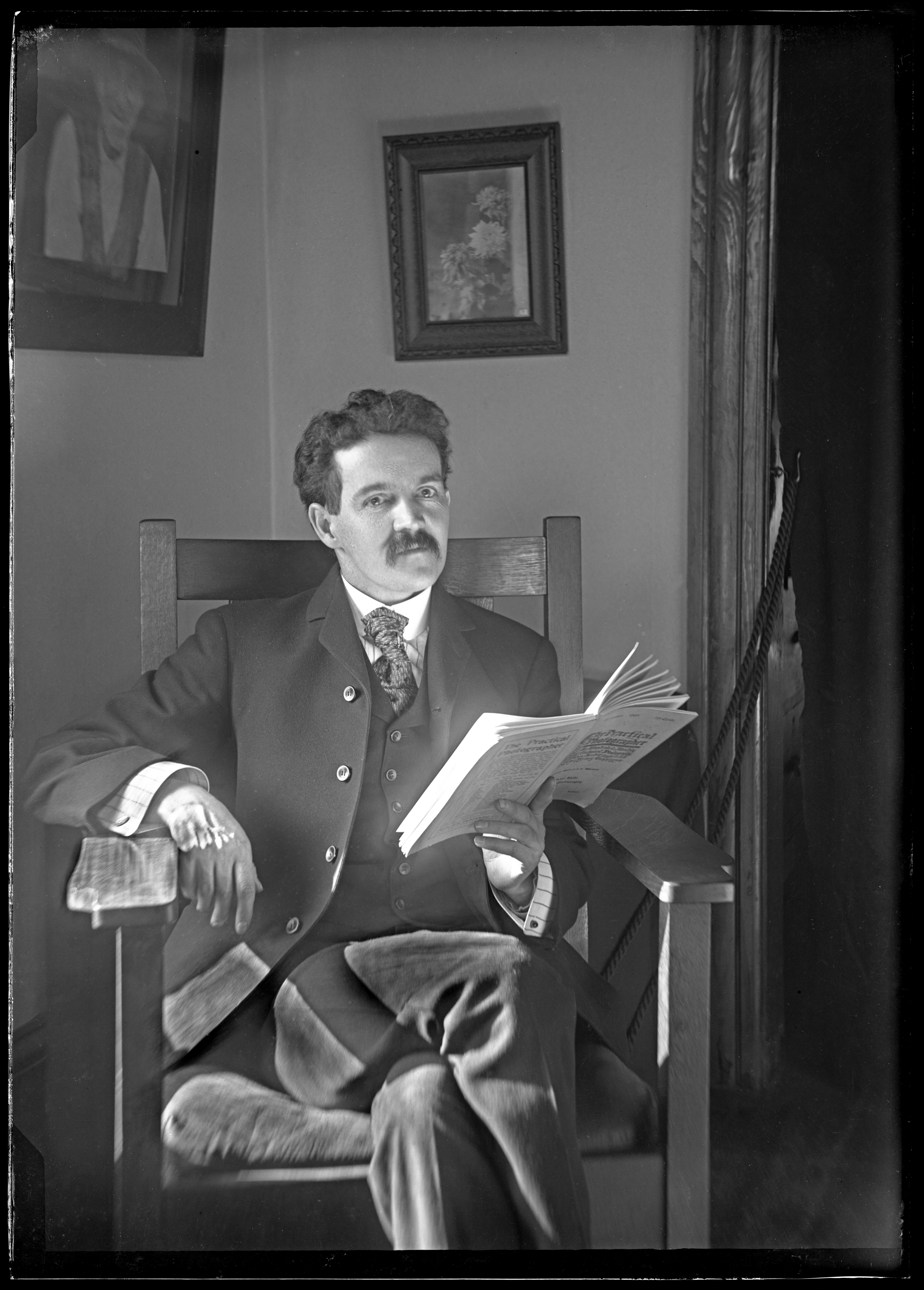
- Self-portrait, 1906
- Born: December 6, 1863; Belvidere, New Jersey, U.S.
- Died: January 30, 1941 (aged 77); Trenton, New Jersey, U.S.
- Resting place: Greenwood Cemetery
- Known for: Photography

Grant Castner (December 6, 1863 – January 30, 1941) was an American photographer working primarily in New Jersey, but also in neighboring Pennsylvania and New York. He is best known for his documentary photography depicting the everyday lives of Americans living at the turn of the 20th century.

== Biography ==
Grant Castner was born on December 6, 1863 in Belvidere, New Jersey, to John Calvin Knox Castner and Ellen Lowry Caster. His grandfather, Reverend Jacob Randolph Castner, was a Presbyterian minister whose congregation was greatly impacted by the infamous 1843 quadruple homicides known as the Changewater Murders. Castner's father was a bookstore owner in Belvidere and he therefore became a voracious reader at an early age. By age 16, he was editing, publishing and distributing his own small town newspaper called The Starry Flag. His journalistic sensibilities led him to an interest in the medium of photography, which he used to document everyday life in the world around him. Castner took his first photographs in the 1880s when he was a young man in his 20s living in Trenton, New Jersey.

== Photography ==
Castner was a self-taught photographer and primarily used glass photographic plates manufactured by the Eastman Kodak Company of Rochester, New York. He also meticulously recorded information about his photographs, including equipment brands, aperture and exposure times, places, dates, and, most importantly, notations about the people whom he was photographing. Castner used a darkroom provided by a local camera club (of which he served as an officer) and likely produced as many as 10,000 photographs through the 1930s, most notably depicting the day-to-day lives of everyday Americans at work and play. He took pictures of African Americans and immigrants, documenting the multi-cultural landscape in which he lived, and used his camera to document the urbanization, industrialization and new transportation technologies unfolding around him. Castner also developed an interest in nature photography. Some of Castner’s photographs echo those of well-known professional contemporaries like Lewis Hine, Alfred Stieglitz, and Rudolf Eickemeyer, Jr. Castner is considered an amateur photographer since he was self-taught and did not sell his work as the primary means to support himself.

== Career and later life ==
In 1885, Castner moved to Trenton, New Jersey, where he worked as a distributor of newspapers and magazines. As a bustling rail hub, the capital city provided a perfect base of operations for his photographic work as he used the Pennsylvania Railroad system for photographic journeys throughout the state and region. One of his recurring trips was to the Inter-state Fair, an annual community festival which he thoroughly documented with his camera. Within the city proper, Castner used a safety bicycle to transport his equipment to shooting locations. Castner was a founding member and longtime secretary of the Trenton Photographic Society, a community camera club for amateurs that was organized in 1897. He shared his printed photographs in public exhibitions and also prepared lantern slides of his work for Magic Lantern projection presentations. Castner’s photographs also appeared in print in such magazines as Frank Leslie’s Illustrated Newspaper and Photo Era. Most prolific during a thirty year period between 1890 and 1920, Castner continued to take pictures until his death in 1941.

== Museum exhibition and legacy ==
Castner is notable for being a talented photographer who was absent from the historical and artistic record before his work was rediscovered after his death, similar to Alice Austen and Vivian Maier. In 2019, a large collection of more than 1,000 of Castner’s original glass plate negatives was donated to the New Jersey State Museum. Five years later, in 2024, the museum organized a major retrospective exhibition of Castner’s life and career. Containing 200 of his most evocative images, the popular exhibit exposed the public to Castner's work and fostered a resurgence of the artist’s reputation as an important American photographer. In February of 2026, the New Jersey State Museum partnered with Rutgers University Press to publish a book about Castner's life and work.

== Gallery ==
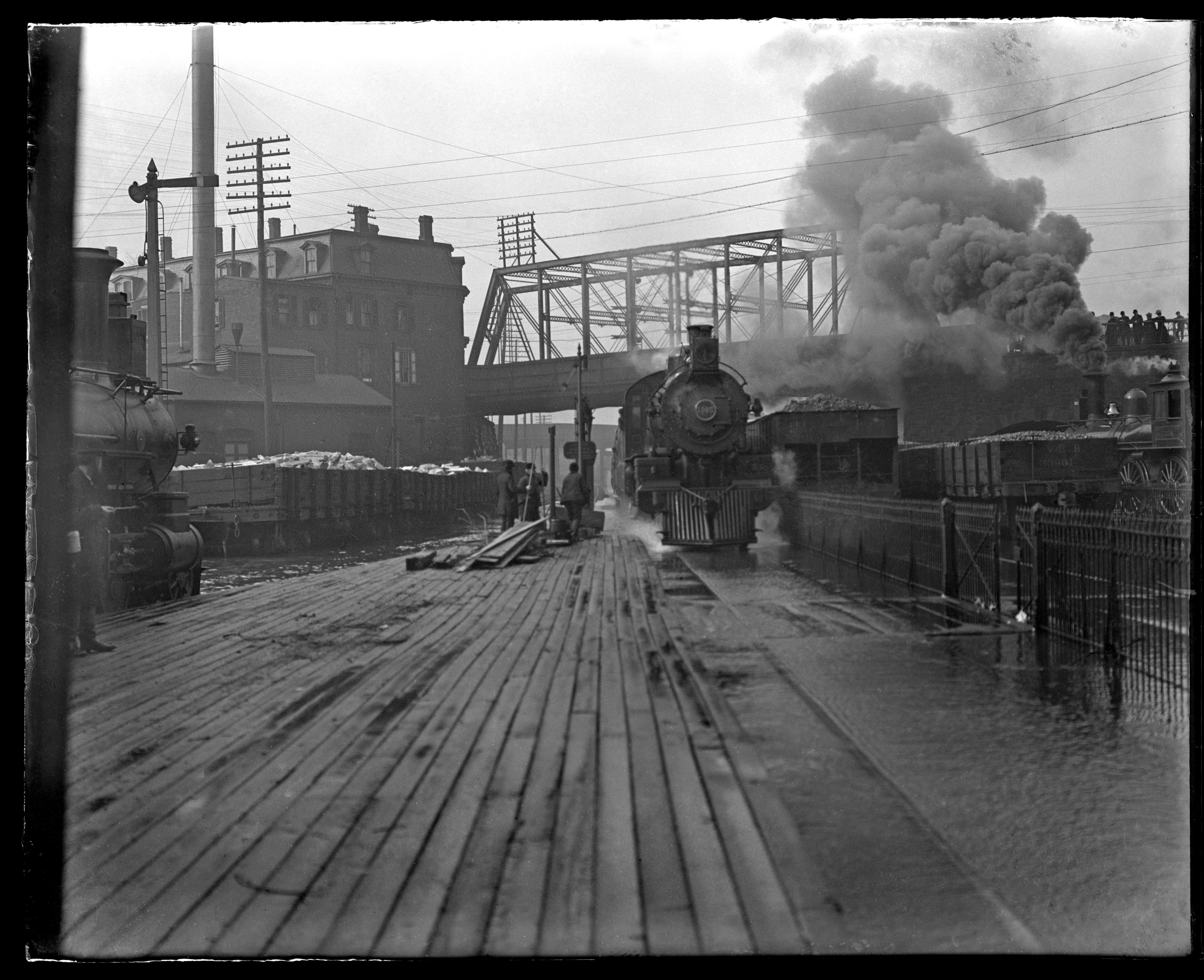
Castner, Grant (1863–1941), Locomotive Entering Station, 1902

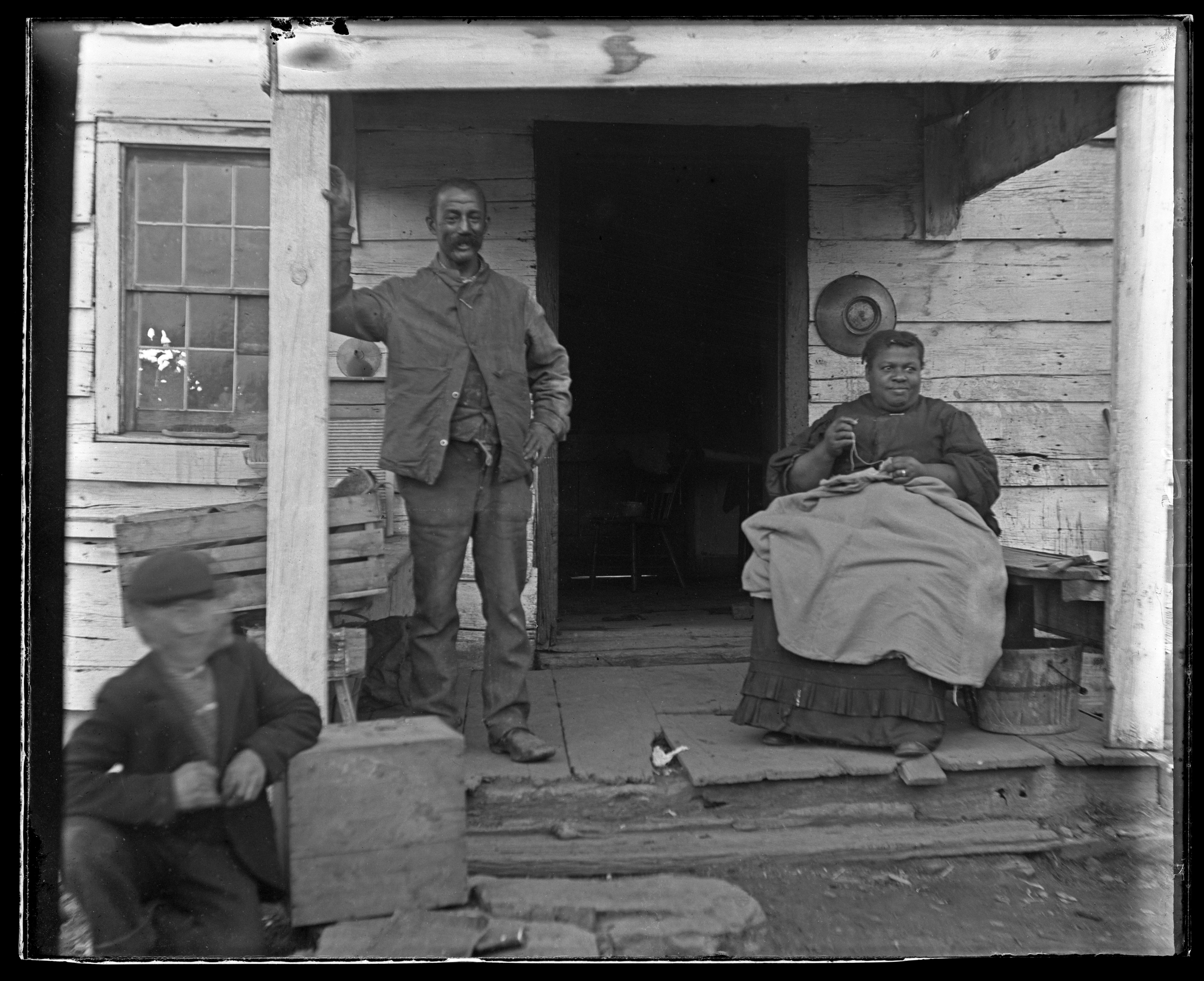
Castner, Grant (1863–1941), Thomas and Susan Dillion, 1899

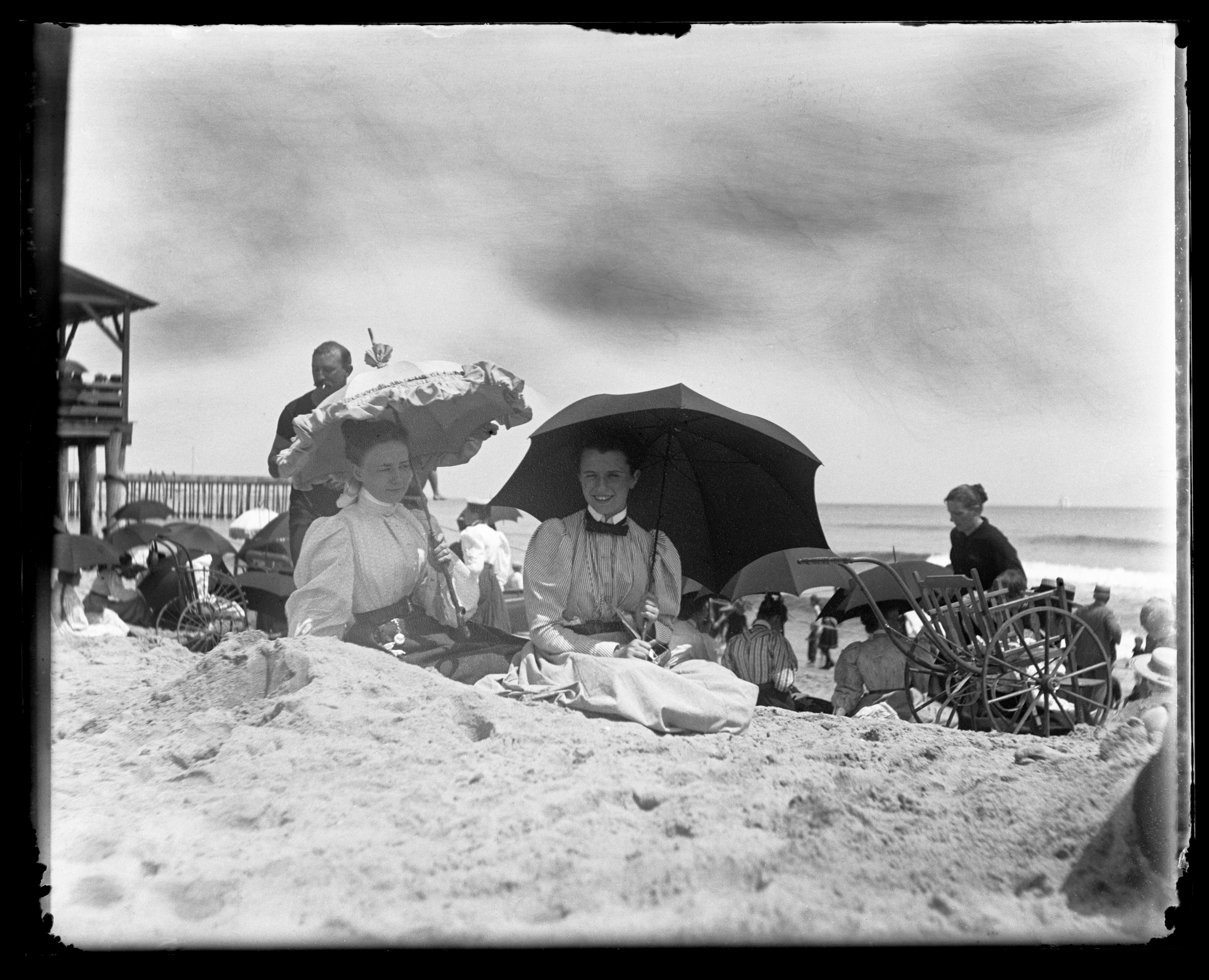
Castner, Grant (1863–1941), On the Sands, 1894

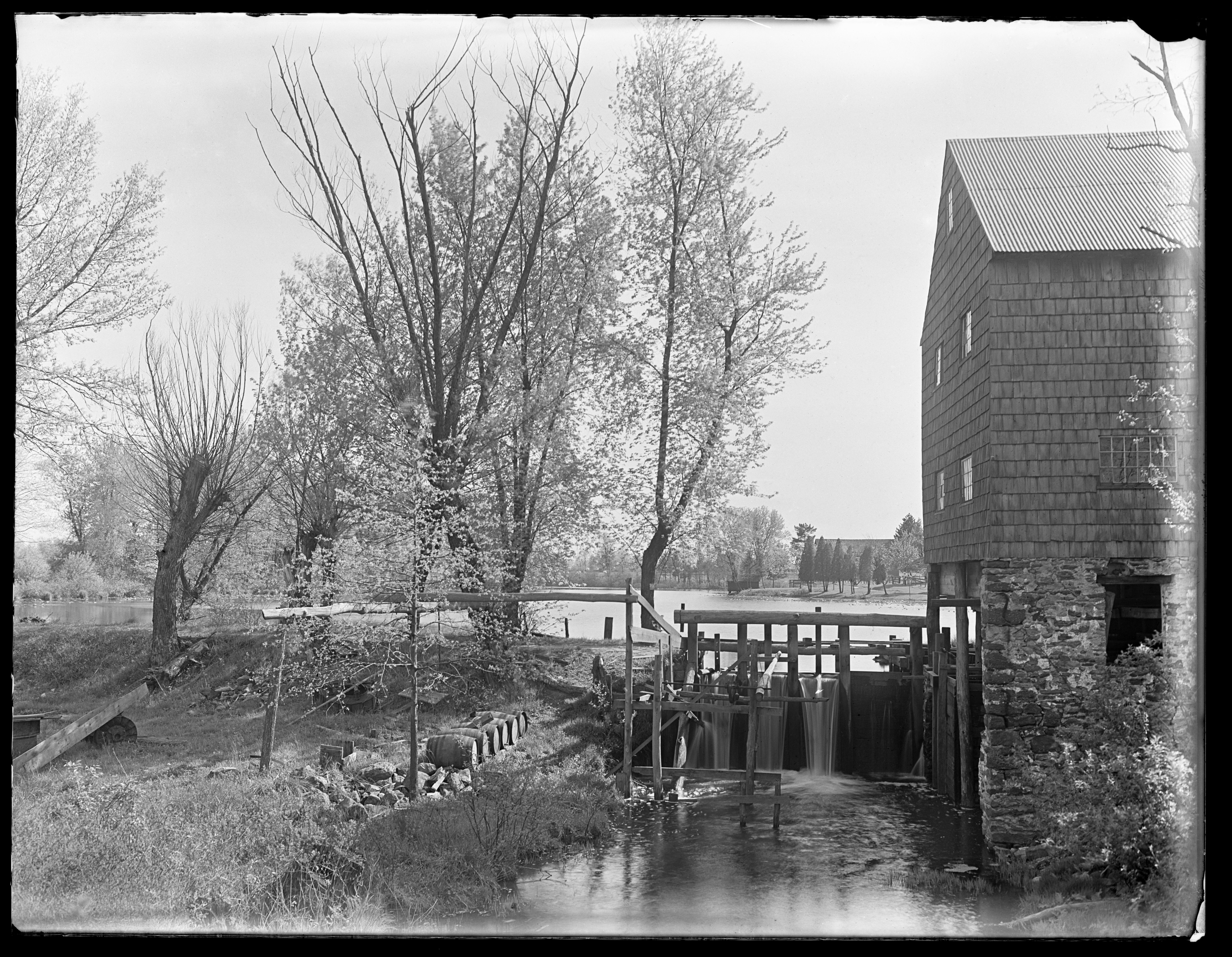
Castner, Grant (1863–1941), Old Mill and Raceway, 1909
