= Herman Trunk =

American painter

Herman Trunk (October 31, 1894 – August 16, 1963), also known as Herman Trunk Jr., was an American painter active in the modernist movement of the 1920s and 1930s. He exhibited with some of the most famous artists of the day. His contributions to figurative abstract art are being recovered by scholars and critics interested in disability studies and religious studies, as he was a deaf artist and a devoted Catholic during a time of anti-Catholic sentiment. His work was part of the painting event in the art competition at the 1932 Summer Olympics.

== Biography ==
Born in New York City to a family of printmakers, Trunk spent much of his life in the family’s home at 135 Essex Street in Brooklyn. He became interested in art while a child at the Dominican Convent School, and as a young adult took night classes in art at the Pratt Institute in Brooklyn. Trunk joined the Army during World War I and served in Europe with the 176th Pursuit Squadron. Upon his return to the states, Trunk resumed his study of painting, working under John Sloan and Hayley Lever at the Art Students League in 1919. He studied with Henry Lee McFee at the League’s summer workshops in Woodstock, New York. According to Meredith Ward, Trunk learned about cubism as a form from McFee, and that with the encouragement of Lever (and critical notice from Forbes Watson in the mid-1920s), Trunk selected watercolor as his main medium. In a 1935 interview in the Brooklyn Eagle newspaper, Trunk explained, "With watercolor . . . you can get a thing done after you have figured out its content and form—while you still feel it. But oils—by the time you're half through, most of the emotion may have died."

== Exhibits and emphases ==
Magazine advertisement for An Exhibition of Hand-Hooked Rugs Designed by Contemporary American Artists, running April 16–28, 1928, in New York City. Designs by Trunk, Thomas Hart Benton, George Biddle, Hugo Gellert, Rosa Pringle Hecht, Zoltan Hecht, Pola Hoffmann, Ilonka Karasz, Henry Varnum Poor, Henriette Reiss, Herman Rosse, Martha Ryther, John Storrs, Mary Tannahill, Buk Ulreich and Nura Woodson Ulreich were fabricated by the New Age Workers' Group in the Blue Ridge Mountains of North Carolina.

In the 1920s Trunk's work appeared in exhibitions by the Art Students League of New York, the Society of Independent Artists, the National Academy of Design, the Art Institute of Chicago, and the Brooklyn Society of Independent Artists. In 1925, New York gallery owner F. Valentine Dudensing became interested in Trunk, and thereafter Trunk showed quite frequently with Dudensing. His first one-man show at Dudensing Galleries took place in November–December 1928, and garnered many positive reviews: “His is a picture offering beauty, in a deliberate arrangement to achieve that effect. The beauty though is alive, for it is veined with the blood of poetry and energy”. His work was frequently compared to Charles Demuth, but once Trunk’s skill with color determination and line design emerged, he was recognized as having a “style extremely individual”. Another critic explained that, “He has a remarkable flair for reducing natural objects to their essential shapes and primary colors—a process saved from any posterlike suggestion because of the sensitive treatment and appreciation for subtleties of color and design”.

In the 1930s and 1940s, Trunk moved increasingly towards geometric and architectural experiments, as his fame grew within the art community in New York City. In 1931, Zoltan Hecht’s School for the New Age reproduced one of Trunk’s sailboat images as a hand-hooked rug, an item which attracted the notice of architect and designer Eugene Schoen. Trunk joined many museum exhibitions, including the first and second biennial exhibitions at the Whitney Museum of American Art in 1932 and 1934. In 1933, his work appeared in the Venice Biennale as part of the Whitney Exhibit; he was the only artist from Brooklyn to be included. During the same period he participated in group exhibitions at the Brooklyn Museum. The depression intervened, and Trunk Brothers printmakers collapsed, as did Dudensing’s gallery. The artist showed in 1938 with the Collectors of American Art in New York. Trunk worked with Marion Grant, of Grant Studios in Brooklyn, holding a one-man exhibition there in March 1939. The New York Sun said of the Grant exhibit, “He will paint in the same composition the outside of a house and its interior as well, present within a single frame three seasons at once, and yet in either case contrive to weld the whole into a decorative entity. It is much like the fragmentary, unrelated, yet overlapping, glimpses that come in dreams, or the way logically disconnected, though vividly realized bits of experience, flash on the drowsing memory when it is not focused intently on any particular thing. With all it is vastly interesting and to be appreciated must be seen”.

After World War I, Trunk’s work included paintings which Meredith Ward describes as “strikingly proto-Pop,” and marks Trunk as a forerunner of the 1960s Pop art genre.

== Resurgence of interest ==
During the 1920s and 1930s, Trunk exhibited alongside some of the most prominent artists in American modernism, those that critics remember today, including Charles Demuth, John Marin, Stuart Davis, Joseph Stella, Joseph Pollet, Edward Hopper, Arthur Dove, and many more. His work was supported by Juliana Force, Frederick C. Bartlett, Chester Holmes Aldrich, H.C. Richardson, Nathaniel Pousette-Dart, Edward Root, Forbes Watson, and others. In a January 20, 1928 letter to Stella Bowen, Ford Madox Ford praised Trunk's work as "really remarkable." Trunk’s recovery as a major American modernist painter began with the spring 1989 exhibition at Herschl & Adler Galleries. There are many reasons Trunk had been overlooked by art historians until the current moment: his background and commitments were traditional, as he was a devoted husband and father. He was nicknamed “The Candlelight Painter” by the media in the 1920s since he maintained his job as a printmaker and painted at night. In addition, Trunk was a faithful Catholic during a period of virulent anti-Catholic sentiment. Reconsideration of Trunk’s commitment to his Catholic faith and its impact on his art is examined by art historian Cynthia Fowler in the 2009 exhibition Herman Trunk: Catholic Modernist and the accompanying exhibition catalogue. A discussion of Trunk's still-life paintings, the work for which he is best known, is also examined in this catalogue by art historian Dena Gilby. In addition, an October 2009 conference in honor of Trunk at Emmanuel College, "Early American Modernism and Religion", turned its attention towards the role of faith to the artistic movement. Most important to understanding Trunk’s lack of visibility today may very well be the fact that a World War I injury rendered Trunk nearly deaf, and as a result social networking at galleries and shows was difficult for him. Two shows appeared in 2009. Emmanuel College in Boston held “Herman Trunk: Catholic Modernist” in September and October; and in October through December Endicott College in Beverly, Massachusetts hosted “Herman Trunk (1894-1963) and the Modernist Still Life." His work as a Catholic artist also has drawn attention from the National Museum of Catholic Art and History. In December 2011, Cynthia Fowler published, "Herman Trunk's Cubist Crucifix: A Case Study," in Religion and the Arts, a publication of Boston College.

== Papers and private collections ==
The Smithsonian Archives of American Art holds Trunk's papers, which include the following: "Letters, writings, photographs, printed material, and a DVD videorecording relating to Trunk's career as a modernist painter. Letters are from Juliana Force, Arthur E. McFarlane, Henry McFee, author B.F. Morrow, and Charles J. Simpson, secretary of the American Veterans Society of Artists, Harry C. Richardson, Gertrude Herdle Moore, Holger Cahill, Audrey F. McMahon, Hugo C.M. Wendel, Kimon Nicolaides, Zoltan Hecht, and Marion M. Grant, among others. Writings include consignment forms and reports from the Dudensing Gallery, New York City, an artist statement, one notebook labeled Egyptian, Assyrian, Greek, Etruscan, and Greco-Roman, one notebook on fresco painting, and two notebooks listing information on art works by Trunk. Photographs are of Trunk, his wife, and others. Printed material consists of scrapbook pages, newspaper clippings, exhibition catalogs and pamphlets mostly concerning Trunk's exhibitions at Dudensing Gallery, New York.”

Many of his paintings remain in the possession of his family and with private collectors. In 2009, The Herman Trunk Foundation was incorporated as part of the effort to preserve the artist's legacy.
