= Zoltan Hecht =

Hungarian-American artist (1890–1969)

1913 portrait of Hecht by Marguerite Zorach

Zoltan Hecht (1890–1969) was a Hungarian-born American artist.

== Biography ==
Magazine advertisement for An Exhibition of Hand-Hooked Rugs Designed by Contemporary American Artists, running April 16–28, 1928, in New York City. Designs by Hecht, Thomas Hart Benton, George Biddle, Hugo Gellert, Rosa Pringle Hecht, Pola Hoffmann, Ilonka Karasz, Henry Varnum Poor, Henriette Reiss, Martha Ryther, John Storrs, Mary Tannahill, Herman Trunk, Buk Ulreich and Nura Woodson Ulreich were fabricated by the New Age Workers' Group in the Blue Ridge Mountains of North Carolina.

Zoltan Hecht came to the United States with his family when he was 12 years old, and the family settled in Cleveland, Ohio. Hecht studied at the Cleveland School of Art. He moved to New York in 1913. He and his wife, Rosa Hecht (American, born 1890), lived in New York, and together established the New Age Association. The Association included their School for the New Age (1924–1931), established in Saluda, North Carolina. The purpose of the school was to train students in the crafts. An article in Nature Magazine is dedicated to the New Age project and establishes the year of school's beginning as 1924.

By 1928, the Hechts were gaining recognition for their New Age hooked rugs. The rugs were fabricated by the School for the New Age, but designed by the Hechts and other artists and designers, including Pola Hoffmann, Hugo Gellert, Ilonka Karasz, Herman Rosse and Herman Trunk. An exhibition of their rugs, along with hooked rugs designed by American artist Ralph Pearson's Design Workshop, was held at the Art Center in 1928. The Hechts also established the New Age Gallery, one of the first co-op galleries in New York City.

Hecht was among the group of avant-garde artists living in New York in the first half of the twentieth century. He was good friends with the well-known artists William and Marguerite Zorach, demonstrated by several portraits of him created by Marguerite.

During his lifetime, Hecht's work was well received. Art critic Walter Rendall Story took note of his New Age designs in an article for the New York Times. Two solo exhibitions of his work are noteworthy. In 1943, his watercolors were on view at the Nicholas M. Acquavella Galleries in New York. In 1981, a retrospective of Hecht's work was held at the Passaic County Community College in New Jersey.
