= Herman Rosse =

American art director

Hermann Rosse
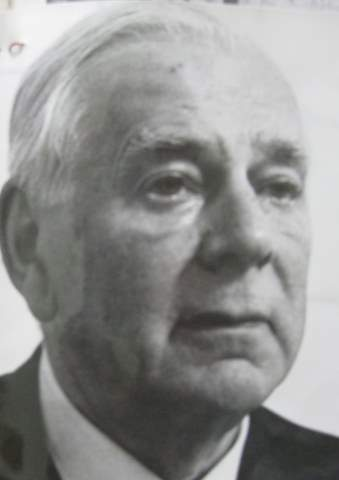
- Born: 1 January 1887; The Hague, Netherlands
- Died: 13 April 1965 (aged 78); Nyack, New York, U.S.
- Occupations: Architect; illustrator; painter; theatrical designer; director
- Years active: 1909-1960

Hermann Rosse (1 January 1887 – 13 April 1965) was a Dutch-American architect, illustrator, painter, theatrical designer, and art director. He won the Academy Award for Best Production Design for the film the King of Jazz.

== Early life ==
He was born in The Hague, Netherlands, and died in Nyack, New York. Herman was the second child of Carl Rosse (8 March 1857 at Kassevitz - ?) and Jacoba Susanna de Haan. The elder sister of Herman, Bertha Suzanna (SUZE) Rosse (The Hague, 1 September 1884 – 17 April 1968) became a well-known Dutch painter.

== Career ==
Magazine advertisement for An Exhibition of Hand-Hooked Rugs Designed by Contemporary American Artists, running April 16–28, 1928, in New York City. Designs by Rosse, Thomas Hart Benton, George Biddle, Hugo Gellert, Rosa Pringle Hecht, Zoltan Hecht, Pola Hoffmann, Ilonka Karasz, Henry Varnum Poor, Henriette Reiss, Martha Ryther, John Storrs, Mary Tannahill, Herman Trunk, Buk Ulreich and Nura Woodson Ulreich were fabricated by the New Age Workers' Group in the Blue Ridge Mountains of North Carolina.

Herman Rosse studied at the Academy of Art in The Hague and trained in architecture and design at the Delft Polytechnic School and the South Kensington College of Art in London. From 1908 to 1910 he attended Stanford University in California, earned his B.A. in architecture, and designed several residences. He spent much of the summer in 1909 at the nearby art colony of Carmel-by-the-Sea and contributed his paintings to the Third Annual Exhibition of the Carmel Arts & Crafts Club. From 1911 to 1913 he produced most of the decorative interior designs – including paintings, stained glass, tiles, and marquetry – for the Peace Palace at The Hague; and while working there he met his future wife, Sophia Helena Luyt (1891–1982), a landscape architect who was responsible for the design of the formal gardens. After their marriage in London on 14 June 1913, they moved to Palo Alto, California, where Rosse was commissioned to design decorations for the Netherlands pavilion at the 1915 Panama–Pacific International Exposition in San Francisco. He received a medal of honor for this commission. In 1914 he became an exhibiting member of the exclusive San Francisco Sketch Club. The many exhibitions of his watercolors, murals, and theatrical models at private and public art galleries in the San Francisco Bay Area, including the Palace of Fine Arts, San Francisco Art Association and Oakland Art Gallery, consistently received glowing reviews. Beginning in the spring of 1917 he was appointed the Instructor of Decorative Design at the California School of Fine Arts, today's San Francisco Art Institute. Rosse designed sets for the Forest Theatre in Carmel, Art Theatre of Palo Alto, and The Playhouse in Santa Barbara. In 1918, he moved to Illinois, where he accepted an appointment to head the Design Department of the School at the Art Institute of Chicago. In addition to teaching, he took private commissions for interiors, fabric designs and book illustrations, and created sets for the stage in conjunction with Ben Hecht, Kenneth Macgowan, the Goodman Theater, and Mary Garden's Chicago Grand Opera Company. In April 1919 his work was included in the highly popular Exhibition of American Stage Designs at the Bourgeois Galleries in New York City, along with contributions by Macgowan, the incomparable James Blanding Sloan, Robert Edmond Jones, Norman Bel Geddes, Joseph Urban, and many others. This exhibition traveled across the United States and closed at the University of California, Berkeley. His 1921 solo exhibition at the Arden Galleries in New York City received rave reviews. Also, in 1921, Rosse provided stunning illustrations for Ben Hecht's column in the Chicago Daily News; These were collected into a book titled, 1001 Afternoons in Chicago, which also featured Rosse's strikingly bold pen drawings. In 1923 Rosse moved with his family to New City in Rockland County, New York. He was already familiar with the New York theatre world, and now became more closely involved with drama, vaudeville, musicals, and even symphony orchestras. He created the sets for the Ziegfeld Follies (1922), Casanova and The Swan (1923), Gershwin's Rhapsody in Blue (1926), The Great Magoo (1932), and Ulysses in Nighttown (1958); he authored and co-authored several publications and even designed a movie theatre where audiences could sit on either side of a gigantic screen. Between 1929 and 1933 he worked in Hollywood, California designing scenery for numerous plays. While under contract for Universal Pictures he created the innovative sets for the films Frankenstein, Strictly Dishonorable, and Emperor Jones. He worked as the Art Director on John Murray Anderson's film the King of Jazz, starring Paul Whiteman and his Orchestra, for which Rosse's imaginative and technically innovative designs earned him the first Academy Award for Art Direction (now in the Chapin Library). The Theatre Arts Monthly, a magazine that frequently showcased Rosse's work, published an article on "Cinema Design" which highlighted with photographs his other films, including, The Murders of the Rue Morgue, East is West, Boudoir Diplomat, and Resurrection.

Rosse worked in theatre in London and the Netherlands, taught as the Professor of Decorative Art at the Technische Hoogeschool in Delft, and designed Dutch pavilions at world's fairs in Brussels, Paris, and New York. He also created plans for subdivisions in several Dutch cities. In 1948 Rosse was appointed Resident Stage designer at the Paper Mill Playhouse in Millburn, New Jersey. He worked there for a dozen years, while also editing Chapter One, the newsletter of the Greater New York chapter of the American National Theatre and Academy (ANTA). In 1949, he won a competition to design the Tony Award, the silver prototype of which is in the Chapin Library. Rosse died in Nyack, New York in April 1965.

Since 1988 members of the Rosse family have donated books, manuscripts, paintings, drawings, prints, plans, photographs, documents, and memorabilia concerning the work of Herman and Helena Rosse to Chapin Library, Williams College Williamstown, Massachusetts (USA).

== Filmography ==
- The Emperor Jones (1933)
- Strictly Dishonorable (1931)
- Resurrection (1931)
- Frankenstein (1931)
- East Is West (1930)
- King of Jazz (1930)
- Oriente y occidente (1930)
