= Nura Woodson Ulreich =

American artist, muralist, author and illustrator (1899–1950)

Nora Woodson Ulreich
- Born: Nura Woodson; 1899; Kansas City, Missouri, U.S.
- Died: October 26, 1950 (aged 50–51); New Rochelle, New York, U.S.
- Other names: Nura; Nura Ulreich; Nora W. Ulreich
- Education: Kansas City Art Institute
- Occupations: Artist; Muralist; Children's book author; Children's book illustrator
- Years active: 1932–1950
- Spouse: Edward Buk Ulreich

Nora Woodson Ulreich (1899 – October 26, 1950), known professionally as Nura, was an American artist, muralist, children's book author and illustrator.

== Early life and education ==
Magazine advertisement for An Exhibition of Hand-Hooked Rugs Designed by Contemporary American Artists, running April 16–28, 1928, in New York City. Designs by Ulreich, Thomas Hart Benton, George Biddle, Hugo Gellert, Rosa Pringle Hecht, Zoltan Hecht, Pola Hoffmann, Ilonka Karasz, Henry Varnum Poor, Henriette Reiss, Herman Rosse, Martha Ryther, John Storrs, Mary Tannahill, Herman Trunk and Buk Ulreich were fabricated by the New Age Workers' Group in the Blue Ridge Mountains of North Carolina.

Ulreich was born in Kansas City, Missouri. Her father was a Confederate veteran who had settled in Kansas City. She grew up there, ultimately attending the Kansas City Art Institute.

== Career ==
A multidisciplinary artist, Ulreich was also an author, painter, muralist, textile artist and illustrator. She collaborated frequently with her husband Edward Buk Ulreich.

Ulreich's work is included in the permanent collections of the San Diego Museum of Art, the Smithsonian American Art Museum, the Walker Art Center and the David Winton Bell Gallery at Brown University.

== Personal life ==
Ulreich was married to Hungarian-born artist Edward Buk Ulreich.

== Books ==
- Stories (1932)
- The Buttermilk Tree (1934)
- Nura's Garden of Betty & Booth (1935)
- The Silver Bridge (1937)
- Nura's Children Go Visiting (1943)
- All Aboard, We Are Off (1944)
- The Mitty Children Fix Things (1946)
- The Kitten Who Listened (1950)
