= Ulreich =

Ulreich is a surname. Notable people with the surname include:

- Edward Buk Ulreich (1884–1966), American artist
- Nura Woodson Ulreich (1899–1950), American artist
- Sven Ulreich (born 1988), German footballer

== See also ==
- Ulrich
