= Karasz =

Karasz may refer to:

== Places ==
- Kárász, a village in Hungary

== People ==
- Anna Kárász, kayaker; see List of world records in canoeing
- Ilonka Karasz (1896-1981), industrial designer and illustrator
- Mariska Karasz (1898-1960), fashion designer and textile artist
