= The Boy from the Basement =

2004 young adult novel by Susan Shaw

The Boy from the Basement is a young adult book by Susan Shaw published in 2004.

== Plot ==
Charlie is a twelve-year-old boy that has been forced to live in his basement all of his life. He has no idea what the outside world is like. Charlie has to scavenge for food when his psychotic father goes to sleep, and he must go to the bathroom in the yard. His father brainwashed him into thinking that he deserves the abuse. When Charlie accidentally goes into the outside world, he collapses and wakes up in a hospital. He is then sent to a foster home. With the help of his foster family and a psychologist, he tries to get over his psychological trauma and get used to the outside world. Charlie eventually gets used to the outside world, but still in fear of his nightmares that his dad will one day take him from his foster family. During his time in the outside world Charlie makes a new friend, Aaron, and his foster mother has two new children. He eventually overcomes his fear of his dad coming to get him.

== Reception ==
Matt Berman, of Common Sense Media, said that "even though Charlie's recovery is slow, it is still a powerful and hopeful story".

== Awards ==
- New York Public Library Book for the Teen Age 2005
- A Junior Library Guild Selection
- Texas Tayshas Reading List
- Barnes & Noble Discover Great New Writers Selection
- Starred Kirkus Review

== Nominations ==
- Maine Student Book Award
