= Pola Stout =

American designer (1902–1984)

- Stout with husband Rex Stout, 1944
- Born: Josefine Pola Weinbach; January 8, 1902; Stryj, Austria-Hungary
- Died: October 12, 1984 (aged 82); Stamford, Connecticut, U.S.
- Other name: Pola Hoffmann
- Occupation: Textile designer
- Spouses: Wolfgang Hoffmann (m. 1925; div. 1932) Rex Stout (m. 1932; died 1975)
- Children: 2

Josefine Pola Stout (née Weinbach, January 8, 1902 – October 12, 1984) was an American designer best known for creating fine woolen fabrics. Born in Stryi, she studied with Josef Hoffmann at the Kunstgewerbe Schule in Vienna, and designed for the Wiener Werkstätte before she immigrated to the United States in 1925 with her first husband, architect and designer Wolfgang Hoffmann. Wolfgang and Pola Hoffmann became a prominent interior design team that contributed to the development of American modernism in the early 20th century. They dissolved their successful partnership in 1932, when she married popular mystery author Rex Stout. Pola Stout was an influential textile designer after her second marriage. She was executor of Rex Stout's literary estate after her husband's death in 1975.

== Biography ==
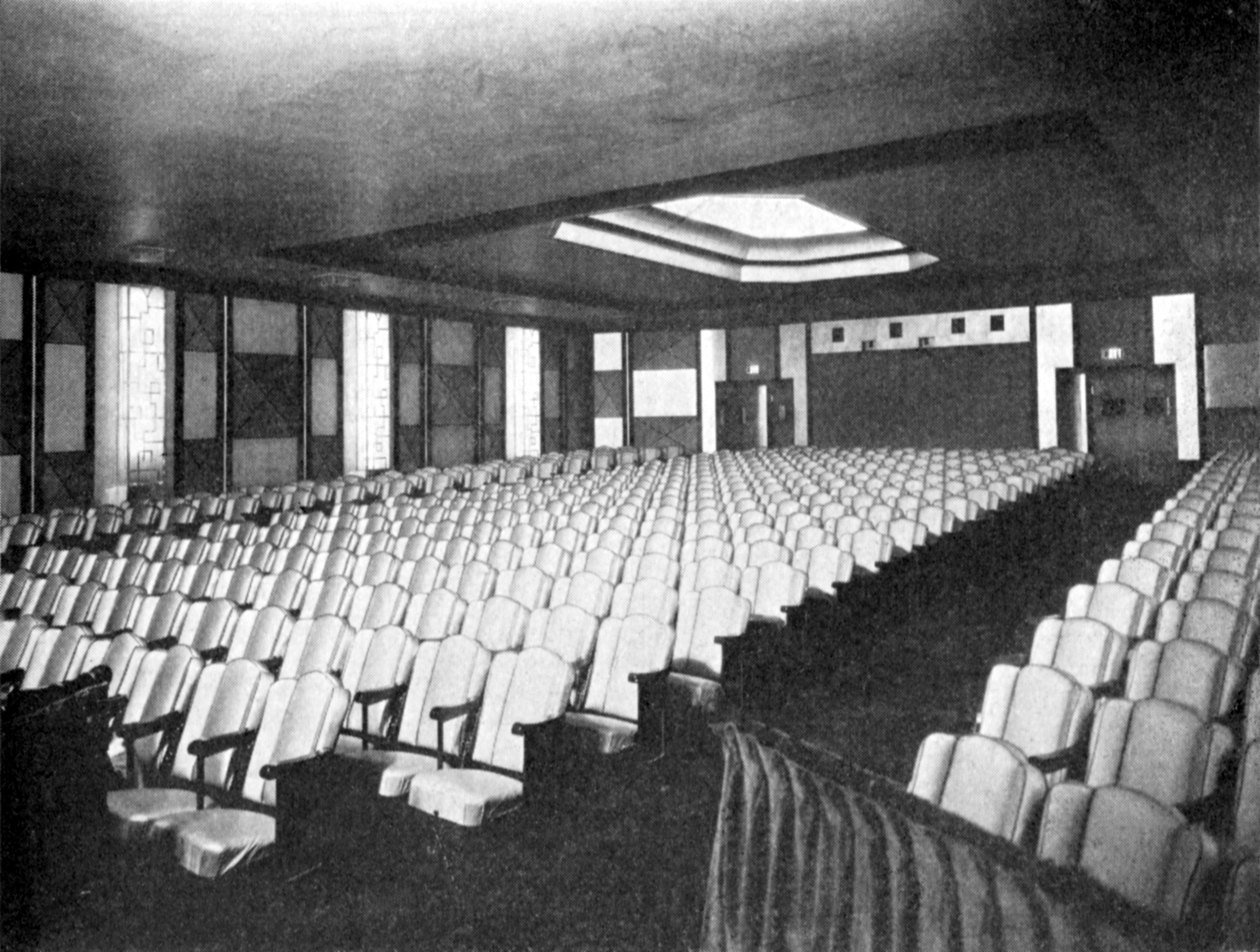
Auditorium of the Little Carnegie Playhouse by Wolfgang and Pola Hoffmann, architects (1928)

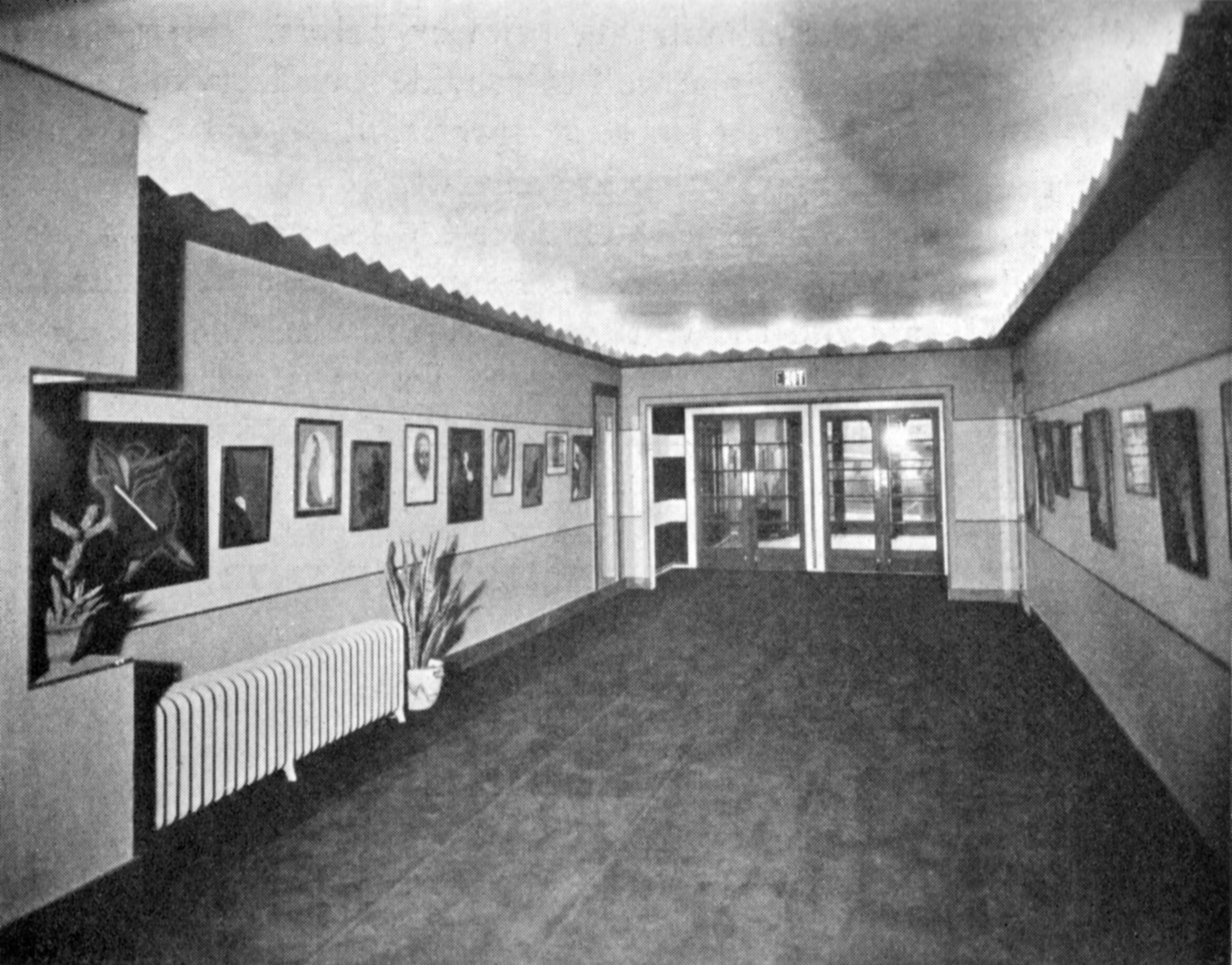
Art gallery in the Little Carnegie Playhouse (1928)

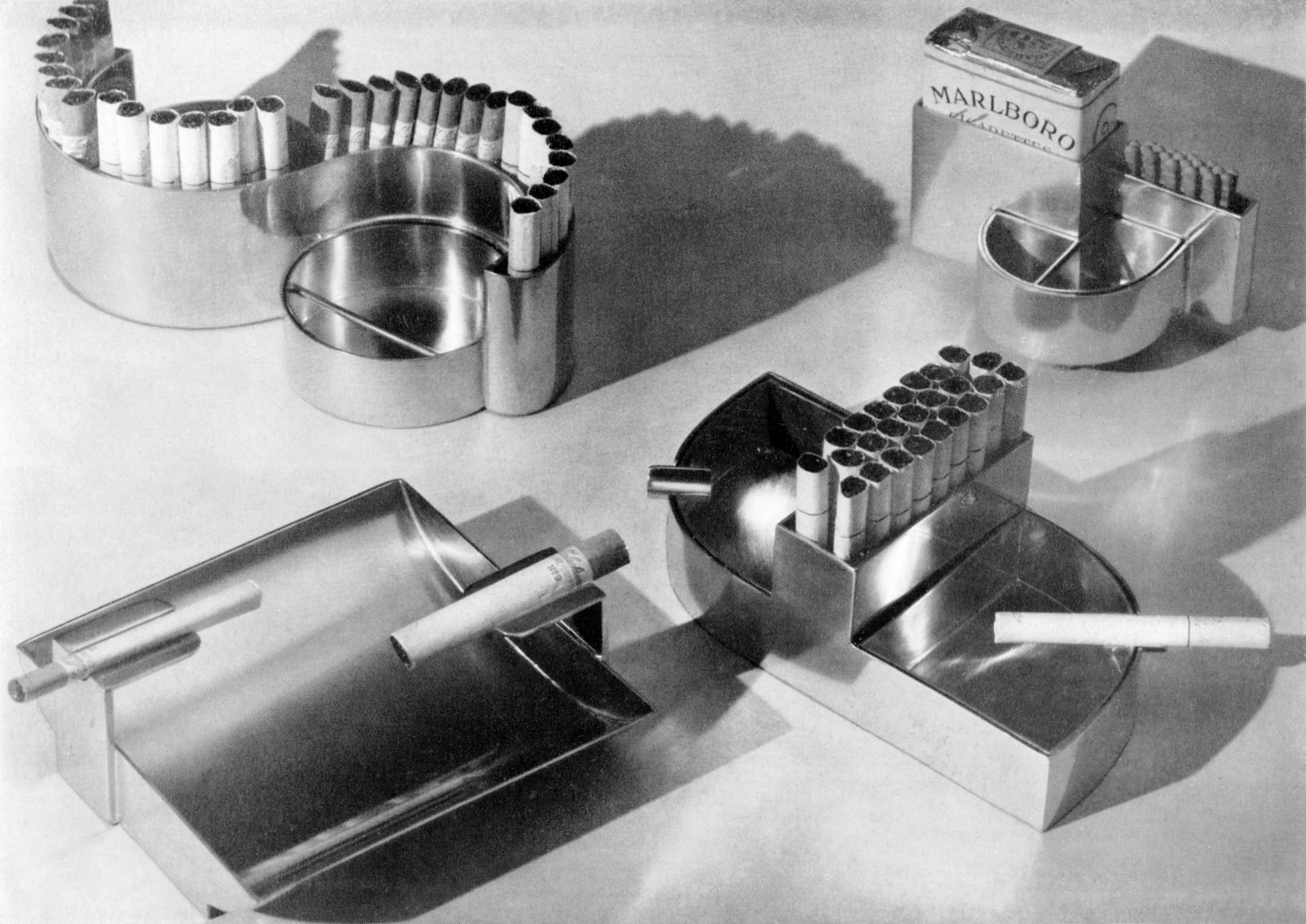
Light pewter cigarette and ash trays by Wolfgang and Pola Hoffmann (1930)

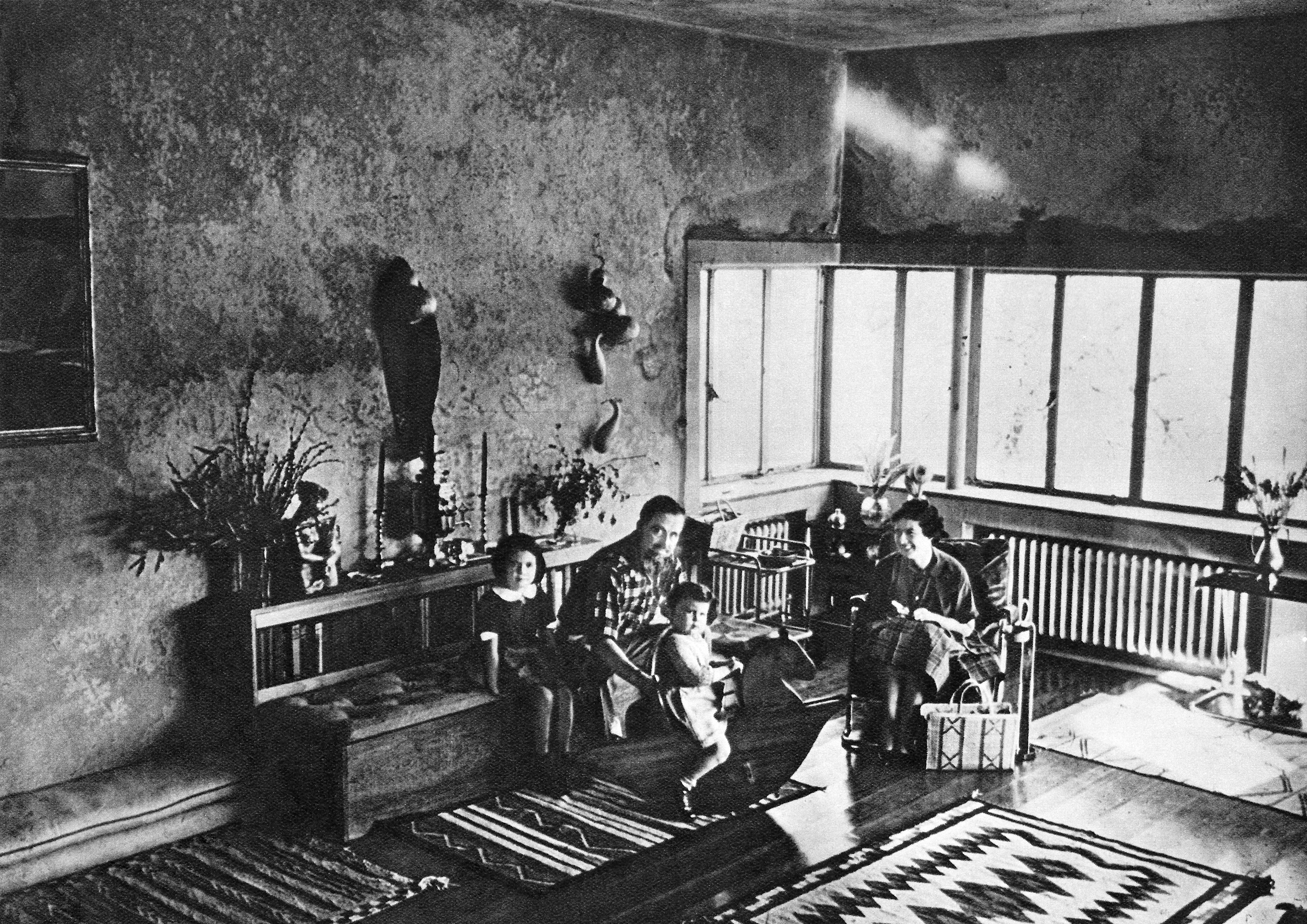
Stout family at High Meadow (1940)

Pola Stout was born Josefine Pola Weinbach, daughter of Schulem and Betty Eliasiewicz (Tune) Weinbach, (Note: Pola's parents were murdered at Auschwitz concentration camp during World War II, despite efforts by her politically connected husband Rex Stout to facilitate their escape to the United States.) on January 8, 1902. She was born in Stryj, a city that was then part of Austria-Hungary and was later part of Poland. As a child she befriended dressmakers and used the scraps from their cutting tables to fashion clothing for her dolls, which she displayed in a window facing the street. She was unable to persuade her parents to let her pursue a career in art; instead, she was sent to the University of Lemberg to study philosophy. In addition to her coursework there she worked for a milliner, and saved enough money to run away to Vienna. On the day of her arrival she arranged to study at the Kunstgewerbe Schule (now the University of Applied Arts Vienna) with Josef Hoffmann. To save money for tuition, she slept on a park bench for her first six weeks in the Austrian capital.

During her four years of study at the Kunstgewerbe Schule, Pola Weinbach designed textiles for the Wiener Werkstätte and worked for Sigmund Freud, repairing a Gobelin tapestry. She then lived in Paris, working at a fabric house that supplied haute couture, and then moved to Berlin. On December 28, 1925, she married Wolfgang Hoffmann, Josef Hoffmann's son, who was on his way to New York to work as an assistant to architect-designer Joseph Urban. The couple immigrated to the United States, and after nine months with Urban they formed their own independent design partnership with offices on Madison Avenue in Manhattan. Their first years in America were difficult; Wolfgang worked in a machine shop, and Pola made lampshades and women's hats.

Commissions began with two art house cinemas in New York—the St. George Playhouse in Brooklyn (1927) and the Little Carnegie Playhouse in Manhattan (1928). Located only a few steps east of Carnegie Hall, the Little Carnegie was an intimate modernist theater in contrast to the opulent movie palaces then in vogue. In addition to the main auditorium, the unique layout included an art gallery, bridge room, ping-pong room and a lounge and dance floor. Demolished in 1982, the venue was prized by sophisticated New Yorkers for its austere silver-and-black interior and its dedication to international film.

Less known today than some of their industrial design colleagues who were more adept at self-promotion, Wolfgang and Pola Hoffmann were among the immigrants who made significant contributions to the development of American modernism and the American Modern design aesthetic in the early 20th century. In 1928 they were among the 14 architects and designers who founded the American Designers' Gallery—"devoted exclusively to showing objects and interiors for practical use"—and they were among those who established the American Union of Decorative Artists and Craftsmen (AUDAC), the most ambitious professional design group of the era. In 1930, AUDAC exhibited furnishings and decorative arts at the Grand Central Palace in five model rooms, one designed by the Hoffmanns. In 1931 they contributed an office interior to a large and important exhibition by AUDAC members, organized by Wolfgang Hoffmann and Kem Weber at the Brooklyn Museum.

The Hoffmanns often made opportunities to exhibit their work, and created contemporary American furnishings and interiors for shops, restaurants, and private clients including Mrs. Otto C. Sommerich and Helena Rubinstein. Pola Hoffmann's interior design commissions included the New York apartment of Charles J. Liebman and the still-extant Weiler Building (1928) at 407 South Warren Street, Syracuse, New York. The Madison Avenue shop of Rena Rosenthal carried their line of accessories—pewter cigarette holders and ashtrays, and desk sets in natural woods and pewter—which was praised by The New Yorker: "These pleasant utilitarian features are totally unadorned; their line and proportion, both of which are a joy to behold, are all they have by way of ornamentation, and it's plenty."

"It would indeed be progress, if through mass production there would be an output of commodities that bore a simple directness of design," Pola Hoffmann said in a 1931 interview. "By choosing only those things that are simple, we derive greater satisfaction from them—we do not tire of them so quickly. … Only those furnishings should be purchased that we feel are necessary, that serve a utilitarian purpose. The more simple and practical the furniture and accessories, the less work is required to keep them clean. This is equally true for clothes."

In late 1931, writer Lewis Gannett and his wife Ruth (previously married to designer Egmont Arens) took Wolfgang and Pola Hoffmann with them when they visited author Rex Stout, who was building a modernist concrete-and-steel house of his own design on a hill between Brewster, New York, and Danbury, Connecticut. The marriages of the Stouts and the Hoffmanns were troubled, and both ended the following year. Pola Hoffmann and Rex Stout were married on December 21, 1932, in a civil ceremony at his home, High Meadow. She became a naturalized citizen of the U.S. in 1936.

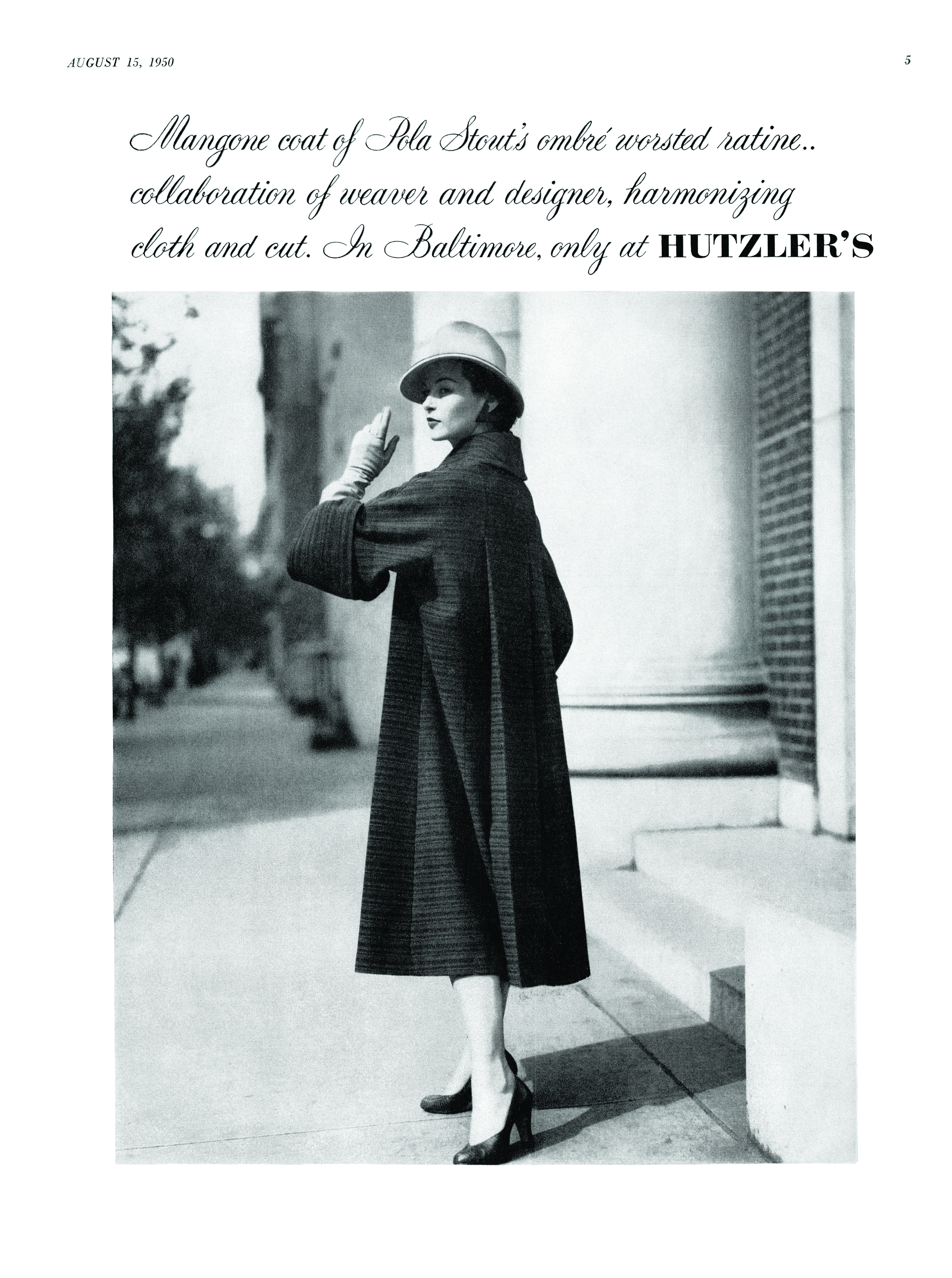
Vogue advertisement for a Philip Mangone coat created from Pola Stout ombré worsted ratine (1950)

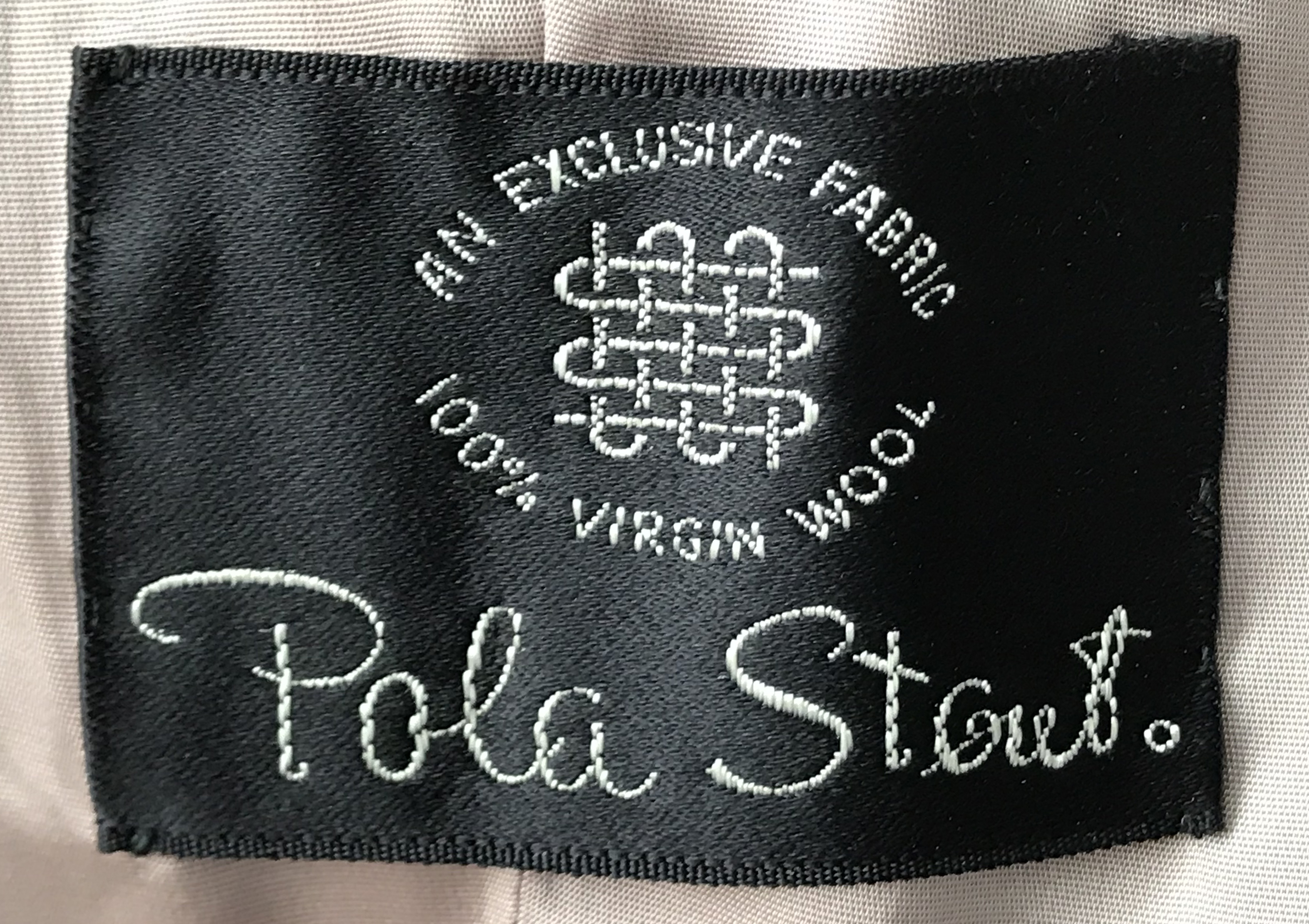
Pola Stout fabric label

After her second marriage Pola Stout was an influential textile designer, one of a select group that pioneered a craft weaving revival in the 1930s. Her large, light-filled workroom was in the east wing of the second floor of High Meadow. She had two daughters and a harmonious, productive household with Rex Stout. The New York Times noted that "while she is spinning yarns in one wing of their hill-top farmhouse, he is spinning his yarns about Nero Wolfe in another."

High Meadow Loom supplied the top fashion houses in New York City and created collections for Dunhill and Otterburn in Great Britain. Although Stout had begun her textile design career by creating hand-loomed fabrics for special garments and individual patrons, she found the greatest satisfaction in planning designs that were executed on power looms.

From 1940 to 1945 Stout was head of a division within Botany Worsted Mills called Pola Stout Fabrics; she was the first woman to receive such an opportunity in the American woolen industry. In 1946 she incorporated, with offices in New York City. Underwritten by eight manufacturers, she leased space in Philadelphia for a textile mill of her own that she operated from 1946 to 1954. In 1948, Pola Stout Inc. employed a staff of 17 weavers and produced 2,000 yards of fine fabric per week. She later created collections for J. P. Stevens & Company (1958–59) and was a designer-consultant for the Ames Textile Corporation. "Mass production methods in the American clothing industry make it possible for everyone to dress fashionably and attractively," she said. "My own feeling is that mass taste is potentially more stable than the taste of people who love fashion for its own sake—and can afford it. The average woman, I have found, is honest, simple, and unassuming in her taste, and I feel it is the responsibility of the designer to take more interest in her basic needs."

Stout designed correlated woolens in three different weights, with colors and patterns that matched or pleasantly contrasted. Each piece in a wardrobe could be worn with another: a suit purchased one year would harmonize with a coat purchased the next season, and with a dress or jacket purchased the next. Based on quality, beauty, durability and classic styling, the simple plan built an enduring wardrobe that expressed the owner's personality. Pola Stout fabrics were sold by the yard in fine stores including B. Altman and Company, which in 1942 created a new department devoted exclusively to Stout's line of Botany Perennials. In that collection and its successor, Botany Annuals, Stout applied the scientific discipline of the Ostwald color system to her own similar system.

"Her exquisitely beautiful woolens are a thrilling sight," wrote the Chicago Tribune. "She weaves with the skill of a composer of symphonies, with the imagination of an artist trying to capture a misty blue morning haze, and with the integrity of a completely honest person. All are reflected in her incomparable fabrics, the very breath of the American scene and way of life. … Her soft tones in checks or the bold stripes and plaids are what make American clothes the tops of any in the world."

Stout created fabric collections for name designers including Elizabeth Hawes, Muriel King, Mainbocher, Jo Copeland, Christian Dior, Edith Head, Norman Norell, Clare Potter, Edward Molyneux, Valentina, Philip Mangone, Vincent Monte-Sano, Pauline Trigère, Zuckerman & Kraus and Irene. She often worked with Adrian, in a famous collaboration that began in the 1940s.

Aline Fruhauf's 1941 caricature portrait of Pola Stout is part of the National Portrait Gallery collection at the Smithsonian Institution in Washington, D.C.

"In his quest to use unique textiles," wrote the Metropolitan Museum of Art, "Adrian frequently incorporated those of designer Pola Stout, whose fabrics often featured blocks and stripes of color. Adrian found Stout's geometric patterns well-suited to his pieced garments where he employed a favorite technique of manipulating striped fabrics to make them serve a dual purpose, as structure and as ornament." Stout also created a collection of sheer wools, some in subtle dark plaids and harlequin diamonds, that Adrian used for menswear.

After visiting Hyde Park in 1940, Stout had a navy-and-ivory plaid woolen shirt made for President Franklin D. Roosevelt, who wore it during the war. In July 1949, Eleanor Roosevelt interviewed Stout on her radio program. That autumn and on later occasions, Stout sent the former First Lady a collection of fabrics she designed and wove especially for her, with suggestions for her dressmaker.

In 1957, Bennington College presented the first comprehensive exhibit of Stout's textiles—a selection of hand-loomed fabrics, power-loomed fabrics made in her Philadelphia mill and in Great Britain, examples of yarns, portfolios of coordinated fabrics, and photographs of clothing made from Pola Stout textiles by noted American designers. In remarks prepared for the opening of the exhibit, art historian Alexander Dorner introduced Stout as one of the most important pioneers in the field of applied arts.

Other solo exhibitions of Stout's work were presented at the Philadelphia Museum College of Art and at the Fashion Institute of Technology, where Stout was an acting lecturer and consultant.

Stout was executor of Rex Stout's literary estate after her husband's death in October 1975. In her later years she partially completed a major project, composing a collection of 50 plaids, one for each of the United States. By 1981 she had moved from High Meadow to Stamford, Connecticut. She died October 12, 1984, aged 82, following a heart attack.

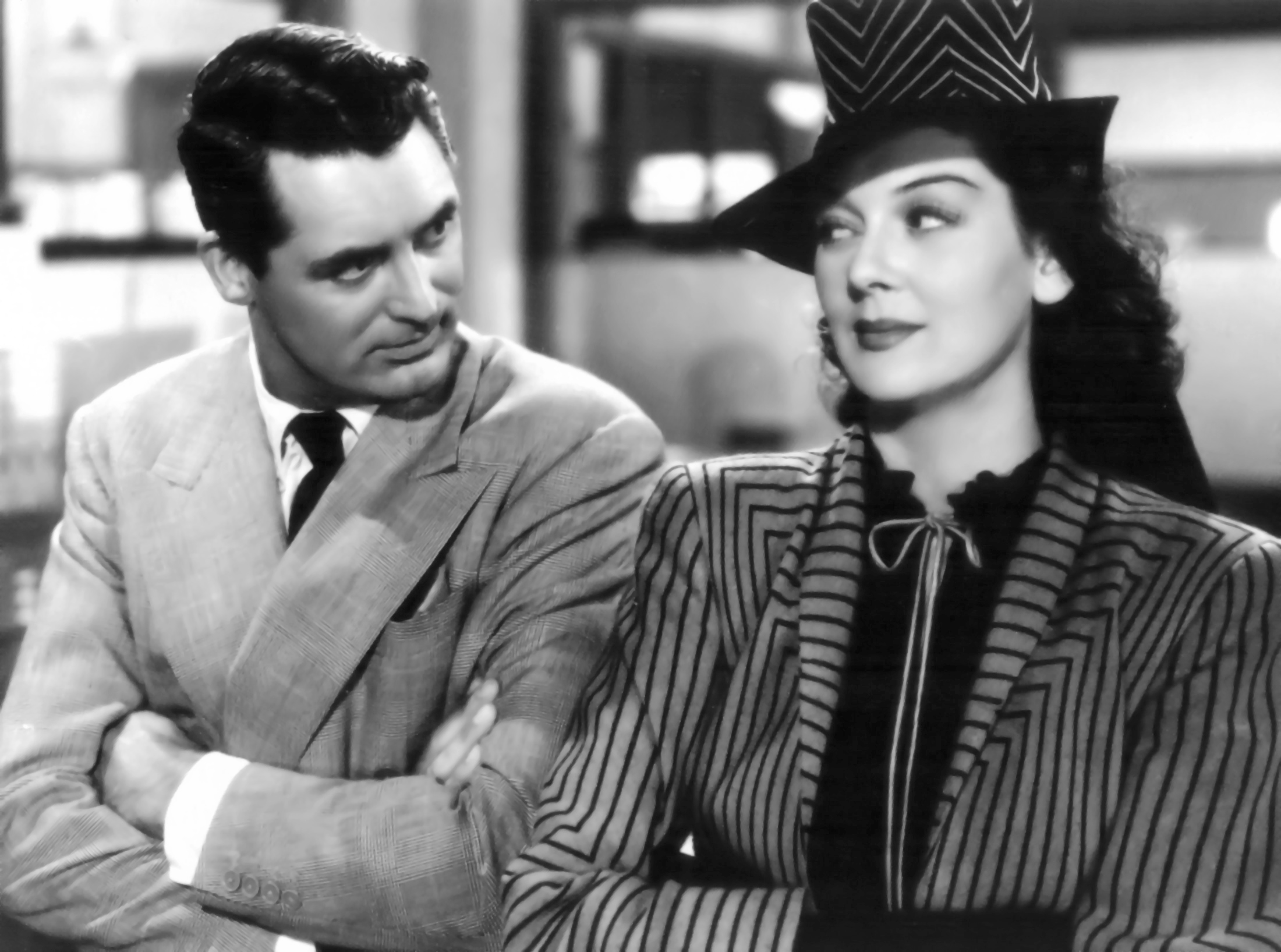
Costume designers used Pola Stout's distinctive textiles for films including His Girl Friday (Rosalind Russell, right) and Laura.

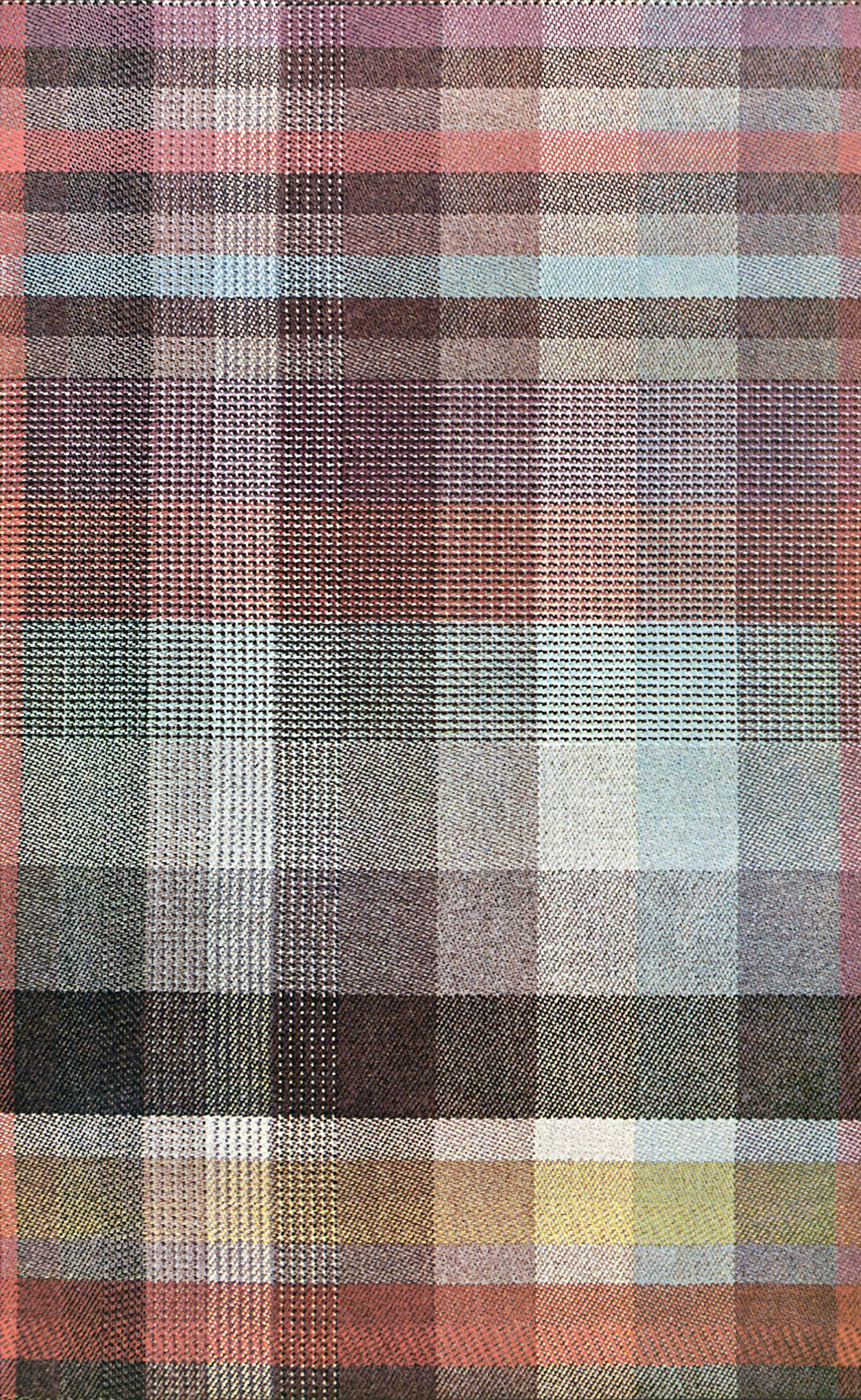
Pola Stout designer's composition "blanket" for a power-loomed design exhibited in Fabrics International (1961–62), sponsored by the Museum of Contemporary Crafts and the Philadelphia Museum College of Art

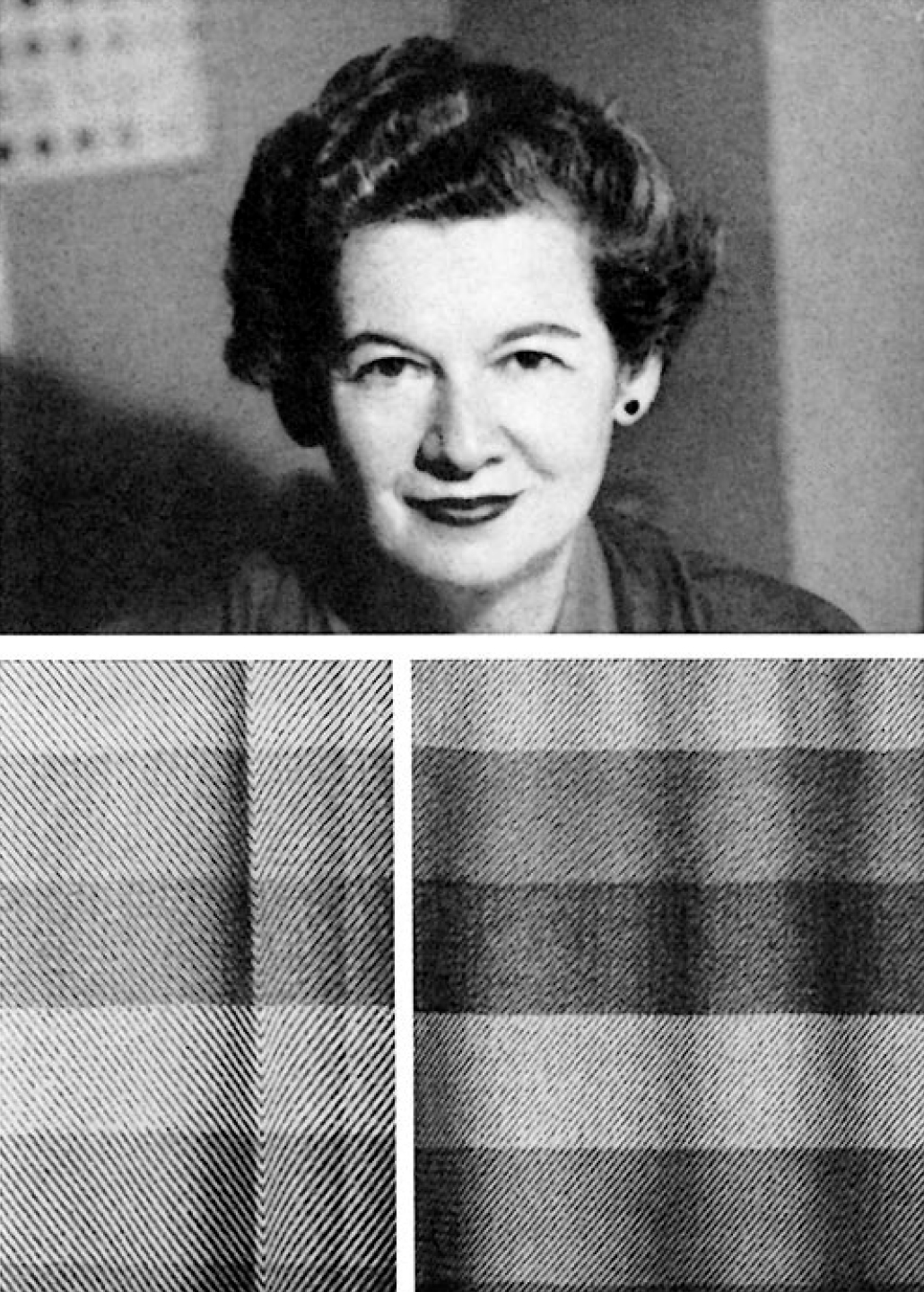
Pola Stout and details of two wool fabrics—a two-ply warp and filling (left) that gives three different diagonal twills, and (right) a single-ply construction

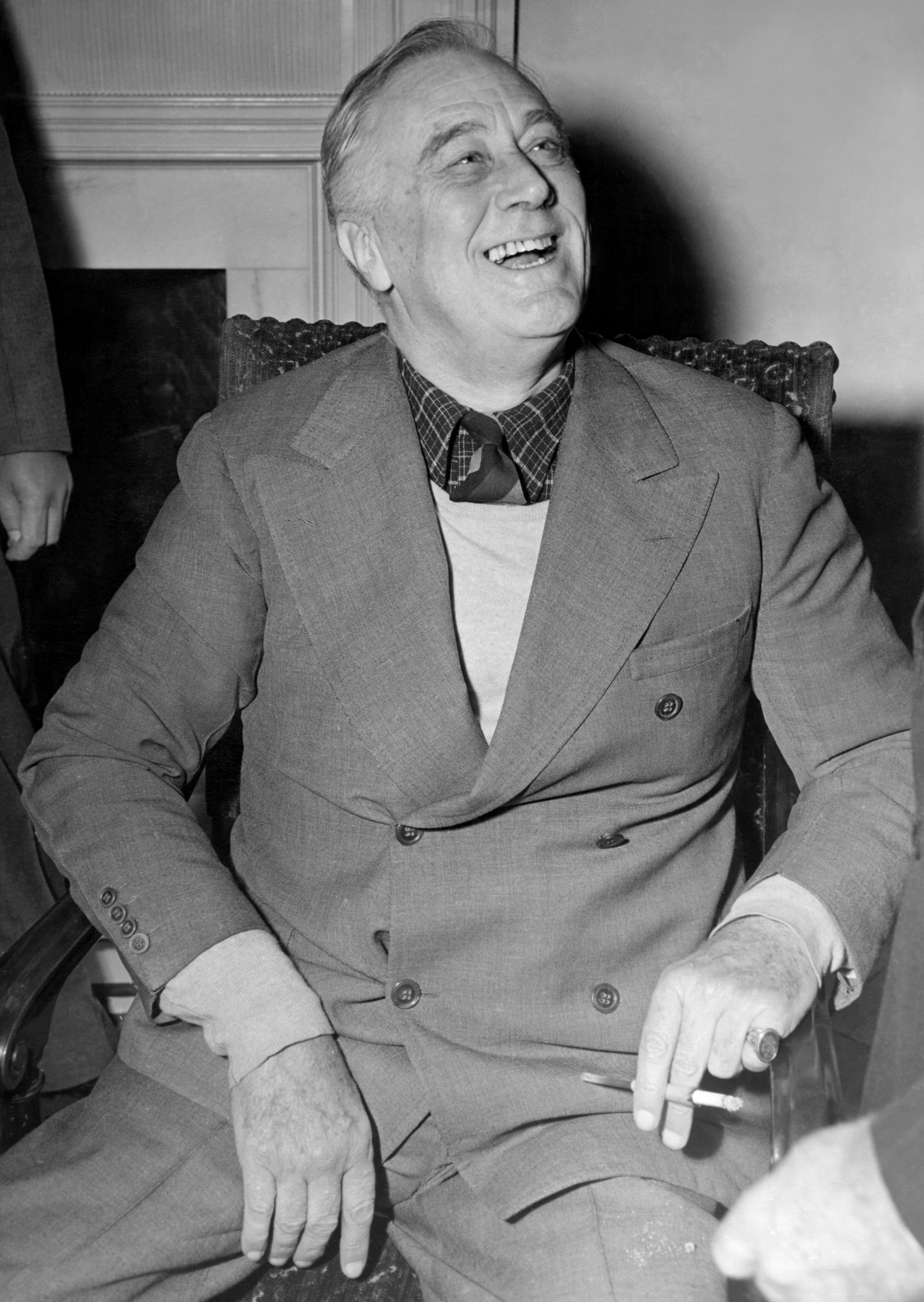
Franklin D. Roosevelt wore a plaid woolen shirt given to him by Pola Stout when he returned to the White House December 17, 1943, after a five-week expedition to North Africa and the Middle East.

== Exhibitions ==
Date	Exhibition	Venue	Notes
1928	Hand-Hooked Rugs Designed by Contemporary American Artists	Art Center, 65–67 East 56th Street, New York City	Group exhibition of rugs designed by Thomas Hart Benton, George Biddle, Hugo Gellert, Pola Hoffmann, Ilonka Karasz, Henry Varnum Poor, John Storrs, Mary Tannahill, Buk Ulreich and others, fabricated by the New Age Association in the Blue Ridge Mountains of North Carolina
1928	Showcase exhibition	American Designers' Gallery, Chase Bank Building lobby, 145 West 57th Street, New York City	Exhibition by 14 member artists including Lucian Bernhard, Donald Deskey, Wolfgang and Pola Hoffmann, Raymond Hood, Ely Jacques Kahn, Henry Varnum Poor, Winold Reiss and Joseph Urban
1929	International Exhibition of Contemporary Glass and Rugs	Metropolitan Museum of Art	Traveling group exhibition by the American Federation of Artists, including one rug designed by Pola Hoffmann
1929	Showcase exhibition	American Designers' Gallery	Group exhibition including a dining alcove designed by Wolfgang and Pola Hoffmann, and other interiors by Donald Deskey, Ilonka Karasz, Henry Varnum Poor, Winhold Reiss, Herman Rosse and Joseph Urban
1930	12th Annual Home Show	Grand Central Palace	Includes five model rooms designed by five members of American Union of Decorative Artists and Craftsmen—Donald Deskey, Willis S. Harrison, Frederick J. Kiesler, Wolfgang and Pola Hoffmann, and Alexander Kachinsky
1931	Modern Industrial and Decorative Arts	Brooklyn Museum	AUDAC exhibition of textiles, furnishings, typography and book design organized by Wolfgang Hoffmann and Kem Weber; Series of room settings including Wolfgang and Pola Hoffmann's 1929 dining alcove and an office interior, as well as work by some 70 contributors including Egmont Arens, Anton Bruhl, Donald Deskey, Paul Frankl, Hugo Gnam, Willis S. Harrison, Gustav Jensen, Alexander Kachinsky, Mariska Karasz, Eric Magnussen, Henriette Reiss, Ruth Reeves, Gilbert Rohde, Eugene Schoen, Lee Simonson, Buk Ulreich, Kem Weber, Vally Wieselthier, Rockwell Kent, Frank Lloyd Wright, Norman Bel Geddes, Hugh Ferris, Walter Dorwin Teague and Russel Wright
1939	Decorative Arts	Golden Gate International Exposition	Group exhibition including wool drapery fabric by Pola Stout
1948–1949	American Textiles '48	Metropolitan Museum of Art	Group exhibition including three fabrics by Pola Stout
1951	Handcrafts in Correlated Fashions	America House, 32 East 52nd Street, New York City	Group exhibition including two suits designed by Adrian from Pola Stout fabrics
1956	Textiles USA	Museum of Modern Art	Juried national exhibition including Pola Stout's Designer's Blanket (1951), an all-worsted rainbow-colored twill weave
1957	Pola Stout	Bennington College	First comprehensive solo exhibit of textiles by Pola Stout
1958	Fabric Designs by Pola Stout	Philadelphia Museum College of Art	Solo exhibition
1958–1960	Fibers, Tools and Weaves	Traveling	American Craftsmen's Council group exhibition
1960	The Logic and Magic of Color	Cooper Hewitt Museum	Group exhibition including Pola Stout's Weaver's Blanket, made for J. P. Stevens & Company
1961–1962	Apparel Fabrics by Pola Stout	Fashion Institute of Technology	One-year solo exhibition
1961–1962	Fabrics International	Traveling	Group exhibition co-sponsored by Museum of Contemporary Crafts and the Philadelphia Museum College of Art
1963	Woven Compositions	Carnegie Institute of Technology	Solo exhibit
2000	Fashion Lives, Fashion Lives	Goldstein Museum of Design, University of Minnesota	Retrospective featuring Pola Stout, Adrian, Charles James and Jeanne Auerbacher

== Cultural references ==
Pola Stout is regarded as the prototype for several women of integrity and purpose in Rex Stout's Nero Wolfe corpus. Her place in the textile and fashion industry furnished background and plot for such stories as The Red Box (1937), Red Threads (1939), and "Frame-Up for Murder" (1958). Direct references to Pola Stout Inc. appear in the 1949 novel, The Second Confession (chapter 6), in which Madeline Sperling wears "a soft but smooth wool dress of browns and blacks that looked like a PSI fabric", and in the 1969 novel Death of a Dude (Chapter 3) in which Archie Goodwin "rinsed off and changed to a PSI shirt and brown woolen slacks".
