= The Heavenly Tenants =

1946 children's book by William Maxwell

- First edition
- Author: William Maxwell
- Illustrator: Ilonka Karasz
- Language: English
- Genre: Children's literature
- Publisher: Harper
- Publication date: September 11, 1946
- Publication place: United States

The Heavenly Tenants is a 1945 children's fantasy novel written by William Maxwell and illustrated by Ilonka Karasz. When the Marvell family departs for a vacation in Virginia, they leave their Wisconsin farm under the care of Old August. While the family is away, Old August is sick and unable to perform his duty, and the signs of the zodiac descend to take care of the farm. In Virginia, Mr. Marvell notices he cannot see any constellations in the sky. When the family returns home, they notice the farm has been taken care of while they were away, and Mr. Marvell notices the constellations have returned to the sky.

The story earned a Newbery Honor in 1947, coming in fourth in voting. 17 called it a "sensitive, philosophical tale full of little touches which make it live".
