= Free Baseball =

- Author: Sue Corbett
- Language: English
- Publication date: 2006

Free Baseball is a children's novel by Sue Corbett, first published in 2006.

== Plot summary ==
Felix is a Cuban boy who came to the USA with his mother when he was three years old. He has a passion for baseball and wins two tickets to a minor-league baseball game via a radio competition. Going to the game with his babysitter, they become separated when Felix learns that the opposing team has a Cuban player, believing that he might be able to share information about Felix's father, a famous baseball player on the Cuban national team who stayed behind when Felix and his mother emigrated.

== Development ==
Corbett had the idea for the book after an incident at a baseball game when she became separated from her daughter Karina and was able to find her as all of the children were wearing the cok (the team name) team shirts.

== Reception ==
School Library Journal described the novel as an "engaging, well-written story with a satisfying ending." The Topeka Capital-Journal called it a "wonderful mix of self-discovery and baseball." Kids Reads thought that Felix was a "richly drawn character".

== Awards and nominations ==
- 2006 Selected by the Junior Library Guild
- 2008 Nominated for the Young Hoosier Book Award
- 2008 Nominated for the Virginia Readers Choice Award
- 2009 Nominated for the Nutmeg Book Award (final results not yet announced)
