= All Aboard, We Are Off =

1944 children picture book

- First edition
- Author: Nura
- Illustrator: Nura
- Genre: Picture book
- Published: 1944 (The Studio Publications, Inc.)
- Publication place: United States
- Pages: 39
- OCLC: 6654071
- LC Class: PZ7.U35 Al

All Aboard, We Are Off is a children's picture book written and illustrated by Nura – the American artist Nura Woodson Ulreich. It was published by the Junior Literary Guild in 1944, and its copyright was renewed in 1971.

The book is about a woman who sells apples to young boys and girls every day before and after school. She takes the children on a trip to lands which have never been mapped, to teach them about the importance of moderation in life. Destinations include the "Land of Play," the "Land of Food and Drink," the "Land of Sleep," among other similar places.
