= Hugo Robus =

American sculptor

- Born: 1885; Cleveland, Ohio, U.S.
- Died: January 14, 1964 (aged 78–79); Ramapo, New York, U.S.
- Education: Cleveland School of Art; National Academy of Design; Académie de la Grande Chaumière
- Occupation: Sculptor

Hugo Robus (1885 – January 14, 1964) was an American sculptor. He co-founded an art colony in New City, New York. His sculptures are in the permanent collections of the Whitney Museum of American Art, the Museum of Modern Art, the Metropolitan Museum of Art, and the Smithsonian American Art Museum.

== Early life ==
Robus was born in 1885 in Cleveland, Ohio. He attended the Cleveland School of Art in his hometown, the National Academy of Design in New York City, and the Académie de la Grande Chaumière in Paris.

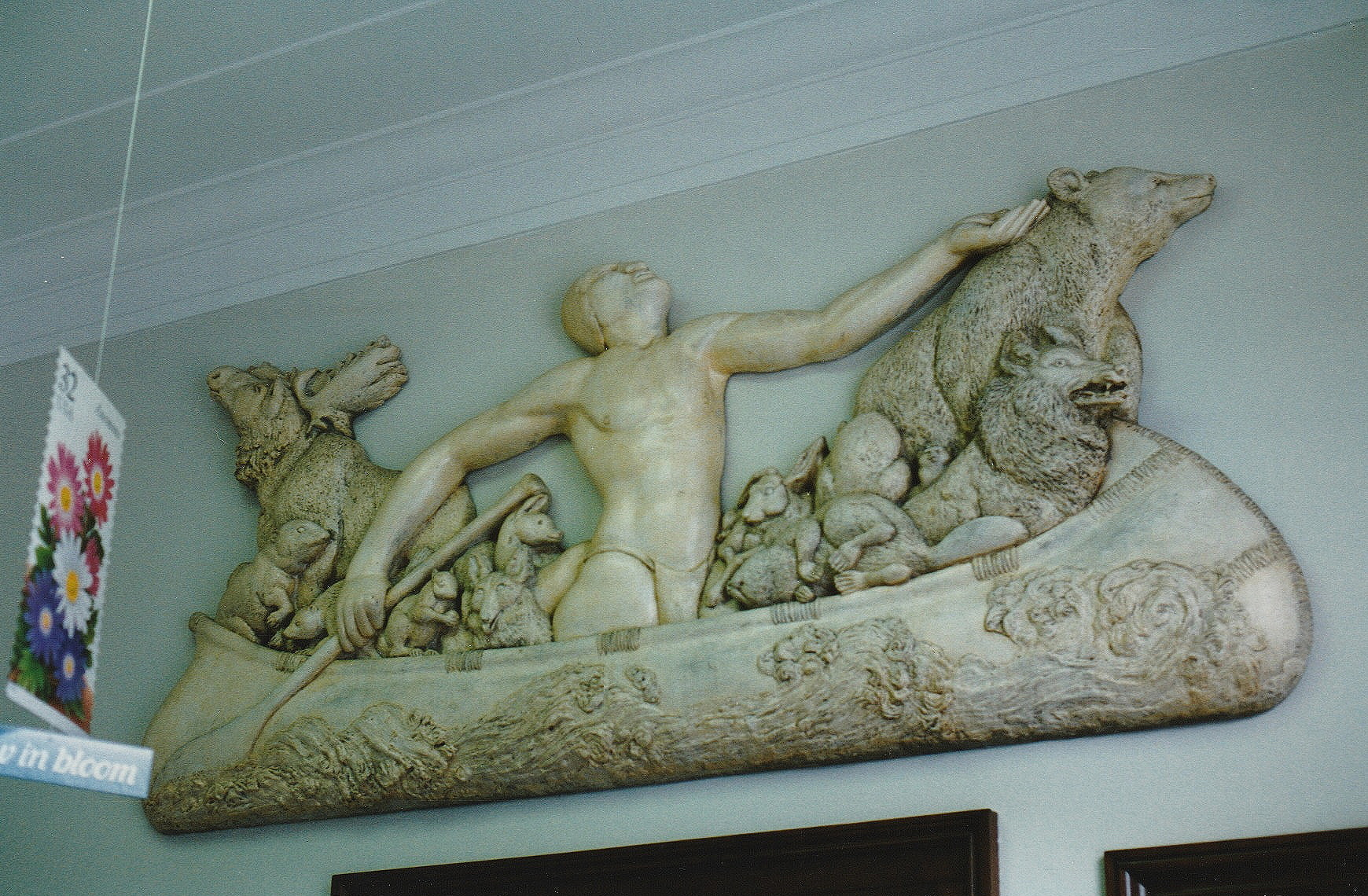
Chippewa Legend (1939), relief sculpture by Robus at the post office in Munising, Michigan

== Career ==
Robus was a painter until the 1920s, when he became a sculptor. He established an art colony in New City, New York with Henry Varnum Poor and Martha Kantor in 1918.

His sculptures were exhibited at the Grand Central Art Galleries in New York City and Corcoran Gallery of Art in Washington, D.C. They later became part of the permanent collections of the Whitney Museum of American Art, the Museum of Modern Art and the Metropolitan Museum of Art in New York City, as well as the Smithsonian American Art Museum in Washington, D.C.

== Personal life and death ==
Robus resided at 567 South Mountain Road in New City, New York. He had a son, Hugo Robus Jr.

Robus died in 1964 at the Ramapo General Hospital in Ramapo, New York, at age 78.
