= Mariska Karasz =

American fashion designer (1898–1960)

- Karasz in 1949
- Born: December 2, 1898; Budapest, Hungary
- Died: August 27, 1960 (aged 61–62); Danbury, Connecticut
- Education: Cooper Union
- Known for: Fashion design, Textile Art, Writing
- Spouse: Donald Peterson

Mariska Karasz (born Mariska Kárász in Budapest, Hungary; December 2, 1898 – August 27, 1960) was a Hungarian-American fashion designer, author, and textile artist. She created colorful, patterned garments largely inspired by the folk art of her native country. Her abstract wall hangings mixed fibers such as silk, cotton, wool, and hemp with horsehair and wood. They garnered her extensive national, and even international, attention. Critics repeatedly praised her skillful and unusual use of color, her creative combinations of materials, and her inspiring efforts to promote a modern approach to embroidery.

== Biography ==
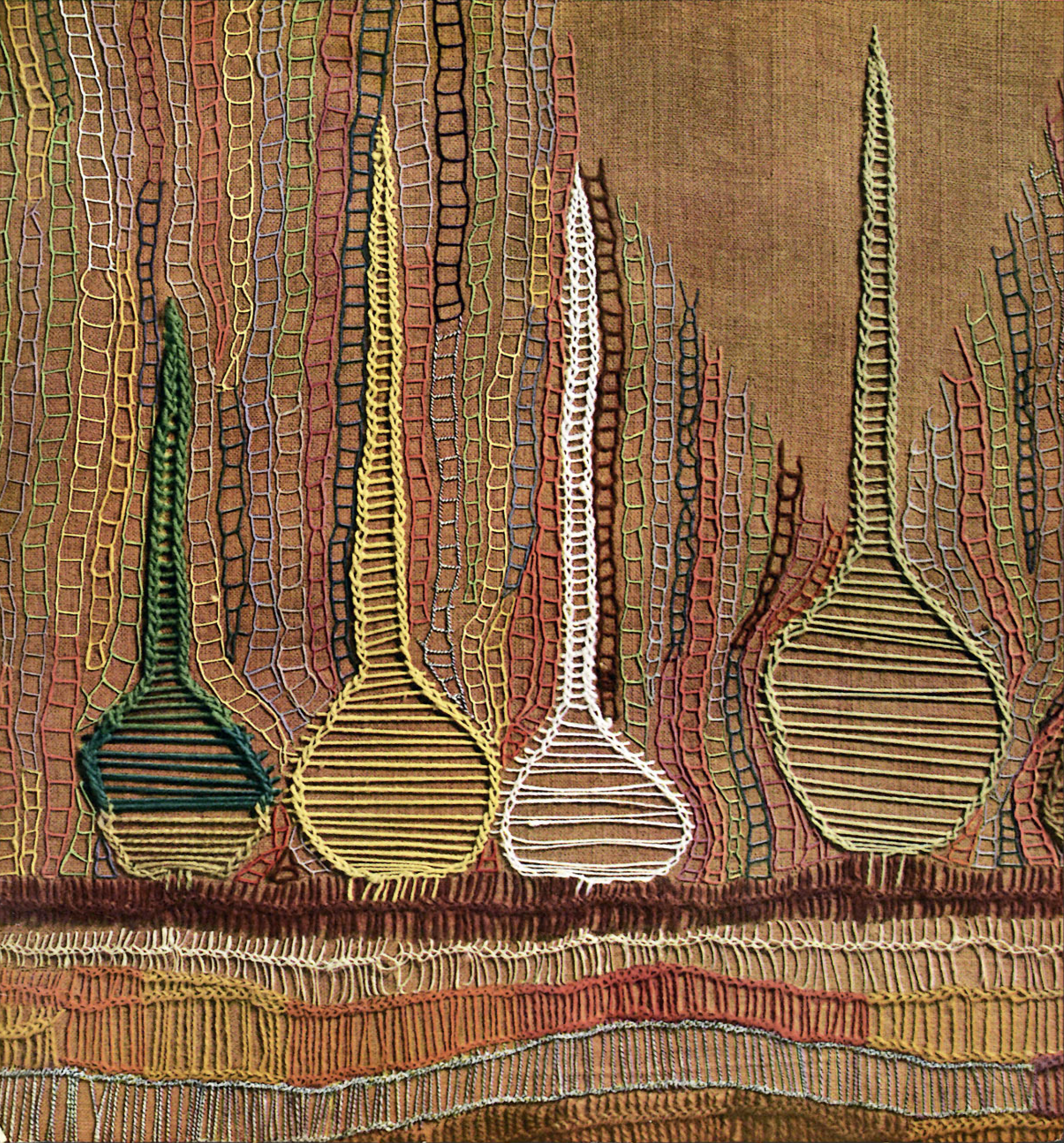
Detail of Alchemy (1953), wall panel executed on silk with yarns from Pola Stout

Karasz learned to sew as a young girl in Hungary. She immigrated to New York City in 1914 at the age of sixteen. Karasz was the younger sister of industrial designer and New Yorker cover artist Ilonka Karasz. She taught herself embroidery, utilizing her family, animals, and the natural world surrounding her other studio in Brewster, New York, as subject matter. As her talent developed, her pieces became increasingly abstract and refined. After studying at Cooper Union Art School under well known designer Ethel Traphagen, she sold some of her handmade blouses in Wanamaker's department store, where it performed so well the store gave Mariska her own department.

Mariska soon established a successful career as a fashion designer, with a studio at 228 Madison Avenue. Her European background and new American identity defined her bespoke clothing she designed for women in the 1920s, which combined Hungarian folk elements with a modern American style. She traveled to Europe annually to see the latest collections of new couture and purchase fabrics, adding to her understanding of international fashion and modern art. During her trips to Europe she would visit with the women in Hungary that worked for her sewing.

Around the year 1927, she designed a cubist coordinated coat and dress of appliqued cream silk on navy silk, which Kai Toussaint Marcel in 2023 credited as the garment that inspired Karl Lagerfeld's suit for Chanel in 2008. She described in a 1929 interview that sometimes, “When there is a modern play in which modern costumes are important, I am asked to design them.”

While on a trip to California in 1928 where she was presenting her designs at several venues in the Los Angeles Area, she met her soon to be husband, Donald Peterson. He was a young naval lieutenant, and they married only a month later. They lived in New York City and often vacationed in Brewster, New York at a family plot given to them by her sister and her husband. After the births of her two daughters, Solveig (1931) and Rosamond (1932) she was quoted as saying she was, “appalled at the belaced and beruffled clothes that were on the market for children.” Karasz began designing modern children's clothing, which was admired by parents, scholars, and critics for its practicality and originality. Her career in fashion transitioned from fashion to textile art in the early 1940s, following a studio fire, her divorce, and the entry of the United States into World War II when she could no longer travel to Europe because of the political and social unrest. She then began journeying to Mexico and Guatemala to find folk needlework.Her textile art incorporated earthy, vibrant, and unexpected colors in abstract expressionism influenced shapes and textures.

After visiting Bolivia for a short time to gather materials and visit a friend, Mariska Karasz died from lung cancer on August 27, 1960 in Danbury, Connecticut at 62 years old. Throughout her life she used colors, textures, and art that conveyed her love of her home country and that of the vibrant American landscape of her new home. Her obituary ran in The New York Times, Handweaver & Craftsman, Interiors, and Craft Horizons. “Her unfailing generosity to craftsmen and laymen interested in needlework,” Craft Horizons wrote about Karasz on a later occasion, contributed to “her eminence as a truly modern needlewoman who attained the rank of artist.”

== Artistic career ==
In 1947, during the rise of American studio craft and abstract expressionism, Karasz began creating embroidered wall hangings. She exhibited her work in museums and galleries across the county, in over 50 solo shows during the 1950s.

She also authored the book Adventures in Stitches in 1949 (republished in an expanded version in 1959), an influential book on creative needlework, and served as guest needlework editor for House Beautiful from 1952 to 1953. Karasz has been frequently left out of contemporary accounts of craft history. Her contributions had mostly been forgotten by the end of the 20th century, a phenomenon common to female artists. The feminist artist's reexamination of embroidery in the 1970s, as demonstrated by Judy Chicago's The Dinner Party, was even unable to address this omission.“Stitchery,” as creative embroidery has come to be called, continues to be of interest to artists and hobbyists. Books such as David B. Van Dommelen’s Decorative Wall Hangings: Art with Fabric (1962), and Jacqueline Enthoven’s The Stitches of Creative Embroidery (1964) pay homage to Karasz’s instrumental role in the medium’s revival.

Mariska Karasz created clothing and art that is represented in the following collections: Art Institute Chicago, Metropolitan Museum of Art, Smithsonian American Art Museum, Baltimore Museum of Art, Cooper Hewitt, Smithsonian Design Museum.

The first retrospective of her work took place at the Georgia Museum of Art from January 20 to April 15, 2007. In 2010 her work was included in the exhibition "Textiles Recycled/Reimagined" at the Baltimore Museum of Art.

At the Crossing Borders Central European Women in the Arts, International Symposium held on the 26th of January 2024, Ashley Callahan presented "Bringing Modernism from Budapest to New York: Sisters Ilonka and Mariska Karasz" a recording of her presentation is available on YouTube.

Her work "Breeze" was included in the exhibit "Subversive, Skilled, Sublime: Fiber Art by Women", held at the Smithsonian American Art Museum and Renwick Gallery, from May 31, 2024 – January 5, 2025.

== Selected Works ==
Title	Medium	Date	Collection	Dimensions	Link
Ensemble	Appliqued silk	ca. 1927	Metropolitan Museum of Art, The Costume Institute		
Zodiac	Embroidered wool with wool, cotton, and hemp fibers	1948	Art Institute Chicago	75 5/8 x 59 in. (192 x 149.9 cm.)	
Fields from the Air	Embroidered linen, wool, and cotton	1950–1953	Cooper Hewitt, Smithsonian Design Museum		
Wall Shadows (Diptych)	Embroidered wool, linen, and cotton	ca. 1955	Smithsonian American Art Museum	62 1/4 x 23 in. (158.1 x 58.4 cm.)	
Breeze	Embroidered linen, plastic, and other fibers	ca. 1958	Smithsonian American Art Museum	53 1/2 x 48 3/8 in. (135.9 x 122.9 cm.)	

== Publications ==
- Karasz, Mariska (1943). See and Sew: A picture book of sewing (First ed.). New York: J.B. Lippincott Company.
- Karasz, Mariska (1946). Design and Sew (First ed.). United States: J.B. Lippincott Company.
- Karasz, Mariska (1949). Adventures in Stitches : a new art of embroidery (First ed.). New York: Funk & Wagnalls Co.
- Callahan, Ashley (2007). Modern Threads: Fashion and Art by Mariska Karasz. Athens, Georgia: Georgia Museum of Art. ISBN 9780915977611.
- Tartsinis, Ann Marguerite (2013). An American Style: Global Sources for New York Textile and Fashion Design, 1915-1928. New York: Yale University Press / Bard Graduate Center ISBN 978-0-300-19943-7.
