= Richardson Silk Mill =

- U.S. National Register of Historic Places
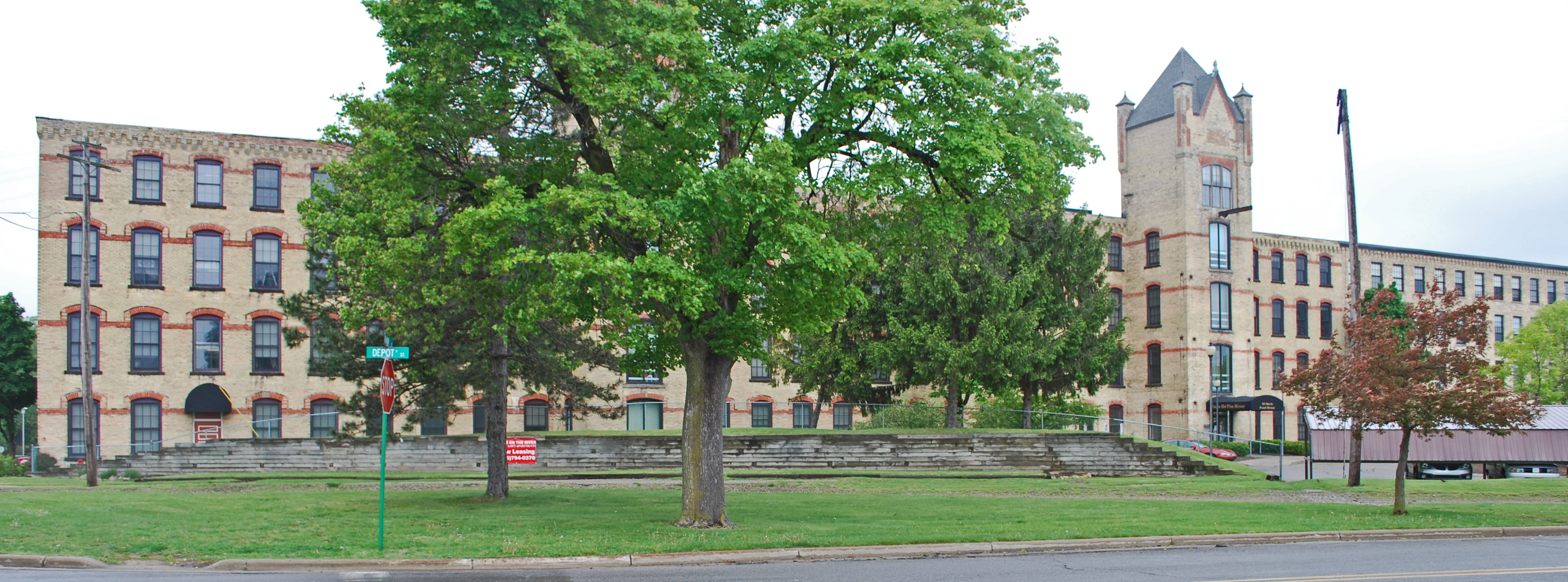

- Location within Michigan Location within the United States
- Interactive map
- Location: 101 Front St., Belding, Michigan
- Coordinates: 43°5′55″N 85°14′2″W
- Area: 2.3 acres (0.93 ha)
- Built: 1886
- NRHP reference No.: 85002496
- Added to NRHP: September 26, 1985

The Richardson Silk Mill is a former industrial building located at 101 Front Street in Belding, Michigan. It was listed on the National Register of Historic Places in 1985. The building has been converted into apartments, now known as the Flats on the River.

== History ==
In 1860, Hiram H. Belding and his brother Alva N. Belding started selling spooled silk from a base in what is now Belding, aided by a third brother, Milo M. Belding, who living in Ashfield, Massachusetts. This retail trade was an immense success, and in 1866 Belding Brothers began manufacturing silk thread in Rockville, Connecticut. By 1872 they had established a second mill in Northampton, Massachusetts, and soon added other facilities in California and Montreal. In 1886, Belding Brothers returned to Belding and constructed this mill, designated Mill #1. However, soon after completing the building, they had doubts about the success of the venture and sold it to George Richardson of Chicago, Illinois, who had previously worked for Belding Brothers as an office manager.

However, despite their doubts, the Richardson Mill was immediately successful. Belding Brothers established a second mill in Belding in 1890, quickly followed by two more. In 1898, Richardson expanded his mill with a substantial addition, and all four mills operated simultaneously for some time. In 1910, Belding Brothers re-purchased the Richardson Mill. They operated it until 1925, when they sold the company to an eastern consortium. The new corporation, Belding-Heminway, continued to operate the Belding mills until 1932, when they were closed. The Richardson Silk Mill was used by a series of manufacturing firms, including the manufacture of down-filled sporting goods in the 1970s.

By the early 1980s, the structure was vacant. In 1986, it was converted into apartments, now known as the Flats on the River.

== Description ==
The Richardson Silk Mill is a four-story building constructed of whitish brick with a slant roof on a concrete foundation. It was constructed in two sections: the 1888 section measures 50 feet by 250 feet, and the 1898 addition measures 50 feet by 100 feet. The original section contains two five-story brick towers with pyramidal slate roofs, and has regularly spaced arched windows with decorative belt courses of red brick running between the windows and forming arches. The addition has a similar window structure, but without the decorative brick. A two-story white brick addition is attached to the rear of the building.
