= Junior Library Guild =

American book club devoted to juvenile literature

Junior Library Guild, formerly the Junior Literary Guild, is a commercial book club devoted to juvenile literature. It was created in 1929 as one of the enterprises of the Literary Guild, an adult book club created in 1927 by Samuel W. Craig and Harold K. Guinzburg. Book clubs often marketed books to libraries as well, and by the 1950s the majority of the Junior Literary Guild's sales were to libraries. In 1988, the name was changed to the Junior Library Guild to reflect this change in the company's business.

The Junior Library Guild is operated by Media Source Inc., which is based in Plain City, Ohio. The editorial department is in New York City.

== Selection of works ==
Selection of a children's book by the editors of the Junior Literary Guild (or latterly the Junior Library Guild) is a distinction used for publicity by publishers and authors of children's books. At present, 492 books are selected each year.

The position of editor-in-chief of the Junior Literary Guild has been held by only a few individuals over the years. Carl Van Doren was the first editor. He was followed by Helen Ferris, who served from August 1929 until 1960. Ferris was a close associate of Eleanor Roosevelt, who served on the editorial board of the Junior Literary Guild from 1929 through her death in 1962. Roosevelt's involvement in the Guild was fairly active; for example, in a My Day column from 1938 she wrote, "One of the stories I thought interesting about these books was the fact related by the postmaster in a mining town — that two miners' families had often gone without food, but had never cancelled their subscriptions to the Junior Literary Guild books". Ann Durell served until 1962, Thérèse Doumenjou served until 1970, and Marjorie Jones served until 1994, which included the transition from the Junior Literary Guild to the Junior Library Guild. Susan Marston is the current editorial director.

=== 2004 selection ===
In 2004 the Junior Library Guild posted a webpage indicating four classics of children's literature that had been Junior Literary Guild selections. They were:

- Make Way for Ducklings, by Robert McCloskey
- Horton Hears a Who!, by Dr. Seuss
- Little House in the Big Woods, by Laura Ingalls Wilder
- From the Mixed-Up Files of Mrs. Basil E. Frankweiler, by E. L. Konigsburg.

Another book published by the Guild was All Aboard We Are Off, Nura (1944).

=== 2006 selection ===
- Free Baseball

== Magazines ==
The Junior Literary Guild published a monthly magazine, Young Wings, from 1929 through 1955.

Media Source Inc. purchased The Horn Book Magazine in 2009, and Library Journal and School Library Journal in 2010.
