= Kem Weber =

American designer and architect (1889–1963)

Karl Emanuel Martin "Kem" Weber (1889–1963) was an American furniture and industrial designer, architect, art director, and teacher who created several iconic designs of the Streamline style.

== Early career ==
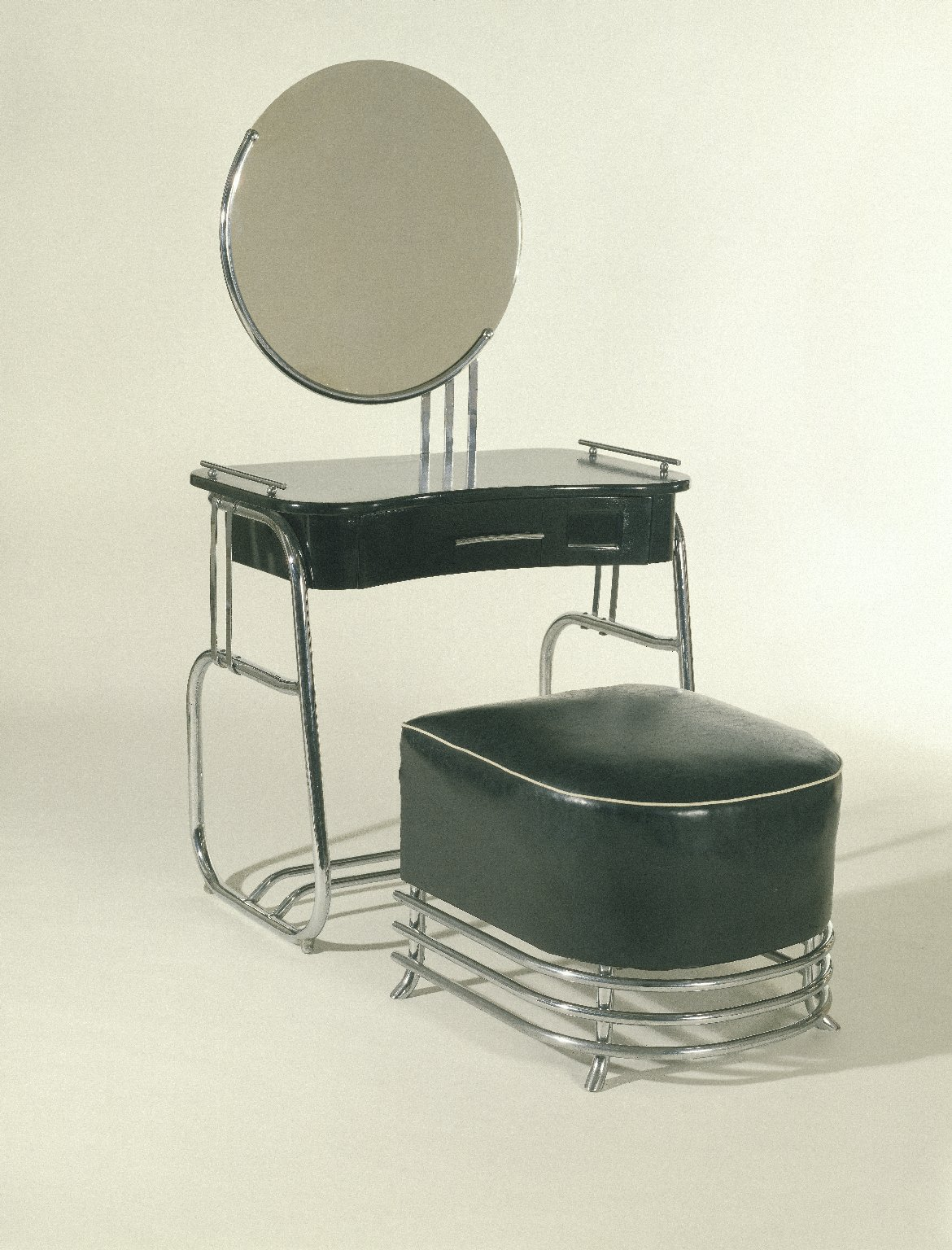
Vanity with Mirror, 1934 Brooklyn Museum

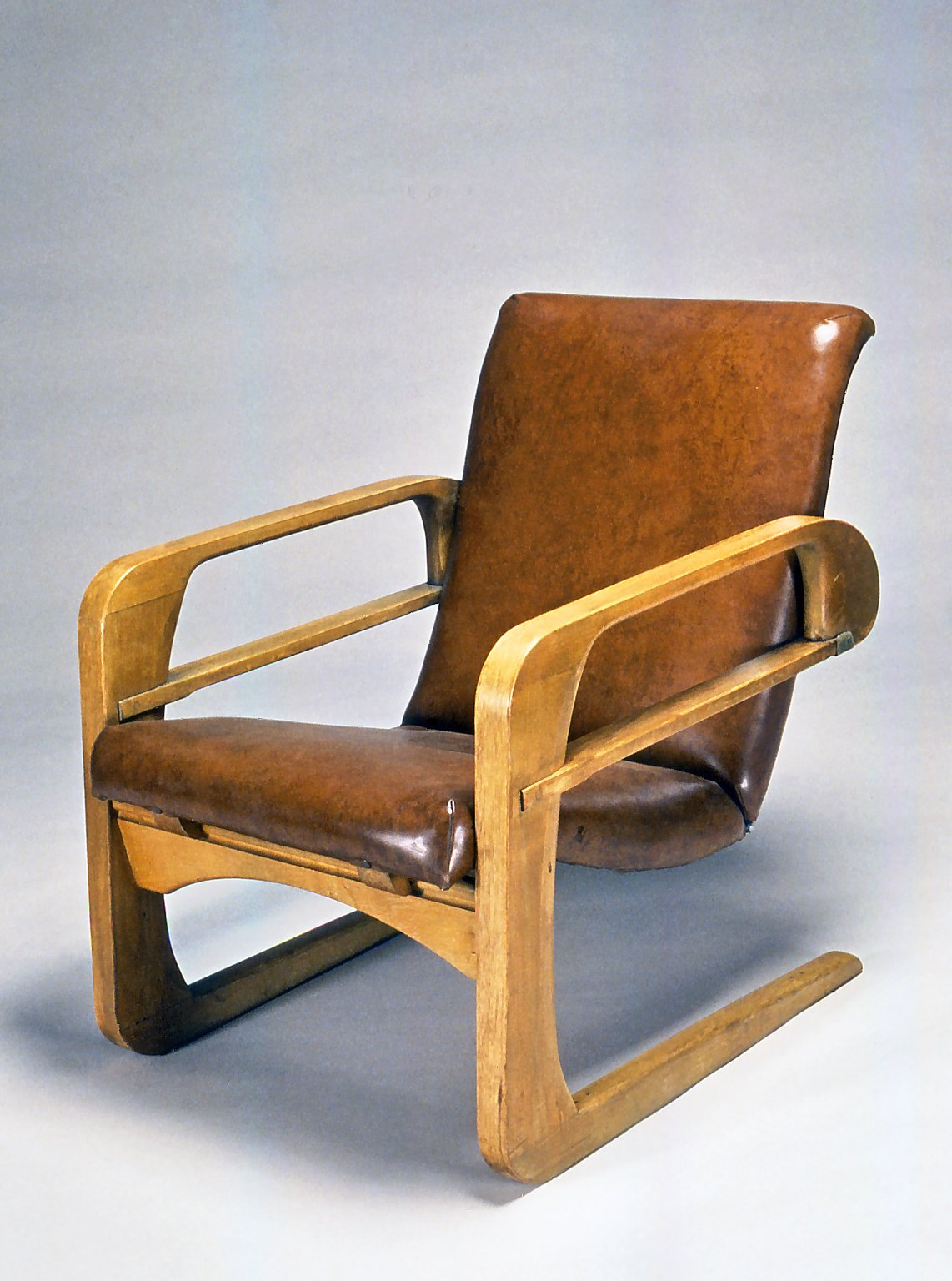
Armchair ("Airline Chair"), 1934–1935 Brooklyn Museum

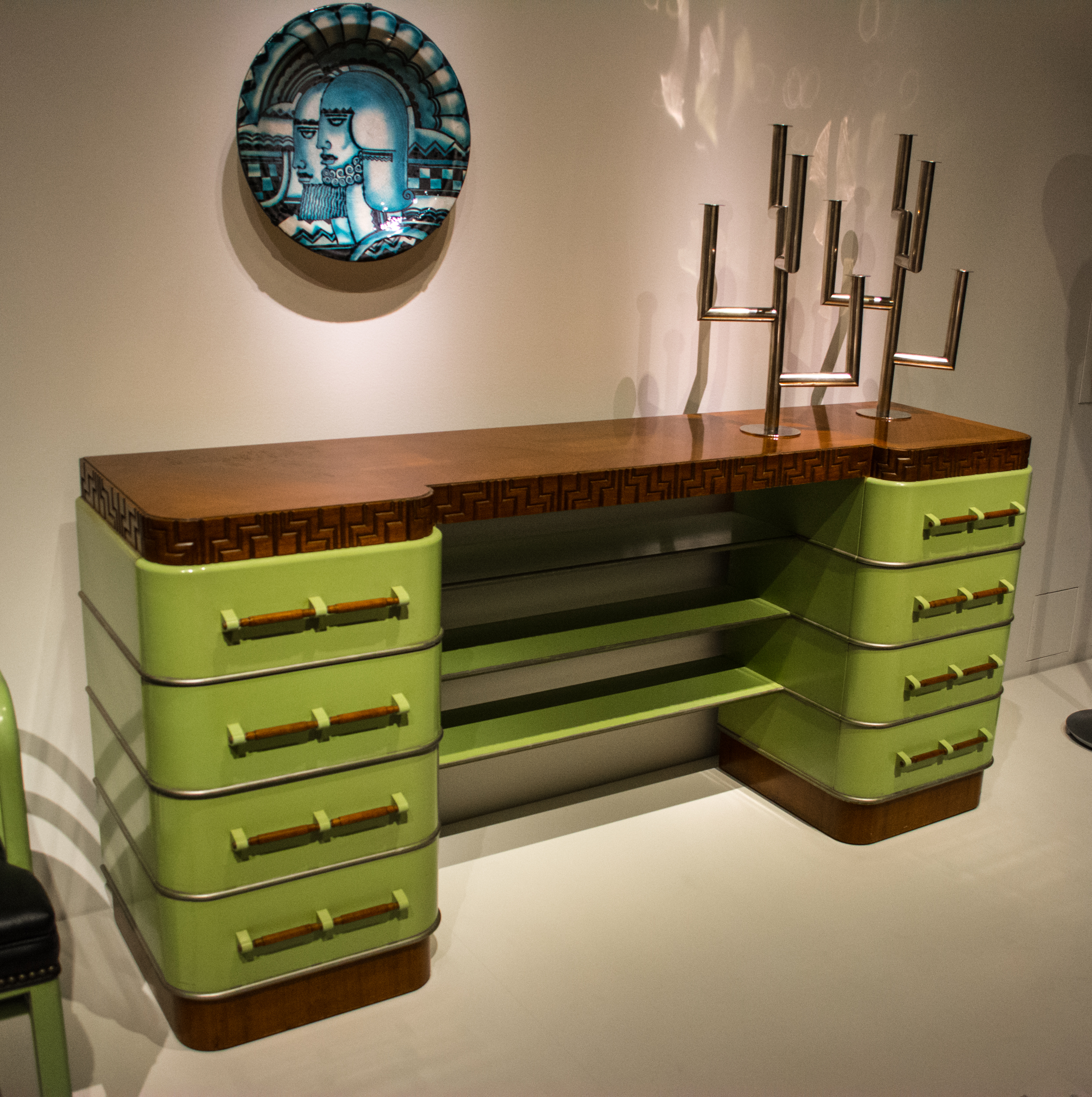
Desk (1930s)

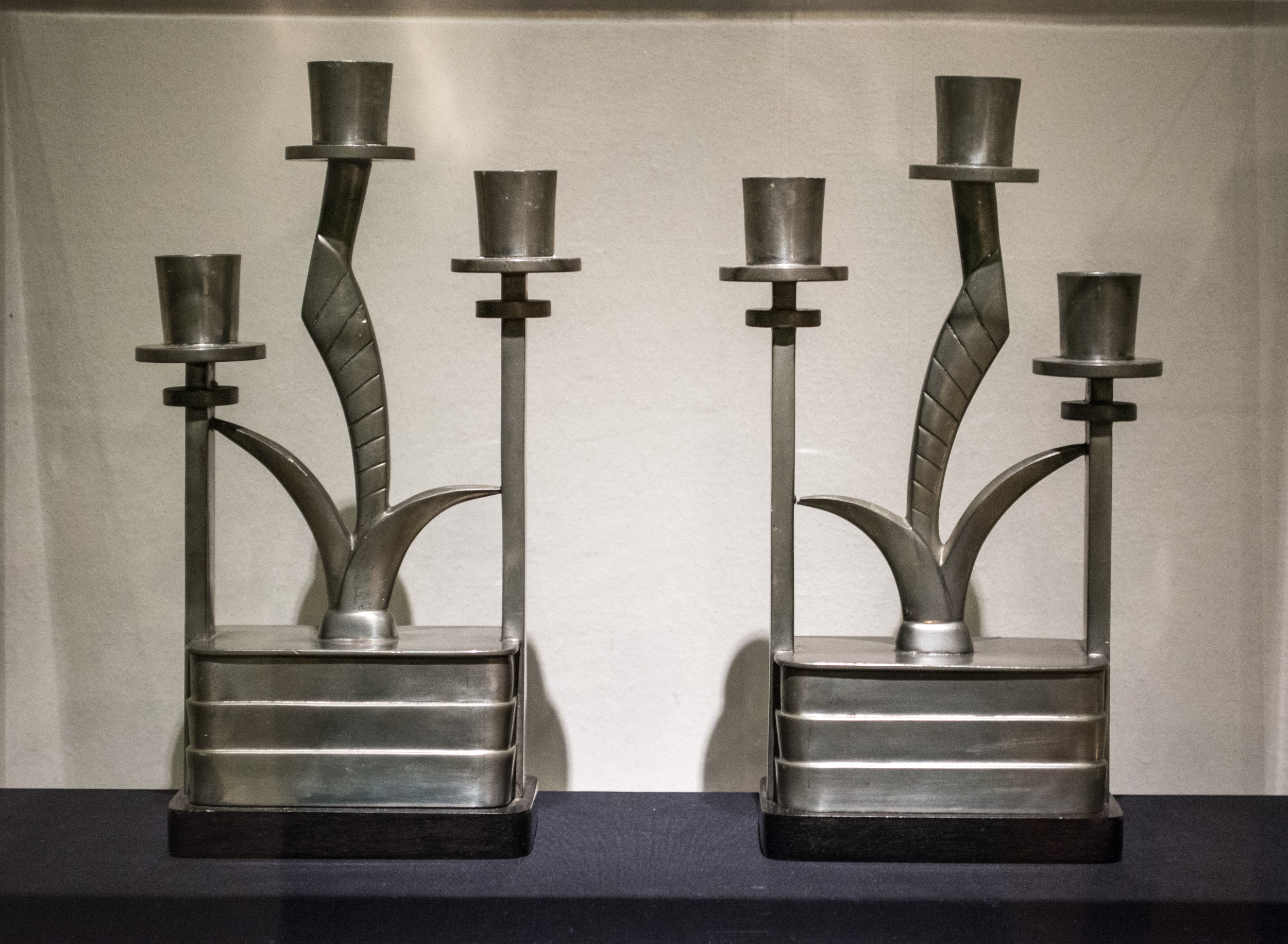
Candelabra

Born in Berlin, Germany, Weber initially trained under the royal cabinet maker Eduard Schultz in Potsdam, before enrolling at the Kunstgewerbeschule (School of applied arts) in Berlin in 1908 where he studied under Bruno Paul. Graduating in 1912, Weber went on to work in Paul's office, having previously assisted his tutor in the design of the German pavilion at the 1910 'Exposition Universalle' in Brussels.

It was the design of a second pavilion that proved to be the turning point in Weber's career. Paul sent his assistant to San Francisco, California, to supervise work on the German pavilion being built for the Panama-Pacific International Exposition of 1915. However, Weber was soon overtaken by other international events. The onset of World War I prevented him from returning home despite the construction of the pavilion being suspended, leaving him stranded in California.

== American success ==
Seeing greater opportunity in the New World, Weber stayed in the United States after the war ended, later becoming a U. S. citizen in 1924, anticipating later European talents such as Ludwig Mies van der Rohe, Marcel Breuer and the Hoffmanns. Weber went a step further towards forging a new identity in the New World, adopting the less Germanic name "Kem", formed from combining his three initials.

First working in Santa Barbara, designing Spanish Colonial interiors and several buildings inspired by ancient Mayan, Egyptian and Minoan architecture, Weber moved to Los Angeles in 1921 and began working in the industrial and product design field for which he is perhaps best known. Until 1924 he worked as the Art Director for Barker Brothers, a large furniture and decorating store for whom he designed everything from furniture, interior fittings and packaging in a modernist style.

Weber then established an independent industrial design studio in Hollywood, where he also designed modern sets for films and private residences. The inclusion of his work in the 1928 'International Exposition of Art in Industry' held by New York store Macy's cemented his reputation and he went on to design many products for a wide variety of companies including Widdicomb, Berley & Gay, Friedman Silver and Lawson Time. Many of his designs, such as the copper 'Zephyr' desk clock (1933), can be classified as 'Streamline Moderne', which was a popular style in contemporary architecture.

Weber's most famous work is probably the "Airline" chair of 1934, which exemplified the clean, streamlined style of the age, with its seat supported by a cantilevered frame reminiscent of wooden aircraft components. Practical, stylish and economical to construct and ship, the Airline chair failed to find a manufacturer. Most surviving examples come from the batch of 300 made for the Walt Disney Studios, largely handmade. Weber is also noted for being the main architect of the Walt Disney Studios complex in Burbank, California.

== Publications ==
- Fiell, Charlotte; Fiell, Peter (1999). Design of the 20th century. Köln: Taschen. OCLC 607371329.
- Long, Christopher (2014). Kem Weber, Designer and Architect. New Haven: Yale University press. ISBN 978-0-30020627-2.
