= Martha Kantor =

American glass painter (1986–1981)

- Born: Martha Ryther; 1896; Boston, Massachusetts, U.S.
- Died: 1981 (aged 84–85); New City, New York, U.S.
- Education: Modern Art School
- Occupation: Glass painter
- Spouse(s): Jock Fulton; Morris Kantor

Martha Kantor (1896–1981) was an American glass painter. She was a member of the art colony in New City, New York, and "recognized as a master" of painting on glass."

== Early life ==
Kantor was born as Martha Ryther in 1896 in Boston, Massachusetts. Her mother, Martha Dickinson, was a painter and Kantor took painting lessons from Maurice Prendergast at a young age. She subsequently studied under Hugo Robus and William Zorach at the Modern Art School in New York City.

== Career ==
Kantor joined an art colony in New City, New York co-founded by her former teacher Hugo Robus and another artist, Henry Varnum Poor in 1918. By the 1930s, she took up painting on glass, an old method of folk art. She painted Cape Cod houses and still lifes. Her work was exhibited at the Zabriskie Gallery in New York City. According to The New York Times, she became "recognized as a master of the medium."

Kantor was the founder of the Rockland Foundation, later known as the Rockland Center for the Arts in West Nyack, New York.

== Personal life, death and legacy ==
Kantor was married twice. Her first husband was Jock Fulton. Her second husband, Morris Kantor, was an artist. Kantor resided on South Mountain Road in New City, New York, and she summered in Provincetown, Massachusetts.

Kantor died of cancer on January 10, 1981 in New City, New York, aged 84. She was the subject of a retrospective exhibition at the Rockland Center for the Arts in November 1981. One of her paintings, Reading In Bed, is in the permanent collection of the Smithsonian American Art Museum in Washington, D.C. The Art Institute of Chicago holds a screen-printed silk work by her.
