= Ilonka Karasz =

Hungarian-American designer and illustrator (1896–1981)

- Born: July 13, 1896; Budapest, Kingdom of Hungary
- Died: May 26, 1981 (aged 84); Warwick, New York, U.S.
- Occupations: Designer; Illustrator
- Notable work: Covers for The New Yorker

Ilonka Karasz (July 13, 1896 – May 26, 1981), was a Hungarian-American designer, interior decorator, painter and illustrator known for avant-garde industrial design and for her many New Yorker magazine covers.

== Early life and education ==
Karasz was born in the Hungarian capital, Budapest, the oldest of three children of Mary Huber Karasz and silversmith Samuel Karasz. One of her younger sisters was the fashion designer and textile artist Mariska Karasz. She studied art at the Royal Academy of Arts and Crafts during a period when the reigning aesthetic owed much to the Wiener Werkstätte and was one of the first women to be admitted to the school. At the age of 17, she immigrated to the United States in 1913, and began to make a career for herself in New York City‘s Greenwich Village, where she established herself as an influential practitioner of modern art and design. In 1914, Karasz co-founded (with Winold Reiss) the European-American artists' collective Society of Modern Art, and shortly afterwards she was commissioned to create advertising for the department store Bonwit Teller. For a few years in the late teens she taught textile design at the Modern Art School.

== Career ==
=== Textile and industrial design ===
During her late teens, Karasz taught textile design at the Modern Art School, an institution founded in 1915, where she taught alongside Marguerite and William Zorach. Karasz and a group of other European-born artists and designers, including Winold Reiss, founded the Society of Modern Art in 1914. The organization published Modern Art Collector, which published much of Karasz’s early designs. Her first work presented in the journal was a theatrical poster with checkerboard motifs, a common Austrian-German graphic style. The publication also showcased her bold, stylized floral patterns, cover designs, book illustrations, typography, and decorative panels.

Karasz was the founding director of Design Group, a firm of industrial designers, craftspeople, and artists. From the 1910s to the 1960s, her designs—inspired equally by folk art and modern art—found their way into a wide variety of textiles, wallpaper, rugs, ceramics, furniture, silverware, and toys. Between 1916 and 1918 she won several prizes (and gained visibility) for textile designs entered in competitions run by the fashion magazine Women's Wear. As early as 1918, she was being called "one of the best designers of modern textiles," while by 1950 she was considered one of America's leading wallpaper designers, known for experimenting with different methods for transfer and layering of images. In the 1950s, she was one of a handful of artists selected by the aluminum manufacturer Alcoa to experiment with the use of aluminum for wall coverings.

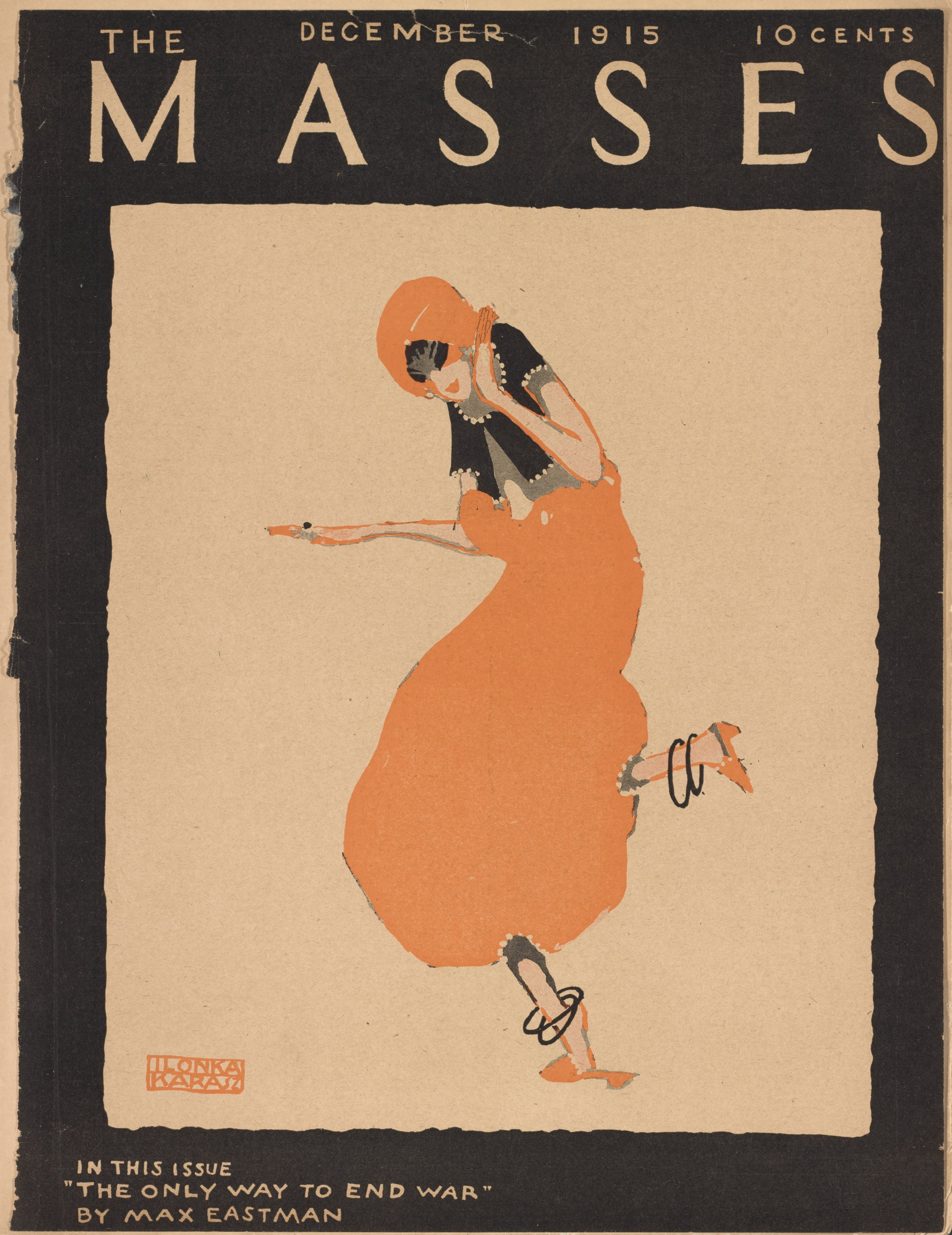
Cover by Ilonka Karasz, The Masses, December 1915

Karasz did textile work throughout her career for manufacturers in the United States, including Mallinson, Schumacher, Lesher-Whitman, Dupont-Rayon, Schwarzenbach and Huber, Cheney, Susquehanna Silk Mills, Standard Textile, and Belding Brothers. One of her most successful designs, Oak Leaves, was commissioned by Lesher-Whitman and appeared in many publications on modern design and contemporary textiles. Karasz’s fellow designers considered her a pioneer in modern woven textiles in America, a field avoided by many textile creatives because of the requirement of having to understand the Jacquard loom.

Karasz ventured into a number of unusual areas connected with textile design and production. She was known as a pioneer of modern textile designs requiring the use of the Jacquard loom, and she became one of the few women to design textiles for planes and cars. In the late 1920s, Dupont-Rayon Company hired her to help improve the texture and feel of rayon and generally raise the production standards for this then-new material. Karasz experimented with many new materials and manufacturing processes throughout her career. Her work for F. Schumacher and Company in 1929 was used in a Fokker airplane.

Karasz's exploration of furniture and silverware was most intense in the late 1920s and 1930s. Her furniture was often rectilinear and strongly planar, inspired by the European De Stijl movement; she also designed a number of multifunctional pieces. In 1928, she was included in a European-American exhibition put on by Macy's department store in New York, alongside such prominent designers as Kem Weber, Bruno Paul, and Josef Hoffmann. In another 1928 exhibition, organized by American Designers' Gallery in New York, she was the only woman given responsibility for designing an entire room, and in fact she designed both a model studio apartment and a nursery. The latter is considered possibly the first modern nursery designed in America, and Karasz followed it up with several later nursery designs pragmatically featuring convertible furniture and washable fabrics. Her nursery designs focused on giving a child “an intimate sense of owning a room instead of being owned by it.” Rooms that allowed children to explore and develop intellectual, dramatic, and spatial capabilities. She also tried to incorporate elements that would help very young children learn, such as color-coded knobs on dressers. Her simple design aesthetic for furniture reflected the attention to designing for mass production.

From 1934–1937, Karasz designed and decorated ceramic dinnerware for Buffalo Pottery.

=== Illustration ===
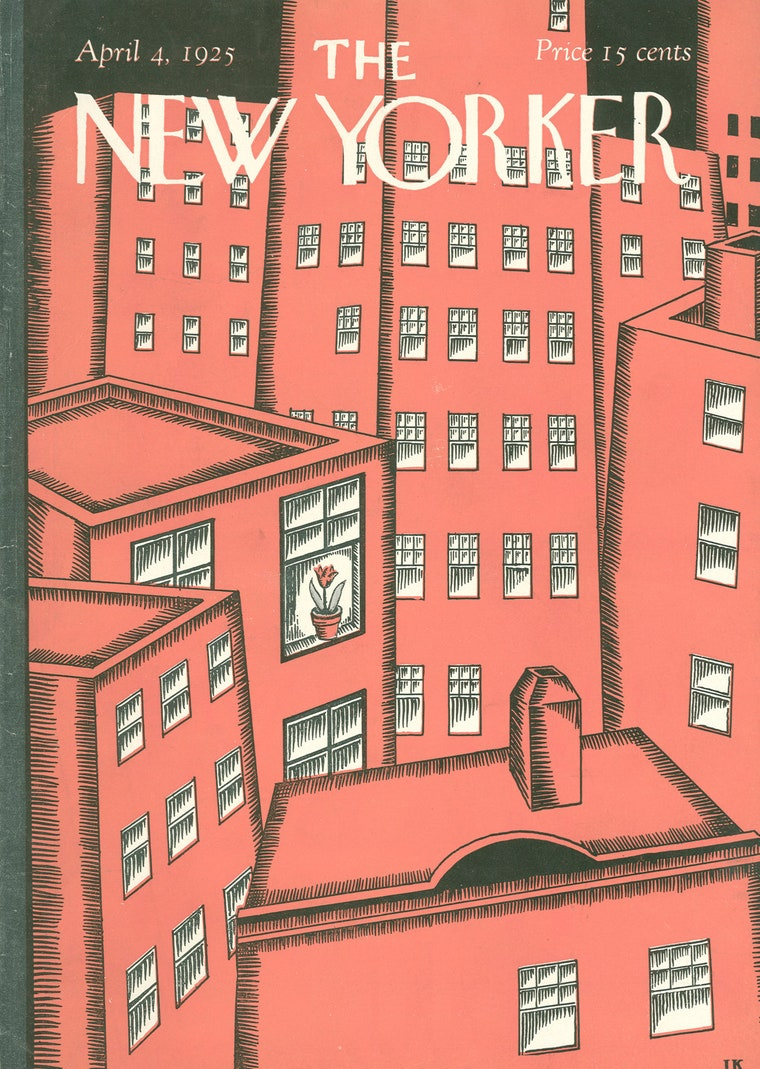
Karasz's first cover for The New Yorker (April 4, 1925)

During the illustration portion of her career, Karasz was often referred to as the “hermit painter”. This nickname, however, misrepresents the repeated work she completed for various Greenwich Village publications and the impressions she made on peers. Karasz began painting covers for The New Yorker in 1924 and continued up to 1973. She had a total of 186 New Yorker covers across those six decades, many of them featuring lively vignettes of daily life viewed from above and drawn using unusual color combinations. She also created covers and illustrations for avant-garde magazines—including Guido Bruno's Bruno's Weekly, Modern Art Collector, and Playboy: A Portfolio of Art and Satire—as well as for children's books such as The Heavenly Tenants. Less well known are the numerous maps she created, mostly for books but also as magazine covers.

== Personal life ==
In 1920 Karasz married Dutch chemist and pianist Willem Nyland (died 1975), with whom she had two children. They built a house in Brewster, New York, where Karasz lived for most of her life and which was featured in a 1928 spread in House Beautiful magazine. The couple lived in Java between 1929 and 1931, where Karasz complemented her eclectic mix of modern and traditional furnishings with murals that paid homage to the surrounding tropical foliage.

In 1924, Karasz and her husband attended a lecture by the Armenian-born spiritual teacher George Ivanovich Gurdjieff during his first trip to the United States. The couple subsequently started involving themselves in the teachings of Gurdjieff and working with his representative in the United States, A. R. Orage. They often visited Gurdjieff in Paris and were the first persons to visit him there immediately after the end of the war in 1945. On this occasion, Gurdjieff asked them to start a group in New York City, which eventually became the Chardavogne Group in 1967, also known as the Institute for Religious Development, and based in Warwick, NY. The couple remained involved in the teachings of Gurdjieff until the end of their lives.

== Death and legacy ==
Karasz died at her daughter's home in Warwick, New York, seven weeks before her 85th birthday. The year after she died, the New York gallery Fifty/50 mounted a solo show of her work. In 2003, a retrospective of her paintings, prints, and drawings entitled "Enchanting Modern: Ilonka Karasz, 1896–1981," was mounted by the Georgia Museum of Art. Several dozen of her drawings and sample books for wallpaper, rugs, and metalware are in the collection of the Cooper Hewitt Museum.
