= Mary Tannahill =

American artist (1863–1951)

Mary Harvey Tannahill
- Born: January 11, 1863; Warren County, North Carolina
- Died: June 21, 1951 (aged 88); Warrenton, North Carolina
- Resting place: Blandford Cemetery, Petersburg, Virginia
- Education: Kenyon Cox, John Henry Twachtman, Harry Siddons Mowbray, J. Alden Weir, Arthur Wesley Dow, and Blanche Lazzell
- Known for: Painter, printmaker, embroiderer and batik maker

Mary Harvey Tannahill (January 11, 1863 – June 21, 1951) was an American painter, printmaker, embroiderer and batik maker. She studied in the United States and Europe and spent 30 summers in Provincetown, Massachusetts, with the artist colony there. She was instructed by Blanche Lazzell there and assumed the style of the Provincetown Printers. She exhibited her works through a number of artist organizations. A native of North Carolina, she spent much of her career based in New York.

== Early life ==
Tannahill was born on January 11, 1863, on "Kinderhook", the family estate in Warren County, North Carolina. Her parents were Sallie Jones Sims and Robert Tannahill, a Confederate soldier and businessman who was active in Petersburg, Virginia, and New York City. He moved the family to New York in 1865 and they lived at 44 East 65th Street. Her father worked as a cotton factor and between 1880 and 1882 was president of the New York Cotton Exchange. The family had a home on Lake Mahopac that they visited in the summer and a house in Englewood, New Jersey. They frequently visited Petersburg, Virginia and Warrenton, North Carolina, where other family members lived.

Tannahill and her siblings were educated privately. She early displayed an interest in art that was fostered and encouraged by her parents and due to the family's wealth, she was comfortable pursuing her interest. The family was close-knit; few of the children married, and none had surviving offspring.

Robert Tannahill died in 1883, leaving behind eight children, of whom Mary was the eldest.

== Education ==
She studied with various teachers, including Kenyon Cox, John Henry Twachtman, Harry Siddons Mowbray, J. Alden Weir, and Arthur Wesley Dow. From late May to early October in 1895, she studied under Theodore Robinson in Townshend, Vermont. He had just returned from his studies with Claude Monet in Giverny, France. Over 50 paintings were exhibited by his ten students at the Wheelock House. She studied art in Europe before World War I, including Germany, where she was harassed because she was assumed to be English.

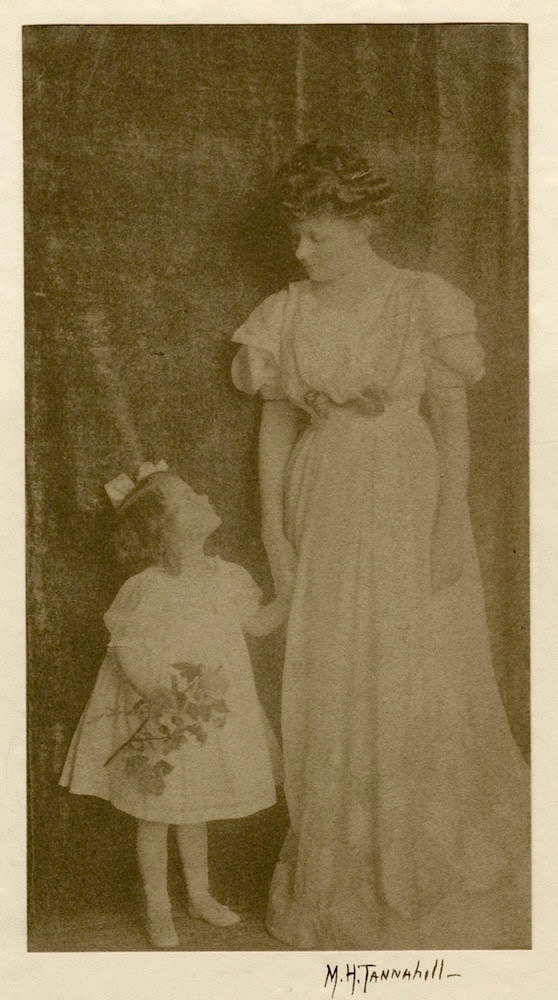
Mary Harvey Tannahill, Mother and daughter, 1910, photograph, Provincetown

She returned to the New York and began to spend the summers on Cape Cod and in Provincetown, Massachusetts, where she later studied with Blanche Lazzell.

== Career ==
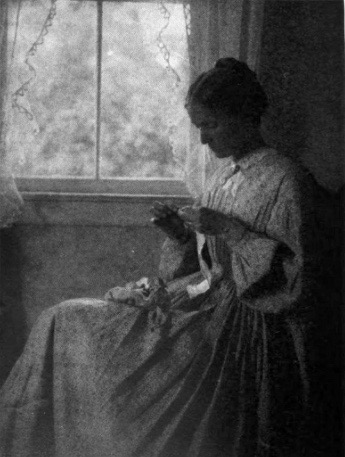
Mary Harvey Tannahill, Untitled (Woman sitting by a window), Competition for Women Photographers, 1912

She came to be known first for her miniatures painted with watercolor on ivory, a medium in which she met with some success. The Philadelphia Society of Miniature Painters exhibited her works early in her career and she was a member of the Pennsylvania Society of Miniature Painters. She also had an early interest in photography and submitted a photograph to the Competition for Women Photographers in 1912.

She then painted with tempera and oils, and explored creating works of art with embroidery, batik, and woodblock printing, in the white-line style of the Provincetown Printers.

In 1916, she exhibited at the second annual show of the Provincetown Art Association and spent more than 30 summers at the artist's colony in Provincetown. She continued showing with the Provincetown Art Association almost yearly until 1938, displaying woodblock prints at various exhibits. She soon became a close friend of William and Marguerite Zorach and Robert Henri as well, through them becoming introduced to the work of the Art Students League of New York. In 1917, the Society of Independent Artists held their first show, in which two of her pieces were displayed. She exhibited more of her work with the Society two more times. By 1921, she exhibited her work An American Batik at the American Museum of Natural History in New York. It was also an example in the book First Lessons in Batik published in 1921.

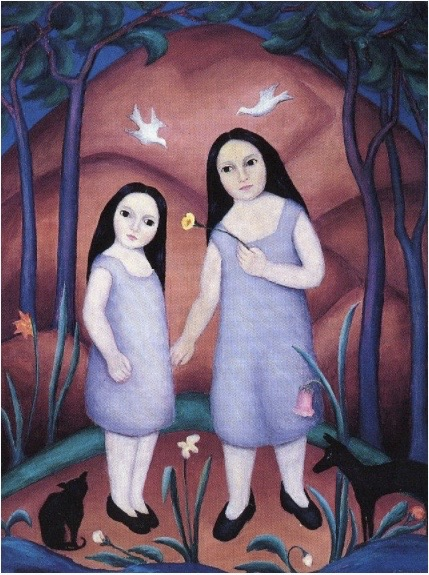
Mary Harvey Tannahill, The Sisters, 1920, oil on canvas, Greenville County Museum of Art, South Carolina

Stylistically, Tannahill's work derived some of its influence from folk art, which was combined with modernism. She evinced interest in continued artistic growth throughout her career, absorbing influences such as Cubism and Precisionism in some of her later works. A Raleigh newspaper critic, writing in The News & Observer in 1937, called her an "unusual painter of familiar objects in the modern manner", and she was sometimes described as an "artist's artist"; she herself said that "her work was considered modern but not overly so". The "Eight Southern Women" exhibit, held in 1986 at the Museum of Art in Greenville County, South Carolina and the Gibbes Art Gallery in Charleston, included her works.

Her work was displayed over her career at the Panama–Pacific International Exposition in San Francisco and at shows by the National Association of Women Painters and Sculptors. Pieces also appeared in exhibits at the Brooklyn Museum, the Art Students League of New York, the Knoedler Galleries, the American Society of Miniature Painters, and the American and New York Watercolor Clubs. She was an early member of the National Association of Women Painters and sculptors, and was active in a variety of North Carolina artists' organizations as well, including the North Carolina Professional Artists' Club, of which she eventually served as vice-president.

Tannahill's paintings and fabrics can be found in the Newark Museum, Greenville County Museum of Art, Greenville, South Carolina, Zimmerli Art Museum at Rutgers University, and in many private collections. Her work is at the Bibliothèque nationale de France. A collection of her work is on display in Warrenton, at the Green-Polk-McAuslan House within the Warrenton Historic District.

== Personal life ==
Tannahill, described as having been tall, blond, and striking in appearance in her youth, never married. She was a Christian Scientist who believed in suffrage for women.

She lived in New York by 1914, giving her address as Van Dyck Studios at 939 Eighth Avenue. Beginning in 1916, she spent her summers in Massachusetts a tradition that she continued for 30 summers. She spent the last years of her life and died in Warrenton. She was buried in Petersburg at Blandford Cemetery.

== Legacy ==
Since her death, Tannahill's work has continued to be included in exhibitions, such as Eight Southern Women at the Greenville County Museum of Art in 1986 and Nine from North Carolina in 1989 at the National Museum of Women in the Arts and in a traveling show, like the exhibit sponsored by the Fayetteville Museum of Art in North Carolina.
