= John Storrs (sculptor) =

American sculptor (1885–1956)

John Henry Bradley Storrs
- Born: June 25, 1885; Chicago
- Died: April 26, 1956 (aged 70)
- Known for: Sculpture
- Spouse: Marguerite Deville Chabrol

John Henry Bradley Storrs (June 25, 1885 – April 26, 1956), also known as John Bradley Storrs and John H. Storrs, was an American modernist sculptor best remembered for his art deco sculptures that examined the relationship between architecture and sculpture.

== Life ==
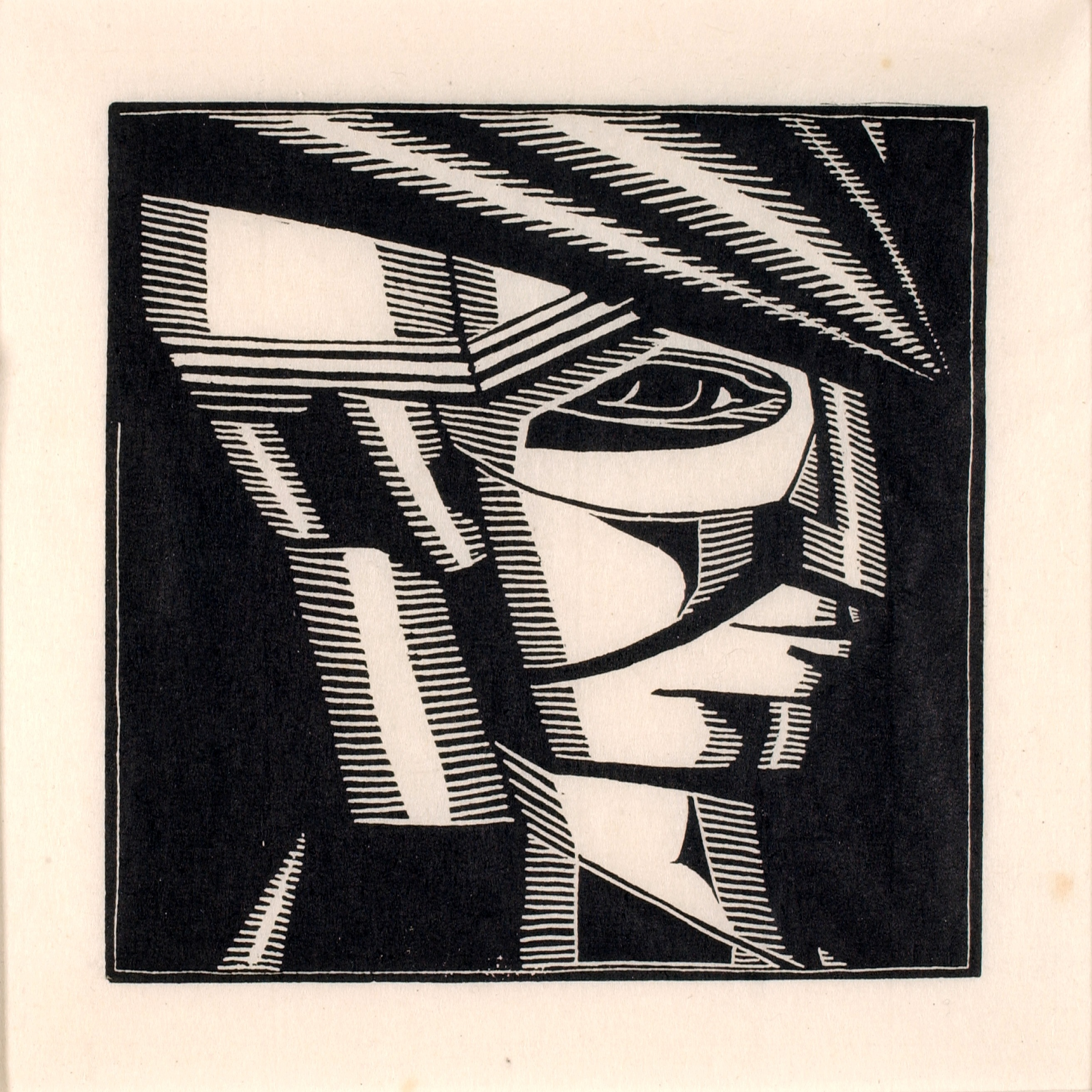
Head, woodcut on paper, c. 1920, Smithsonian American Art Museum

Storrs was born in Chicago in 1885, son of architect D. W. Storrs. In 1905, he traveled to Berlin to study singing, but he soon decided to become a sculptor. He studied with Lorado Taft at the Art Institute of Chicago, with Bela Pratt at the School of the Museum of Fine Arts in Boston and with Charles Grafly at the Pennsylvania Academy of the Fine Arts. By 1911, he was living in Paris, where he studied with Auguste Rodin and also attended the Académie Julian. He gradually moved from representational sculpture and wood engravings to the machine-like sculptures for which he is best known.

'Forms in Space, Number 1', stainless steel and copper sculpture, 1927, Metropolitan Museum of Art.

During his time in France, Storrs became friends with Jacques Lipchitz. In 1914, Storrs married the novelist and writer Marguerite Deville Chabrol and started dividing his time between France and the United States. In the 1930s, Storrs turned to abstract painting that often suggested the human figure. During World War II Storrs was twice arrested and imprisoned by the German occupation forces. After being released, he returned to his studio in Mer, France, and worked and lived there until his death in 1956.

== Work ==
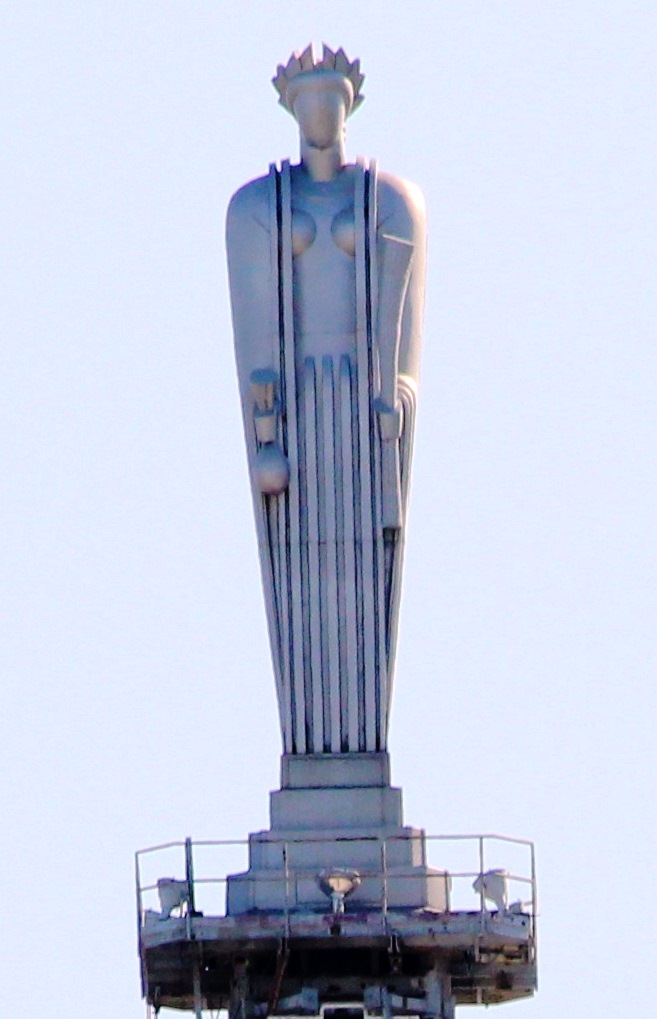
Ceres, created by John Storrs

Storrs is best remembered for his late-career abstract works, often cast from materials not used in traditional sculpture such as aluminum and stainless steel. He is responsible for the Ceres sculpture at the top of the Chicago Board of Trade Building.
