= Eduard Buk Ulreich =

American painter

- Born: February 12, 1889; Kőszeg, Austria-Hungary (present-day Hungary)
- Died: July 17, 1966 (aged 77); San Francisco, California, U.S.
- Resting place: Golden Gate National Cemetery, San Bruno, California
- Education: Kansas City Art Institute; Pennsylvania Academy of the Fine Arts
- Known for: Murals; Southwestern motifs illustrations
- Notable work: Murals at the United States Courthouse (Tallahassee, Florida); Advance Guard of the West; Arizona Cowboys
- Spouse: Nura

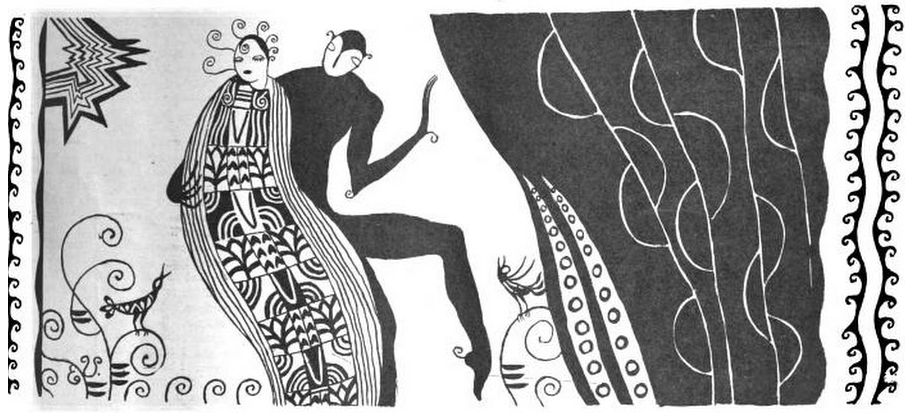
A drawing by Eduard Buk Ulreich, from the cover of a 1916 publication.

Eduard Buk Ulreich (February 12, 1889 – July 17, 1966) was an American artist. Born in Hungary, his work includes murals at the United States Courthouse (Tallahassee, Florida, 1936) completed in 1939. His work is also at the National Museum of American Illustration.

The U.S. Courthouse in Tallahassee's main lobby is decorated with eight murals by Ulreich illustrating scenes from Florida's history. The murals were funded by the Treasury Department's Section of Painting and Sculpture, a New Deal program that commissioned artists. Ulreich won a competition to paint the murals, which he completed in 1939. He also painted Southwestern motifs and worked as an illustrator.

== History ==
Born in Kőszeg, Austria-Hungary in 1889, Ulreich came to Kansas City, Missouri, at six months old. He studied under Mlle F. Blumberg and at the Kansas City Art Institute and worked as a cowboy on the Apache Indian reservation in Arizona. He sent a painting to the Pennsylvania Academy of the Fine Arts and won a scholarship to the school. In the 1930s Ulreich worked for the Works Progress Administration (WPA). He travelled the Southwestern United States and did many horse scenes. He and his wife Nura also did illustration work, including for children's books. He also taught.

He was in Europe for several months before returning to New York in 1915 and serving in the U.S. Army. After World War I he did his first murals for Denishawn Studios in California and then painted church murals, wall hangings and did marble mosaics for the 1933 Chicago World's Fair's Century of Progress exhibition. He died in San Francisco in 1966 and is buried at the Golden Gate National Cemetery in San Bruno, San Mateo County, California.

== Work ==
- Advance Guard of the West (1940)
- Eight murals depicting Florida history at the Old Post Office in Tallahassee, Florida
- Arizona Cowboys (1947) at the Tate Museum of Art
