= Dewing Woodward =

American painter

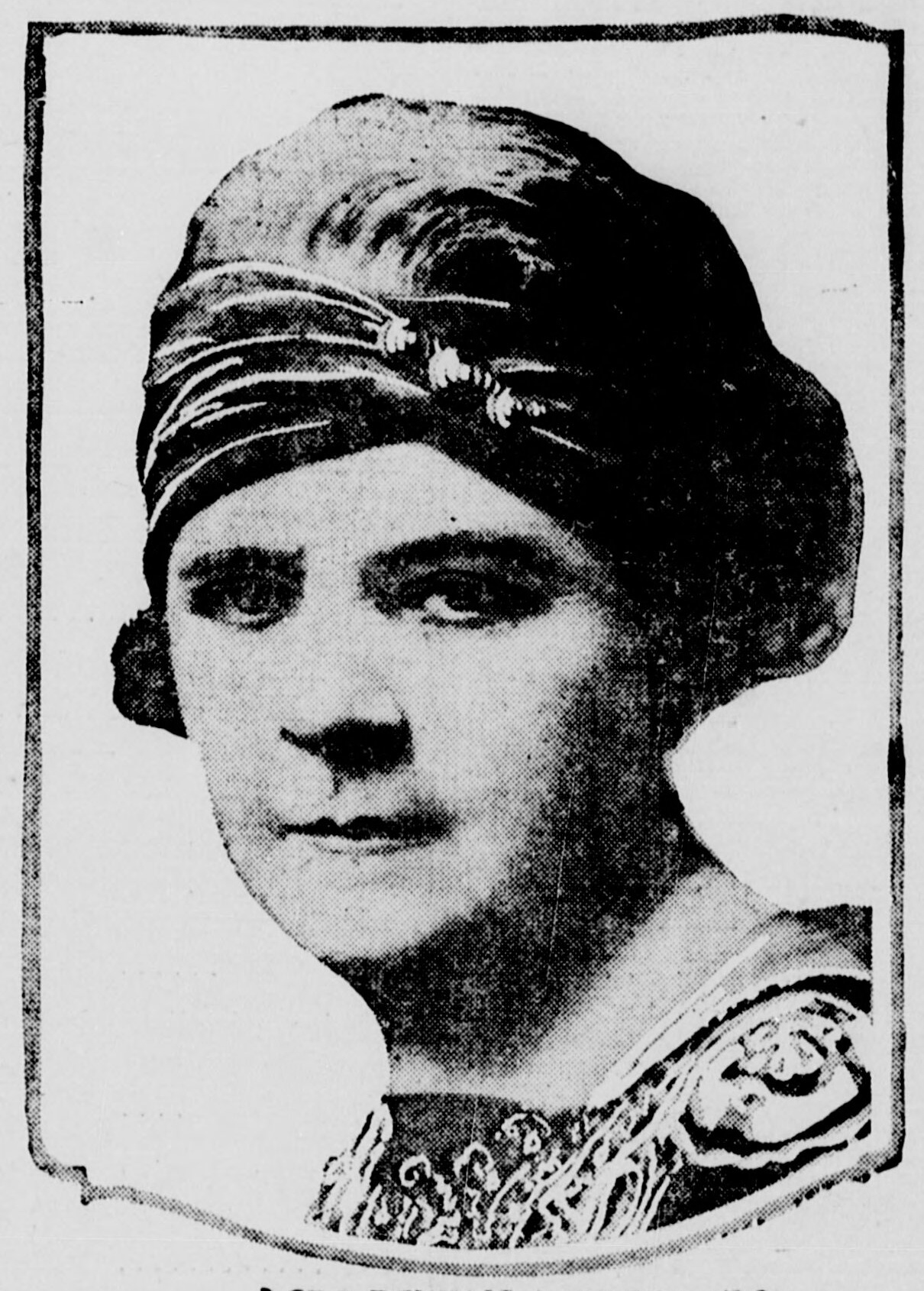
Woodward, c. 1916

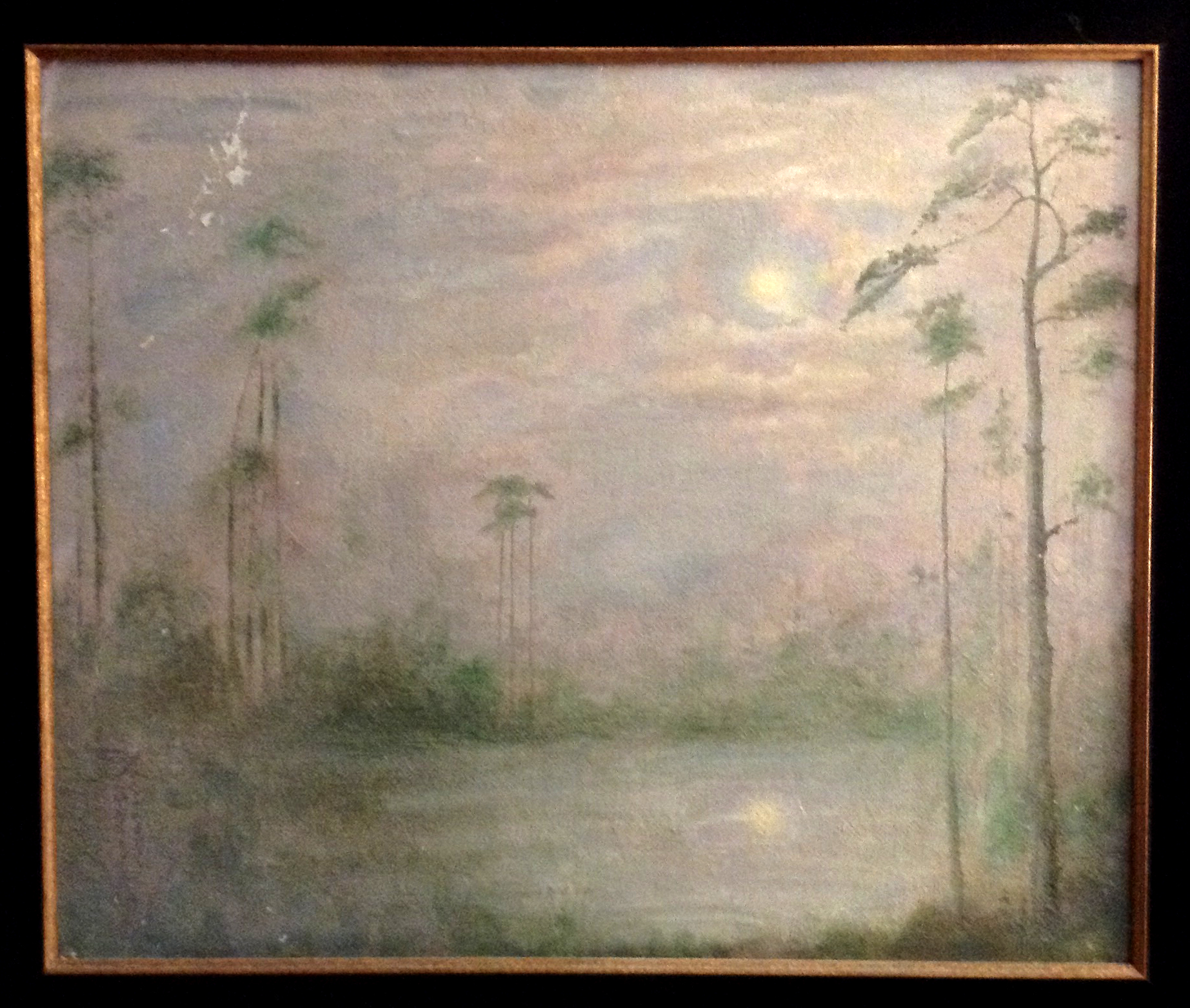
Everglades Moonlight, oil c.1930s, in private collection

Martha Dewing Woodward (1856–1950) was an American artist and art teacher. According to her obituary in The New York Times, she was "one of the nation's leading painters." Among her accomplishments, she founded the first art school in Provincetown, Massachusetts, in 1896. In 1907, Woodward and her partner, Louise Johnson, founded the Blue Dome Fellowship in Woodstock, New York, which Woodward continued in Florida after her move there. Woodward's art and teachings thrived in Florida, where her work had a lasting impact.

Woodward studied at the Pennsylvania Academy of Fine Art in Philadelphia and the Academie Julian in Paris. In addition to teaching at her summer art schools, Woodward taught art at the Female Institute in Lewisburg, Pennsylvania (which later became a part of Bucknell University), the Women's College of Baltimore (later Goucher College in Towson, Maryland), the Ethical Culture School in New York City, and the University of Miami in Coral Gables, Florida. Woodward was active in the art world through painting and volunteering until her death in 1950.

== Early life and education ==
Woodward was born on June 6, 1856, in Williamsport, Pennsylvania. She was the youngest of the eight children of John Vanderbilt Woodward and Wealthy Ann York Woodward. Her grandfather, Apollos Woodward, served as an aide to George Washington during the Whiskey Rebellion. Their home, called Springside, located at 721 Fifth Avenue, Williamsport, was originally a log house before being enlarged in 1845. The Woodwards added a studio above the kitchen of the Southern style home for Woodward to use as a studio. Woodward researcher, Ralph Rees, believes that the young Woodward taught art lessons from this home studio.

== Career ==
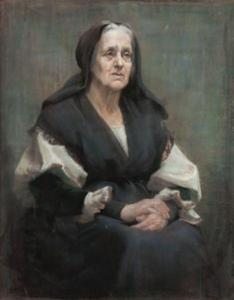
Woodward's Tout Sera Bienot Fini, 1892

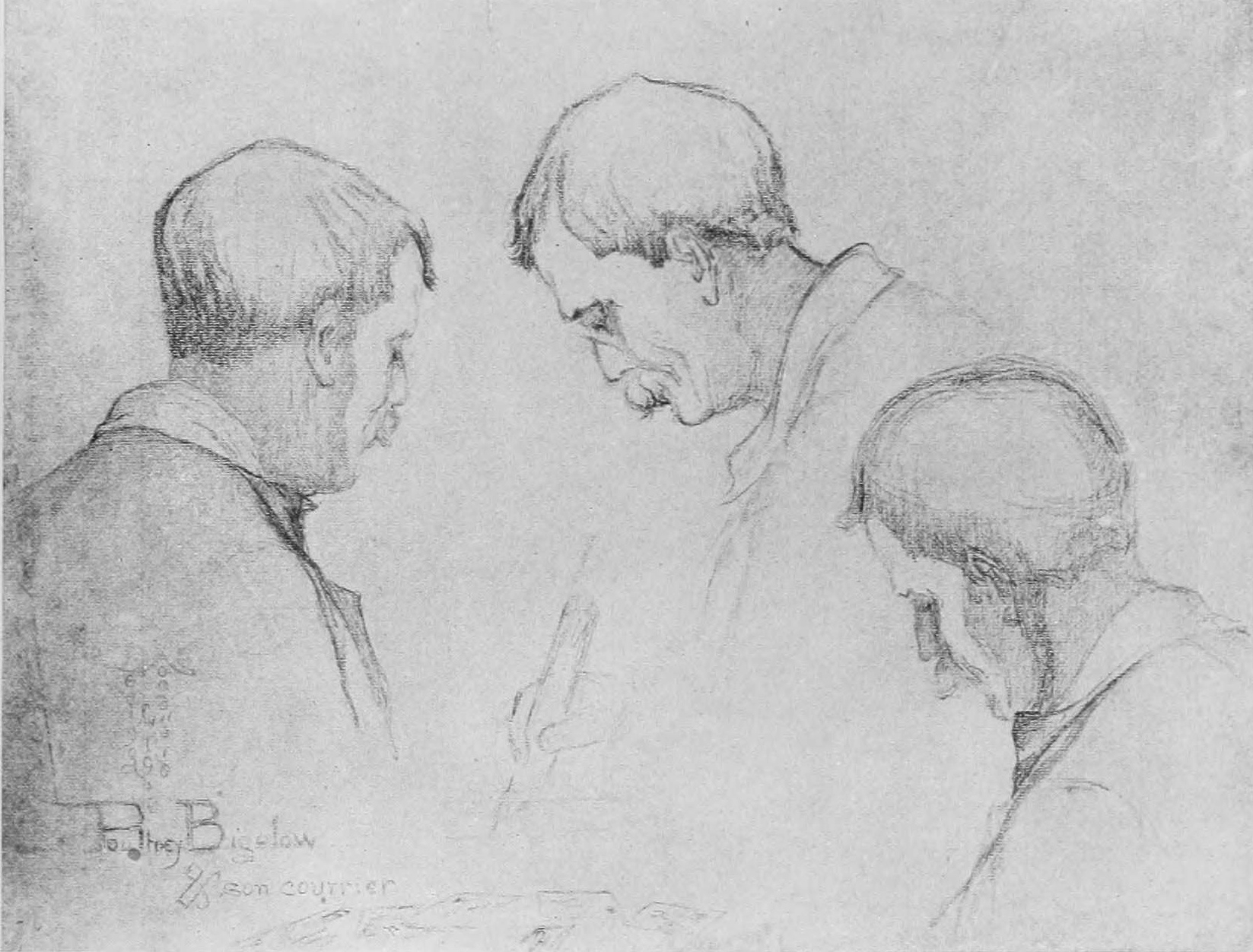
Woodward's 1917 portrait drawing of Poultney Bigelow, a writer and friend of Woodward's

Woodward began painting at a young age. A portrait she painted of her father when she was 11 years old was praised for its skillful and mature style. Woodward attended the Hattie Hall Seminary for Young Ladies in Williamsport. She later attended the Pennsylvania Academy of Fine Arts in Philadelphia, and the Academie Julian in Paris with Robert Fleury, Jacques Blanche, and Jean Francois Raffaelli. At age 26, Woodward was appointed art professor at the Female Institute of the University of Lewisburg (which later became part of Bucknell University). As the only art professor at the Female Institute, she taught 28-35 students in classes ranging from drawing to inks to china decoration to tapestry. In 1889, she became head of the art department at the Women's College of Baltimore (later Goucher College) and served as principal of Goucher's School of Art from 1891 to 1892. Branching beyond teaching art, Woodward was also a member of the Baltimore's Water-Color Club and Charcoal Club of Baltimore.

In the summer of 1896, after several years living and studying in France, Dewing Woodward established the Cape Cod School of Drawing and Painting in Provincetown, MA. The school is now recognized as the first art school in Provincetown, predating Charles Hawthorne’s Cape Cod School of Art, founded 1899. The first students were from Felix Adler’s Ethical Culture School in New York City, where Woodward was head of the art department. Among those students that first year was Norwegian-born artist, Jonas Lie (1880-1940).

Woodward shared her home and studio in Provincetown with Laura Louise Johnson. The two women lived and worked together until the 1920s according to various census records, city directories, and other sources. Laura Louise Johnson was one of six daughters of Henry and Margaret Johnson, who lived at 901 West 4th St., Williamsport, Pennsylvania.

Woodward and Johnson had several cottages in Provincetown, the "Pungo,” “Willows,” and “Kedge.” Built on a high dune at 1 Commercial Street, the “Pungo” burned to the ground in 1907, destroying paintings, lectures, and $3,000 worth of antiques. Some artworks painted by Woodward in Provincetown were “Clam Diggers Coming Home – Cape Cod,” “Old Maids Pink – Cape Cod,” “Wren Tower,” “Provincetown,” and “Flowers.” Woodward published a number of short stories about her time in Provincetown, Some Adventures of Two Vagabonds, by One of ‘Em, under the pseudonym, Wealthy Ann York (her mother’s maiden name).

Woodward went to Paris again in 1892, living there intermittently for eleven years. She described these years as the happiest time of her life. She maintained a studio called Rue Fromentin, exhibited in the Paris Salon ten times, and was assistant critic at Académie Julian. In 1894, she won the prestigious Grand Prix de Concours de Portrait at the Marseilles International Exposition for her portrait of an elderly woman. This portrait was displayed in the Paris Salon, and is believed to have been destroyed in World War II. She also won the silver medal in Nantes in 1904.

In Europe, Woodward faced discrimination because of her gender, prompting her to drop “Martha” from her name and to use her more androgynous middle name “Dewing.” She was forced to withdraw a painting, Wooden Shoemakers, from the Paris Salon when Jule La Febre told the jury members that the painter was a woman,” and “who knows who might have helped her!”

Returning permanently to America in 1907, Woodward and Johnson established the artist colony, the Blue Dome Fellowship, in Shady-in-the-Catskills where they taught for ten years. Likely branching from Woodward’s strong religious faith, the colony’s name comes from Woodward’s favorite slogan: Worship God under the blue dome of heaven. The colony was located near the Brydcliffe Art Colony in Woodstock, New York. The Blue Dome Fellowship followed the popular French style of painting where artists posed living nude models in the open air. The Fellowship members consisted mainly of women and included many famous people in the arts, including Woodward’s good friend, Poultney Bigelow. The James Cox Gallery in Willow, New York, held a festival in 2006, recreating the painting technique that produced ninety paintings.

In 1908, Woodward wrote and published Some Adventures of Two Vagabonds: By One of ‘Em, a series of short stories about her and Johnson, under the pseudonym Wealthy Ann York, her mother’s maiden name. She also wrote The Mass of the Shepherds of Provence, a short story published in 1911 by Hervey White's Maverick Press.

The Blue Dome Fraternity studio, appropriately called “Red Roof” for its red tiled roof, burned down in 1912, pushing Woodward into financial troubles. Throughout the rest of her life, Woodward struggled financially.

After the loss of her Woodstock studio, Woodward spent the rest of her life in Miami and Coral Gables, Florida. Inspired by the rich foliage and brightly colored birds, Woodward and Johnson would travel by Ford Model T to the Everglades to paint the wildlife. When the University of Miami opened in 1926, Woodward was horrified to learn that no art curriculum was offered. She began teaching art classes for free through the new university's Conservatory of Music. She eventually received a salary. The Conservatory closed in 1928, unable to pay the academic staff. For years afterward, Woodward wrote letters to the university president, begging for some reimbursement as her financial support had disappeared.

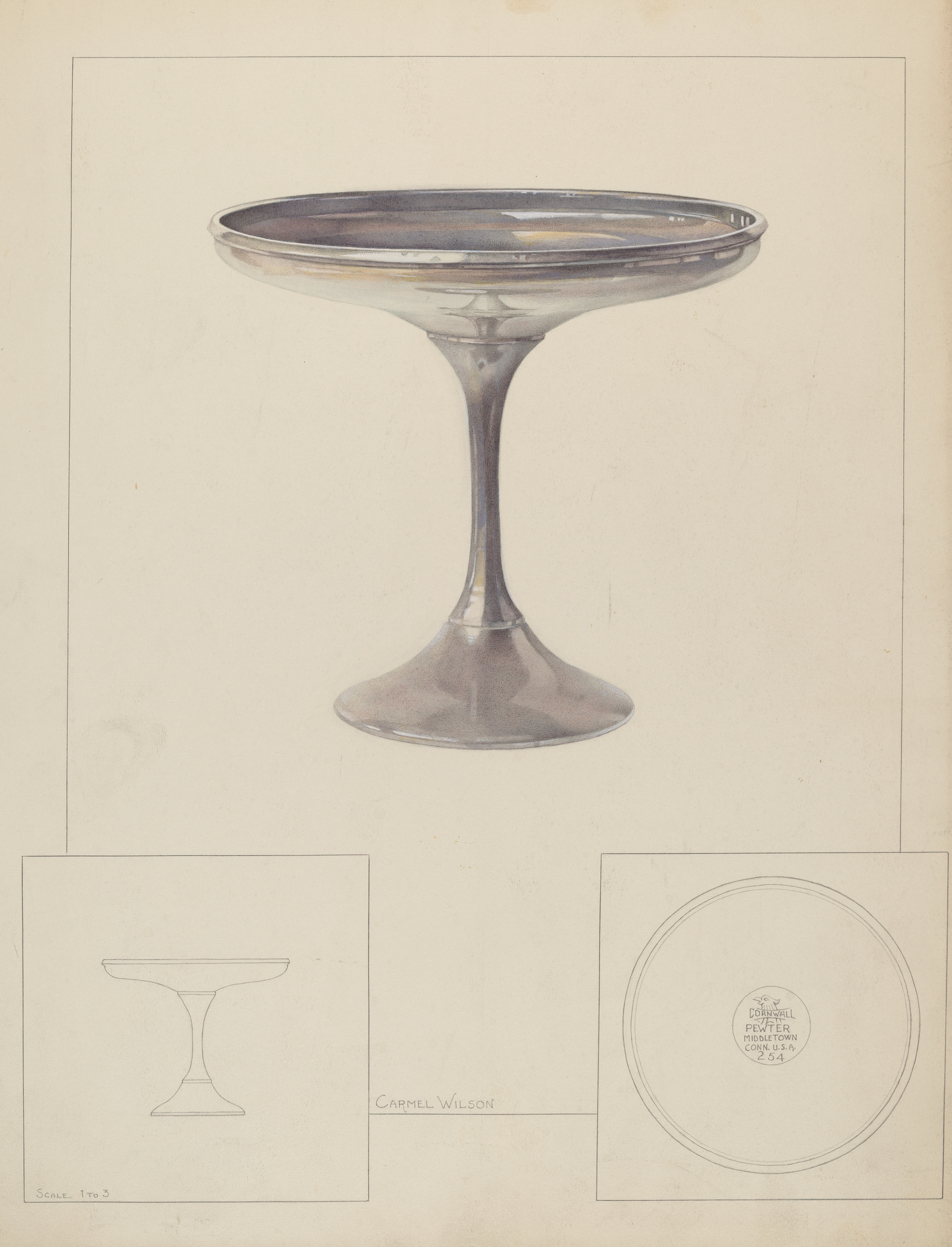
A watercolor rendering of a pewter compote owned by Dewing Woodward, made by Carmel Wilson for the Index of American Design

Well into her eighties, Woodward was active in the arts in Florida, volunteering at local arts and crafts centers, painting, and writing articles (none of which survived). In Coral Gables, Woodward was a charter member of the local Christian Science Church; an instigator in establishing the Blue Dome Fellowship, one of the longest existing art clubs in Florida; founder of Tropical League of Fine Arts, which organized artists’ costume balls to raise funds for a permanent fine art institute; president of the Florida Federation of Art; director of the Florida unit of the Index of American Design and the Florida Society of Arts and Science; and supporter of the Community Art Center and Roundtable of Southern Florida. Woodward was also the author of Colour, an art magazine, in which she discussed her color theories. She was interested in the “echo” theory, a phenomenon of the afterimages of color; for example, when a red object is held against a white background, then pulled away, the afterimage is green. She felt that this reality condoned any adjustment in such color codes.

In the 1930s, Woodward was hired by the Works Progress Administration to paint murals in public buildings to bring culture to the public. They also commissioned her to paint miniatures of historic antiques. Two of her Florida bird studies, Flamingoes and Great Blue Herons, were chosen by Eleanor Roosevelt to hang in the Sub-Treasury Building in Washington, D.C. Woodward's Golden Warblers painting was hung in the Coral Gables Biltmore Hotel when it opened in 1926, and the Miami Woman's Club also housed her Morning Song of the Pines artwork.

== Death and legacy ==
Woodward, "one of the nation’s leading painters" died on July 12, 1950, after a brief illness at the age of 94. The New York Times obituary mentions that she was survived by a grandnephew, Charles V. Woodward of Fort Wayne, Indiana. Her cremated remains were buried in the family plot at Wildwood Cemetery in Williamsport.

In 1991, Bucknell University Association for the Arts honored Woodward with the Academy of Artistic Achievement award.

Her paintings can be found at the University of Miami's Lowe Art Museum, Woodstock Art Association and Museum, the Bigelow Homestead Collection, the Deschanel Collection in Paris, the Provincetown Art Association and Museum, and in private collections, including that of Dr. Alfred Frankel.
