= Joseph Leboit =

American artist (1907–2002)

Joseph Milton Leboit (November 22, 1907 – July 5, 2002) was an American graphic artist and psychoanalyst active in leftist politics.

== Early life ==
Joseph Leboit was born Joseph Leibowitz in New York City in 1907 to recently arrived Eastern European Jewish immigrants. He attended Townsend Harris High School, and at age 15 entered City College of New York, studying art and psychology. He was active in student politics while at City College, protesting participation in the Reserve Officer Training Corps. In 1928 he attended the Art Students League, where he studied painting by Thomas Hart Benton, and drawing by Kimon Nicolaides. In 1932 he was among the leaders of New York students who traveled by bus to Kentucky in support of striking coal miners in Bell County. The bus carrying the students that Leboit was on was turned around, and the students were escorted out of the state by the county prosecutor, Walter B. Smith, and sheriff's deputies. After crossing into Tennessee, Leboit questioned Smith's authority in that state, resulting in his being beaten by the deputies in reprisal.

== Artistic career ==
=== WPA years ===
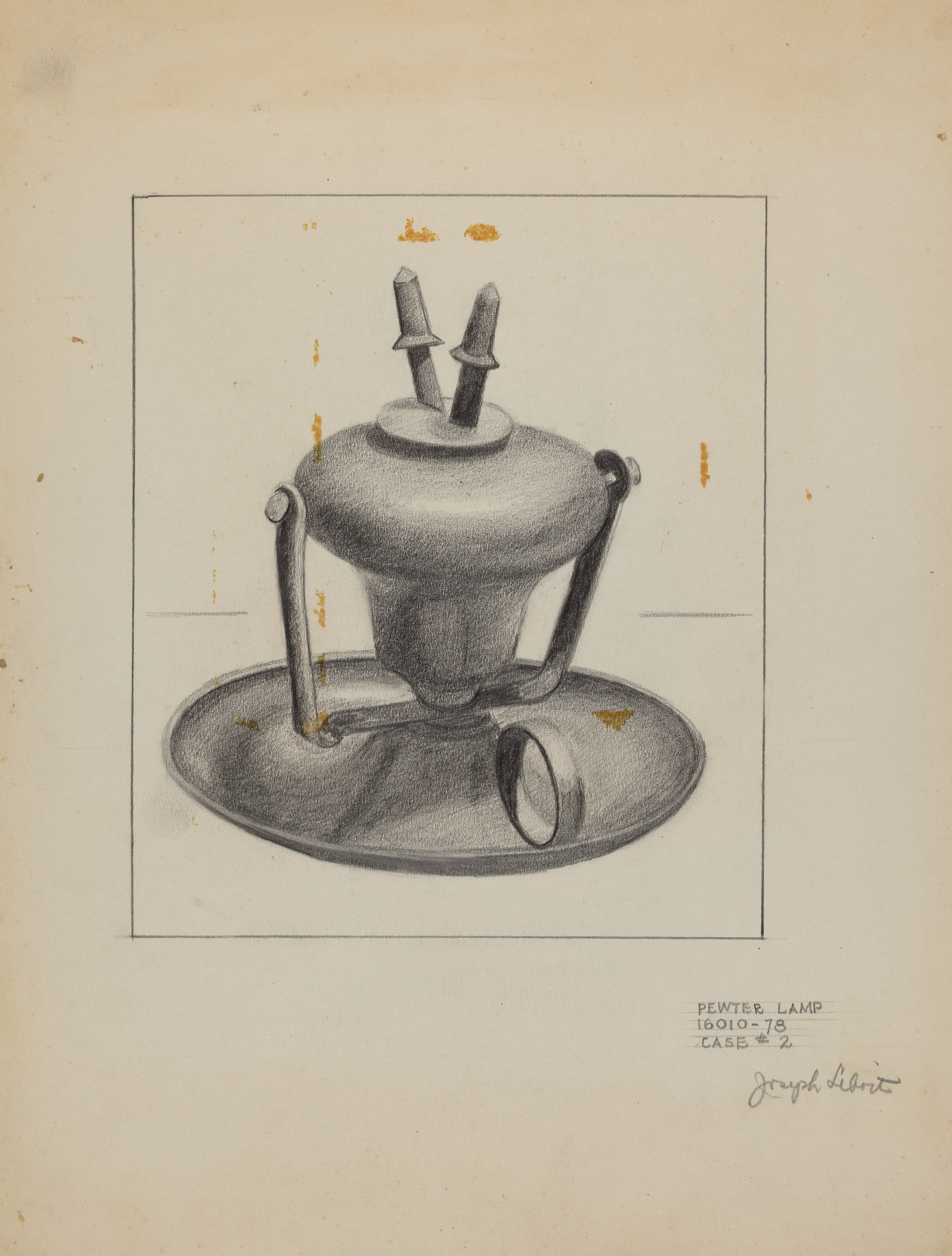
Lamp, one of Leboit's drawings for the Index of American Design

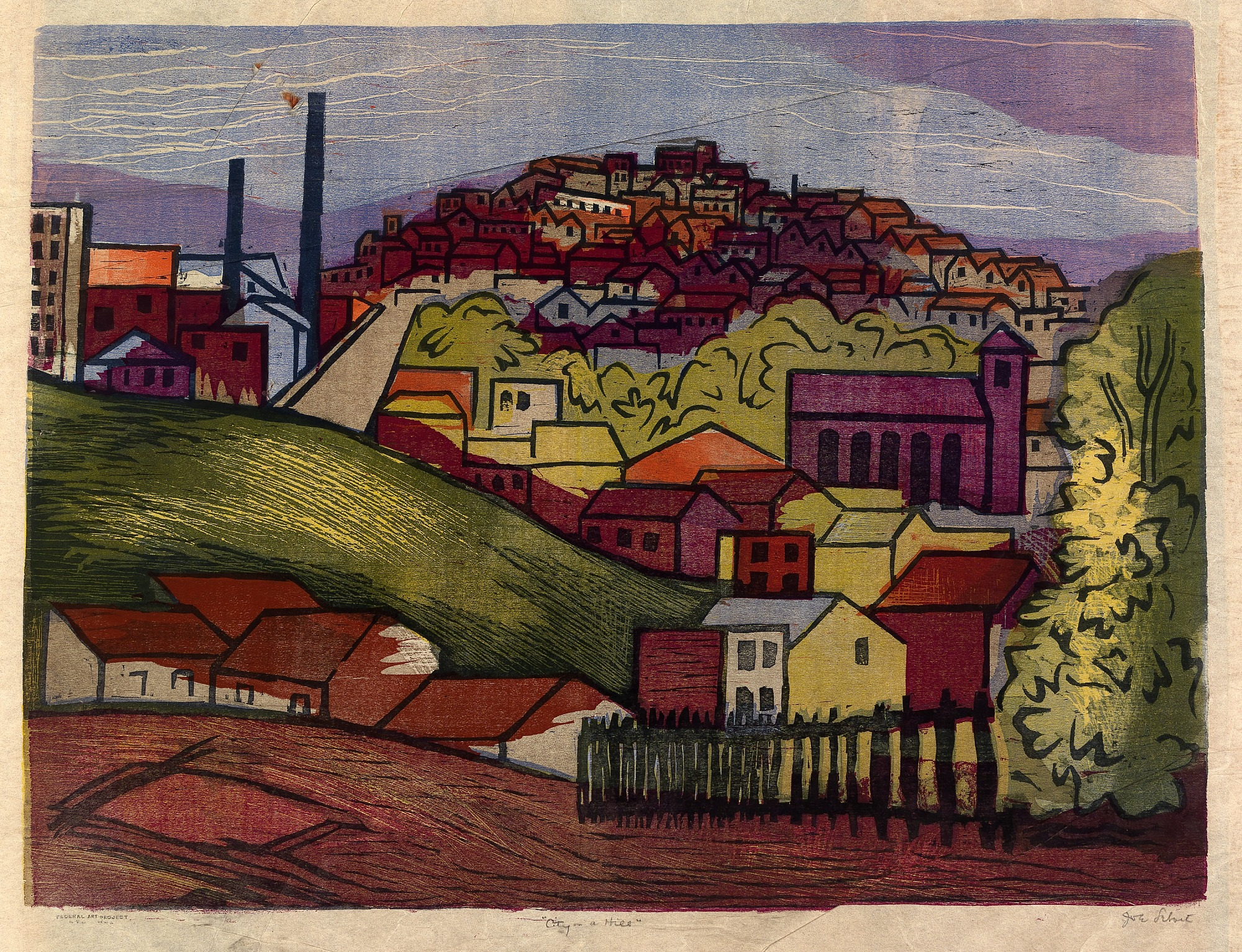
City on a Hill, woodcut for the Federal Art Project in New York City

In the mid 1930s, Joseph Lebowitz changed his last name to Leboit; whether this was to avoid anti-semitism, or to capitalize on interest in French artists is not known. He developed skills as a draftsman, printer's devil and lithographer. He was drawn to graphic arts, which he believed to be more democratic than painting, as works could be widely disseminated and inexpensive. In 1935 he joined the Graphic Arts Division of the Federal Art Project. Under these auspices he produced about 25 lithographs, etchings and woodcuts, some in the style of social realism, others presenting urban life in New York City. He had an administrative role in the silkscreen unit under the direction of Anthony Velonis from 1938 on. Three serigraphs by Leboit appear in an article on the early history of that medium. In 1937 Leboit co-authored with Hyman Warsager an article in Art Front titled "The Graphic Project: Revival in Print Making".

During this time he married Lilian Moore, a teacher and children's author whose works include the Little Raccoon series, widely published in children's literature in the former Soviet Union.

=== World War II years ===
Tranquility (1936)

In the years before American entry into World War II, Leboit was struck by the irrelevance of esthetically driven art. His best known work, Tranquility (1936), depicts an artist wearing a gas mask, with two dogs at his feet, calmly completing a cubist painting while through a window, the viewer sees planes flying over the ruins of a town. This work was included in the exhibit "Facing Fascism" at the Museum of the City of New York in 2007 and in the exhibition ‘The American Scene: Prints from Hopper to Pollock’ at the British Museum in 2008. Tranquility was cited by museum director Neil MacGregor as ‘as well as referencing the great names and artistic currents it allows you to read a whole other set of narratives about the history of twentieth-century America.’. However, the critic Robert Hughes grouped Tranquility with many of the prints from the exhibit as overly literary and lacking in artistic skill, calling it "indignantly quaint in a cartoony way." Continuing his engagement in leftist politics, Leboit was involved, in 1942 in the foundation of the Artists' League of America and in that of Artists for Victory. The latter organization eventually enrolled over 10,000 artists, and held exhibits at the Metropolitan Museum of Art and at military hospitals in support of the United States effort in World War II. Part of the program of the organization was advocacy of the Western allies opening a second front to relieve pressure on the Soviet Union. As head of the Graphic Arts committee for Artists for Victory, Leboit organized the exhibit "America in the War", which opened in 26 American museums on October 20, 1943. His woodcut, Herrenvolk currently in the collections of the Art Institute of Chicago and of the Library of Congress was entered in the section of the exhibit called "The Nature of the Enemy" and depicts two Nazi soldiers eating and drinking next to the corpse of a woman.

While not a member of the Communist Party of the United States, Leboit knew many of its leaders, and was sympathetic to their views. His illustrations appeared in the communist periodical New Masses and in Art Front. During the war, he was also employed as a staff artist for the left-leaning evening newspaper PM, contributing cartoons, sketches and maps. Among other artists at PM at the time were Theodor Geisel, later known as Dr. Seuss and Ad Reinhardt, one of the founding Abstract Expressionists. Leboit also exhibited at the ACA gallery in New York City around this time.

He participated in the Index of American Design, which can be found at the National Gallery of Art in Washington, DC. See his artist page on the NGA website.

=== Later life ===
Following the end of the war, employment became increasingly difficult for those with Communist affiliations, and Leboit, rather than undergo the background checks attendant on being a staff artist in mainstream media, retrained as a psychologist and psychoanalyst. He co-founded the Jamaica Center for Psychotherapy, later called the Advanced Center for Psychotherapy in New York City, under the precept that psychoanalytic psychotherapy should be available to the working class. He edited one of the first books on borderline personality disorder during this period. He served as Executive Director for almost 25 years, retiring after a stroke at age 81. During this period, and even after the stroke he continued to paint, but he never went back to graphic arts.
