= Mary Stone =

Mary Stone may refer to:

- Mary Jean Stone (1853–1908), English historical writer
- Mary-Katherine Stone, American politician
- Mary Page Stone (1865–1912), Australian medical doctor
- Mary Perry Stone (1909–2007), American painter, sculptor, and muralist
- Mary Stone (doctor) (1873–1954), also known as Shi Meiyu, a Chinese medical doctor

== Fictional characters ==
- Maggie Stone, Mary Margaret Stone, in the US TV soap opera All My Children, played by Elizabeth Hendrickson
