= Maude Fiorentino-Valle =

Maude Fiorentino-Valle (1868–1969), was an American painter, teacher, musician, and poet. Her works are held by the National Gallery of Art and Denver Public Library Western Art Collection. A watercolor she created for the Index of American Design was exhibited at the Museum of Modern Art in 1936.
