= Suzanne Chapman =

American artist (1904–1990)

Suzanne Eugenie Chapman
- Born: 1904
- Died: 1990 (aged 85–86)

Suzanne Chapman, watercolor Crewel Embroidery (detail), 1935–1942, Index of American Design, National Gallery of Art, Washington, DC.

Suzanne Chapman (1904–1990) was an American artist known for her illustrations for the Index of American Design. These illustrations are part of the collection in the National Gallery of Art.

Chapman attended the Boston Museum School and began her career rendering images of various decorative objects in the collection of the Museum of Fine Arts, Boston.

Chapman is credited with developing a technique for creating meticulously rendered watercolors and drawings used in the Index. The technique was shared with hundreds of artists involved with creating the Index.
