= Owen Middleton =

American cartoonist and political activist (1888–1954)

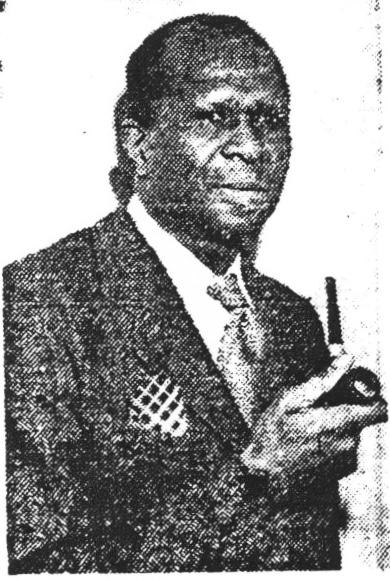
- Born: March 3, 1884
- Died: October 20, 1954 (aged 66); Brooklyn, New York
- Education: School of the Art Institute of Chicago
- Known for: Political cartoons

Owen Middleton (Owen Charles Middleton, 1888–1954) was an American cartoonist and political activist. In addition to his illustrations, he is notable for writing a letter from Sing Sing prison, published in 1933 by Will Durant as an appendix to On the Meaning of Life.

== Life and career ==
Born in 1888, Middleton was raised in Cleveland. He trained at the School of the Art Institute of Chicago and drew for the Chicago Tribune. Middleton was a conscientious objector during World War I and spent time in prison.

In 1939, Middleton briefly worked as an artist for the Federal Art Project in New York City drawing watercolor renderings for the Index of American Design, where he was photographed for the series “Garret to Gallery.” Three of Middleton's drawings are in the collection of the National Gallery of Art.

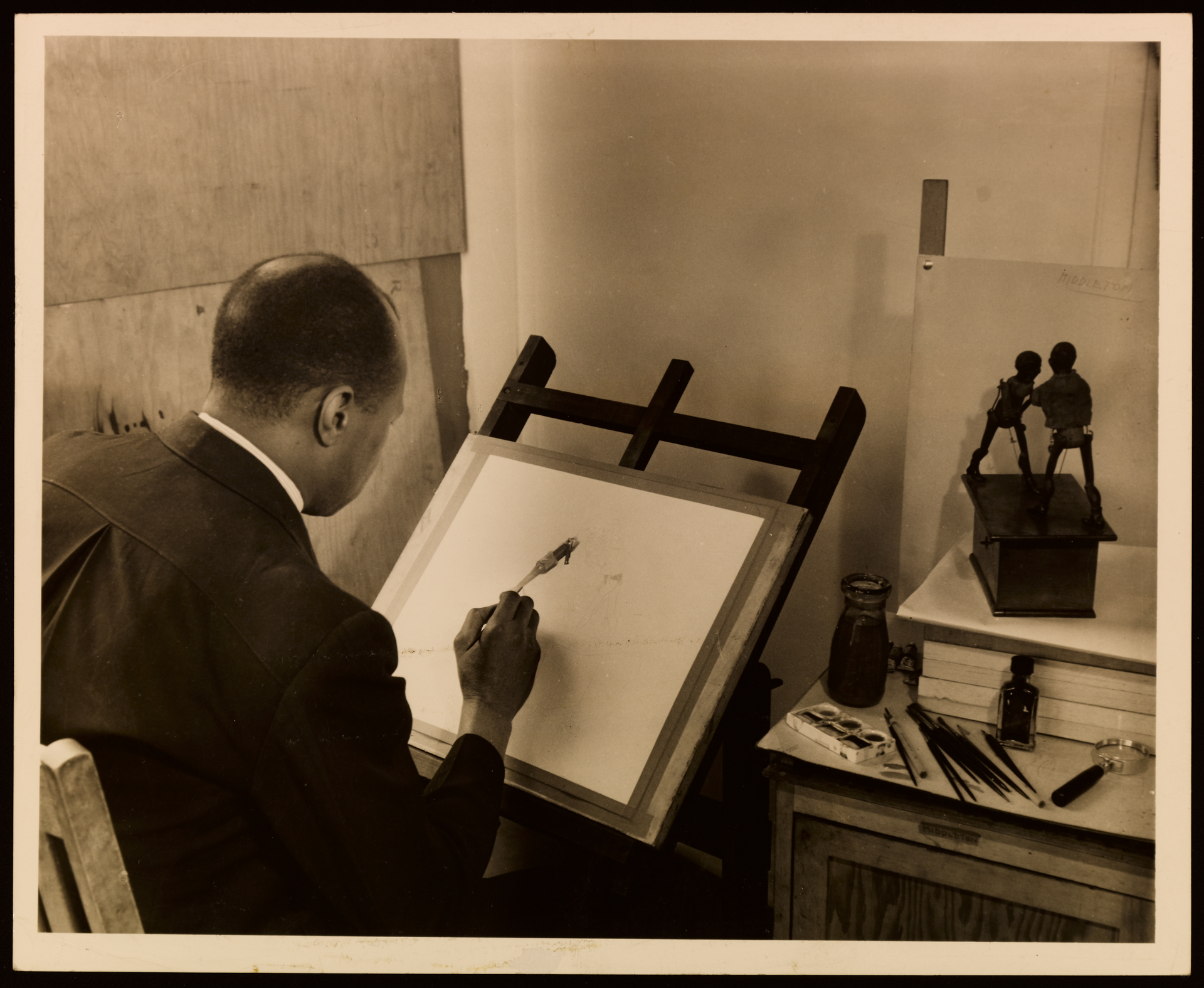
Owen Middleton works on a watercolor drawing for the Index of American Design, from Garret to Gallery.

Middleton contributed work to commercial comics in the early 1940s. His work in Spy Smasher and War Heroes was published by Fawcett Comics and Dell Publishing. Middleton also created his own comic strip Sergeant Joe that directly referenced current events, based on the life of boxer Joe Louis, which circulated in African American newspapers across the United States. He once said in a 1944 interview with Augusta Strong that “one political cartoon is worth one hundred editorials.”

Across his life and career Middleton advocated for labor unions and worker’s rights. In the 1920s he supported the Industrial Workers of the World. At the time of his death in 1954, Middleton was running for New York State Senate as an American Labor Party candidate for Brooklyn’s 11th District. Paul Robeson and William Howard Melish spoke at Middleton's funeral in Brooklyn.

== List of art exhibitions ==
- Black Pulp!

== Collections and archives ==
Middleton's work is held in the permanent collection of the National Gallery of Art in Washington DC.

An archive of Middleton's papers, the Owen Middleton papers, 1945-1953 Collection is held in the New York Public Library Archives and Manuscripts department.
