= Hyman J. Warsager =

American artist (1909–1974)

- Hyman J. Warsager at work
- Born: 1909; New York, New York
- Died: 1974 (aged 64–65); Slough, Berkshire, England, United Kingdom
- Known for: painter, printmaker

Hyman J. Warsager (1909–1974) was an American artist known for his printmaking.

== Biography ==
Warsager was born 23 June 1909 in New York City. He attended the Pratt Institute, the Grand Central School of Art, and the American Artists School. He worked for the Federal Art Project of the Works Progress Administration (WPA) creating prints. His work was included in the 1940 exhibition at the Museum of Modern Art entitled American Color Prints Under $10, which was aimed at bringing public attention to these “inexpensive but dynamic artworks”; the effort was reportedly successful. His work was also included in the 1944 Dallas Museum of Art exhibition of the National Serigraph Society. He died on 27 November 1974 at Slough, Berkshire, England, United Kingdom.

Warsager was among the ‘radical illustrators’ who contributed anti-lynching and antifascism images to leftist political magazines in the 1930s with the aim of increasing awareness of racial terrorism being committed across the country as well as the rise of fascism in Europe. His drawing The Law, which appeared in New Masses in 1934, "exemplified the joining of antiracist and antifascist references to critique. . social failures."

He illustrated the label of folk singer-songwriter Earl Hawley Robinson’s 1940 recording Earl Robinson: Songs for Americans, a 78 RPM 4-pocket album released in the U.S. Robinson was one of the "new folk" artists of the Public Works Administration (P.W.A.), a New Deal government agency (1933–39), and he wrote the songs Joe Hill, Black and White, and the cantata Ballad for Americans. His various songs were recorded by Paul Robeson, Lead Belly, Frank Sinatra, Bing Crosby, Odetta, Burl Ives, Three Dog Night, Sammy Davis Jr., Pete Seeger, and Joan Baez.

=== Federal Art Project – WPA ===
In the late 1930's Warsager was a member of the WPA team in New York City that experimented with silkscreen techniques. The team was led and inspired by Anthony Velonis. Warsager later recalled that "the establishment of the Graphic division of the WPA/FAP in that memorable fall of 1935 injected new hope in the artists and a new life into the print".

Art historian Helen Manga wrote in Radical Art: Printmaking and the Left in 1930's New York: “The credibility that printmaking gained through the establishment of the Federal Art Projects’s Graphic Arts Division. . . increased interest in viewing and collecting modern fine art prints in the second half of the decade (1930’s). The Graphic Arts Division was part of the Federal Art Project. … initiated in 1935 to promoted work relief for visual artists … enabling them to maintain and improve their professional skills … . It represented a visionary attempt to combine economic relief for creative artists with the cultural enrichment of the nation”.

About the original Federal Art Project team focused on silk screen printing, Manga wrote: "The team of six artists at the Graphic Arts Division who pioneered new screen-print technologies included Harry Gottlieb, Louis Lozowick, Eugene Morley, Elizabeth Olds, and Hyman Warsager. Harry Sternberg was also working independently on silkscreen printing with help from several other artists", including Ruth Chaney.

The early experimentation by Velonis in combination with the instructional booklet he wrote for the WPA and the WPA Federal Art Project team's collective efforts "would ultimately transform silkscreen printing from a commercial process to a fine-art medium".

Warsager and Velonis were longtime friends, collaborators, and later business partners. In an essay written in 1941, Carl Zigrosser, then curator of prints, drawings, and rare books at the Philadelphia Museum of Art, wrote: "Warsager has long been associated with Velonis; indeed he has shared a studio with him for the last few years and has also engaged in business with him under the name of Creative Printmakers Group".

=== Creative Printmakers Group ===
In 1939, Velonis, Warsager and other artists co-founded the Creative Printmakers Group in New York City. About this group, Sylvie Covey wrote in Modern Printmaking: A Guide to Traditional and Digital Techniques: "The group's shared screen-printing studio introduced the silkscreen process to many serious artists who went there to have editions printed. Vincent Longo worked as a colorist at Creative Printmakers Group, as did Jackson Pollock, and the print shop eventually became the most important silkscreen shop of the era. It was at about this time that the word serigraphy, which combines the Latin word seri ("silk") and the Greek word grapho ("to write"), first appeared. It was coined by Carl Zigrosser … to distinguish fine-art from commercial silkscreen"".

Warsager was acquainted with the French-American artist Louise Bourgeois when they were both in their late twenties in New York City. In June of 1939, Bourgeois visited him at the studio of Creative Printmakers Group in Manhattan. Later that summer, during her trip to Paris, Bourgeois sent him a hand-written letter about organizing an exhibition with André Lurçat, the French architect, urban planner and painter, at Maison de la Culture in Paris, where Lurçat was also the manager. She wrote: “I have shown him [Lurçat] your three prints and some work by Ruth Chaney and some by Will Barnet. He likes them very much”.

=== National Serigraph Society ===
Warsager, Velonis, Joseph LeBoit, Max Arthur Cohn and several other artists founded the National Serigraph Society in 1940, which held exhibits, operated a gallery, and published a newsletter. The Society was called a "major force in the development of serigraphy as a fine art. . .(that) set standards of excellence and has sent hundreds of exhibitions of its members' work to countries all over the world" in Silk-Screen Printing for Artists & Craftsmen (1970) by Mathilda V. and James A. Schwalbach. The authors added that the exhibitions were responsible for a good deal of museum interest in the purchase of original prints as part of museum collections. The organization was described as "a source of inspiration, a clearing house, and temple of artist and print makers everywhere" in Silk Screen Techniques by J.I. Biegeleisen and Max Arthur Cohn, who noted that it was largely responsible for the effective promotion of serigraphy, raising it to the level of a museum art form. The Society's "active program of traveling exhibits, lectures, and portfolios of prints helped to sustain and broaden interest in the serigraph".

The Dallas Museum of Art held several exhibits of the work of the National serigraph Society members in 1944, 1947, and 1951

=== Service in U.S. Army Air Forces Silk Screen Unit ===
Warsager served in the U.S. Army Air Forces' Western Technical Training Command (AAFWTTC) in Denver, CO from 1942 to 1945, where he taught aerial photography in the U.S. Army Air Forces School. Based on his art training and experience, Warsager was assigned to head a new Silk Screen Unit for the design and production of color posters on various subjects that the Command wished to publicize. The commanding general of the AAFWTTC, Major General John F. Curry, wrote in a November 1943 commendation: “I wish to commend the Silk Screen Unit of the Reproduction Division at Lowry Field for the intelligence, imagination and originality displayed in designing and executing the posters requested by this headquarters for distribution to the various stations of this command. … The (Silk Screen) unit. . .has successfully been engaged in producing posters which have been accorded high praise from many sources. I particularly desire to commend … . Staff Sergeant Hyman J. Warsager for setting up the unit and for executing and directing the production of the posters. . .”.

Warsager and fellow artists in the unit designed and created a mural in the map room of the Operations Building at Lowry Field, at the suggestion of Brig. Gen. Albert L. Sneed, to "make Lowry one of the most talked of stations among pilots on the Chicago to San Francisco airway."

Anthony Velonis also served in this military Silk Screen Unit after Warsager requested that the Army Air Forces assign Velonis to the unit, based on Velonis' strong technical screen printing skills and expertise.

=== Ceraglass – decorative glassware company ===
In 1940 Warsager and Velonis started a commercial company by building on their screen printing skills and experience. They called the company Ceraglass, with ‘cera’ referring to ceramic. The business had its beginnings in a chance encounter, as noted in various sources. Ceraglass evolved from their previous endeavor, Creative Printmakers Group, which they had started with several other artists. Along with the work of numerous artists, Creative Printmakers printed holiday cards for the Metropolitan Museum of Art. A cosmetics manufacturer spotted Warsager’s and Velonis' work and then visited them at the studio they shared, where he inquired whether the silk-screen process with which they were expert could be used on glass to produce an attractive bottle for a men’s shaving lotion. He persuaded them to decorate cosmetic containers.

Encouraged by the success of that side venture, Warsager and Velonis formed their own firm and later decorated containers for cosmetic manufacturers such as Elizabeth Arden, Dorothy Gray and Shulton. Eventually, Ceraglass turned to creating decoration for glassware. By 1962 they led a team of seven artists and designers and their team of skilled craftsmen. The company employed a hundred and fifty skilled and semiskilled employees, most of whom had been trained on-the-job. By the mid-1960’s the company had outgrown its multiple loft sites in New York City and moved to progressively larger spaces. By 1965 Ceraglass and its affiliated company Ceragraphic occupied 56,000 square feet of factory and design space in Hackensack, NJ.

Velonis and Warsager operated Ceraglass and Ceragraphic until they sold the firms to VCA Corporation in 1969. Warsager stayed for several more years as Chief Executive Officer. He held several U.S. patents on glassware designs. Velonis held patents on innovative processes involved in their manufacturing process; in addition to being an artist, Velonis was technically skilled and developed many of the paints and techniques used in their production processes.

The Museum of American Glass in West Virginia holds numerous glassware items in its collection that were designed and produced by Ceragraphic and Ceraglass.

== Gallery ==
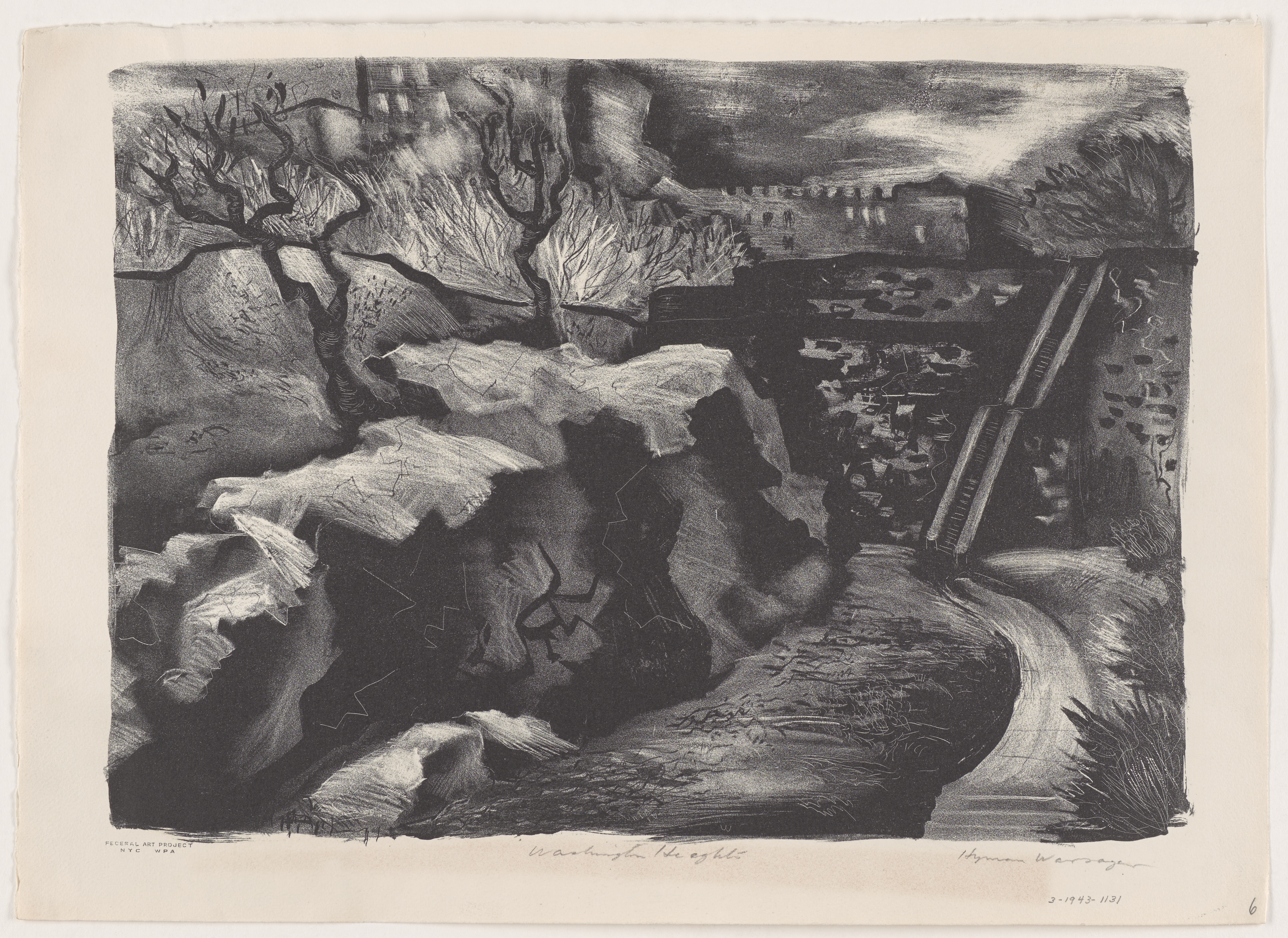
Washington Heights, c. 1937, lithograph

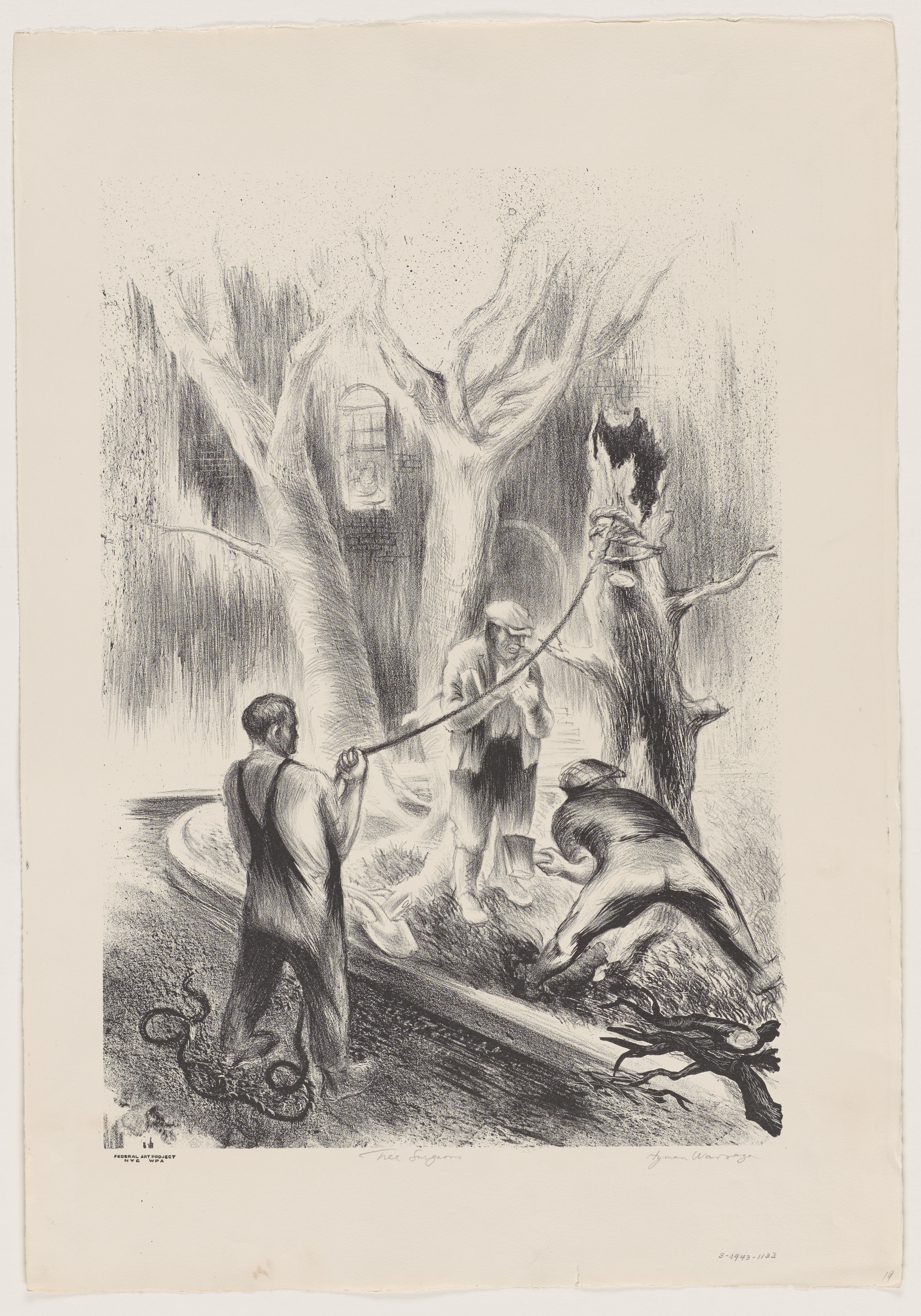
Tree Surgeons, c. 1939, lithograph

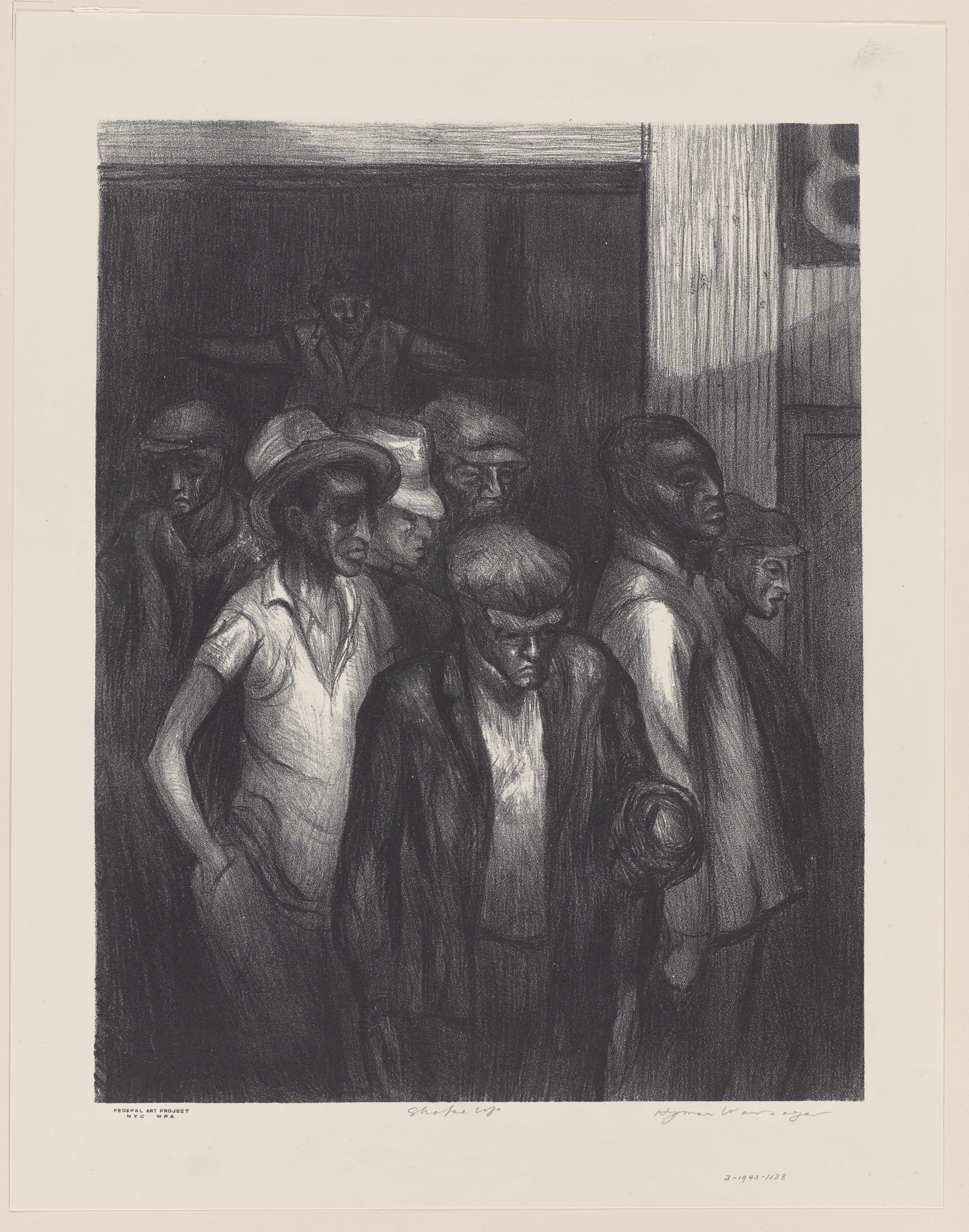
Shape Up, c. 1938, lithograph

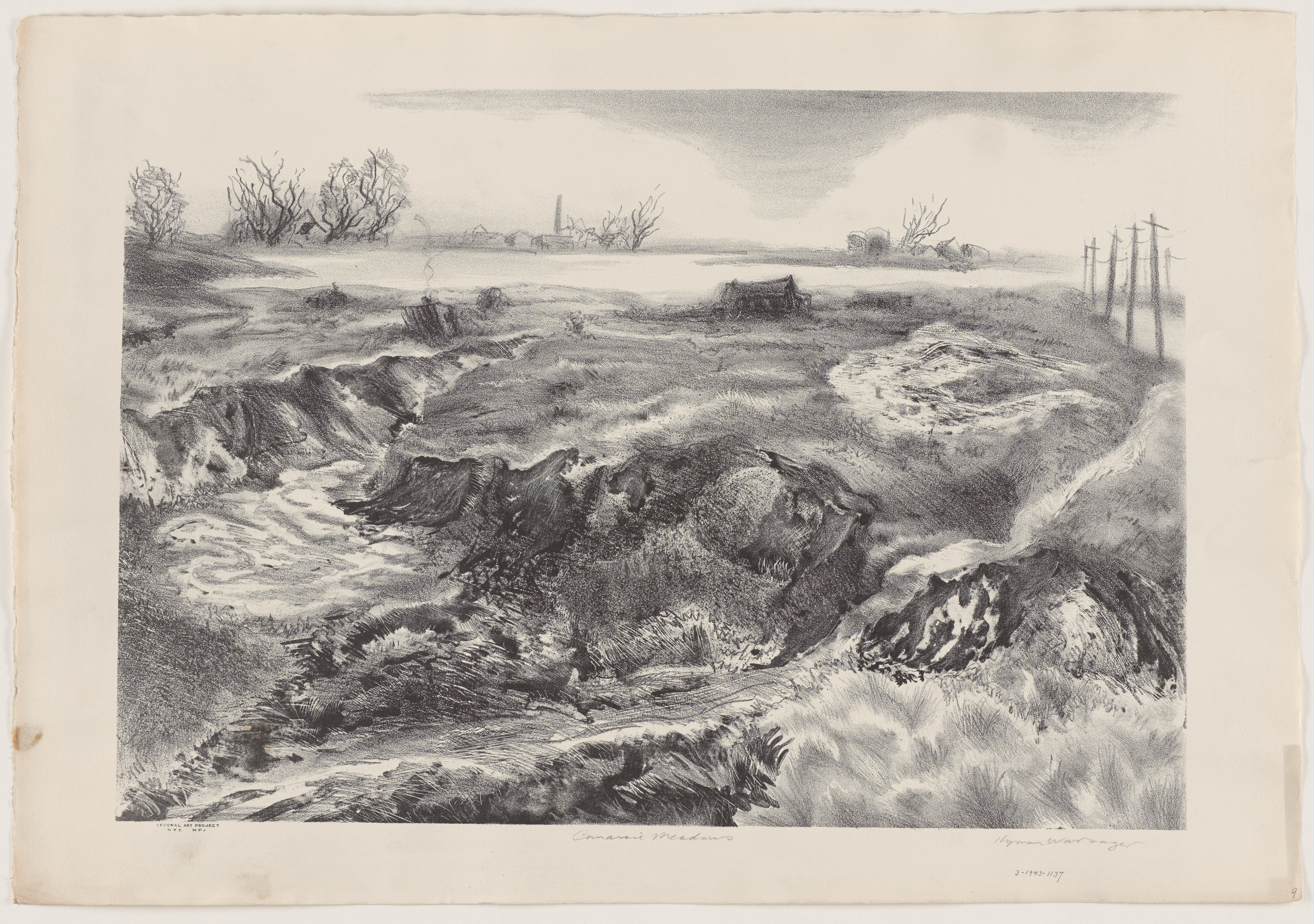
Canarsie Meadows, c. 1937, lithograph

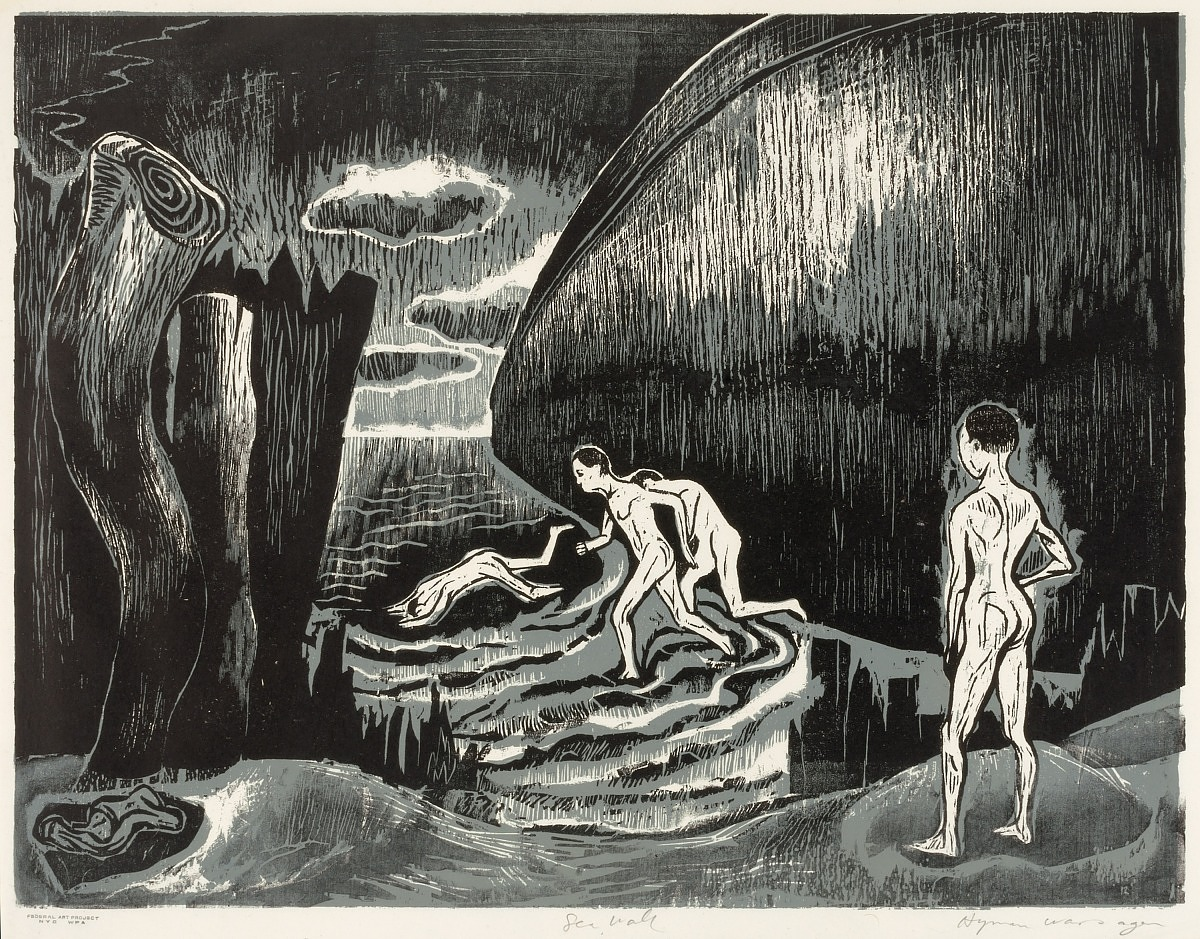
Sea Wall, Nd., color woodcut

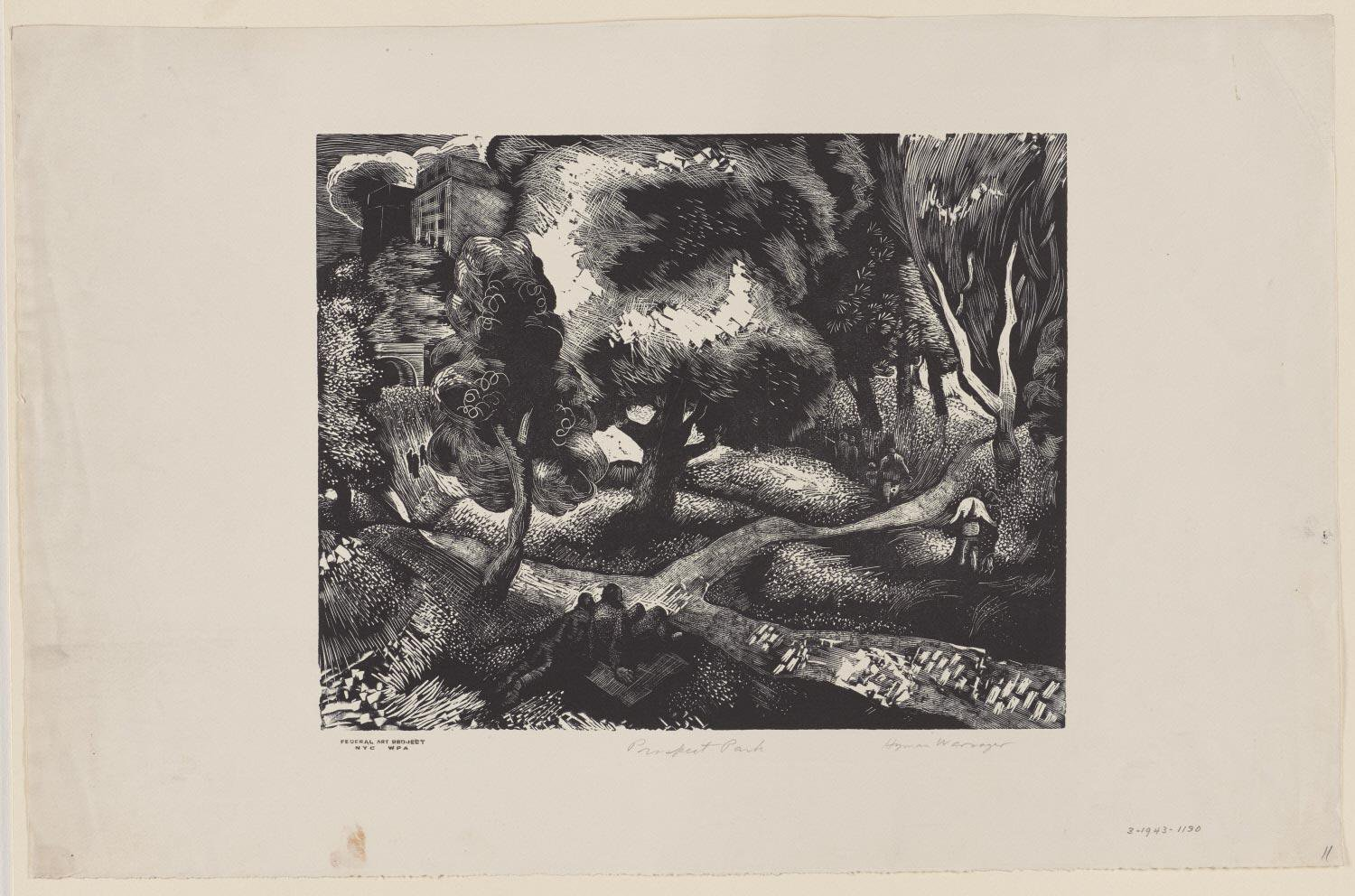
Prospect Park, c. 1938, wood engraving

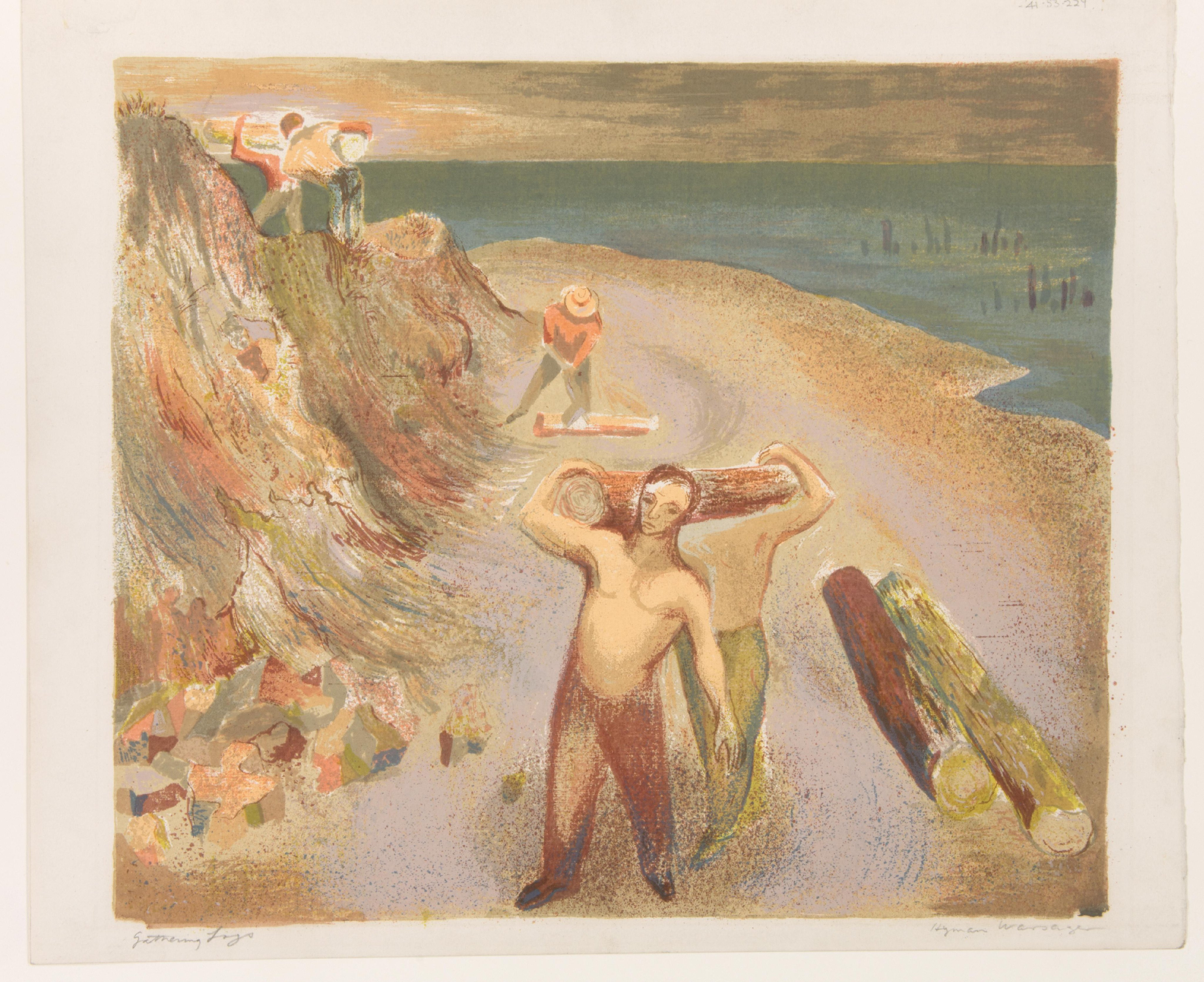
Gathering Logs, c. 1939, color screenprint

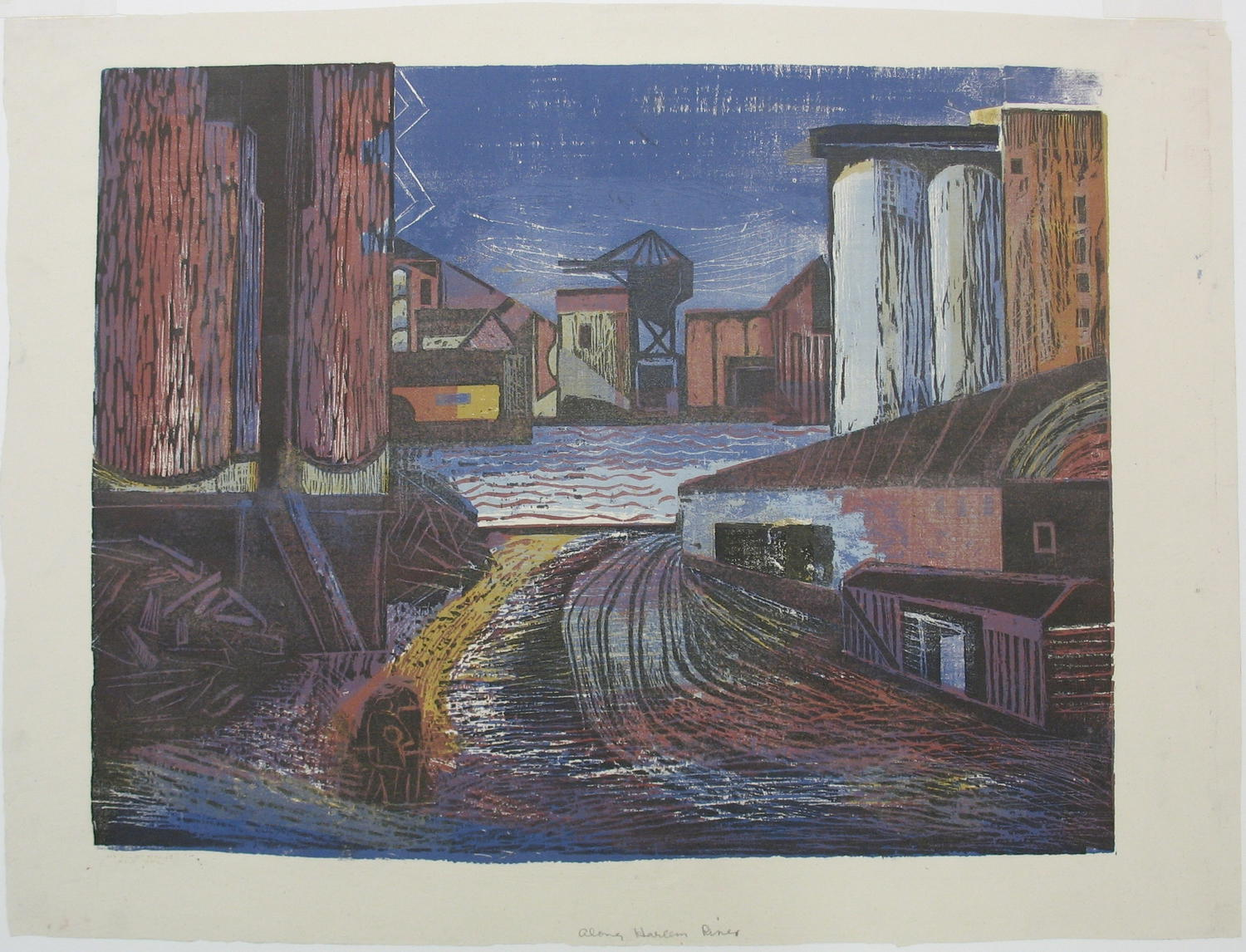
Along the Harlem River, c. 1938, color woodcut

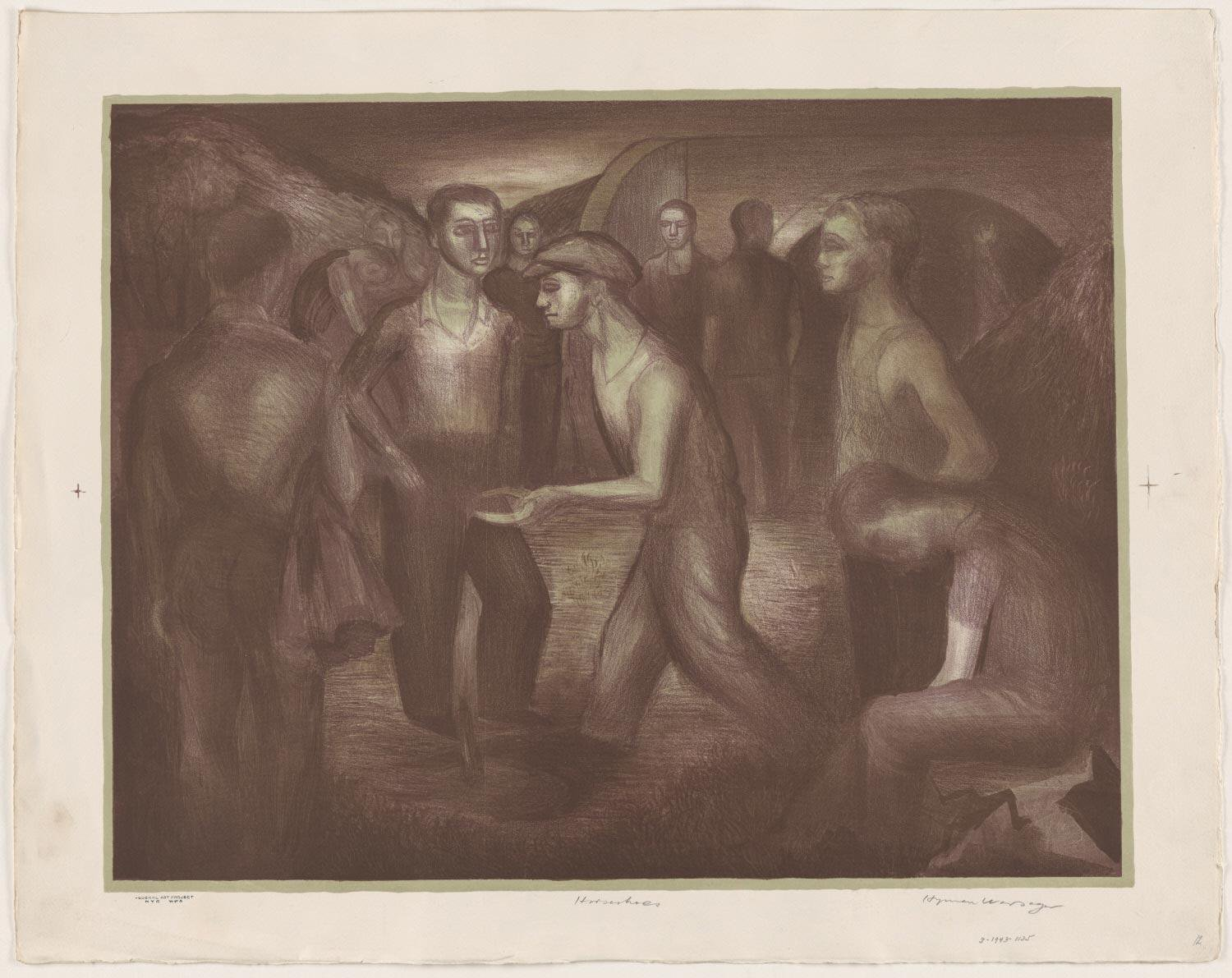
Horshoes, c. 1938, color lithograph

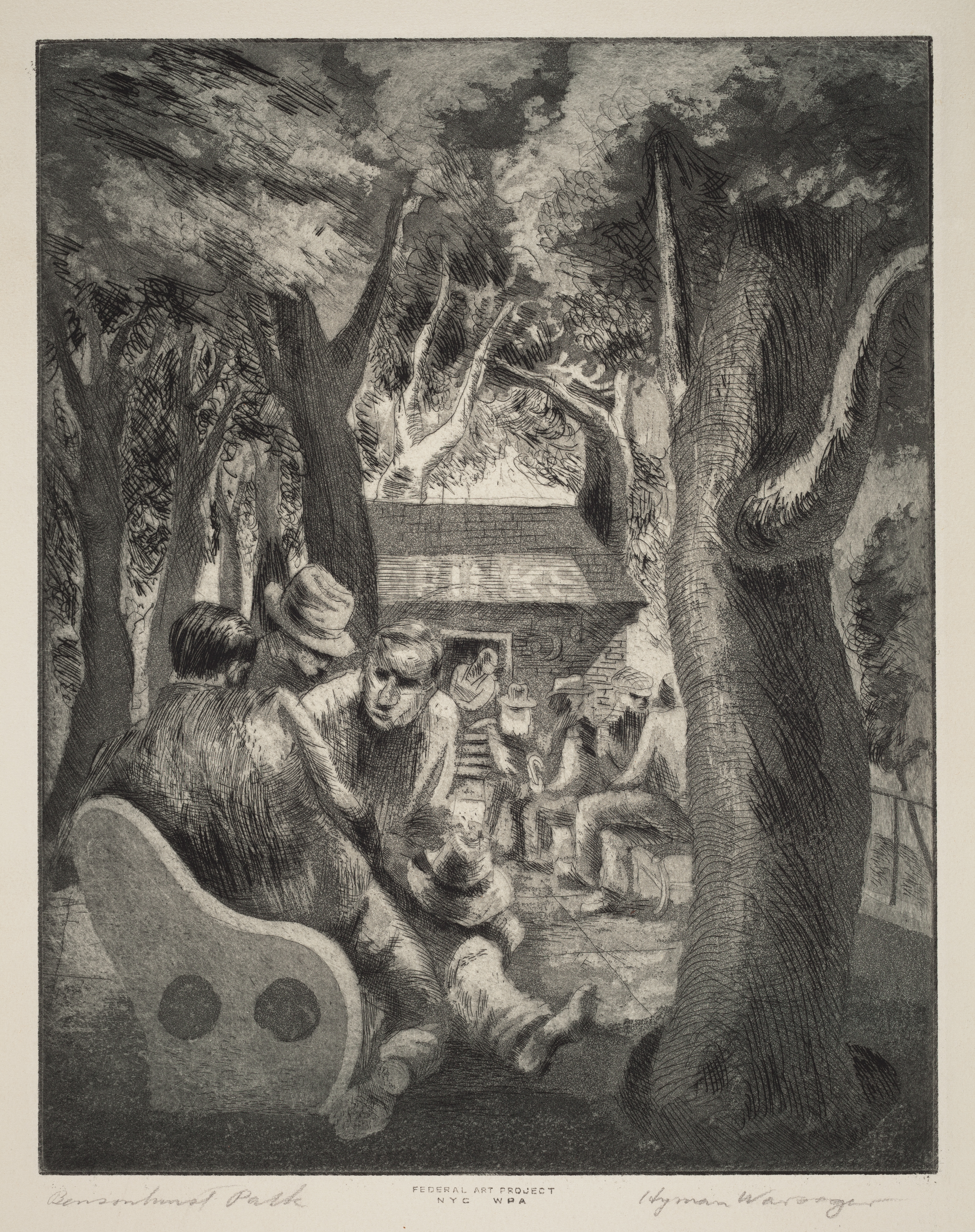
Bensonhurst Park, c. 1935-1943, etching

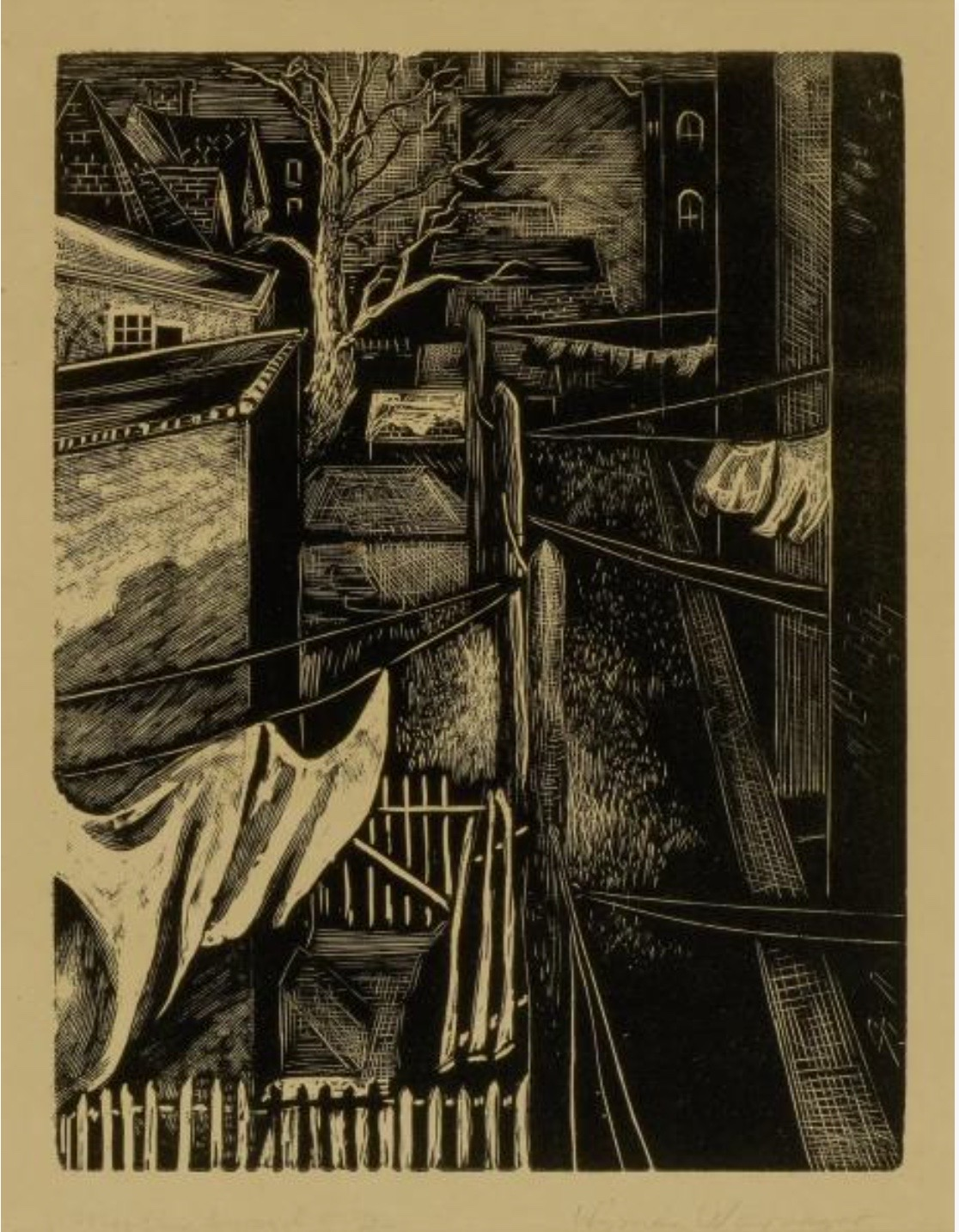
My Backyard 2, c. 1938, linoleum cut

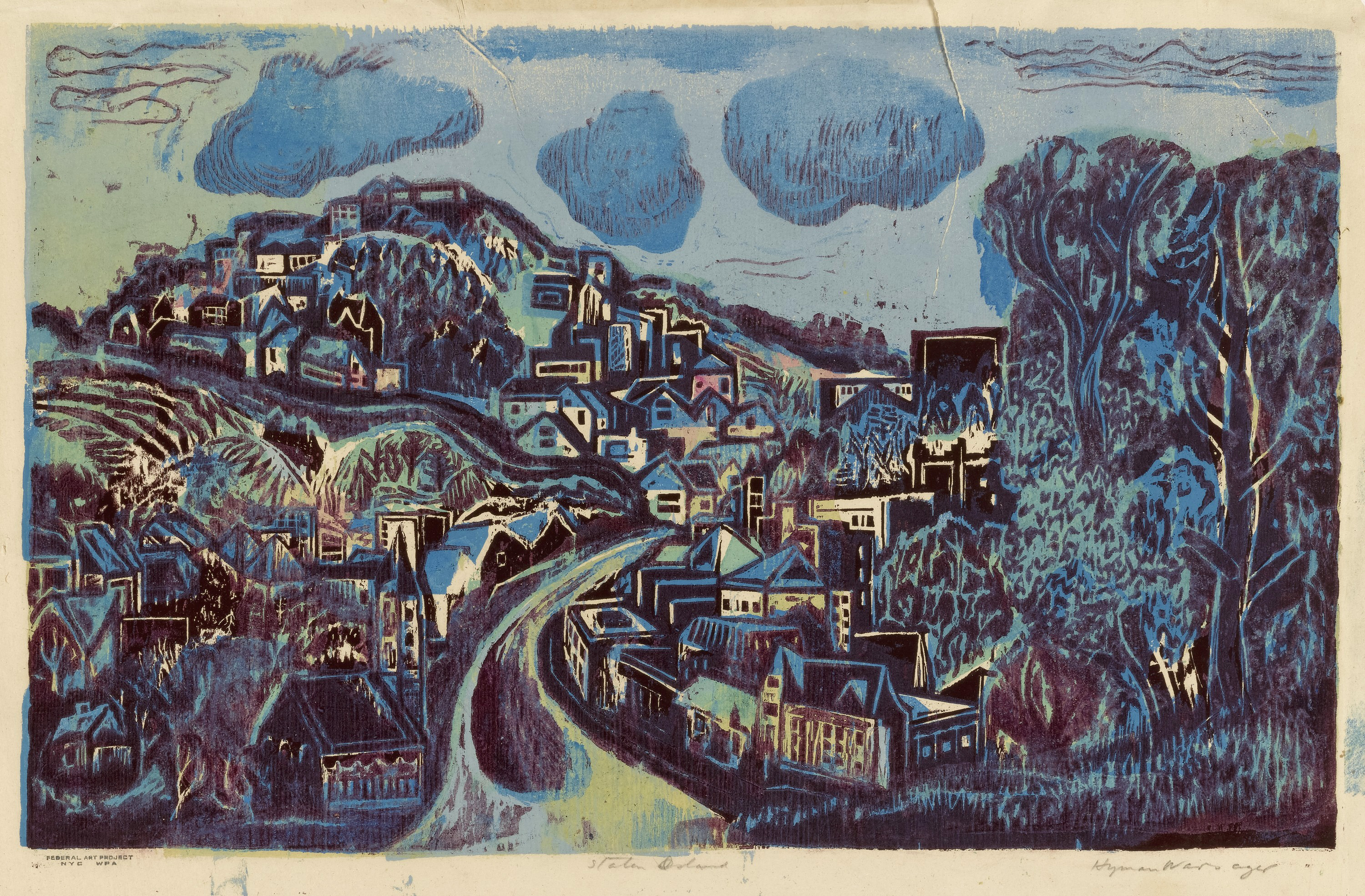
Staten Island, ca. 1935-1943, color woodcut

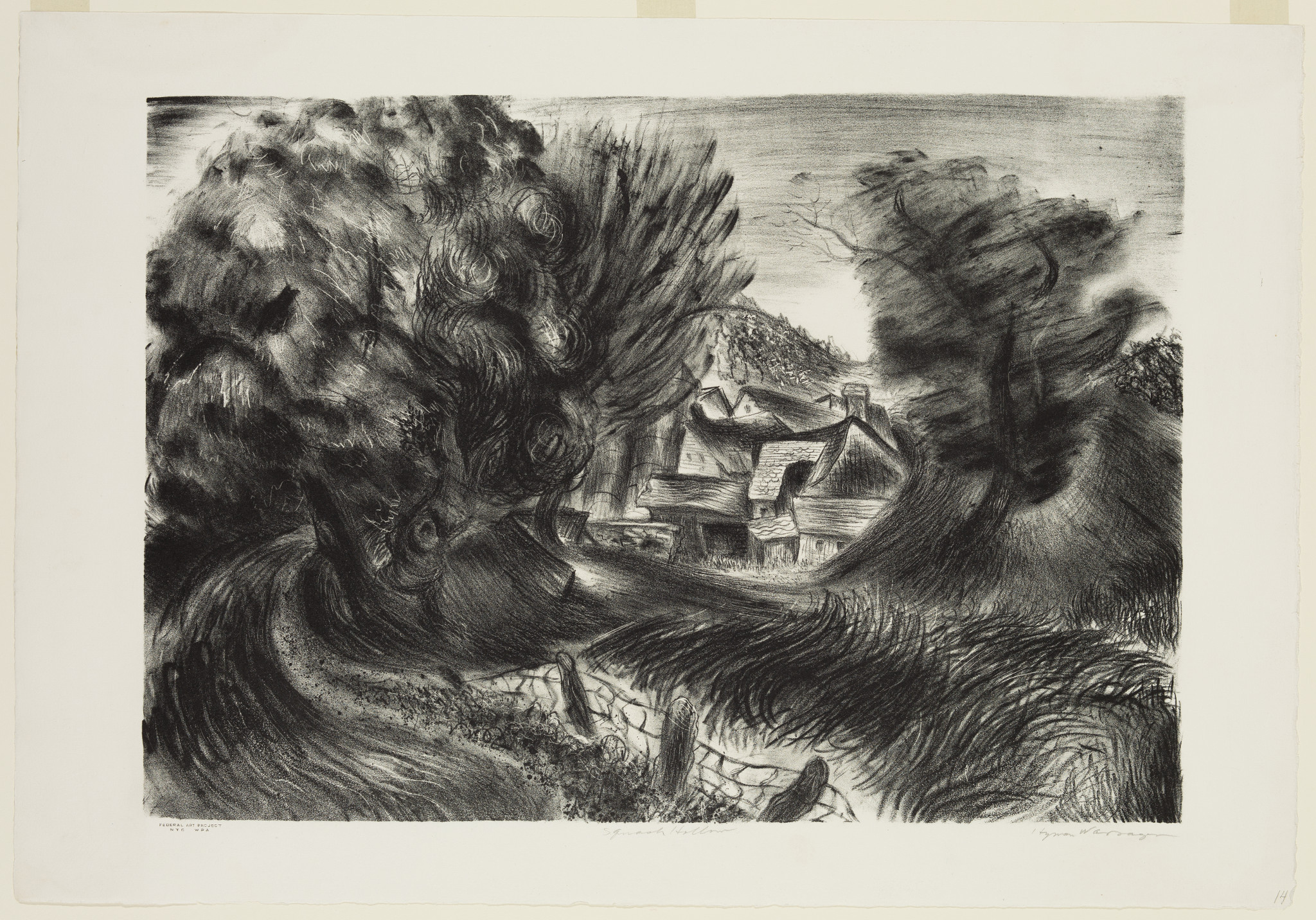
Squash Hollow, ca. 1934-1943, lithograph on paper

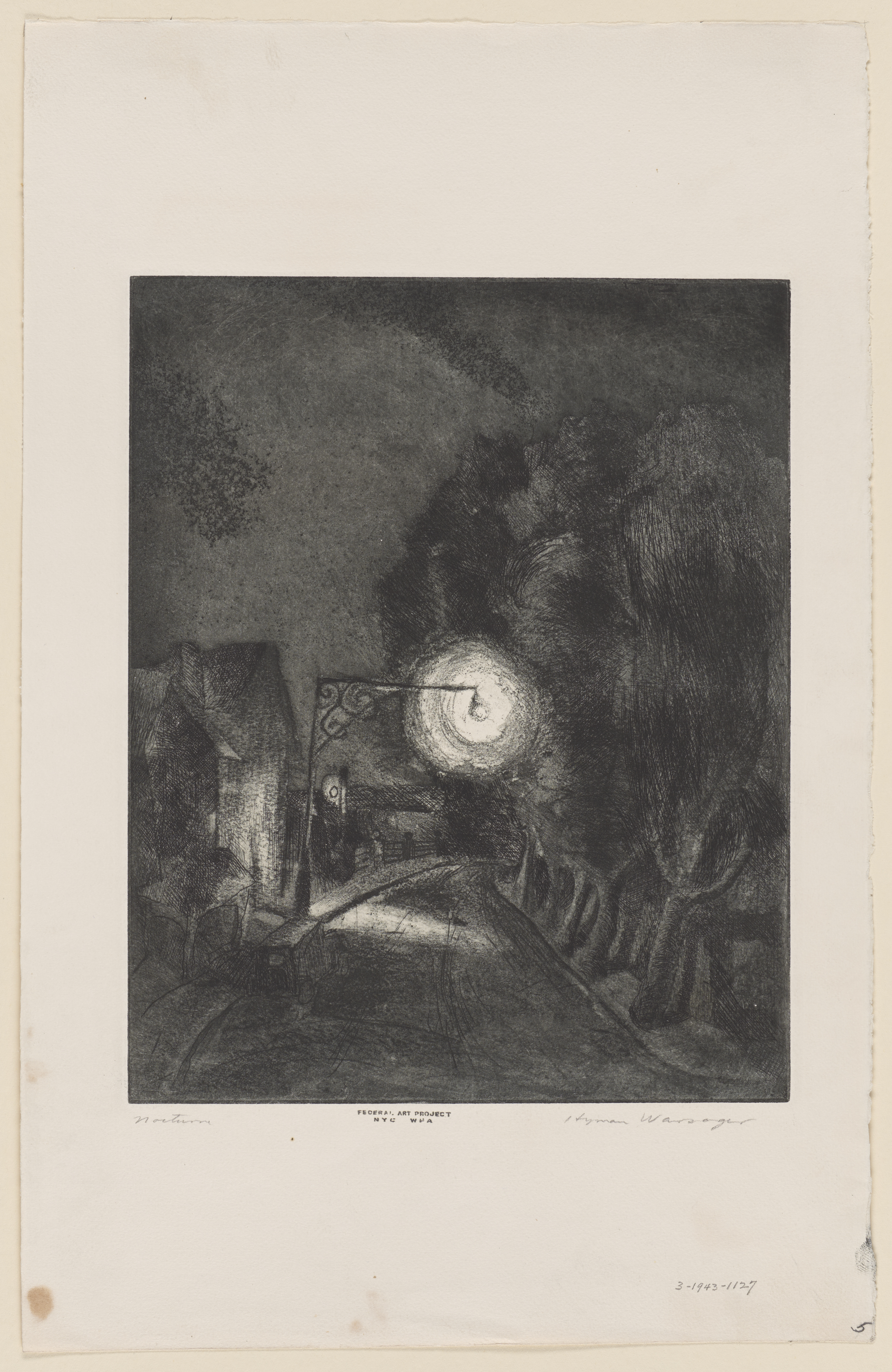
Nocturne, c. 1936, aquatint and etching

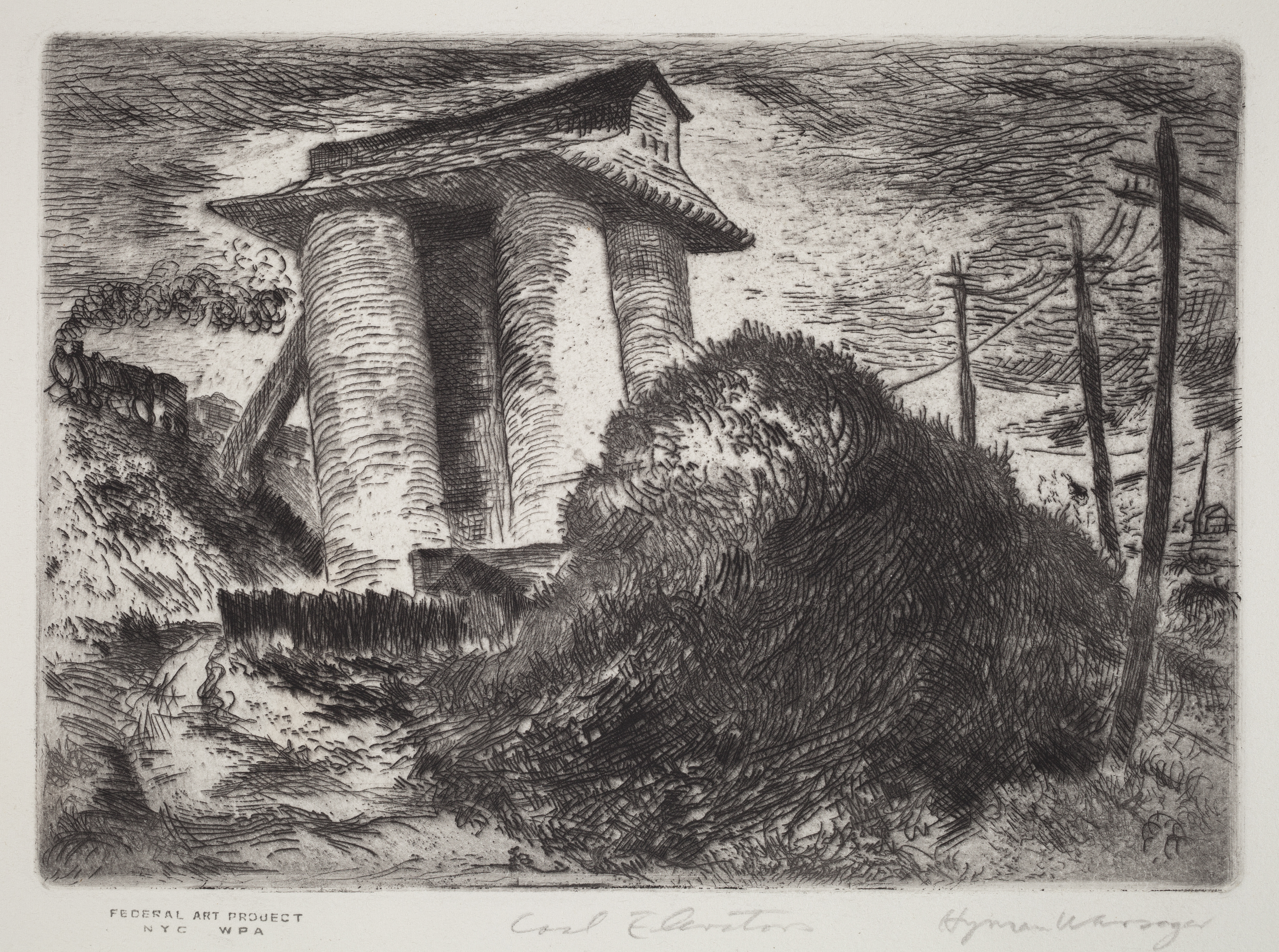
Coal Elevator, c. 1935-1943, etching

== Selected group exhibitions ==
- 1937 National Exhibition, International Art Center, New York, Master Institute of United Arts, Prints for the People, Federal Art Project – Works Progress Administration, Jan. 4–31
- 1938 Brooklyn Museum, Color Prints by Four W.P.A. Artists (Russell Limbach, Augustus Peck, Louis Schanker, Hyman Warsager), May 27 – Sept. 5
- 1939 The Berkshire Museum, Pittsfield, MA.,The World of Today, organized by Elizabeth McCausland, July 26 – August 16
- 1940 Springfield Museum of Art, organized by Elizabeth McCausland for The Silkscreen Group (later re-named the National Serigraph Society).
- 1940 Brooklyn Museum, Silk Screen Process Prints. Sept. 20 – Oct. 20
- 1940 New York State Museum, Albany, N.Y., Silk Screen Exhibit
- 1940 Museum of Modern Art, American Color Prints Under $10, Nov. 25 – Dec. 24
- 1940 Whitney Museum of American Art, Annual Exhibition of Contemporary American Art – Sculpture, Paintings, Watercolors, Drawings, Prints. Jan. 10 – Feb. 18
- 1941 Whitney Museum of American Art, Annual Exhibition of Contemporary American Sculpture, Watercolors, Drawings and Prints. Jan. 15 – Feb. 19
- 1942 Whitney Museum of American Art, Annual Exhibition of Contemporary American Art – Sculpture, Paintings, Watercolors, Drawings and Prints. Nov. 24, 1942 – Jan. 6, 1943
- 1942 The Metropolitan Museum of Art, Artists for Victory – An Exhibition of Contemporary American Art. June
- 1944 Santa Barbara Museum of Art, Serigraphs by Sergeant Hyman Warsager, December
- 1991 Boston Museum of Fine Arts, American Screenprints: 1930s–1960s. September
- 1996 The Metropolitan Museum of Art, W.P.A. Color Prints: Images from the Federal Art Project. March 5 – May 26
- 2001 Bruce Museum, Prints of American Life: WPA Works on Paper from the Webster Collection. Sept. 1 – Nov. 25
- 2011 Asheville Art Museum, Artists at Work: American Printmakers and the WPA. April 29 – Sept. 25
- 2016 Philadelphia Museum of Art, Breaking Ground: Printmaking in the U.S., 1940–1960. May
- 2017–2018 Zimmerli Art Museum, Rutgers, Serigraphy: The Rise of Screenprinting in America, Sept. 5 – Feb. 11
- 2023 Brooklyn College, A New Deal for Artists: Connecting Brooklyn College to Its Past, Present, and Future, New Deal Exhibit: Federal Art Project.

== Museums ==
Warsager's work is in the Art Institute of Chicago, the Baltimore Museum of Art, the Brooklyn Museum, the Detroit Institute of Arts, the Metropolitan Museum of Art, the National Gallery of Art, Philadelphia Museum of Art, the Smithsonian American Art Museum, the Victoria and Albert Museum, the University of Arizona Museum of Art, the University of Michigan Museum of Art, Blanton Museum of Art at the University of Texas at Austin, the Illinois State Museum, Krannert Art Museum, Weisman Art Museum, The Block Museum of Art at Northwestern University, Museum of Fine Arts Boston, the Harn Museum of Art at University of Florida, Davison Art Center at Wesleyan University, Yale University Art Gallery, Jordan Schnitzer Museum of Art at the University of Oregon, and the Whitney Museum of American Art.
