= Marguerite Carmel Wilson =

American artist (1893–1977)

- Born: Marguerite Carmel Becht; February 5, 1893
- Died: November 10, 1977 (aged 84)
- Other name: Carmel Wilson

Carmel Wilson, watercolor Silk Couch Cover, c. 1938, Index of American Design, National Gallery of Art, Washington, DC.

Marguerite Carmel Wilson (1893–1977) was an American artist.

Wilson née Becht was born on February 5, 1893 in New York. She attended the Pennsylvania Museum and School of Industrial Art Wilson is known for her illustrations for the Index of American Design. These illustrations are part of the collection in the National Gallery of Art. She died on November 10, 1977.
