= Juanita Donahoo =

American artist (1899-1990)

Juanita Amelia Donahoo
- Born: 1897
- Died: 1990 (aged 92–93)

Juanita Donahoo, Doorway, Stone, c. 1940, NGA 18139 (detail)

Juanita Donahoo (1899-1990) was an American watercolorist. Donahoo is known for her illustrations for the Index of American Design. These illustrations are part of the collection in the National Gallery of Art. She also collaborated with the Theosophist Dora van Gelder Kunz to create a series of aura portraits. in 2026 several of these portraits were exhibited in a solo exhibition entitled Colors of the Aura at the Bakersfield Museum of Art.
