= Lillian Mosseller =

American artist, rug maker (1915–2012)

- Born: Lillian Mills Smith; 1897; North Carolina, U.S.
- Died: 1992 (aged 94–95); Saluda, North Carolina, U.S.
- Occupations: Hooked rug master maker, visual artist, business owner
- Children: 4

Lillian Mosseller (1897 – 1992), also known as Lillian Mills Mosseller, was an American master rug maker and visual artist. She founded in 1926 the Mills–Mosseller Studio in North Carolina. During the Great Depression, Mosseller created watercolor drawings of hooked rugs for the Index of American Design, now in the collection of the National Gallery of Art in Washington, D.C.

Mosseller's son Ronald Mosseller used wool-weaving processes developed by Lillian, until the studio stopped production in the 2010s.

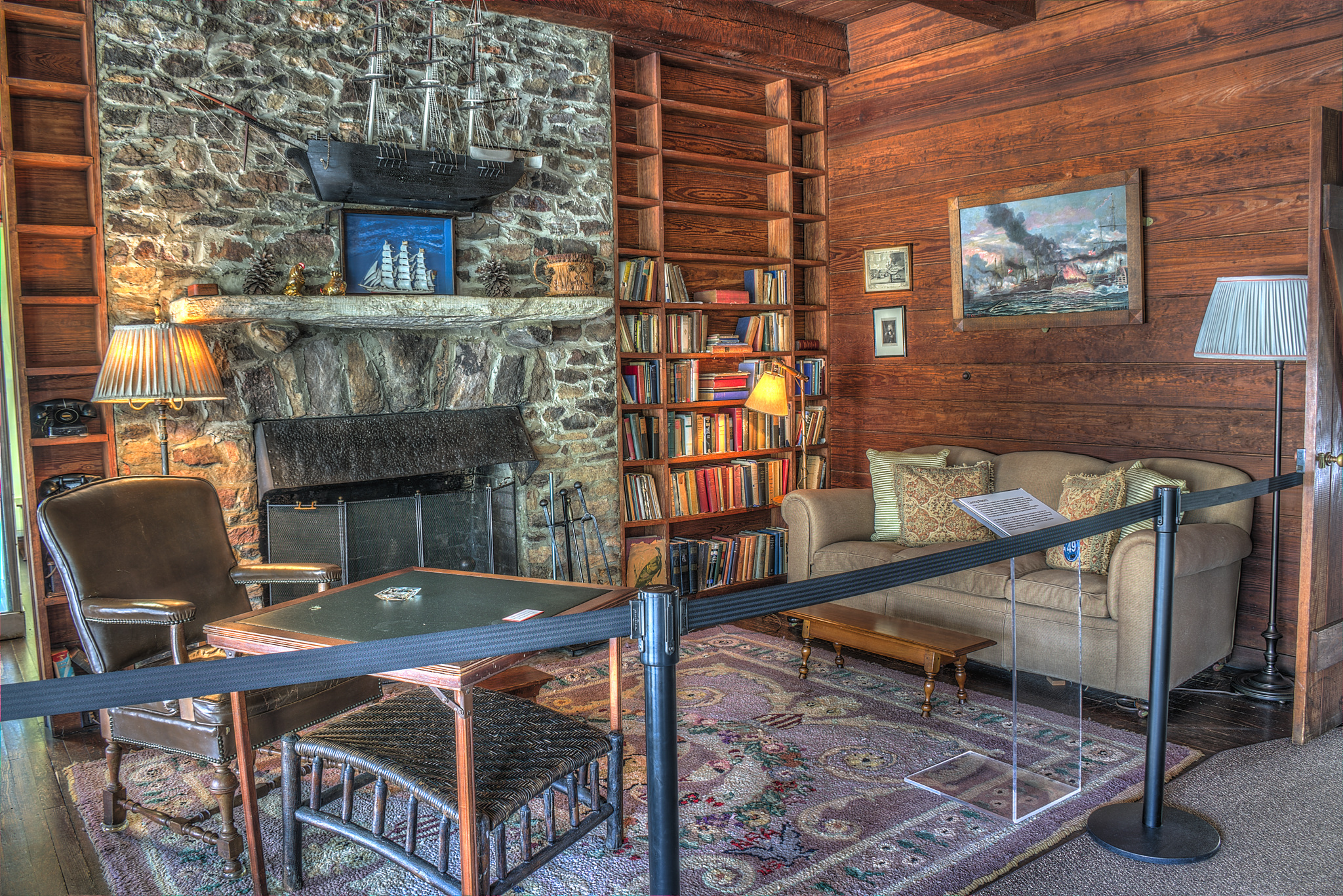
A hooked rug designed by Lillian Mosseller in the living room at Little White House, in the Warm Springs Historic District, Georgia

A 1933 newspaper reports that a hooked rug designed by Mosseller and created by her students was presented to U.S. president Franklin D. Roosevelt, which spells "New Deal" around its center. According to oral history, when Roosevelt suffered a fatal stroke at Warm Springs in 1945, he was seated on this rug.
