= Mary Perry Stone =

American artist (1909–2007)

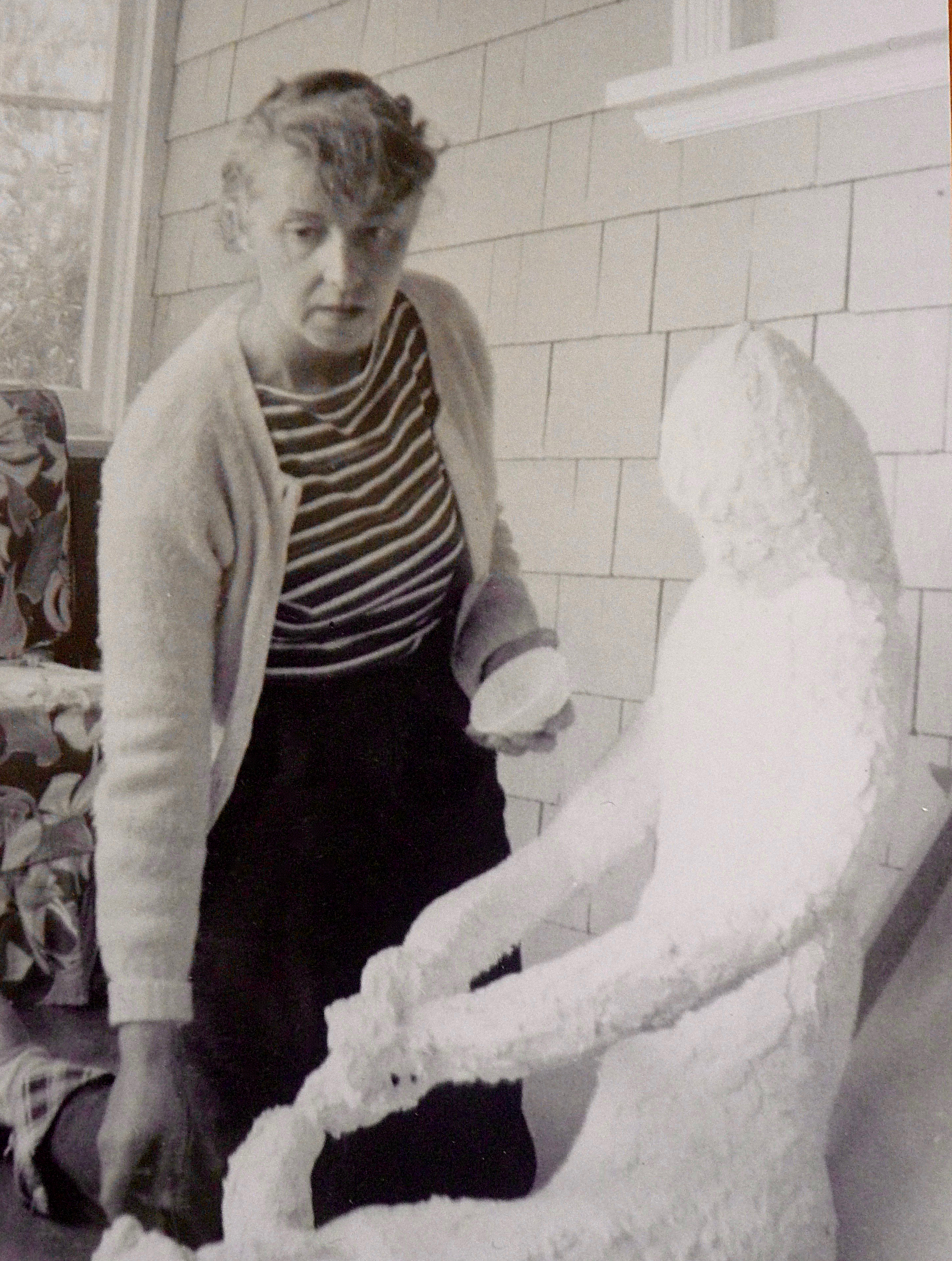
- Mary Perry Stone working in direct plaster, Sausalito, CA, 1958.
- Born: May 9, 1909; Jamestown, Rhode Island, U.S.
- Died: June 6, 2007 (aged 98); Ashland, Oregon, U.S.

Mary Perry Stone (May 9, 1909 – June 6, 2007) was an American painter, sculptor, and muralist. She is best known for her social protest artwork. Her archives are held in the Smithsonian's Archives of American Art.

== Early life and education ==
Mary Perry was born on May 9, 1909, in Jamestown, Rhode Island. At the age of 15, she went to New York City to study art at the Art Students League of New York. After high school, she completed her art training at Traphagen School of Fashion and Design in New York. At the same time, she studied sculpture at the New School for Social Research with sculptor Aaron J. Goodelman. Recalling this time in a taped interview for the Smithsonian Archives, she said she initially worked in clay, which would be cast into plaster, and that by the time she was 21, she had learned to carve marble and other stone. It was Goodelman who submitted Perry's sculpture of a dancer to an April 1934 Metropolitan Museum of Art layman exhibit. Her sculpture won an honorable mention.

== Early work ==
After graduating from Traphagen at the outset of the Great Depression, Perry stayed in New York. By 1930 she had become friends with Black dance pioneer Edna Guy, as she described in the sound recording held by the Smithsonian Archives. In April 1934, Perry designed the sets for Guy's performance with her ensemble at Carnegie Hall. In addition, Perry's watercolors were exhibited in the lobby during the performance. In 1935, she participated in a sculpture exhibition put on by the Artists Union, of which New Masses magazine said, “Particularly noticeable is the fact that more and more sculptors are turning to revolutionary subject matter.”

== Work for the New York Federal Art Project, 1937-41 ==
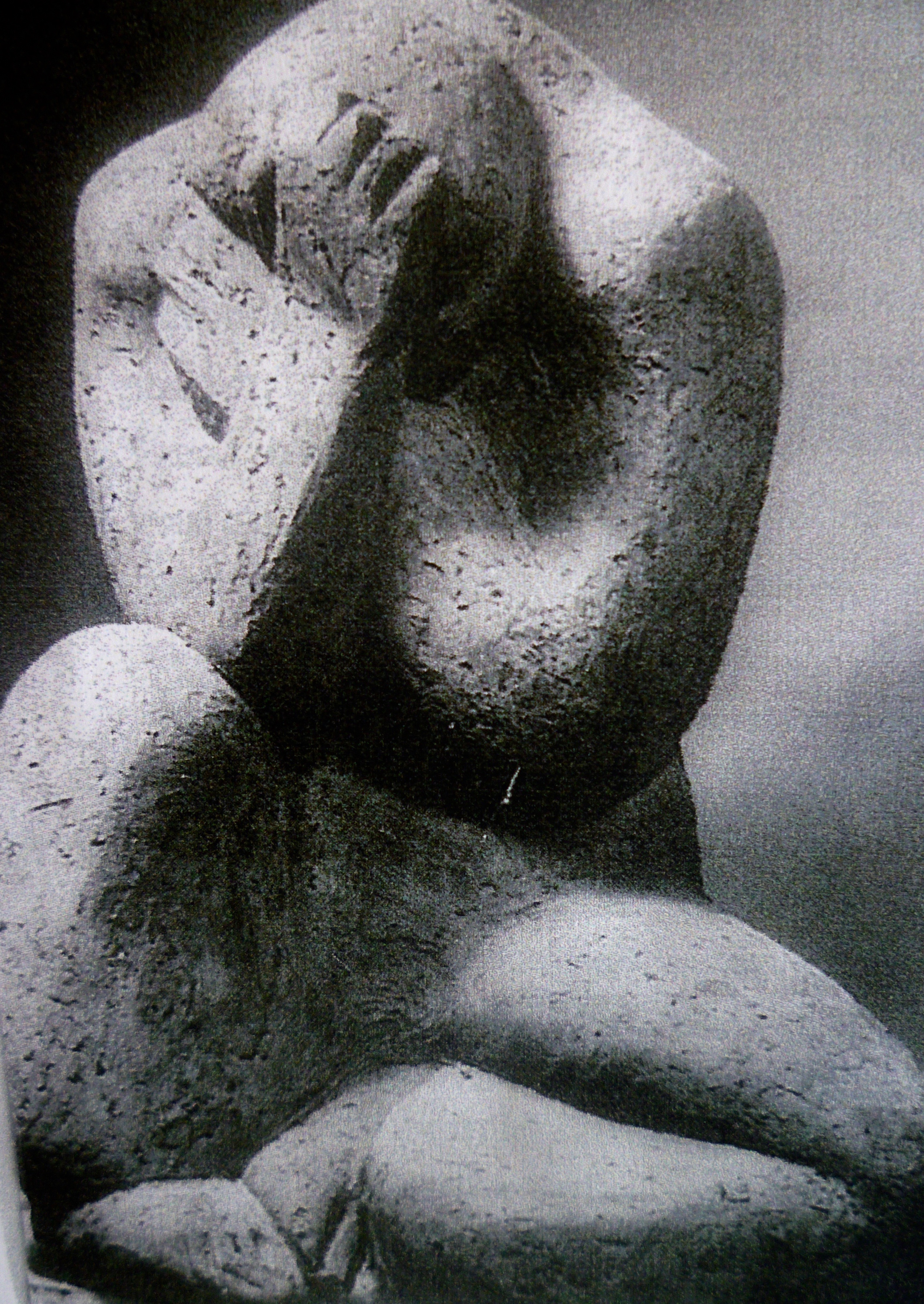
The Bowery, sculpted in direct plaster by Mary Perry Stone, 1939

To keep artists employed during the Great Depression, the Works Progress Administration (WPA) established the Federal Art Project (FAP) in 1935. The New York City Federal Art Project, a group within FAP, hired Perry in 1937, initially as an art teacher. She taught children sculpture in community centers in New York City including the Harlem Community Art Center and East Side House Settlement. Her supervisors at the Harlem Community Art Center included the teacher and sculptor Augusta Savage and the poet Gwendolyn Bennett.

After a year of teaching, Perry was transferred to the “Easel Division,” which paid artists a weekly wage to create paintings and sculpture. She was one of forty women sculptors in the New York Division. She sculpted in direct plaster as well as in stone, producing The Bowery and War. The 500-pound marble War was shown in the United American Sculptors First Annual Exhibition held at the New School For Social Research in 1939. Perry's oil painting “All for Money,” also created at this time, expressed her concern with fascism, racism, and the disparity between the rich and poor. These would remain themes of her work throughout her life. The painting was shown at the American Contemporary Art (ACA) Galleries in New York in 1939. In 1940, the Federal Art Project hired Perry to assist sculptor Cesare Stea in preparing his sculpture for installation at West Point. While working in New York, Perry became friends with artists including Peter Grippe, Joseph Wolins, and Francois H. Rubitschung.

Perry's time with the Federal Art Project ended in 1941. The project itself ended in 1943, and according to art historian Eleanor Carr, much of the free standing sculpture that had not been allocated to particular sites was warehoused, and with the termination of the WPA, it was destroyed. It was possibly thrown in the East River by order of an administrator. None of Perry's WPA sculptures remain.

== Personal life: New York ==
During World War II, Perry worked at the Brooklyn Navy yard grinding burrs off of torpedoes, then at the Newport Torpedo Station in Newport, Rhode Island, as a draftsperson for torpedo design revisions. Around the time she left the Art Project, she married Dmitri Goulandris and was divorced five years later. In 1947 she married writer Ed Stone. Their daughter Ramie was born in 1948.

== California, 1953-1992 ==
Mary Perry Stone, her husband Ed, and their daughter moved to San Francisco in 1953, where she continued to sculpt and paint. Stone won an award from the Oakland Museum's 1958 California Sculptors Annual for her sculpture Musician. She exhibited in various galleries in the San Francisco area, including Telegraph Hill Gallery, the Artists Cooperative, the Greta Williams Gallery, and Grodsky's. In 1962 Stone and fellow artist Richard Van Wingerden exhibited together at Neville's.

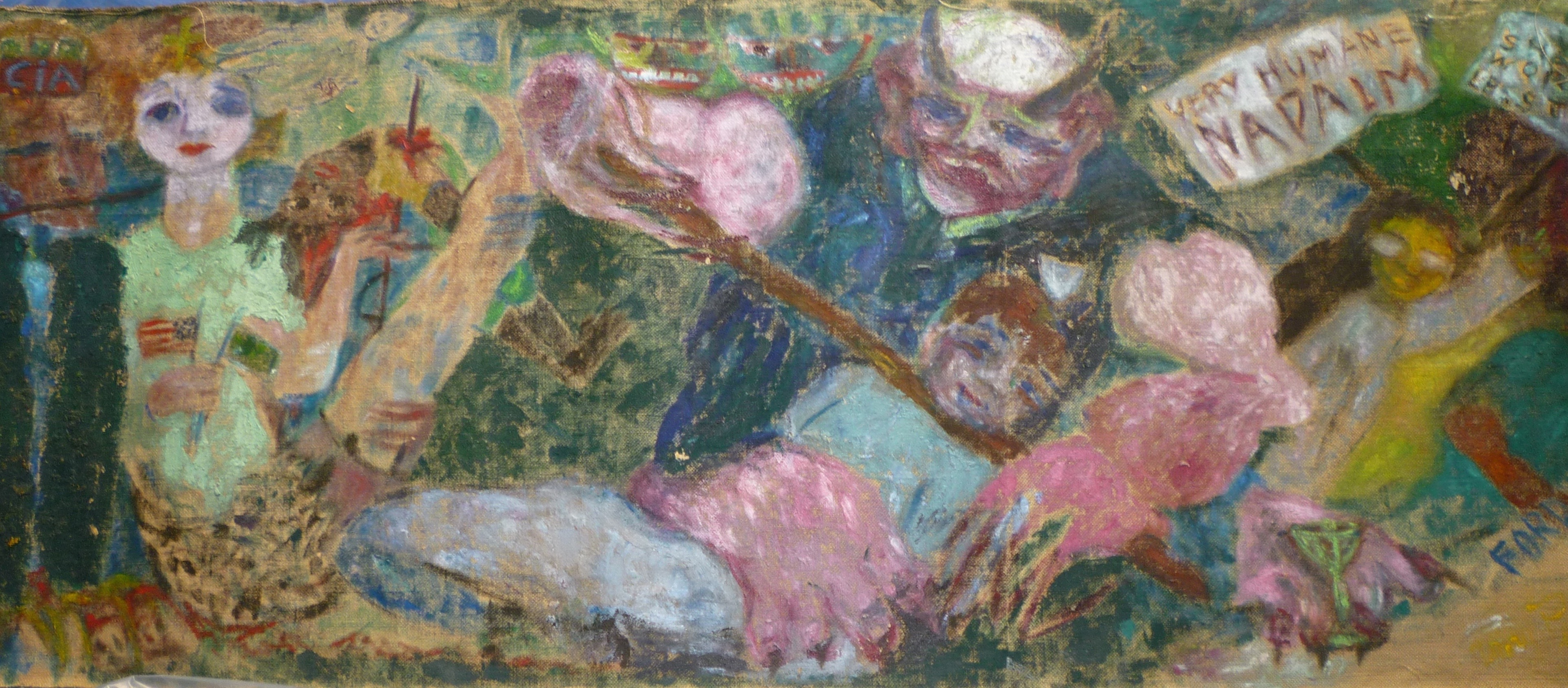
Mary Perry Stone, Comment on Vietnam. Oil on canvas, 180 x 34 inches

In the 1960s and 1970s, Stone began working primarily as a painter. As a reaction to the Civil Rights struggles and Vietnam war, she began creating social protest murals and paintings, including “disturbing images of the innocent victims, especially women and children.” She also contributed artwork to People’s World, particularly drawings of women that provided social/political commentary. She had a solo anti-Vietnam-war exhibition at Dominican College's San Marco Gallery in 1968 and became part of the Sausalito Teahouse group founded by Ross Curtis, an artist and political progressive. A 2016 documentary, I Paint, I Protest contains detailed commentary by her daughter Ramie Streng on some of Stone's paintings related to the Civil Rights movement and the Vietnam war.

Stone established an art gallery in Mill Valley, California, followed in 1964 by the Mary Perry Stone Studio Gallery in San Rafael. She exhibited artists including Ross Curtis, Eileen Curtis, Richard Van Wingerden and Russell Chatham.

Stone was divorced from her husband Ed in 1975.

== Oregon, 1992-2007 ==
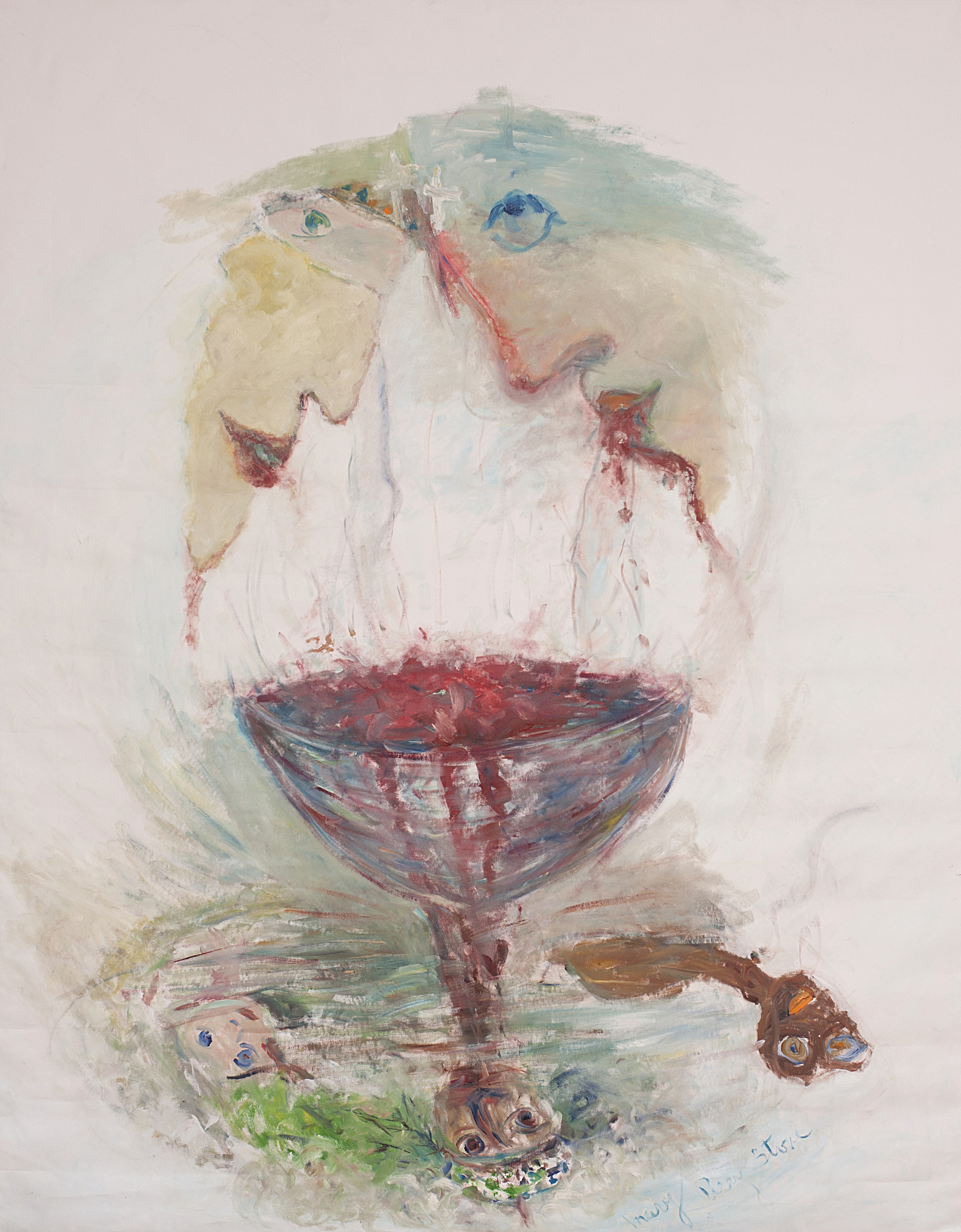
Mary Perry Stone, Thanksgiving - Thank You Slaves. Oil on canvas, 63 x 78 inches, 1998.

Stone moved from the Bay Area to Ashland, Oregon, in 1992. In Ashland she focused on painting social protest murals. These included The Devil and His Wife Cavorting in the Free Markets of the World, Eve Gives Birth to Adam, and Tiptoe Through the Homeless. The murals are shown, along with archival footage of Stone herself, in the documentary Plenty to Say: The Radical Murals of Mary Perry Stone.

In Oregon, Stone exhibited at galleries including the Jega Gallery (1997) and The Rogue Gallery and Art Center (“60 Years of Protest,” 2000). A solo show, “A Lifetime of Art,” at the Grants Pass Museum of Art in 2001 included the painting Corporate Predator. The last solo show of Stone's lifetime was in 2006 at the Thorndike Gallery at the University of Southern Oregon.

After's Stone's death, the Jega Gallery and Madashell Galleries exhibited her paintings; the Madashell show was entitled “Working for a Just World – A Collection of Protest Murals.” Her murals, War, Thanksgiving – Thank You Slaves, and Tickertape-Wall Street-Feast of the Bulls were also reprinted in the magazine Arts Politic (2009). Southern Oregon University's Schneider Museum of Art included work by Stone in its exhibit “The Mythical State of Jefferson” in 2010. On February 5, 2010, the inaugural exhibit at “The Mary Perry Stone Women’s Art Gallery” at the Missing Peace Art Space opened in Dayton, Ohio. This exhibit, entitled “Art Makes Us Human,” showed Stone's social protest work.

Mary Perry Stone died at the age of 98 on June 6, 2007, in Ashland, Oregon.
