= Joseph Wolins =

American painter (1915–1999)

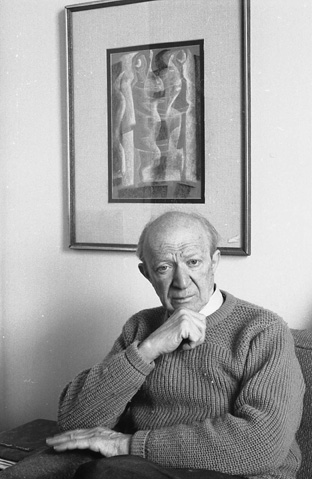
- Joseph Wolins in his Westbeth apartment (artist's residence on lower West side of New York City) with one of his pastel works on paper, taken by his son John Wolins, 1983.
- Born: 1915; Atlantic City, New Jersey, USA
- Died: 1999 (aged 83–84); New York City
- Education: National Academy of Design
- Known for: Painting

Joseph Wolins (born Atlantic City, New Jersey, 1915, died 1999, New York City) was an American painter whose influences included Piero della Francesca, Mantegna and Giotto. He studied at the National Academy of Design between 1935 and 1941 with Leon Kroll and held his first solo exhibition in 1947 at the New York Contemporary Arts Gallery. His work is in public collections including those of the Smithsonian American Art Museum and the Butler Institute of American Art.

He also contributed to the Index of American Design, which can be found at the National Gallery of Art in Washington, DC.

== Exhibitions ==
World’s Fair, New York
J.B. Neumann Gallery, New York
Toledo Museum, Toledo Ohio
Corcoran Art Gallery, Washington, D.C.
University of Illinois Art Museum
Pennsylvania Academy of Fine Arts, Philadelphia, PA
Whitney Museum, New York
São Paulo Museum of Modern Art, São Paulo, Brazil
Norfolk Museum, Norfolk, Virginia
The Smithsonian Institution, Washington, D.C.
Butler Art Institute, Youngstown, Ohio

== Solo shows ==
Contemporary Arts Gallery, New York
Bodley Gallery, New York
Silvermine Guild, Norwalk, Connecticut
Agra Gallery, Washington, D.C.
Adler Gallery, New York
Perlow Gallery, New York

== Permanent collections ==
Metropolitan Museum of Art, New York
Norfolk Museum, Virginia
Albrecht Museum, St. Joseph’s University, Missouri
The Museum in Ein Hod, Israel
Butler Art Institute, Youngstown, Ohio
Wichita Art Museum, Kansas
National Museum of American Art, Washington, D.C.
Slater Memorial Museum, Norwich, Connecticut
New Britain Museum, Connecticut
Boca Raton Museum, Florida
Everson Art Museum, Syracuse, New York
Ball State University Art Museum, Muncie, Indiana
Museum of Biblical Art, Dallas, Texas

National Gallery of Art, Washington, D.C., as part of the Index of American Design. See his artist information page on the NGA website.

== Awards ==
The Mark Rothko Award
Audubon Arts
National Institute of Arts and Letters
American Society of Contemporary Artists
Listed in:
Who’s Who in America
Who’s Who International
Who’s Who in American Art
