= Index of American Design =

Collection of watercolor drawings in the National Gallery of Art

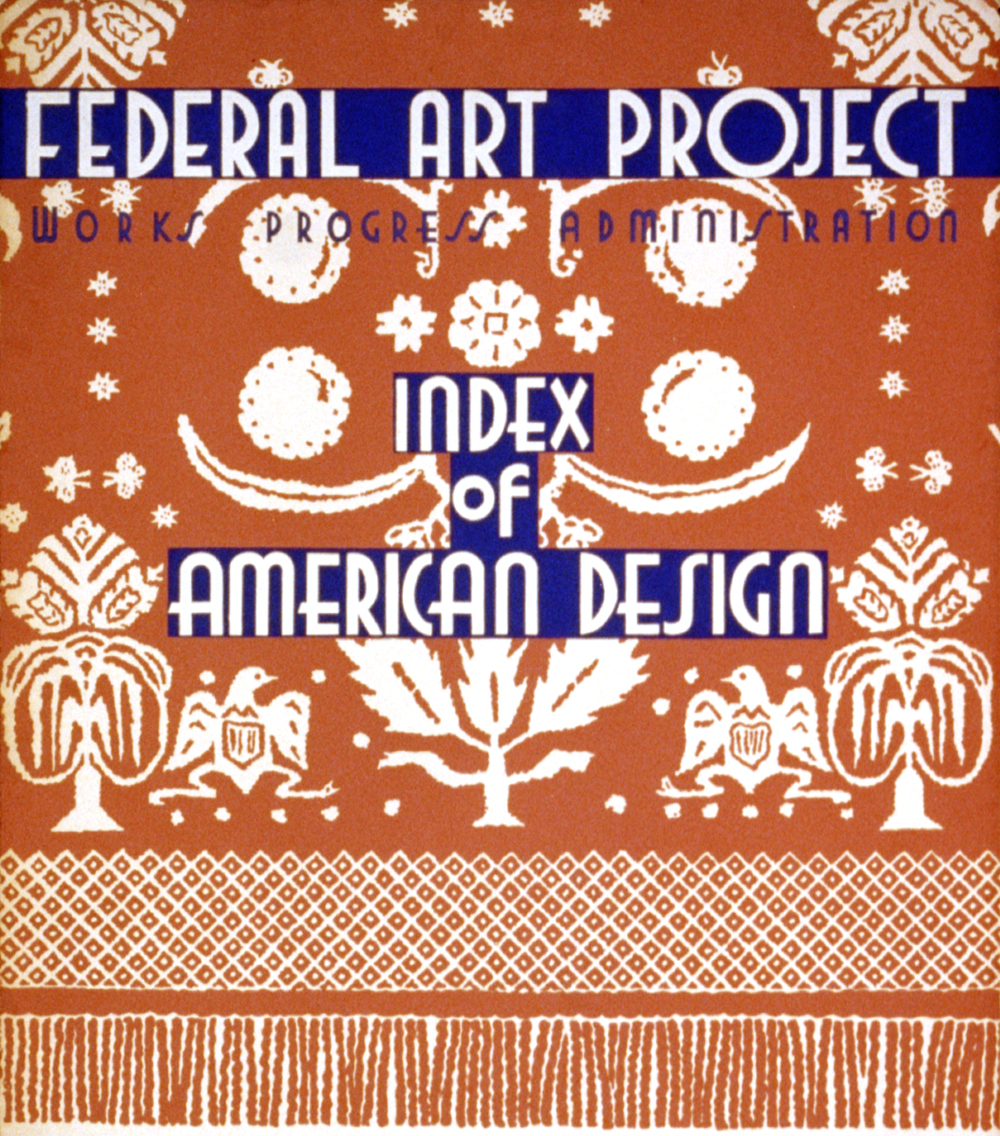
Federal Art Project Illinois poster for an exhibition of the Index of American Design

The artist color sketches after research worker has authenticated the design.

The Index of American Design program of the Federal Art Project produced a pictorial survey of the crafts and decorative arts of the United States from the early colonial period to 1900. Artists working for the Index produced a collection of 18,257 watercolor drawings of American decorative and folk arts objects, held by the National Gallery of Art in Washington, D.C. Although the collection was created by about 400 artists between 1935 and 1942, it was seen more as documentation than personal expression, which is among the reasons it is lesser known than other Federal Art Projects. The Index's goal was establishing the basis for and contextualizing American art and design using, as a basis, these items created between the colonial period and the end of the nineteenth century. Suzanne Chapman (1904-1990) is credited with developing a technique for creating meticulously rendered watercolors and drawings used in the Index. The technique was shared with hundreds of artists involved with creating the Index.

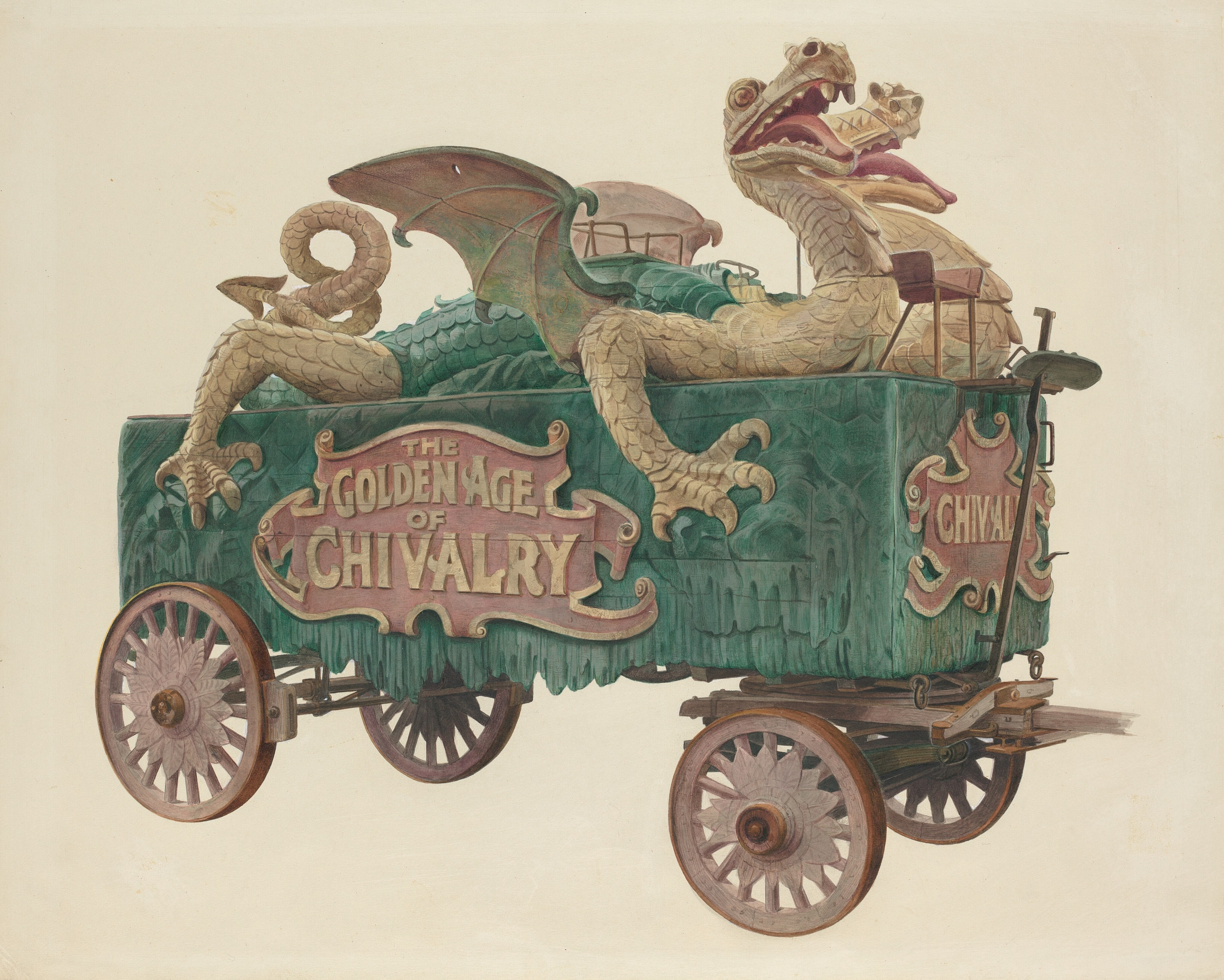
"Age of Chivalry" Circus Wagon, a circa 1938 watercolor from Index of American Design, National Gallery of Art.

Constance Rourke was the editor and resident scholar of the Index; Ruth Reeves was its field supervisor. Rourke's interest stemmed, in part, from her work on Charles Sheeler. Among the projects that grew out of the Index is Clarence Hornung's Treasury of American Design and as a jobs creation vehicle, the creation of the index employed about one thousand individuals in thirty four different states.

== Notable artists and administrators ==
- Juanita Donahoo
- Fletcher Hanks
- Romana Javitz
- Edward Loper
- Lillian Mosseller
- Owen Middleton
- Raoul Pene Du Bois
- Ruth Reeves
- Joseph Wolins
