= American Union of Decorative Artists and Craftsmen =

Defunct American trade association

American Union of Decorative Artists and Craftsmen (AUDAC)
- Abbreviation: AUDAC
- Formation: 1928
- Founder: Paul T. Frankl
- Dissolved: early 1930s
- Legal status: Defunct
- Location: New York, New York
- Region served: United States

The American Union of Decorative Artists and Craftsmen (AUDAC) was an American society of designers and decorative artists that was active from 1928 until the early 1930s. The group aimed to bring modern principles of design, such as those promoted in Europe by the Wiener Werkstätte and the Bauhaus, to decorative arts in the United States.

== History ==
The modernist furniture designer Paul T. Frankl immigrated from Vienna to New York in 1914. He worked to establish Europe's flourishing principles of contemporary design in the United States by writing books such as New Dimensions: The Decorative Arts of Today and by establishing a collective of fellow designers called the American Union of Decorative Artists and Craftsmen (AUDAC) in 1928. Early members included designers who exhibited at the American Designers' Gallery, which showed interiors and furnishings designed by contemporary New York designers, such as Donald Deskey and Ilonka Karasz.

AUDAC was modeled on European decorative arts societies such as the Société des Artistes Décorateurs in France. They published books on the new American design such as Modern American Design and Annual of American Design and put together influential exhibitions of their members' work, including one at the Brooklyn Museum in 1931 which showed work by Russel Wright, Ruth Reeves, and Rockwell Kent among many others.

The group was well known by the early 1930s when Radio City Music Hall commissioned Donald Deskey and other AUDAC members to design the fabrics, textiles, and furnishings for the interior. Many members (see list below) went on to long careers and well-known places in the history of twentieth-century design. However, due to the 1930s economic depression, the formal association was defunct by 1934.

== Mission ==
AUDAC placed an ad in a supplement for the magazine Creative Art in March 1930 which listed contact information for many of its members and described the mission of the American Union of Decorative Artists and Craftsmen thus:

AUDAC stands convinced that contemporary life demands an appropriate setting and that it is the work of the artist of all ages to mould the external world to suit the life of his time.

AUDAC realizes that the cultural contribution of an era is as clearly reflected in the decorative as in the other arts.

AUDAC was founded to give these convictions organized aid and voice.

AUDAC stands for: The advancement of the new tendencies in the decorative, industrial and applied arts. The elevation of standards in contemporary design.

The development of STYLE rather than styles.

== Members ==
AUDAC was founded by Paul T. Frankl in 1928. Their members included:

- M. F. Agha
- Richard F. Bach
- Lucian Bernhard
- M. D. C. Crawford
- Donald Deskey
- Alice Donaldson
- Hugh Ferriss
- Norman Bel Geddes
- C. Adolph Glassgold
- Wolfgang and Pola Hoffmann
- Ellen M. Kern
- Frederick John Kiesler
- Peter Larsen
- Robert Leonard
- Marguerita Mergentime
- Lewis Mumford
- Ruth Reeves
- Winold Reiss
- Robert Schey
- Lee Simonson
- Edward Steichen
- Edward Buk Ulreich
- Kem Weber
- Frank Lloyd Wright
- Russel Wright
- Paul M. Zimmermann

== Sources ==
- American Union of Decorative Artists and Craftsmen, Robert L. Leonard, and C. Adolph Glassgold (1933). Modern American Design. New York, Ives Washburn. OCLC 1251649.
- Byars, Mel, "What Makes American Design American" (intro. to facsimile). American Union of Decorative Artists and Craftsmen, Robert L. Leonard, and C. Adolph Glassgold (1992). Modern American Design facsimile edition. Acanthus Press. ISBN 9780926494015. OCLC 759683655.
- "American Union of Decorative Artist and Craftsmen" in Byars, Mel (2004). The Design Encyclopedia, New York: The Museum of Modern Art. ISBN 0-87070-012-X
- American Union of Decorative Artists and Craftsmen (1931). Annual of American Design. New York, Ives Washburn. OCLC 1251637.
- Crosse, John (2010). "Foundations of Los Angeles Modernism: Richard Neutra's Mod Squad". Southern California Architectural History.
- Frankl, Paul Theodore (1928). New Dimensions: The Decorative Arts of Today in Words and Pictures. New York, Payson Clarke. OCLC 299341249.
- Heilbrunn Timeline of Art History (2018). "Design, 1925-50". The Metropolitan Museum of Art.
- New York City Landmarks Preservation Commission (1978). "RADIO CITY MUSIC HALL" (PDF).
- Susswein, Rita; Whitehead, Philip (1931). "The AUDAC Exhibition at the Brooklyn Museum". Parnassus. 3 (5): 14–15. doi:10.2307/770529. JSTOR 770529. S2CID 193025651.
- Wilson, Richard Guy (2015). "Art Deco in the USA". Grove Art Online. Oxford University Press. doi:10.1093/gao/9781884446054.article.T2283819.
- Woodham, Jonathan M. (2016). "American Union of Decorative Artists and Craftsmen". A Dictionary of Modern Design. Oxford University Press. ISBN 9780191726767.
