= Marguerita Mergentime =

North American textile designer

Marguerita Mergentime (1894–1941) was an American textile designer best known for printed fabrics, making her mark in the 1930s with table linens in bold colors and innovative patterns created to enliven American households. Mergentime also designed sheets, towels, and tableware. In New York City in the 1930s, Mergentime worked with some of the best-known designers of the day, including Donald Deskey, Russel Wright, and Frederick Kiesler. Her work was featured in The New Yorker, House & Garden, House Beautiful, and Vogue.

== Biography ==
Born Marguerita Straus on March 3, 1894, in Upper West Side, Manhattan, she was the daughter of Max and Adelaide (Ottenheim) Straus. Mergentime graduated from the Ethical Culture School. She pursued art studies through classes at Teachers College from 1923 to 1927, as well as with designer Ilonka Karasz and through museum study rooms. In 1914, she married Charles Mergentime, a businessman and investor, and they had two daughters. The sitting room of the Mergentime's New York apartment was designed by Frederick Kiesler.

== Career ==
In the late 1920s and early 1930s Mergentime, unable to find the types of table linens she wanted, set out to fill this niche by becoming a textile designer. She began to educate herself, conducting research in museums and studying the arts with designers such as Ilonka Karasz. In addition to textiles her studies covered diverse areas including bookbinding, music, photography, and painting. Mergentime become a member of the American Union of Decorative Artists and Craftsmen (AUDAC) as early as 1929. Mergentime's AUDAC colleagues included numerous influential designers whose works define 20th-century modernism in America, such as Frank Lloyd Wright, Egmont Arens, Donald Deskey, Norman Bel Geddes, Eliel Saarinen, and Russel Wright. Her textiles were included in the 1931 AUDAC exhibition at the Brooklyn Museum, along with those by Mariska Karasz; the press release for the exhibition states: "Miss Mergentime is a designer of textiles, packaging, wallpaper, and is the designing stylist for the Kleinert Rubber Company." Mergentime was also a member of the Fashion Group.

For Radio City Music Hall, which opened in New York City in 1932, Mergentime was commissioned by Donald Deskey, the chief interior designer of the theater, to create her Lilies in the Air fabric that covers the walls in the Ladies' Lounge and a carpet for the Grand Lounge. Mergentime's fabric and carpet designs can be seen today in Radio City Music Hall, along with textiles by Mergentime's colleague Ruth Reeves. Press for the opening of the music hall mentions Mergentime's role in the interior designs stating that "among other specially designed fabrics are hangings by Marguerite [sic] Mergentime.

Beginning in 1934, Mergentime focused her talent on producing table linens sold at Macy's and Lord & Taylor in New York, as well as at department stores throughout America. Mergentime's personal passions in gardening, American history, folk art, politics, and typography can be seen on her cloths. Numerous articles and advertisements promoted her career, and her work appeared in exhibitions, most notably the Metropolitan Museum of Art's industrial arts shows, in 1934 in Ely Jacques Kahn's section, and in 1940 in Edward Durell Stone's section. Dorothy Liebes, at the time creative director of Goodall Decorative Fabrics, commissioned Mergentime in the late 1930s to create a collection for the firm. In 1939 Mergentime designed a souvenir tablecloth for the New York World's Fair and a hanging for the Golden Gate International Exposition in San Francisco. In 1940, Mergentime worked with Russel Wright on his American Way campaign to promote household objects by the nation's artists that were sold at stores around the country.

== Legacy ==
Her work resides in museum collections including the Museum of Modern Art, New York; the Cooper Hewitt, Smithsonian Design Museum; the Brooklyn Museum; the Museum at FIT; and the Allentown Art Museum.
