= Ruth Reeves =

American painter, Art Deco textile designer and expert on Indian handicrafts

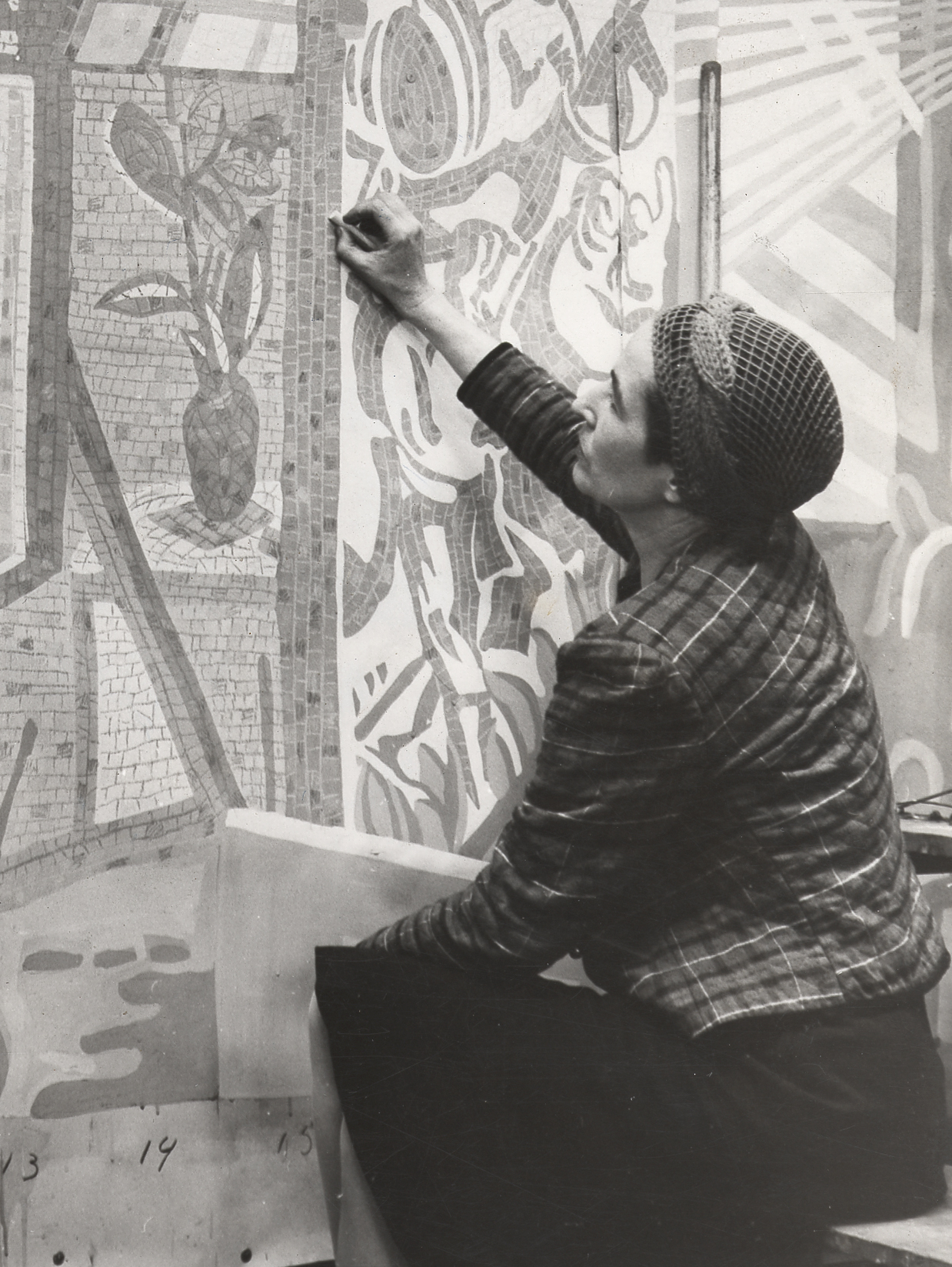
- Reeves at work in 1940
- Born: July 14, 1892; Redlands, California, US
- Died: December 23, 1966 (aged 74); New Delhi, India
- Education: Pratt Institute; Art Students League; San Francisco Art Institute; Fernand Léger
- Known for: Painting, textile design, Indian handicrafts expert
- Spouses: Leland Olds (m. 1917; div. 1922) Donald Robert Baker (div. 1940)
- Awards: Fulbright grant to India; 1956

Ruth Marie Reeves (1892–1966) was an American painter, Art Deco textile designer and expert on Indian handicrafts.

== Early life and education ==
Ruth Marie Reeves was born in Redlands, California, on July 14, 1892. She attended the Pratt Institute in Brooklyn from 1910 to 1911, the San Francisco Art Institute from 1911 to 1913, and won an Art Students League's scholarship in 1913, where she studied until 1915. In 1917 she married Leland Olds, a graduate of Amherst College. They divorced in 1922.

In 1920, Reeves traveled to Paris and studied with Fernand Léger. During her time in Paris, she pioneered the use of vat dyes and the screen print process for home fabrics.

== Career ==
Returning to the United States in 1927, her designs were influenced by modern developments in France like Cubism. Reeves's first exhibition was with the American Designers' Gallery in New York, where she showed textiles. Lewis Mumford called her wall hangings and dresses inspired by traditional Guatemalan designs shown in 1935 "probably the most interesting work any designer has offered for commercial production today."

One of her best-known works was the carpeting and wall fabrics of Radio City Music Hall in New York City. Her fabric and carpet designs along with those of her colleague Marguerita Mergentime can be seen there today. Donald Deskey, who won the competition to design the interiors for Radio City Music Hall, commissioned Reeves and Mergentime to design textiles for the hall.

The Index of American Design, one of three main divisions of the Federal Art Project (FAP), was originally conceived by Reeves and Romana Javitz, curator of the Picture Collection at the New York Public Library, as a way for the American artist to find authentic American everyday objects to use as visual references for their work. The Index was established with the FAP in January 1936 with Reeves as its national supervisor. She held the position until the spring when Adolph Cook Glassgold replaced her. Within the Index, Shaker works were highly prized as Reeves felt they emphasized the art of the American common man.

She later taught at the Cooper Union Art School in New York. She married engineer Donald Robert Baker and had three daughters. The couple separated in 1940.

After 1956, she moved to India as a Fulbright scholar, where she served on the All India Handicrafts Board. She died in New Delhi in 1966.

== Textile design ==
She often worked with narratives sourced from her life or friends lives. South Mountain is one of her earliest narrative pieces designed as an autobiographical family portrait. It was named after the road she lived on in the artist colony in New City, New York. This piece was the start of her "personal prints" that were privately commissioned limited editions.

In 1930, Reeve was commissioned by the W. & J. Sloane Company to create a group of narrative textiles to be submitted to the American Federation of Art for their International Exhibition of Decorative Metalwork and Cotton Textiles that was to be held later that year at the Metropolitan Museum of Art. The company neglected to check in on her progress and in the end were horrified at the unconventional fabric she designed. Each pattern was printed on twenty-nine different types of cotton and depicted a series of rooms in an imaginary house. The fabrics also didn't sell and the relationship ended unhappily. The most notable work from this collection is "American Scene," a panorama that celebrates everyday American life: work, sports, and family.

In 1933, Reeves created a series of textiles inspired by the Hudson River School. These textiles were funded by a grant from the Gardner School Alumnae Fund. In 1934, the textiles were shown at the National Alliance of Art and Industry.

In 1934, she traveled to Guatemala through a sponsorship from the Carnegie Institution. The textiles she collected on this trip were exhibited at Radio City in New York. In 1935, she worked with R. H. Macy & Company to create five Guatemalan-inspired patterns that were some of her only works to be produced commercially.

== Works ==
- Ruth Reeves (1930) American Scene. W. & J. Sloane Company
- Ruth Reeves (1932) Carpets. Radio City Music Hall
- Ruth Reeves (1932) Wallpaper. Rockefeller Center
- Ruth Reeves (1962). Cire Perdue Casting in India. New Delhi: Crafts Museum.
