= Romana Javitz =

American artist, librarian

- Born: January 28, 1903; Russia
- Died: January 1980 (aged 76–77)
- Occupation: Librarian
- Employer: New York Public Library

Romana Javitz (January 28, 1903–January 1980) was an American artist, librarian, and Superintendent of the Picture Collection at the New York Public Library.

== Biography ==
=== Early life ===
Romana Javitz was born in Russia to Polish parents and immigrated to America in 1906. Her mother, Malvine, was a hat milliner and her father, Elias, maintained an import/export business. She grew up in the Bronx and the Upper West Side of Manhattan. She studied painting at the Art Student's League and began working at the New York Public Library (NYPL) in the Children's Room in 1919.

=== Career ===
Javitz was interested in how libraries and museums documented folk art and brought attention to the documentation of African-American folk art at the NYPL after viewing European cities documentation in the 1920s. In 1928, she became superintendent of the Picture Collection at the NYPL. She held the position until she retired in 1968. In the 1930s she assisted Arthur Alfonso Schomburg, Curator of the Library's Division of Negro History, Literature and Prints, by reviewing the collection to find important prints, photographs, and plates of African-American subjects. During her tenure, she instituted important innovations including requesting pictures with drawings on a call slip to locate the material and streamlined the process of adding new materials to the library with a team of artists and catalog card index.

In 1935, Javitz worked with Ruth Reeves, to create the Index of American Design that was part of the Works Progress Administration's Federal Art Project. The project was founded in the idea that modern designers, like Reeves, were unable to find visual resources from American material culture at libraries and other institutions. Javitz and Reeves hired unemployed artists and illustrators around the county to record the decorative arts of rural and urban regions of the U.S. The collection was later moved to the National Gallery of Art in Washington, D.C.

In 1936, Roy Stryker, head of the Farm Security Administration's Photographic Section, consulted Javitz about the organization of the Resettlement Administration files. Javitz saw the importance of the project and visited with Stryker in Washington, D.C. to work with him on all the new photographs and organize them into a cohesive collection.

Stryker also sent Javitz duplicate prints to ensure their future in New York City until he got assurance they would be preserved in Washington, D.C.

After World War II, Javitz kept acquiring work, making it the NYPL of the few institutions to take on contemporary work. In 1944, Javitz worked with the acting Librarian of Congress, Luther Evans, at the Library of Congress to establish pictorial standards for the newly formed Prints and Photographs Division.

In 1967, she was awarded the Gold Medal from the American Institute of Graphic Arts (AIGA).

== Death and legacy ==
Javitz died in 1980.

In 1998, the NYPL commemorated her role at the library by creating an exhibition Subject Matters: Photography, Romana Javitz and the New York Public Library, curated by Julia Van Haaften and Anthony T. Troncale, that showcases some of the notable photographs she acquired during her tenure. In 2008, the library's curator of photography, Stephen Pinson, organized an exhibit which included some of the works Javitz helped to preserve, in a show called Eminent Domain: Contemporary Photography and the City.

In 2020, Anthony T. Troncale (1958- ) published a compendium of writings by Romana Javitz as well as three interviews with her. Words on Pictures: Romana Javitz and the New York Public Library’s Picture Collection. Anthony T. Troncale. First edition. New York: Photo | Verso Publications, LLC, 2020. |Includes bibliographical references, appendices and index. 274 p. ISBN 978-1-7346409-0-8 (hardcover)
