= Showpeople's Committee to Save Radio City Music Hall =

Showpeople's Committee To Save Radio City Music Hall
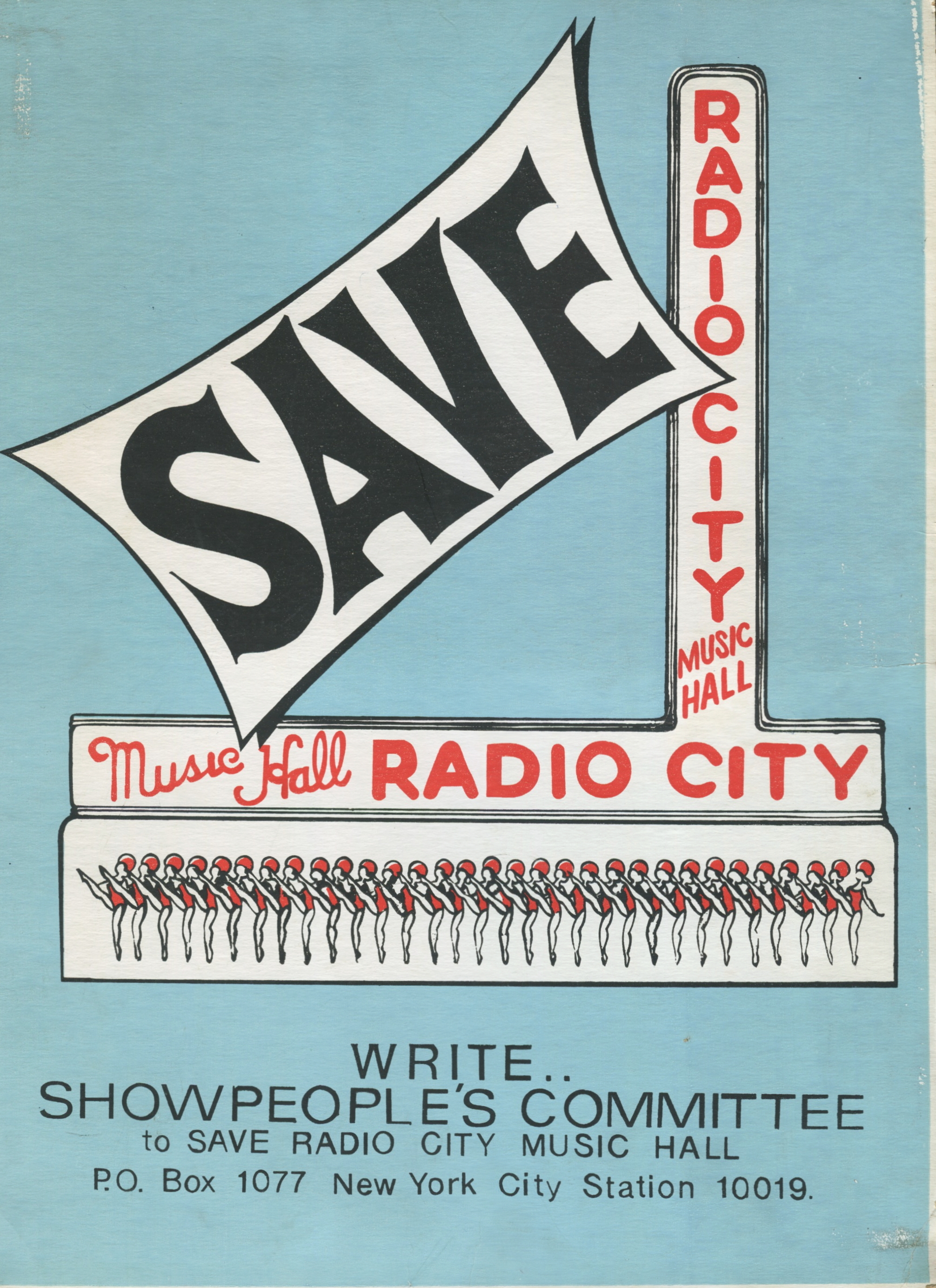
- Poster
- Formation: January 7, 1978
- Dissolved: May 1978
- Purpose: To prevent the closing and demolition of Radio City Music Hall in 1978
- Location: New York, NY
- President: Rosemary Novellino, Captain of the Radio City Music Hall Ballet Company
- Vice President: Eileen Collins, Rockette
- Key people: Bill Mearns, Captain of the Singers / Ron Hokuff, singer / Joyce Dwyer, Rockette / Cindy Peiffer, Rockette / Ginny Hounsell, Rockette / Frank Devlin, Costume Dept / Al Packard, Costume Dept / Steve Kelleher, Stage Manager / Bob Swan, Orchestra / Carmine DeLeo, Orchestra / Greg Kohar, Orchestra / Ray Bonett, Usher / Audrey Manning, Cashier / Vincent Klemmer, Stagehand / Al Manganaro, Stagehand / Tommy Healy, Dancer / Johnny Cashman, Dancer / Vinnie Cittadino, Stagehand / Herb Glazer, Stagehand

The Showpeople's Committee To Save Radio City Music Hall was an organization established for the purpose of preventing the closing and demolition of Radio City Music Hall in 1978.

On January 7, 1978, two days after Radio City Music Hall President Alton Marshall made the announcement that the iconic Art Deco theater would close on April 12, 1978, Rosemary Novellino, Dance Captain of the Radio City Music Hall Ballet Company, formed the Showpeople's Committee to Save Radio City Music Hall. Motivated by anger, shock and passion for the Music Hall, fellow employees joined the protest and elected Novellino president of the committee. The Committee membership consisted of Rockettes, ballet dancers, singers, musicians, ushers, costume department, stagehands and front of the house employees who banded together in an effort to save what they believed to be the last great movie palace in America. The committee was in no way connected with the management of Radio City Music Hall or Rockefeller Center.

Rosemary Novellino inspired fellow employees on their own time to create publicity in favor of keeping the Radio City Music Hall open, protecting it from demolition, and making every effort toward having the Music Hall declared a landmark building. The committee had a huge impact on motivating New York City and State politicians, celebrities of stage, film and television, local businesses throughout the community, and loyal fans of the Music Hall to join them in this major David and Goliath battle against the Rockefellers to save "The Showplace of The Nation." A letter writing campaign alone produced more than 150,000 signatures on petitions from all over the world.

Rosemary Novellino, often joined by other members of the committee, appeared on several television and radio shows to promote their cause, among them were The Bill Boggs Show, the Joe Franklin Show, and ABC's Good Morning America in New York City. She was invited to fly out to California to appear on Tom Snyder's Tomorrow, on NBC. and was also a guest speaker on radio broadcasts in Manhattan including Joe Franklin's radio program and WCBS Radio with Art Athens. The Committee generated several successful publicity stunts intended to embarrass the management of the Music Hall. On Sunday, April 3, 1978, employees appeared outside the theater in suits of armor to represent the battle to save the theater and used the opportunity to collect signatures on their petitions from audience members waiting in line to enter the theater. This event received coverage in major newspapers and television news broadcasts nationwide.

On the morning of March 14, 1978, the day of the Landmark Hearing, the Committee organized a publicity stunt in the form of an "impromptu" kick line by the Rockettes on the steps of City Hall. This successfully brought immediate attention from reporters who were there to cover the hearing.

Among the many experts and dignitaries invited to speak at the Landmark Hearing, was Rosemary Novellino, representing The Showpeople's Committee. The dramatic presentation by two Committee members of a mountain of signed petitions to the Landmark Commission following Rosemary's speech had a major effect on the outcome of the hearing.

Two weeks later, on March 28, Radio City Music Hall was declared a landmark by the New York City Landmarks Preservation Commission, giving the theater a 361-day reprieve. Six weeks later, on May 12, 1978, Radio City Music Hall was placed on the National Register of Historic Places.
