= Radio City Music Hall =

Venue and theater in New York City

- "The Showplace of the Nation"
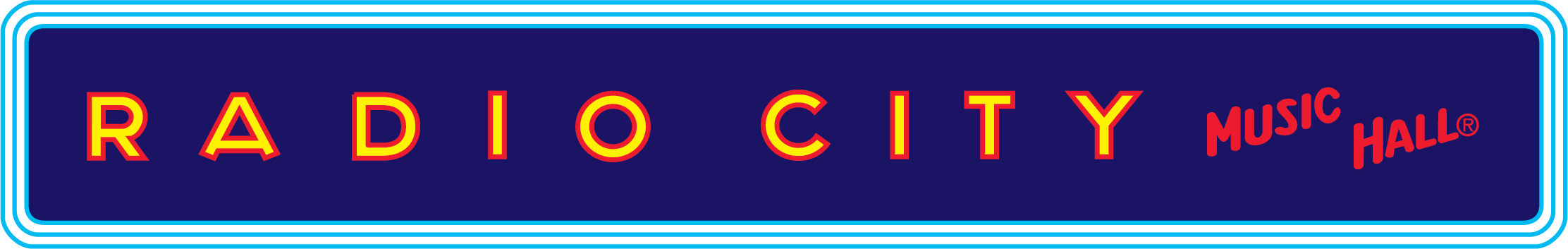

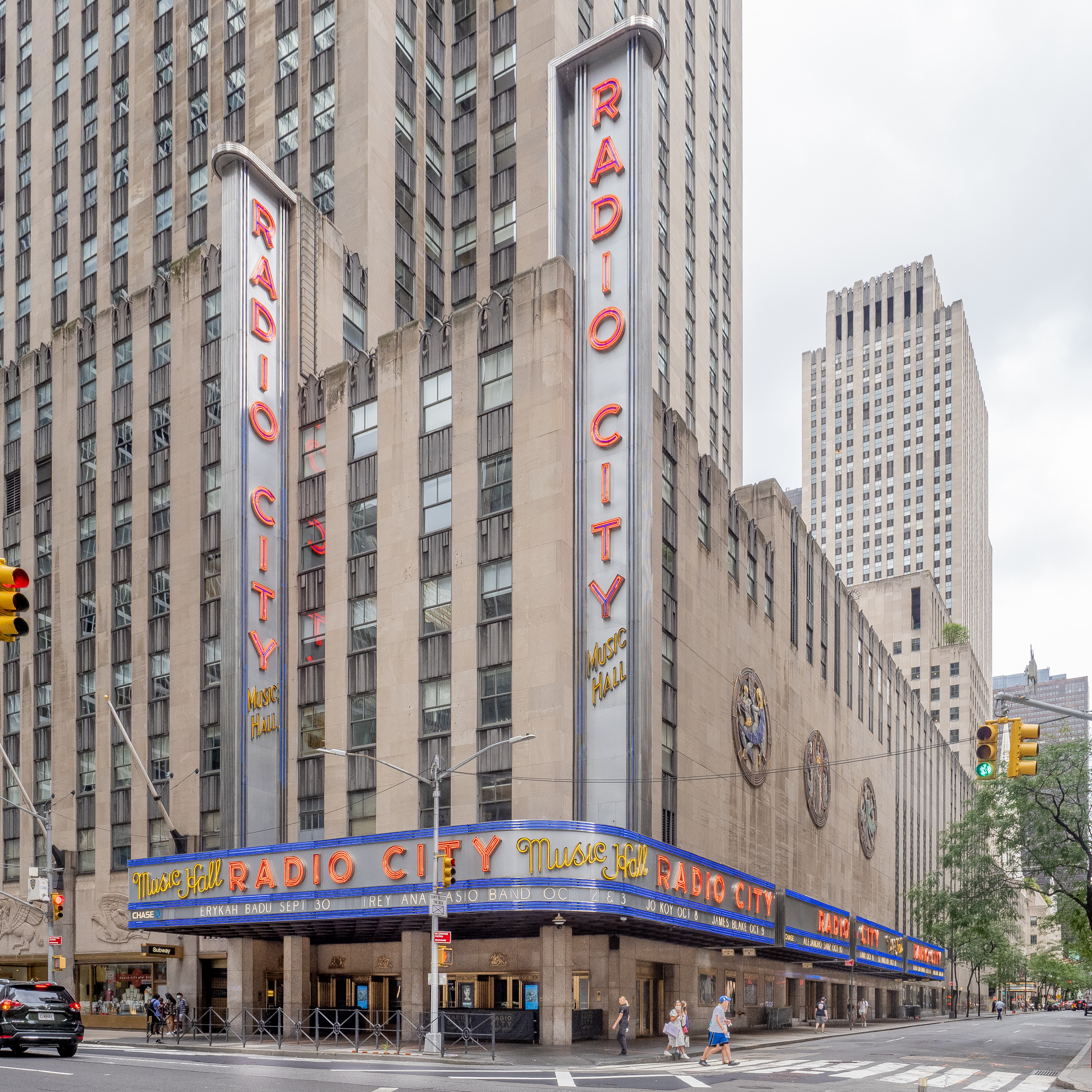
- Radio City Music Hall in 2021
- Interactive map of Radio City Music Hall
- Location: 1260 Avenue of the Americas (Sixth Avenue); Manhattan, New York
- Coordinates: 40°45′35″N 73°58′45″W
- Owner: Tishman Speyer Properties
- Operator: Madison Square Garden Entertainment
- Seating type: Raked
- Capacity: 5,960
- Type: Concert hall, entertainment venue

Construction
- Opened: December 27, 1932; 93 years ago
- Radio City Music Hall
- U.S. National Register of Historic Places
- U.S. National Historic Landmark District – Contributing property
- New York State Register of Historic Places
- New York City Landmark
- Area: 2 acres (0.8 ha)
- Architects: Edward Durell Stone; Donald Deskey
- Architectural style: Art Deco
- Part of: Rockefeller Center (ID87002591)
- NRHP reference No.: 78001880
- NYSRHP No.: 06101.000460
- NYCL No.: 0995 (interior); 1446 (exterior)

Significant dates
- Added to NRHP: May 8, 1978
- Designated NHLDCP: December 23, 1987
- Designated NYSRHP: June 23, 1980 (individual designation of Radio City Music Hall); December 23, 1987 (joint designation as part of Rockefeller Center)
- Designated NYCL: March 28, 1978 (interior); April 23, 1985 (exterior)

Radio City Music Hall (also known as Radio City) is an entertainment venue and theater at 1260 Avenue of the Americas, within Rockefeller Center, in the Midtown Manhattan neighborhood of New York City. Nicknamed "The Showplace of the Nation", it is the headquarters for the Rockettes. Radio City Music Hall was designed by Edward Durell Stone and Donald Deskey in the Art Deco style.

Radio City Music Hall was built on a plot of land that was originally intended for an opera house for the Metropolitan Opera, plans for which were canceled in 1929. It opened on December 27, 1932, as part of the construction of Rockefeller Center. The 5,960-seat Music Hall was the larger of two venues built for Rockefeller Center's "Radio City" section, the other being the RKO Roxy Theatre (later the Center Theatre); the "Radio City" name came to apply only to Radio City Music Hall. It was largely successful until the 1970s, when declining patronage nearly drove the theater to bankruptcy. Radio City was designated a New York City Landmark in May 1978, and it was restored and allowed to remain open. The theater was extensively renovated in 1999.

Radio City's four-tiered auditorium was the world's largest when it opened. The theater also contains a variety of art. Although Radio City was initially intended to host stage shows, within a year of its opening it was converted into a movie palace, hosting performances in a film-and-stage-spectacle format through the 1970s, and was the site of several movie premieres. By the late 20th and early 21st centuries, it primarily hosted concerts, including by leading pop and rock musicians, and live stage shows such as the Radio City Christmas Spectacular. Radio City has also hosted televised events including the Grammy Awards, Tony Awards, Daytime Emmy Awards, MTV Video Music Awards, and NFL draft, as well as university graduation ceremonies.

== History ==
Buildings of Rockefeller Center
Buildings and structures in Rockefeller Center:
1 1 Rockefeller Plaza
2 10 Rockefeller Plaza
3 La Maison Francaise
4 British Empire Building
5 30 Rockefeller Plaza
6 International Building
7 50 Rockefeller Plaza
8 1230 Avenue of the Americas
9 Radio City Music Hall
10 1270 Avenue of the Americas
11 75 Rockefeller Plaza
12 600 Fifth Avenue
13 608 Fifth Avenue
14 1271 Avenue of the Americas
15 1251 Avenue of the Americas
16 1221 Avenue of the Americas
17 1211 Avenue of the Americas

=== Development ===
==== Planning ====
The construction of Rockefeller Center occurred between 1932 and 1940 (Note: 30 Rockefeller Plaza was the first building to start construction, in March 1932. The last building was completed in 1940.) on land that John D. Rockefeller Jr. leased from Columbia University. The Rockefeller Center site was originally supposed to be occupied by a new opera house for the Metropolitan Opera. By 1928, Benjamin Wistar Morris and designer Joseph Urban were hired to come up with blueprints for the house. The new building was too expensive for the opera to fund by itself, and it needed an endowment; the project ultimately gained the support of John D. Rockefeller Jr. The planned opera house was canceled in December 1929 due to various issues, but Rockefeller made a deal with RCA to develop Rockefeller Center as a mass media complex with four theaters. This was later downsized to two theaters.

Samuel Roxy Rothafel, a successful theater operator who was renowned for his domination of the city's movie theater industry, joined the center's advisory board in 1930. He offered to build two theaters: a large vaudeville "International Music Hall" on the northernmost block, with more than 6,200 seats, and the smaller 3,500-seat "RKO Roxy" movie theater on the southernmost block. The idea for these theaters was inspired by Roxy's failed expansion of the 5,920-seat Roxy Theatre on 50th Street, one and a half blocks away. The Music Hall was to have a single admission price of $2 per person. Roxy also envisioned an elevated promenade between the two theaters, but this was never published in any of the official blueprints.

==== Design process ====
In September 1931, a group of NBC managers and architects toured Europe to find performers and look at theater designs. However, the group did not find any significant architectural details that they could use in the Radio City theaters. In any case, Roxy's friend Peter Clark turned out to have much more innovative designs for the proposed theaters than the Europeans did.

Roxy had a list of design requests for the Music Hall. First, he did not want the theater to have either a large balcony over the box seating or rows of box seating facing each other, as implemented in opera houses. One alternative called for "a rather deep balcony" and a shallower second balcony, but would have obstructed views from the rear orchestra. Consequently, the final plan used three tiers of balconies, cantilevered off the back wall. Second, Roxy specified that the stage contain a central section with three parts so the sets could be changed easily. Roxy wanted red seats because he believed it would make the theater successful, and he wished for the auditorium to be oval in shape because contemporary wisdom held that oval auditoriums had better acoustic qualities. Finally, he wanted to build at least 6,201 seats in the Music Hall so it would be larger than the Roxy Theatre. There were only 5,960 audience seats, but Roxy counted exactly 6,201 seats by including elevator stools, orchestra pit seats, and dressing-room chairs. Roxy also wanted the theater to have an "intimate" design as well. According to architect Henry Hofmeister, a single level of steeply raked stadium seating would likely have been used in a larger auditorium, quoting a theatrical proverb: "A house divided against the performer cannot stand."

Despite Roxy's specific requests for design features, the Music Hall's general design was determined by the Associated Architects, the architectural consortium that was designing the rest of Rockefeller Center. The Music Hall was to be at the northwest corner of the Rockefeller Center complex, at the base of the 1270 Sixth Avenue office building; the theater's rear wall would have to support the offices above. Radio City Music Hall was designed by architect Edward Durell Stone and interior designer Donald Deskey in the Art Deco style. Stone used Indiana limestone for the facade, as with all the other buildings in Rockefeller Center, but he also included some distinguishing features. Three 90-foot-tall (27 m) signs with the theater's name were placed on the facade, while intricately ornamented fire escapes were installed on the walls facing 50th and 51st Streets. Inside, Stone designed 165-foot-long (50 m) Grand Foyer with a large staircase, balconies, and mirrors and commissioned Ezra Winter for the grand foyer's 2,400-square-foot (220 m^{2}) mural, "Quest for the Fountain of Eternal Youth". Deskey, meanwhile, was selected as part of a competition for interior designers for the Music Hall. He had reportedly called Winter's painting "God-awful" and regarded the interior and exterior as not much better. To make the Music Hall presentable in his opinion, Deskey designed upholstery and furniture that was custom to the theater. Deskey's plan was regarded the best of 35 submissions, and he ultimately used the rococo style in his interior design.

==== Naming and construction ====
The International Music Hall evolved into a theater called Radio City Music Hall. The names "Radio City" and "Radio City Music Hall" derive from one of the complex's first tenants, the Radio Corporation of America (RCA), which planned a mass media complex called Radio City on the west side of Rockefeller Center. Over time, the appellation of "Radio City" devolved from describing the entire complex to just the complex's western section. Radio City Music Hall was the only part of the complex that retained the name by 1937, and the name "Radio City" became shorthand for the theater.

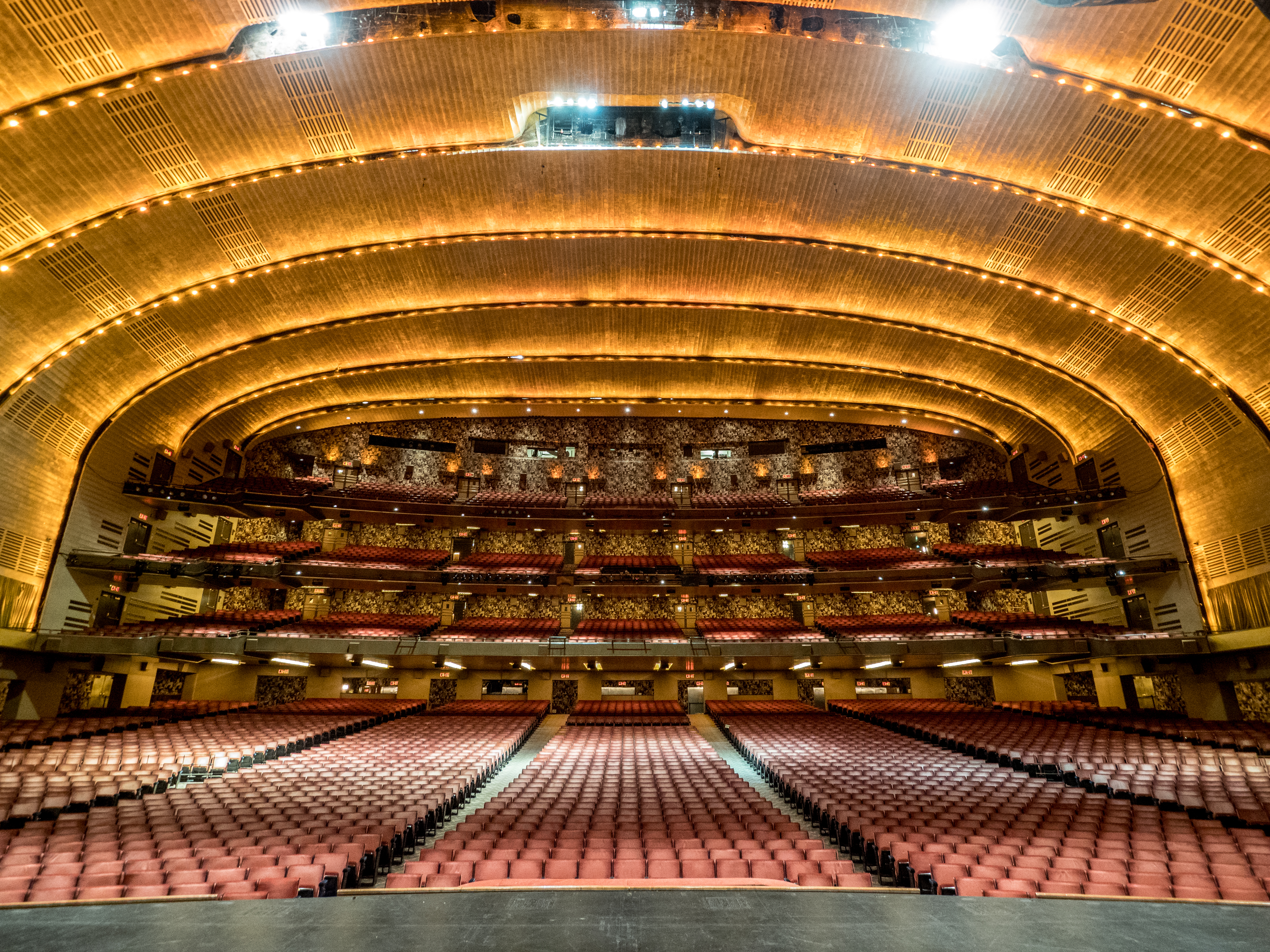
Interior view of auditorium, looking from the stage toward the seating areas

Construction on Radio City Music Hall started in December 1931, and the theater topped out in August 1932. Its construction set many records at the time, including the use of 15,000 miles (24,000 km) of copper wire and 200 miles (320 km) of brass pipe. In November 1932, Russell Markert's précision dance troupe the Roxyettes (later to be known as the Rockettes) left the Roxy Theatre and announced that they would be moving to Radio City. By then, Roxy was busy adding music acts in preparation for the theater's opening at the end of the year.

=== Opening ===
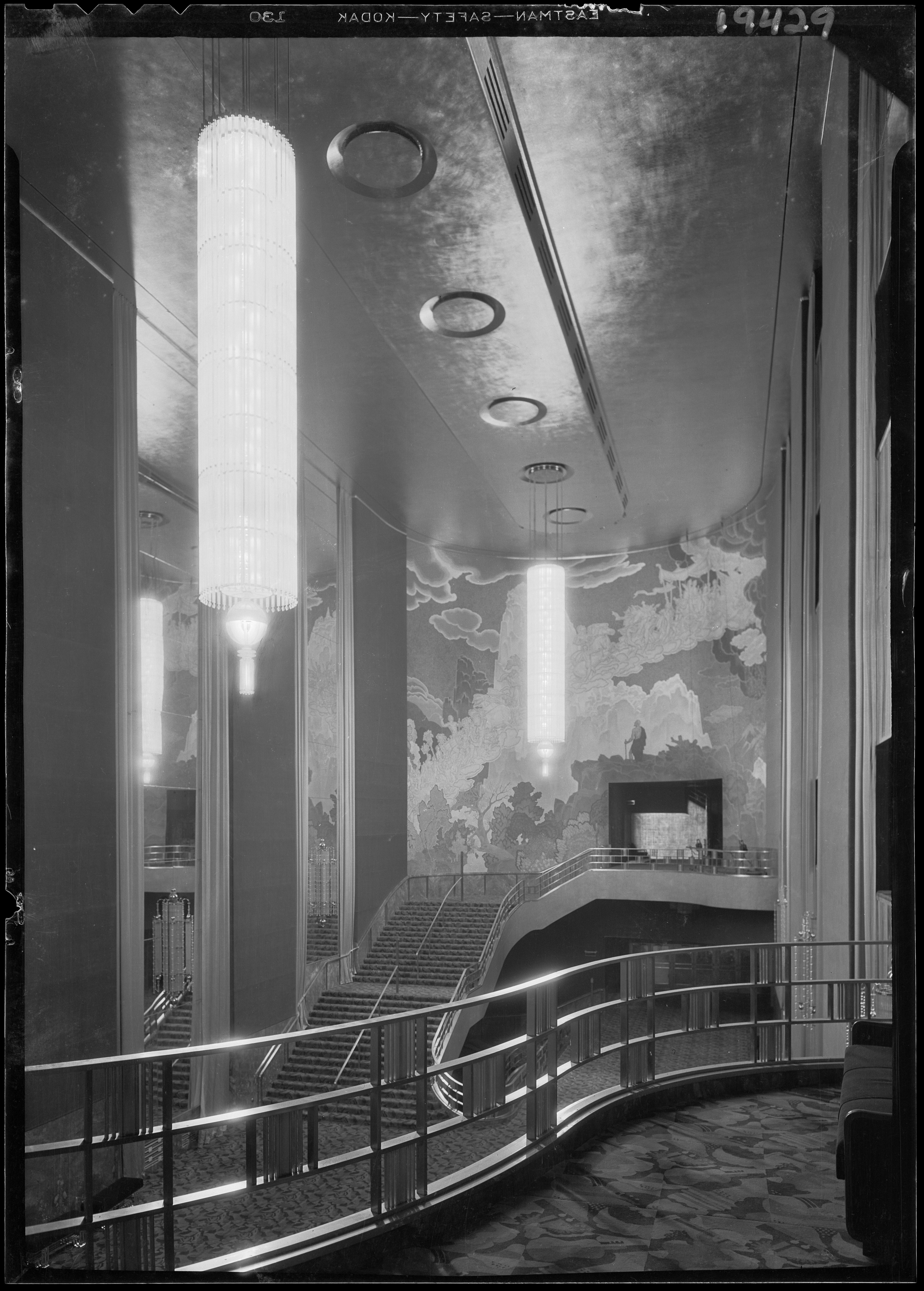
Lobby, 1932

Radio City Music Hall opened to the public on December 27, 1932, with a lavish stage show featuring numbers including Ray Bolger, Ronnie Mansfield, Doc Rockwell, Martha Graham, The Mirthquakers, The Tuskegee Choir and Patricia Bowman. The opening was designed to be a return to high-class variety entertainment; it flopped because of the long program, which ran from 8 p.m. to 2 a.m. the next day. A multitude of acts were crammed onto the world's largest stage, ensuring that individual acts were lost in the cavernous hall. As the premiere went on, audience members, including John Rockefeller Jr, waited in the lobby or left early. Some news reporters, tasked with writing reviews of the premiere, guessed the ending of the program because they left beforehand.

Reviews ranged from furious to commiserate. The film historian Terry Ramsaye wrote that "if the seating capacity of the Radio City Music Hall is precisely 6,200, then just exactly 6,199 persons must have been aware at the initial performance that they were eye witnesses to [...] the unveiling of the world's best 'bust'". Set designer Robert Edmond Jones resigned in disappointment, and Graham was fired. Despite the negative reviews of the performances, the theater's design was very well received. One reviewer stated: "It has been said of the new Music Hall that it needs no performers; that its beauty and comforts alone are sufficient to gratify the greediest of playgoers."

=== Conversion to movie house ===
Radio City's initial policy of live shows was so poorly received that, just two weeks after its opening, its managers announced that the theater would switch to showing feature films, accompanied by a spectacular stage show that Roxy had perfected. The announcement came amid false rumors that the theater would close. On January 11, 1933, after incurring a net operating loss of $180,000, Radio City became a movie and live-show house. The first film shown on the giant screen was Frank Capra's The Bitter Tea of General Yen. One critic said the same year that the Music Hall "is alone in carrying on the tradition of bigger things which underlay the whole project at the beginning". William G. Van Schmus was hired as the theater's managing director that March, though he had never managed a theater before. The top admission in the theater's first year was 40 cents during the day and 88 cents at night.

Radio City became the premiere showcase for films from the RKO-Radio studio, with Topaze being the first RKO film to play there in 1933. Some of the films that premiered at Radio City Music Hall included King Kong (1933), Breakfast at Tiffany's (1961), To Kill a Mockingbird (1962), Mary Poppins (1964), The Jungle Book (1967), and The Lion King (1994). The New York Daily News said that, in total, the theater hosted the premieres of over 650 movies. At the theater's peak, four complete performances were presented every day.

==== 1930s to 1950s ====
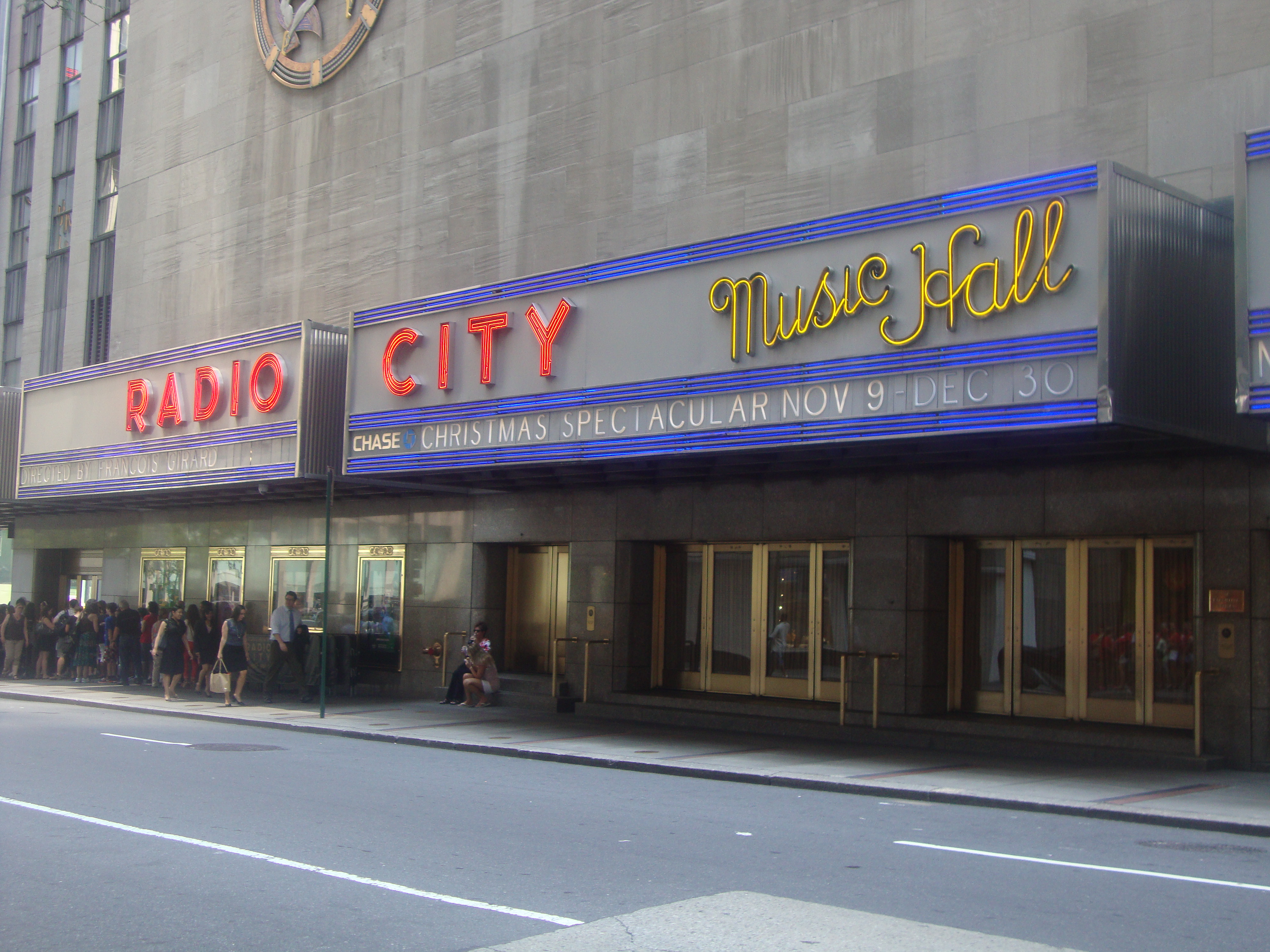
Seen from 51st Street

In addition to its movie screenings, Radio City hosted a holy hour for Catholics, Protestants, and Jews starting in 1933. The theater started experimenting with operatic performances in May 1934. The performances were so popular that Van Schmus decided to produce more opera shows to be performed four times a day. Van Schmus subsequently hired Serge Sudeikin, Albert Johnson, and Boris Aronson as the theater's art directors, under senior producer Leon Leonidoff. Early films screened at Radio City included Becky Sharp (1935), the first feature film to use three-strip Technicolor production; a 1936 film version of the musical Show Boat; and Snow White and the Seven Dwarfs (1937), Walt Disney's first full-length feature film. The theater's non-cinematic events included a stage show about the history of lighting, as well as a fundraiser for the Red Cross. By January 1937, more than 25 million people had visited the theater over the previous four years, paying total admission of $17.5 million.

Radio City was used for Easter worship services starting in 1940. The next year, the theater hosted "the most elaborate benefit performance ever held in New York", a World War II fundraiser. After Van Schmus died in January 1942, G. S. Eysell took over as the managing director. During this time, Radio City hosted films such as The Philadelphia Story (1940), Sunny (1941), The Valley of Decision (1945), and The Late George Apley (1947). Lines for the theater's Christmas show frequently stretched around the block. Performances by the Rockettes and a 60-member orchestra accompanied many live shows. Ernö Rapée, who had headed Radio City's orchestra since its opening, continued to lead the theater's orchestra until he died in 1945. Radio City continued to operate every day, although it sometimes closed briefly for part of the day. For example, it partially closed after U.S. president Franklin D. Roosevelt died in 1945 and again during a fuel shortage the next year.

Alexander Smallens became the theater's musical director in 1947, and Raymond Paige assumed that position three years later. The theater's sound system was upgraded in mid-1953, enabling the venue to show 3D films without intermission. Radio City disbanded its in-house male chorus in 1958, instead hiring choral acts from around the world. The theater also hosted benefit parties for Big Brothers Inc. from 1953 to at least 1959. Through the next decade, Radio City was successful regardless of the status of the city's economic, business, and entertainment sectors as a whole. It remained open even as other theaters such as the Paramount and the Roxy closed. A committee led by Radio City's director, Russell V. Dowling, selected the theater's live acts and other performances.

==== 1960s and 1970s ====
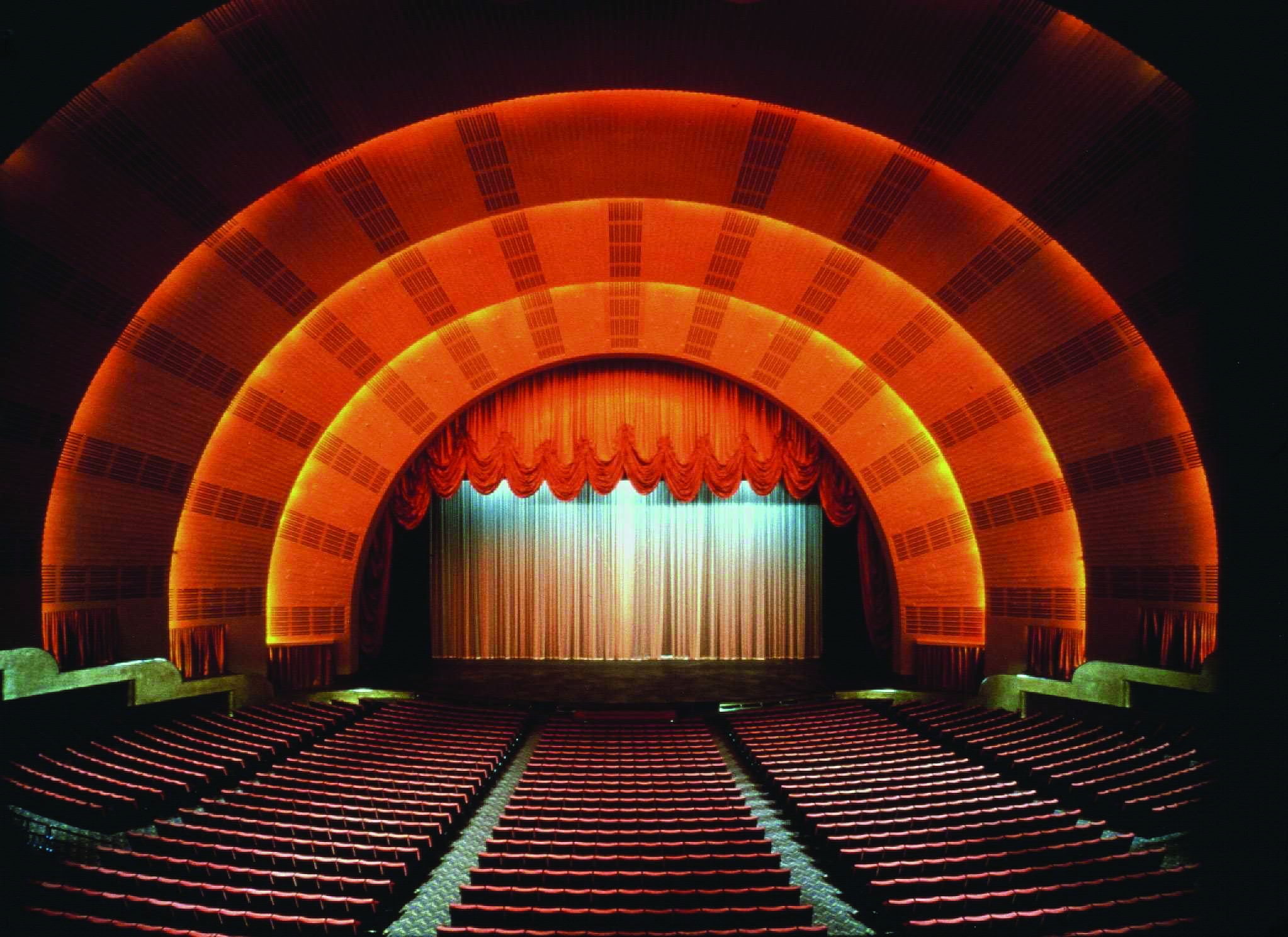
View of Radio City's proscenium

Upon its 30th anniversary in 1962, Radio City had nearly 200 million total patrons to date, more than the entire U.S. population at the time. The theater had shown 532 feature films to date; the most frequent actor was Cary Grant, who had appeared in 25 such films. Even so, officials had intended to close down Radio City Music Hall in 1962, one of several such unheeded announcements. Radio City closed temporarily in 1963 due to fears of a power failure, and the first full-day closure in its history took place on November 26, 1963, following the assassination of John F. Kennedy. By 1964, Radio City had an estimated 5.7 million annual visitors, who paid ticket prices of between 99 cents and $2.75 (equivalent to between $8 and $22 in 2025). The theater had evolved to show fewer adult-oriented films, instead choosing to show films for general audiences. However, Radio City's operating costs were almost twice as high as those of smaller performance venues. In addition, with the loosening of regulations on explicit content, Radio City's audience was mostly relegated to families.

Radio City was closed entirely for five days in March 1965 for its first full cleaning, which included changing the curtains and painting the ceiling. While the seating areas and floors had been cleaned regularly, the walls and ceilings had never been thoroughly cleaned and had accumulated a layer of dirt measuring almost 1/4 inch (6.4 mm) thick. Two or three hundred workers cleaned the theater around the clock, and it reopened on March 8, 1965, with the film Dear Heart. Repairs were also performed on the theater's organs during the nighttime. Also in 1965, Will Irwin and Rayburn Wright replaced Raymond Paige as the theater's musical directors following the latter's death. Russell V. Downing retired as Radio City's president in 1966 and was replaced by James F. Gould. As president of Radio City, Gould expanded its programming to include events such as rock concerts and wrestling matches before he retired in 1973. Radio City had its 200 millionth visitor in January 1967, a little less than two years after its renovation.

Tourism to New York City started to decline by 1969, which affected the theater's attendance. Even in the early 1970s, Radio City had five million visitors a year, more than the Empire State Building and Statue of Liberty combined. However, the proliferation of subtitled foreign movies had reduced attendance at Radio City. Changes in film distribution made it difficult to secure exclusive bookings of many films, forcing Radio City's managers to show reruns. Radio City preferred to show only family-friendly movies, which further limited their film choices. As a result, popular films such as Chinatown, Blazing Saddles, and The Godfather Part II failed Radio City's screening criteria. By 1972, Radio City had fired the performers' unions as well as six of the 36 Rockettes. The theater's management donated a painting by Stuart Davis to the Museum of Modern Art to reduce Radio City Music Hall's tax burden. That October, Radio City was closed temporarily after officials could not reach an employment agreement with the theater's musicians. Though the theater reopened a few days later, this was the first time it had ever been closed due to staffing issues.

Another labor dispute in 1973 forced Radio City to cut back its policy of mixed films and stage shows. A total shutdown was only avoided when the musicians' union agreed to a three-year contract in which musicians would be paid for 38 weeks per year, rather than 52. This allowed Radio City's managers to schedule other forms of live entertainment for the theater during the remaining 14 weeks. These live shows were split into two periods of seven weeks. Radio City's managers attempted to draw patrons by using the stage for rock concerts, pop festivals, and telecasts of boxing matches. Nonetheless, Radio City continued to lose $600,000 a year by early 1975. It cost $55,000 a week just to rent the theater, plus another $20,000 for employee salaries. There were just 3.5 million visitors annually, despite high attendance during Christmas, Easter, and the summer. Yet again, rumors spread that the venue would close, but Radio City's managers denied these claims. Architectural critic Ada Louise Huxtable wrote that Radio City was still more popular than other visitor attractions, such as the Metropolitan Museum of Art, the American Museum of Natural History, and the Bronx Zoo.

=== Bankruptcy and threat of closure ===
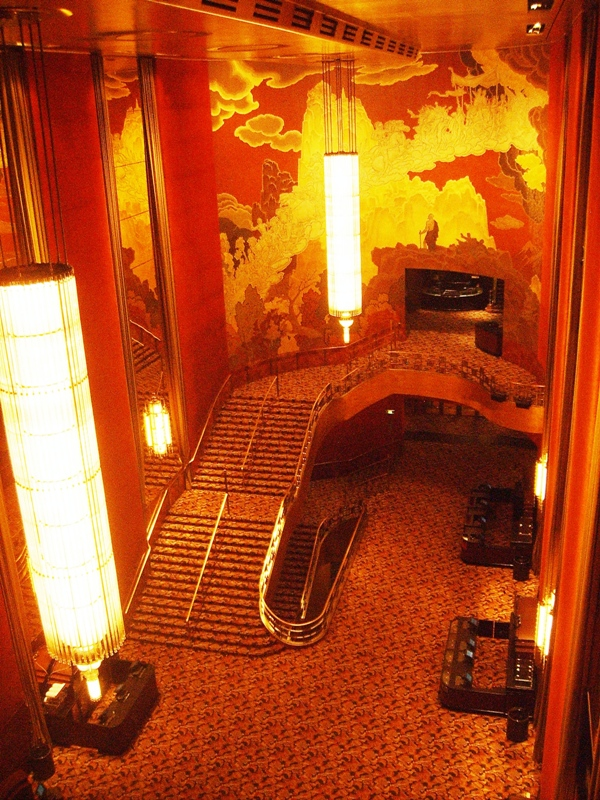
Radio City's grand foyer

In 1977, annual attendance reached an all-time low of 1.5 million, a 70 percent decrease from the 5 million visitors reported in 1968. The theater needed about 4 million annual visitors to break even. By January 1978, Radio City was in debt, and officials stated that it could not remain open after April. Rockefeller Center president Alton Marshall announced that, due to a projected loss of $3.5 million for the upcoming year, Radio City Music Hall would close on April 12. This came after the theater had lost $2.3 million in 1977. Many of Radio City's regular patrons moved to the suburbs, and there was a lingering fear of crime in New York City. A lack of family-friendly movies was also a factor in the planned closure. One proposal included converting the theater into tennis courts, a shopping mall, an aquarium, a hotel, a theme park, or the American Stock Exchange. Despite the potential tax benefits of preserving the theater, Rockefeller Center's managers were uninterested in saving Radio City, as they were focused on the site's real-estate development potential. Huxtable claimed that the managers' approach was "singularly lacking in any creative or cultural sensitivities".

Radio City Music Hall Ballet Company dance captain Rosemary Novellino formed the Showpeople's Committee to Save Radio City Music Hall. Lieutenant governor Mary Anne Krupsak, who had once been a Rockette, was also involved in the preservation efforts. The alliance made hundreds of calls to Rockefeller Center's manager; The New York Times described that the callers "jammed the switchboards" there. The Rockettes also protested outside New York City Hall. The New York City Landmarks Preservation Commission (LPC) held public hearings on whether to designate the theater's interior as a city landmark in March 1978. Of more than 100 speakers, most argued in favor of landmark status, but Rockefeller Center president Alton G. Marshall said that "landmark designation may well be the last nail in the Music Hall's coffin." In total, more than 100,000 people supported designating Radio City as a landmark. The LPC designated the interior as a city landmark on March 28.

Rockefeller Center Inc. filed a lawsuit to try to reverse the landmark designation, claiming that landmark status would be unattractive to potential investors, but the lawsuit was unsuccessful. Rockefeller Center Inc. indicated that it would demolish the theater had it succeeded in overturning the landmark designation. In April, just a few days before the planned closing date, the Urban Development Corporation (UDC) voted to create a nonprofit subsidiary to lease Radio City. Plans for a 20-story mixed-use tower above Radio City were announced the same month, with rents from the proposed tower providing the necessary funds to keep the theater open. An alternative involving transferring the theater's air rights to another building in the complex was also privately discussed. The UDC and Rockefeller Center Inc. agreed on April 12 to keep Radio City open, just hours before it had been set to close. On May 12, 1978, Radio City Music Hall was added to the National Register of Historic Places.

Radio City lost $2.3 million in the first ten months of 1978, despite the fact that a Frank Sinatra concert there had grossed more than $1.7 million. From April 13 to September 13, 1978, when the UDC operated the theater, losses totaled $1.2 million. The plans for an office building above the theater were recommended in a draft study that was published in February 1979. Davis Brody Associates had designed a 31-story office and hotel building that was to be cantilevered over the theater, with an entrance carved out of Radio City's Sixth Avenue lobby. The office building was ultimately not built. Robert F. Jani instead assumed control of Radio City's programming, with plans to restore the venue to its original condition. The film-plus-stage-spectacle format ended at the theater on April 25, 1979, with the screening of The Promise. The theater was closed immediately afterward for renovation. It reopened with a ceremony on May 31, 1979.

=== Late 20th century ===
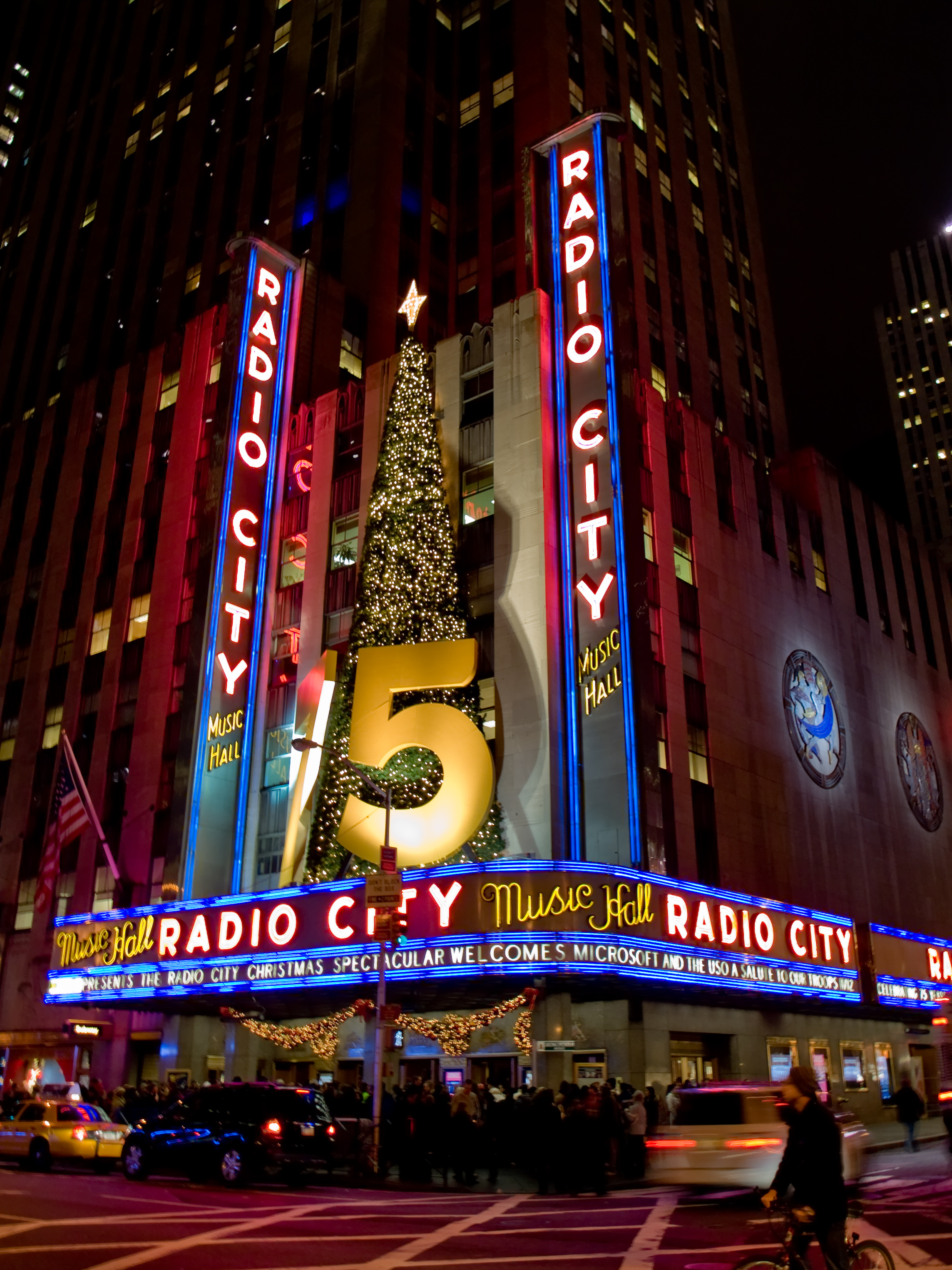
Marquee in January 2008 during the Christmas Spectacular

After the theater reopened to the public, Radio City started creating its own music concerts. Previously, the theater had only hosted events created by external producers. Time slots were set aside for movie screenings, but Radio City had mostly turned to stage shows. By January 1980, Radio City was hosting shows such as the stage adaptation of Snow White and the Seven Dwarfs and the Rockettes Spectacular. However, the theatrical shows proved to be unpopular, so, in 1983, the Radio City Music Hall shifted to creating music concerts and participating in the production of films and TV shows. The parent company, Radio City Music Hall Productions (a subsidiary of Rockefeller Center Inc.), started creating or co-creating films and Broadway shows such as Legs and Brighton Beach Memoirs.

By the early 1980s, the LPC was considering designating the original Rockefeller Center complex as a city landmark, including the exterior of Radio City Music Hall. In 1983, the LPC held hearings to determine how much of Rockefeller Center should be protected as a landmark. The Rockefeller family and Columbia University acknowledged that the buildings were already symbolically landmarks, but their spokesman John E. Zuccotti recommended that only the block between 49th and 50th Streets be protected. (Note: Namely 1250 Avenue of the Americas, 30 Rockefeller Plaza, the British Empire Building, La Maison Francaise, the Channel Gardens, and the Lower Plaza) By contrast, almost everyone else who supported Rockefeller Center's landmark status recommended that the entire complex be landmarked. The LPC granted landmark status to the exteriors of all of the original complex's buildings, including the previously unprotected exterior of Radio City Music Hall, on April 23, 1985. (Note: The final exterior landmark designation covers 12 buildings as well as the Channel Gardens, Rockefeller Plaza, and Lower Plaza. These are 1230, 1250, and 1270 Avenue of the Americas; 1, 10, 30, 50, and 75 Rockefeller Plaza; the British Empire Building; the International Building; and La Maison Francaise. Radio City Music Hall was also added as an exterior landmark, and the lobbies of the International Building and 30 Rockefeller Plaza were also protected.) Rockefeller Center's original buildings also became a National Historic Landmark in 1987.

Radio City finally recorded a net gain of $2.5 million in 1985, its first profit in three decades. This was partly attributed to the addition of music concerts, which appealed toward younger viewers. Radio City also started hosting televised events including the Grammy Awards, the Tony Awards, the Daytime Emmy Awards, the MTV Video Music Awards, and the NFL draft. (Note: The Grammys, which alternated between New York City and Hollywood, were moved to Hollywood in 2004, as have been the Daytime Emmys, off and on, since 2006.) A new golden curtain was installed at the main stage in January 1987. The curtain was the third one to be installed since Radio City's opening in 1932; it had last been replaced in 1965. Because of Radio City's historic status, the curtain had to be the same style, texture, and color as the previous curtains.

In 1997, Radio City was leased to the Madison Square Garden Company (then known as Cablevision), providing funding to keep the Rockettes and the Christmas Spectacular at Radio City. In exchange, Cablevision would be able to renovate and manage the theater. Radio City was closed on February 16, 1999, for a comprehensive renovation. During the closure, many components were cleaned, modernized, or replaced, including the curtains, seats, carpets, doorknobs, and light fixtures. Workers installed a gold-silk curtain measuring 112 feet (34 m) wide, as well as 5,901 seats upholstered in salmon-colored fabric. The ceiling was also restored by John Canning. The renovation was originally projected to cost $25 million, but the cost increased to $70 million due to various additional tasks that surfaced during the extensive refurbishment. Radio City received a $2.5 million tax break from the Empire State Development Corporation, which was meant to accommodate the expenditure of up to $66 million in renovation costs. The theater reopened with a gala concert on October 4, 1999.

=== Early 21st century ===
Radio City Music Hall announced a decision to remain open on March 12 and 13, 2020, amid a ban on gatherings of 500 or more in response to the COVID-19 pandemic in New York City. This decision initially stood in contrast to many other venues and public events in New York City, which had shut down. Radio City decided to remain closed after March 13, with no set reopening date, since other venues had also closed indefinitely. This affected events like the 74th Tony Awards, originally scheduled for June 7 but was then postponed after Radio City's closure. In early 2021, New York governor Andrew Cuomo announced that Radio City would be able to open with limited capacity that April. Cuomo subsequently announced Radio City would reopen that June, without capacity limits or mask restrictions, but only to patrons who had received a COVID-19 vaccine.

Development firm Tishman Speyer submitted proposals to the LPC to construct a 24,000-square-foot (2,200 m^{2}) rooftop terrace on Radio City Music Hall, as well as a pedestrian bridge to 1270 Avenue of the Americas. These plans dated from an original proposal for the theater that was never carried out. The LPC approved the plans in March 2021. At the time, the terrace was scheduled to open in late 2021 and would only be usable by tenants of 1270 Avenue of the Americas and their guests. The garden opened in September 2021 and is formally known as Radio Park. Designed by the firm of HMWhite, Radio Park includes birch trees, a set of bleachers, and various pathways. The entirety of Radio Park is placed on a gradual slope because the connection to 50 Rockefeller Plaza is higher than Radio City Music Hall's roof. In October 2025, MSG Entertainment announced that it would spend $7 million upgrading Radio City's sound system with a spatial audio system.

== Architecture ==
=== Facade ===
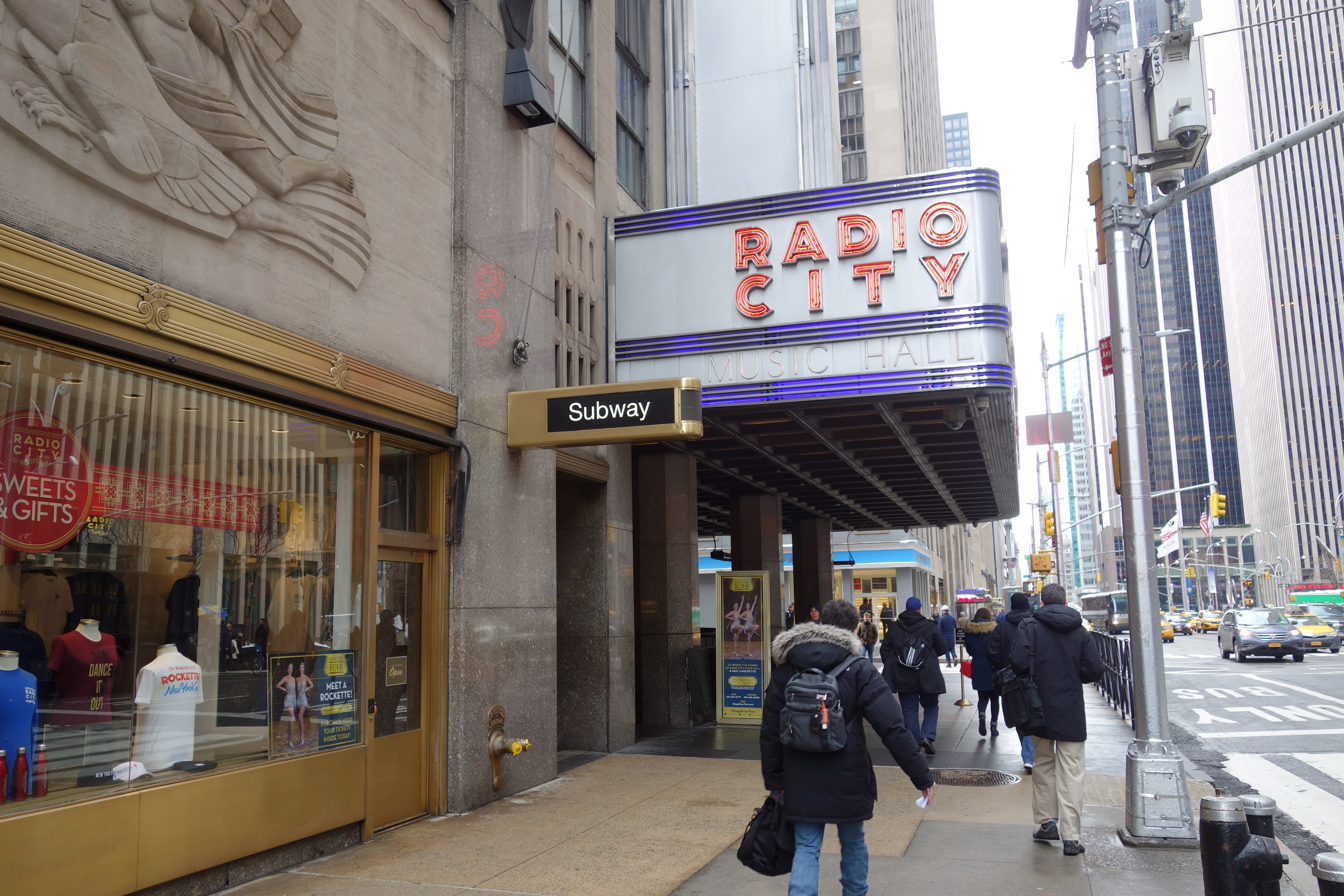
Marquee seen from north, with subway entrance at left

Radio City Music Hall is on the east side of Sixth Avenue between 50th and 51st Streets. Located in a niche partially under 1270 Avenue of the Americas, the theater is housed under the building's first setback on the seventh floor. An entrance to the New York City Subway's 47th–50th Streets–Rockefeller Center station, served by the B, D, F, <F>, and M trains, is on Sixth Avenue directly adjacent to the north end of the marquee, within the same structure that houses Radio City Music Hall.

Its exterior has a long marquee sign that wraps around the corner of Sixth Avenue and 50th Street, as well as narrower, seven-story-high signs on the north and south ends of the marquee's Sixth Avenue side; both signs display the theater's name in neon letters. The main entrance to Radio City was placed at the corner of Sixth Avenue and 50th Street, underneath the marquee. Although the theater's main entrance could have been placed anywhere along the Sixth Avenue frontage, the architects chose to place the entrance near the intersection of 50th Street, rather than in the middle of the block, because it was highly visible from the Broadway theater district to the west. Additionally, a corner site allowed the architects to place more doorways on the facade than a midblock site would have.

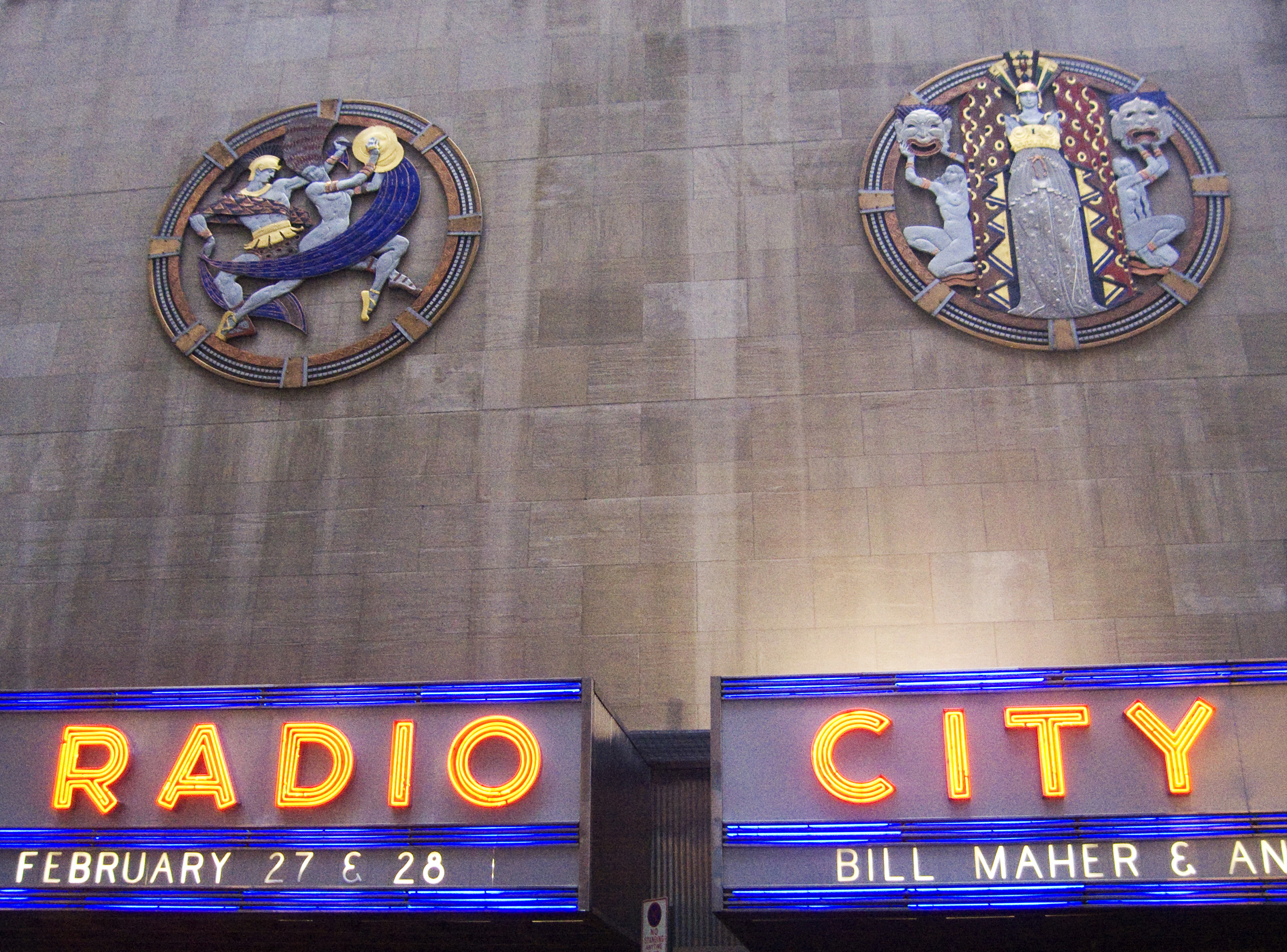
Plaques

The theater's exterior also has visual features signifying its purpose. Above the entrance, Hildreth Meiere created six small bronze plaques of musicians playing different instruments, as well as three larger metal and enamel plaques signifying dance, drama, and song; these plaques denote the theater's theme. At one point, a tennis court was located on the theater's rooftop garden.

=== Interior ===
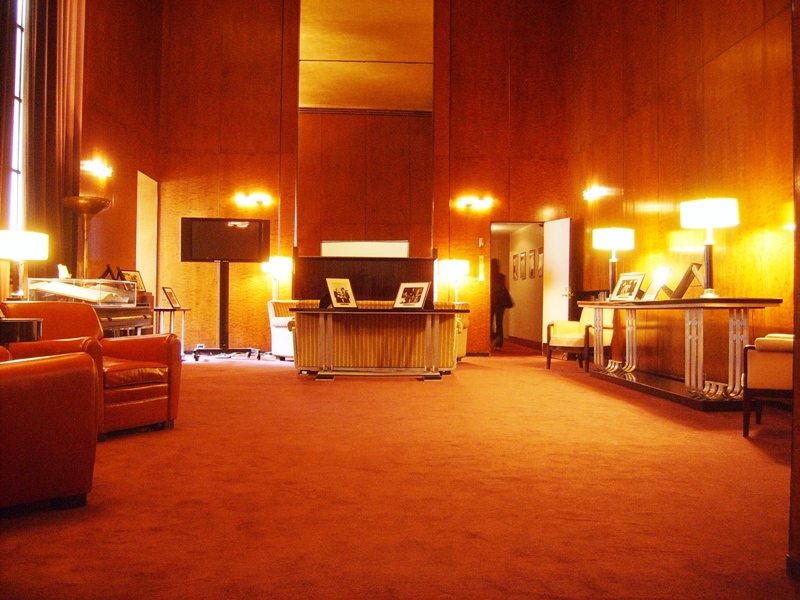
VIP room ("The Roxy Suite")

The interior contains a grand foyer, a large main auditorium, and stairs and elevators that lead to several mezzanines. Designed by Edward Durell Stone, the theater had Art Deco decoration, whose sharp lines represented a break with the traditional ornate rococo ornament associated with movie palaces at the time. Donald Deskey coordinated the interior design process and designed some of the wallpaper, furniture, and other decor in Radio City. Deskey's geometric Art Deco designs incorporate glass, aluminum, chrome, bakelite, and leather; these materials are used in the theater's wall coverings, carpet, light fixtures, and furniture. All of the theater's staircases were fitted with brass railings, an aspect of the Art Deco style.

Deskey commissioned textile designers Marguerita Mergentime and Ruth Reeves to create carpet designs and designs for the fabrics covering the walls. Reeves designed a carpet that contained musical motifs in "shades of red, brown, gold, and black", but her design was replaced in 1999. Mergentime also produced geometric designs of nature and musicians for the walls and carpets, which still exist. Deskey also created his own carpet design consisting of "singing head" depictions, which still exists. Rene Chambellan produced six "playful" bronze plaques of vaudeville characters, which are located in the lobby just above the entrances to the theater. Henry Varnum Poor designed all of Radio City's ceramic fixtures, especially the lighting bases.

==== Lobbies and grand foyer ====
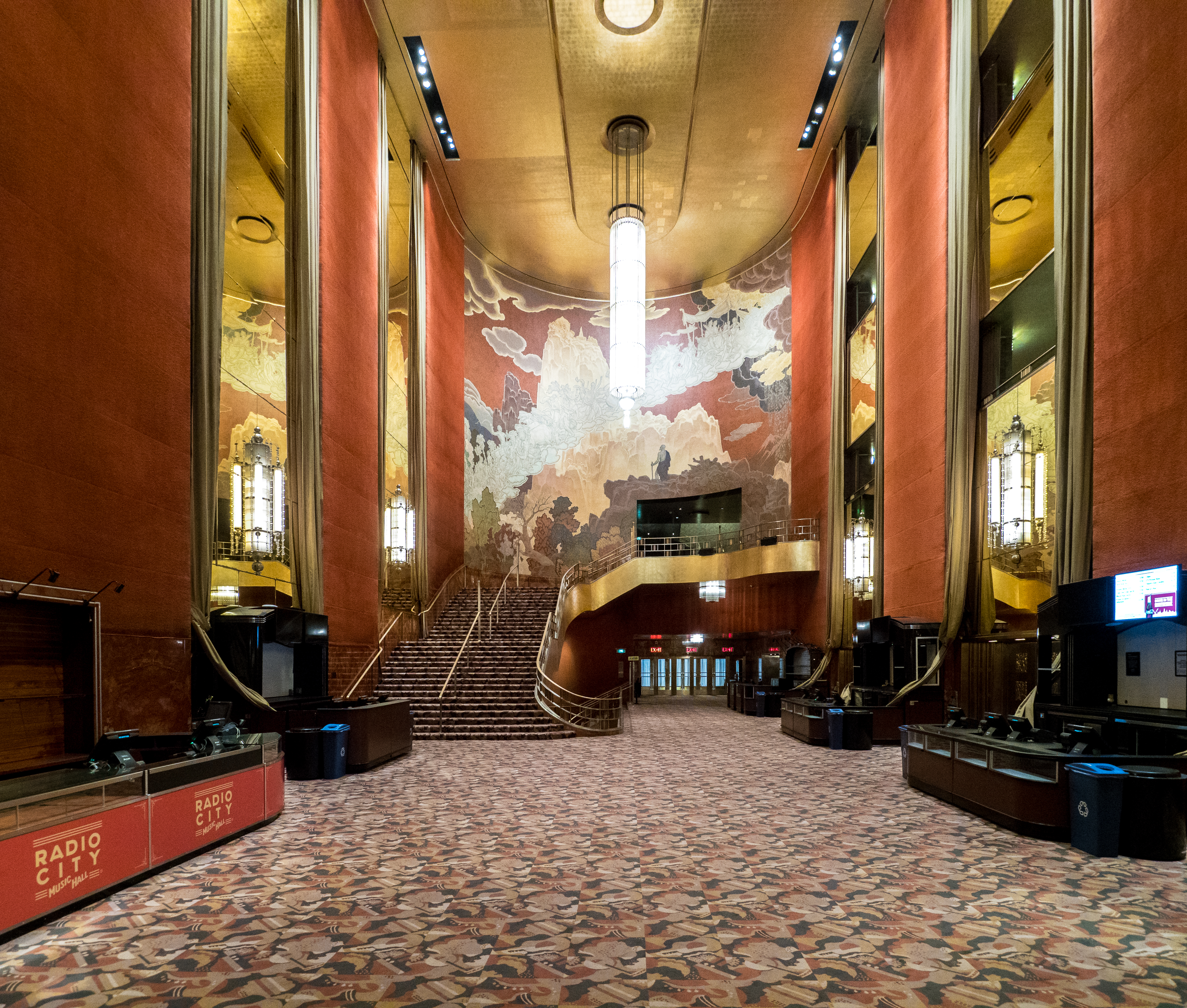
Grand Foyer

The entrance to Radio City is at its southwestern corner, where there are adjacent ticket and advance sales lobbies. Both lobbies contain terrazzo floors and marble walls. The ticket lobby, accessible from Sixth Avenue between 50th and 51st Streets, is the larger of the two lobbies. There are four brass ticket booths: one each on the northern and southern walls and two booths in the center. Originally, six ticket booths were placed about 22 feet (6.7 m) from the main doors, dividing the lobby into corridors measuring 16 feet (4.9 m) wide. This permitted adequate traffic flow within the lobby while also making it difficult for crowds to congregate. Large black pillars support a low, slightly coffered ceiling. Circular light fixtures are set into the ceiling of the ticket lobby, within each of the slight indentations. The advance sales lobby, accessible from 50th Street just east of Sixth Avenue, contains a single ticket booth on the eastern wall. This location allowed the advance-sales booth to be distinguished from the general sales booths while also not blocking traffic flow.

To the ticket lobby's east and the advance sales lobby's northeast is the elliptical grand foyer, whose four-story-high ceiling and dramatic artwork contrast with the compactness of the lobby. The space is about 40 feet (12 m) deep and extends the width of the auditorium. Two long, tubular chandeliers created by Edward F. Caldwell & Co. hang from the ceiling. The northern side of the grand foyer contains Ezra Winter's mural. A grand staircase, leading up to the first-mezzanine foyer, runs along the northern wall next to Winter's mural. Another set of stairs below the grand staircase descends from the northern side of the foyer to the main lounge one level below. A smaller staircase to the first-mezzanine lounge runs along the southern wall, connecting to a curved extension of that level's balcony. The southern and northern sides of the grand foyer, respectively leading to 50th and 51st Streets, contain shallow vestibules with red marble walls. The northern vestibule is used as the exit lobby, while the southern vestibule is an emergency exit. The grand foyer's eastern wall contains openings from the first, second, and third mezzanine levels, and the western wall contains 50-foot-tall (15 m) mirrors within gold frames. Eleven doors leading to Radio City's auditorium are also located on the grand foyer's eastern side. Chambellan commissioned several plaques on the auditorium doors' exteriors, which resemble the vaudeville representations in the lobby and depict the types of performances that have taken place at Radio City.

The foyer connects to four elevators that serve the main lounge level through the third mezzanine level. At ground level, a marble lobby for these elevators is to the west of the northern exit vestibule. Chambellan also designed the elevator doors with reliefs of musicians in atypical representations. The maple circular roundels inside the cabs were designed by Edward Trumbull and represent wine, women, and song.

Each of the three mezzanine levels has a men's smoking room, a women's lounge, and men's and women's restrooms. No two restrooms or lounges have the same design. A 1932 New York Times article described the reasons for such varied designs: "Since the auditoriums, men's lobbies, smoking rooms and women's lounges are used for a few hours only, decorative schemes are appropriate in them that would be too dramatic for a home."

==== Auditorium ====
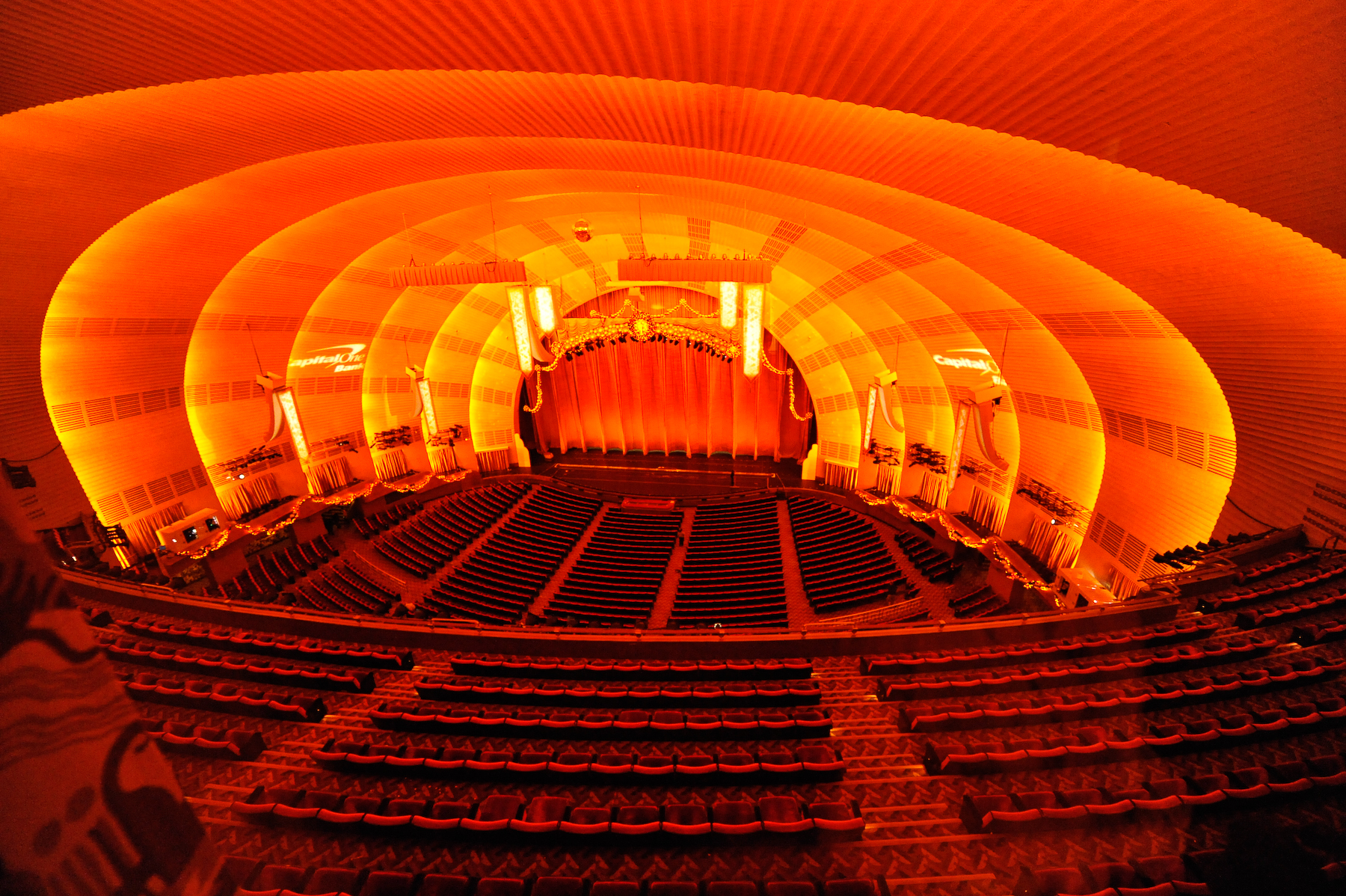
View of stage and orchestra seating from mezzanine seating

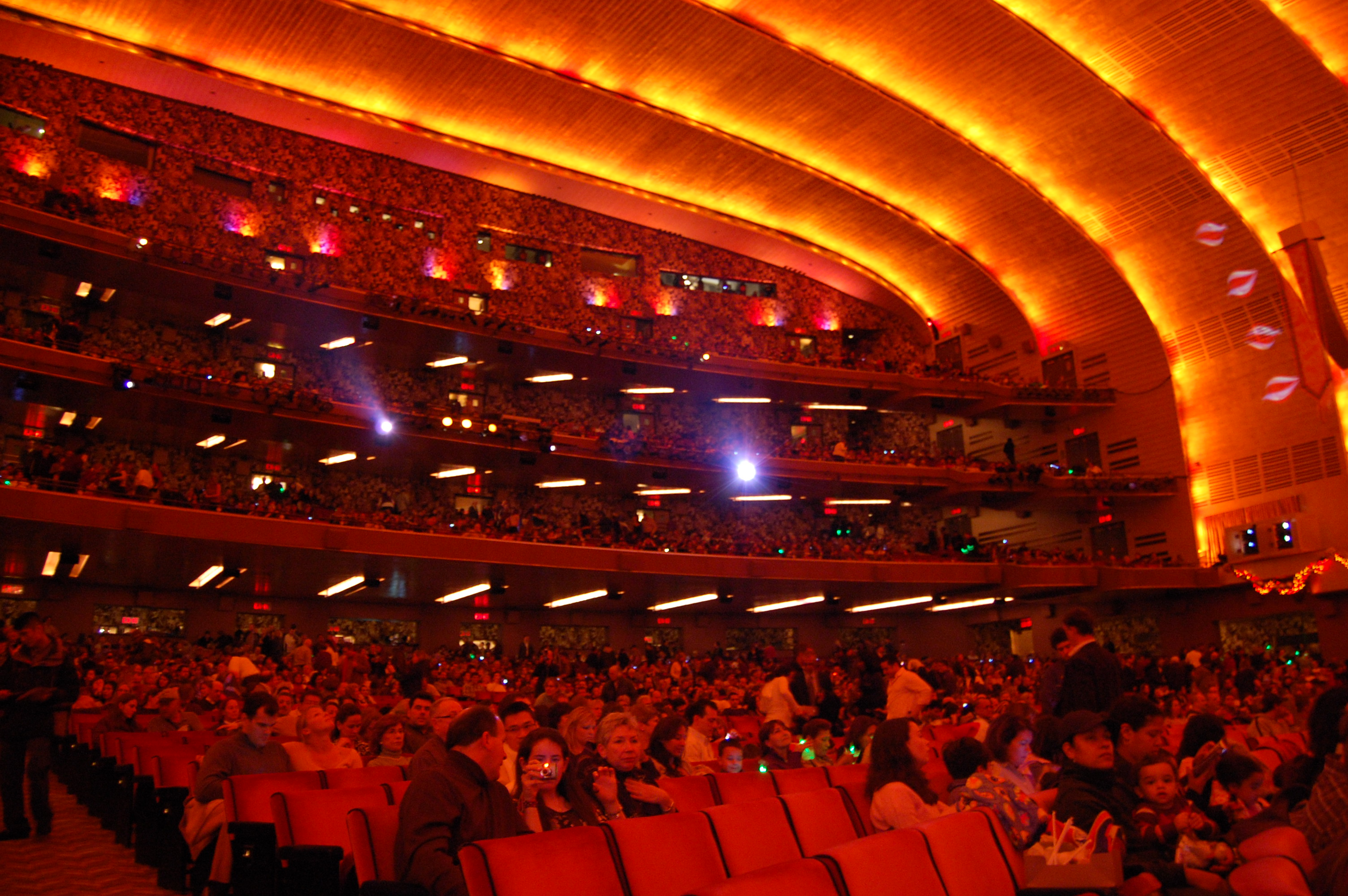
View of mezzanine balconies from orchestra seating

Architectural critic Douglas Haskell said of the auditorium: "The focus is the great proscenium arch, over 60 feet [18 m] high and 100 feet [30 m] feet wide, a huge semi-circular void. From that the energy disperses, like a firmament the arched structure rises outward and forward. The 'ceiling', uniting sides and top in its one great curve, proceeds by successive broad bands, like the bands of northern lights." In the theater's early years, the Federal Writers' Project noted that "nearly everything about the Music Hall is tremendous". At the time, Radio City had the world's largest orchestra; the most expansive theater screen; the heaviest proscenium arch in a theater; and the "finest precision dancers", the Rockettes.

===== Seating areas =====
The auditorium has around 5,960 seats. Around 3,500 of these seats are at the ground-level orchestra, while the remaining seats are distributed among the three mezzanines. The orchestra and mezzanine sections all contain reddish-brown plush seating throughout, as well as storage compartments under each seat, lights at the end of each row of seats, and more legroom space than in other theaters. Six aisles extend the length of the orchestra level, dividing each row into sections of up to 14 seats. The aisles measure 6 feet 3 inches (1.91 m) wide at the rear, tapering to 5 feet 10 inches (1.78 m) at the center and 3 feet 4 inches (1.02 m) at the front. A crossover aisle separates the front one-third of the orchestra from the rear two-thirds. Each row of seats was originally placed 2 feet 10 inches (0.86 m) apart, giving more legroom than in contemporary theaters.

Radio City contains three mezzanines within the back wall of the auditorium, as well as a main lounge in the basement. Each of the mezzanines is shallow, and all three mezzanine levels are stacked on top of the rear orchestra. Since the mezzanines are shallow, there is no need to have a crossover aisle, and only four aisles are provided. Ramps on either side of the stage lead to the first mezzanine level, creating the impression of a stage encircling the orchestra.

===== Other design features =====
The auditorium's ceiling contains eight telescoping bands, which Haskell described as the "northern lights". Each of the bands' edges contains a 2-foot (0.61 m) overlap with the next band, placed at 30-foot (9.1 m) intervals. In Joseph Urban's original plans, the ceiling was to be coffered but, after the cancellation of the Opera House, designers proposed many different designs for the proposed Music Hall's ceiling. The current design was put forth by Raymond Hood, who derived his band-system idea from a book that Urban had written. The arches are made of plaster and contain ridges every 6 feet (1.8 m). The original plans had been to build the arches themselves in a curved shape, but this would have concentrated the sound onto several small spots. The walls are covered by intricate fabric silhouette patterns of performers and horses, which were created by Reeves. The radiating arches of the proscenium unite the large auditorium, allowing a sense of intimacy and grandeur. The ceiling arches also contain grilles that camouflage the air-conditioning system, amplifying equipment, and organ pipes. The sound system could be controlled by a light organ in front of the orchestra pit.

The Great Stage, designed by Peter Clark, measures 66.5 by 144 ft (20.3 by 43.9 m); (Note: One source gives a width of 110 feet (34 m) and a depth of 60 feet (18 m).) it is placed within a proscenium arch that resembles a setting sun. Roxy reportedly envisioned the sunset design of the stage while traveling home from Europe on an ocean liner. There are two stage curtains; the main one is made of steel and asbestos, which can part horizontally, while the plush curtain behind it has several horizontal sections that can be raised or lowered independently of each other. The original curtain weighed three tons and measured 112 feet (34 m) wide by 78 feet (24 m) tall. The center of the stage contains a turntable measuring 50 feet (15 m) across. The floor is divided into three 70 ft sections that can be lowered and raised either separately or in sync. The orchestra pit, which could fit 75 musicians, is placed on a "bandwagon" that can be lifted from the basement and could move vertically or longitudinally. The bandwagon could also be lifted to the central opening. From the stage, it could be lowered back into the basement or moved to the side. In 2001, the stage was designated as a Historic Mechanical Engineering Landmark.

There is a complex system of indirect cove lighting at the front of the stage, facing the audience. When Radio City first opened, it was equipped with all of the newest lighting innovations at the time, including lights that changed colors automatically and adjusted their own brightness based on different lighting levels in the theater.

==== Main lounge ====
The main lounge in the basement is about twice the size of the grand foyer above it. The walls are composed of black "permatex", which was a new material at the time of Radio City's construction. The ceiling has diamond-shaped light fixtures and is supported by six diamond-shaped piers, as well as three full-height piers of a similar shape that exist only for aesthetic purposes. The lounge is decorated with several artworks (see § Art). Deskey also designed the chrome furniture and the carpeting of the lounge. The lounge also contained a passageway to the "Forum", along Sixth Avenue between 49th and 50th Streets, where it linked with Rockefeller Center's other buildings.

The landing for Radio City's elevator bank is located on the northern side of the main lounge. A marble wall with three large columns comprises the western side of the lounge. A hallway extends off the eastern side of the lounge and leads to a men's smoking room and a women's lounge, which both connect to restrooms of their respective genders. The smoking room has a masculine theme with terrazzo floors, brown walls, and copper ceilings. The accompanying men's restroom has black-and-white tiles and simple geometric fixtures, which are duplicated in the men's restrooms on each mezzanine level. The women's lounge is mostly designed with the same soft colors as Witold Gordon's "History of Cosmetics Mural", located on the room's walls, although the wall area not covered by the mural is painted beige. The attached women's restroom is similar to the men's restroom on the same floor but contains vertical cylindrical lighting, stools, and circular mirrors above aqua sinks.

==== Offstage ====
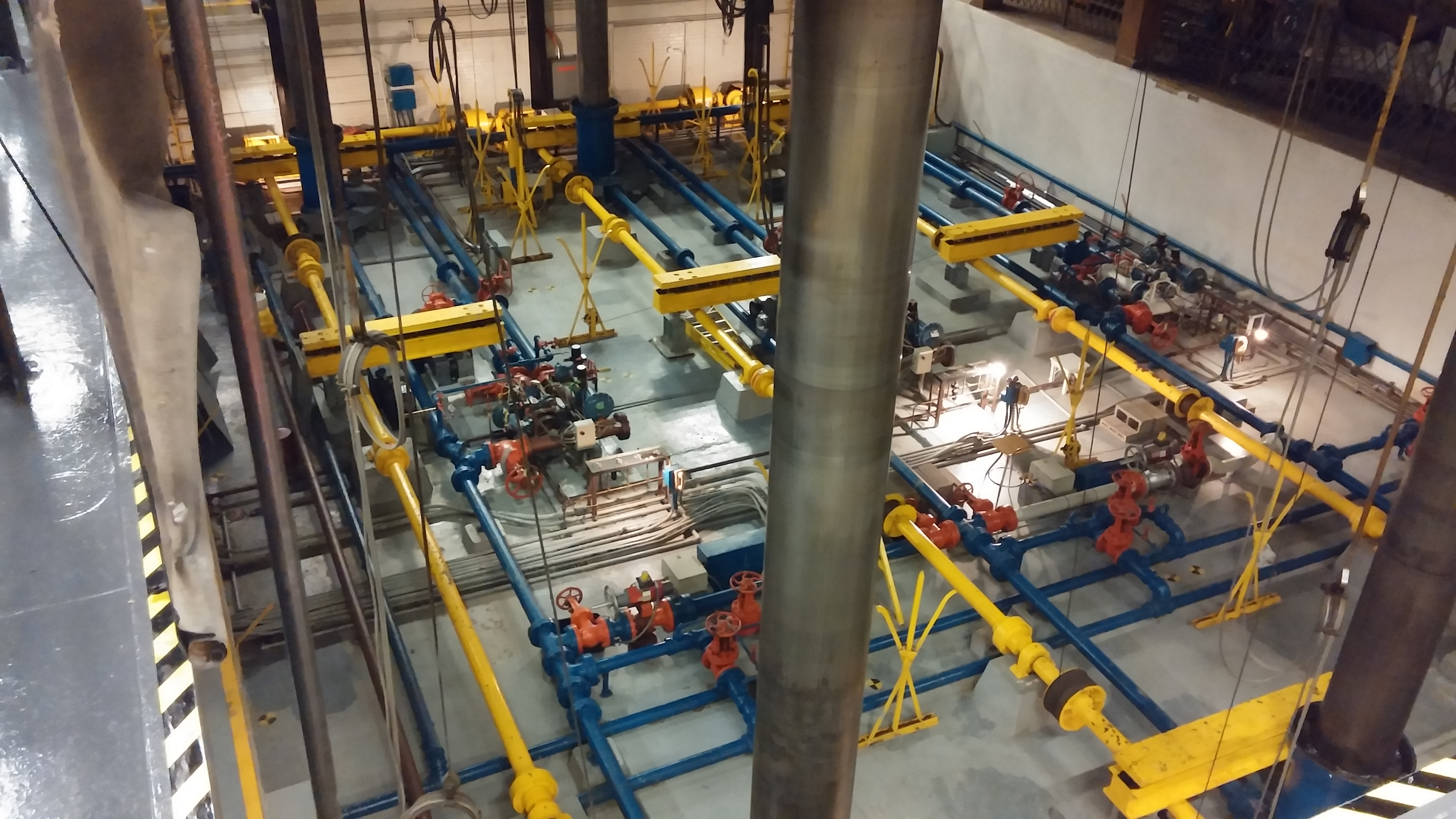
Backstage hydraulic system

The offstage area of Radio City contains many rooms that allow all productions to be prepared on-site. The offstage rooms include a carpenter's studio, a scene shop, sewing rooms, dressing rooms for 600 people, a green room for performers' guests, and a dormitory. Two elevators are placed on either side of the stage, as well as a circular staircase. The female performers' restrooms and dressing rooms are placed as close as possible to the stage, and the male performers' dressing rooms are placed on the opposite side of the stage. This was in conformance with Roxy's belief that "happy performers make successful shows". Above the auditorium were two studios for Roxy, as well as a broadcast studio, rehearsal room, and two preview rooms.

The elevator system was designed by Peter Clark and built by Otis Elevators. The elevator system was so advanced that the U.S. Navy incorporated identical hydraulics in constructing World War II aircraft carriers; according to Radio City lore, during the war, government agents guarded the basement to hide the U.S. Navy's technological advantage.

=== Art ===
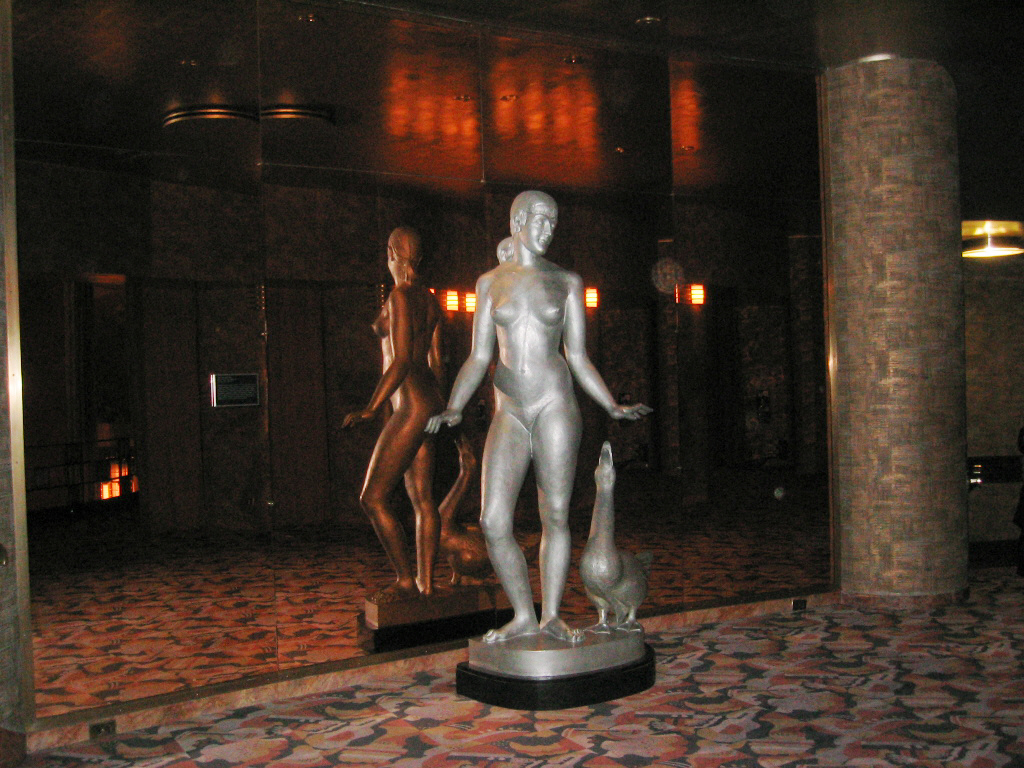
"Goose Girl", by sculptor Robert Laurent

The public areas of Radio City feature the work of many Depression-era artists, who were commissioned by Deskey as part of his general design scheme. The large 2,400-square-foot (220 m^{2}) mural in the grand foyer, "Quest for the Fountain of Eternal Youth", was painted by Ezra Winter and depicts a fable from a Native American tribe in Oregon. The murals on the wall of the grand lounge, which depict five eras of differing theater scenes, are collectively known as the "Phantasmagoria of the Theater" by Louis Bouche. Three female nudes cast in aluminum were commissioned for the theater, but Roxy thought that they were inappropriate for a family venue. Although the Rockefellers loved the sculptures, the only one that was displayed on opening night was "Goose Girl" by Robert Laurent, which is located on the first mezzanine and depicts a nude aluminum girl beside a slender aluminum goose. Since opening night the other two sculptures have been put on display at Radio City. "Eve" by Gwen Lux is displayed in the southwest corner of the grand foyer, and "Spirit of the Dance" by William Zorach is visible from the grand lounge.

Each of the public restrooms have adjoining lounges that display various works of art. The third-floor women's restroom contains the Panther Mural by Henry Billings, which is accompanied by Deskey's abstract wall coverings in the women's lounge. The women's lounge on the second mezzanine houses Yasuo Kuniyoshi's oil painting of "larger-than-life botanical designs" along the entire wall, which had originally been commissioned by Georgia O'Keeffe before she suffered a nervous breakdown and left the mural incomplete. Deskey created a wall covering for the men's lounge on the second mezzanine, containing masculine icons and nicotine motifs. He also designed the first-mezzanine women's lounge, a room full of mirrors with a blue-and-white carpet and frosted low-intensity lights. Witold Gordon painted a map with caricatures and stereotypical motifs in the men's lounge on the same floor, as well as a "History of Cosmetics Mural" in the women's lounge in the basement. Stuart Davis created Men Without Women, a mural of masculine stereotypical pastimes in the basement-level men's lounge; (Note: The mural was originally unnamed, but the Rockefeller Center Art Committee named it Men Without Women, after the Ernest Hemingway short-story collection that had been published the same year of the mural's commission.) the work was donated to the Museum of Modern Art in 1975 and loaned back to Radio City in 1999. Finally, Edward Buk Ulreich created a "Wild West Mural" on the third-mezzanine men's lounge.

=== Organs ===
Radio City Music Hall has two Wurlitzer theatre organs. The organ in the main theatre is the largest instrument built by the Wurlitzer company. It consists of 58 ranks of pipes and 4,178 pipes, played from twin 4-manual consoles located to the left and right of the stage, which permits two organists to play the instrument simultaneously. The broadcast booth atop the theatre contains a smaller (3-manual, 14 rank) Wurlitzer organ, although it has been unplayable for some time. Richard Leibert was Radio City's chief organist from its opening on December 27, 1932, until his retirement in 1971, at which time Raymond Bohr succeeded him. Both organs have been recorded extensively by Ashley Miller, Dick Leibert, Raymond Bohr, and Eddie Layton, and Leibert presented a daily program of organ music broadcast from the theater on the NBC Radio Network in the 1930s and 1940s.

== Notable events ==
=== Music and shows ===
Under conductor Ernö Rapée, from 1932 to 1942, there were weekly broadcasts of live concerts from Radio City on the NBC Blue Network radio program Radio City Music Hall of the Air. On October 8, 1939, Radio City's symphony orchestra performed the world premiere of Eugene Zador's opera Christopher Columbus for national radio broadcast on Radio City Music Hall of the Air. Originally the work was supposed to be performed on the stage of Radio City, but ticket sales were so strong that the production moved to the larger Center Theatre but with Radio City's artistic leaders and performers still attached.

The Grateful Dead played eight shows over nine days in October 1980, culminating on Halloween; two of the shows from this run were released as the video Grateful Dead: Dead Ahead. In the 1980s, Liberace grossed $2.5 million from 14 performances with a combined audience of 82,000, setting a box-office record for Radio City Music Hall at the time. Adele performed a one-night-only concert at Radio City, which was recorded on November 17, 2015, and broadcast on NBC on December 14, 2015. On July 23–24, 2018, Britney Spears performed at Radio City as part of her Piece of Me Tour.

The Radio City Christmas Spectacular is an annual Christmas stage musical produced by MSG Entertainment, which operates the theater. A New York Christmas tradition since 1933, it features the women's precision dance team known as the Rockettes. The Irish dance show Riverdance made its North American debut at Radio City in March 1996, breaking box-office records. In 2026, the New York Philharmonic symphony orchestra gave its first-ever performance at Radio City.

=== Television ===
On several occasions between 1987 and 2008, Radio City Music Hall has been used for televised game shows such as Hollywood Squares, Wheel of Fortune and Jeopardy!. For two weeks in November 1988, the theater hosted Wheel of Fortune, which was taking its first road trip. Saturday Night Live announcer Don Pardo announced during the two weeks. Radio City Music Hall was also the site for Jeopardy!'s four-thousandth episode in May 2002, at which time the show's Million Dollar Masters invitational tournament also occurred. The theater hosted the show again in November 2007 for the nighttime show's 25th anniversary. Radio City was used again in November 2006 for a 2-week Celebrity Jeopardy! event.

David Letterman hosted the Late Night with David Letterman Sixth Anniversary Special at Radio City Music Hall in 1988, and did so again for the show's Tenth Anniversary Special in 1992. The next year, Lyons Group (parent company of Barney & Friends at the time), taped a live stage show called Barney Live! In New York City at the theater. In February 1998, Radio City Music Hall was a setting for the Sesame Street music special Elmopalooza, with Jon Stewart, David Alan Grier and others with the cast of Sesame Street and the Muppets.

In October 2001, the concert Come Together: A Night for John Lennon's Words and Music was simulcast live from the theater on The WB and TNT. The concert had been delayed following the September 11 attacks the month before.

In 2013, it was announced that America's Got Talent would hold its live shows from the Radio City Music Hall starting with its eighth season that summer; it had held its live shows at the New Jersey Performing Arts Center for its seventh season to accommodate new judge Howard Stern. The move was also intended to take advantage of New York tax credits. AGT would broadcast its live rounds from Radio City Music Hall until Stern's departure in 2016, after which the show moved to the Dolby Theatre in Los Angeles.

=== Sports ===
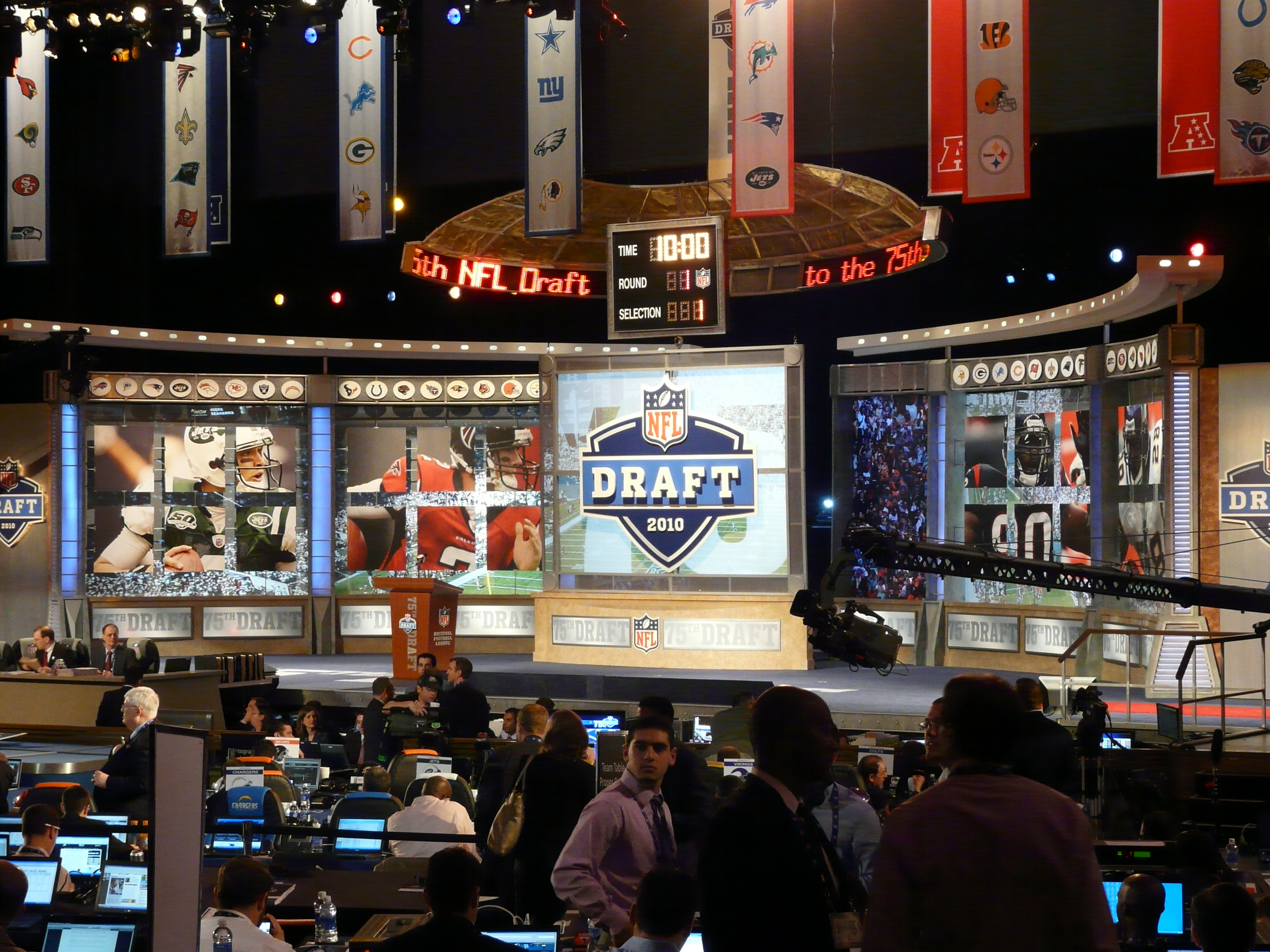
The set for the 2010 NFL draft at Radio City Music Hall

The first sports event at Radio City Music Hall was a boxing card headlined by Roy Jones Jr. and David Telesco that took place on January 15, 2000. On April 13, 2013, Nonito Donaire faced Guillermo Rigondeaux in a boxing card held at Radio City Music Hall.

In 2004, the WNBA's New York Liberty played six home games at Radio City while their then-regular home, Madison Square Garden, prepared to host the 2004 Republican National Convention. The Liberty played their first game in front of 5,945 fans against the Detroit Shock in July 2004. Courtside seats were stage left and stage right along the baseline and the Rockettes performed at halftime. The court from Madison Square Garden was moved to Radio City Music Hall during this time.

Radio City Music Hall was the site of the NFL draft between 2006 and 2014. Prior to being held at Radio City, the NFL Draft had been hosted at other locations in New York City since 1965, but after the 2014 draft, the National Football League hosted the draft in a series of other cities nationwide.

=== Awards ceremonies ===
The Broadway League presented the Tony Awards, the annual ceremony for Broadway theatre, at Radio City Music Hall during most years from 1997 to 2019, (Note: The awards ceremonies for 2011, 2012, and 2016 were hosted at the Beacon Theatre, another MSG venue. The Gershwin Theatre hosted the 1999 awards.) as well as in 2022 and 2025. Radio City has also hosted the Grammy Awards, the annual ceremony presented by the Recording Academy for music, six times. The theater's first Grammys was in 1980, and its last Grammys was in 1998. The MTV Video Music Awards have been hosted at the theater 12 times from 1984 to 2018.

== Gallery ==
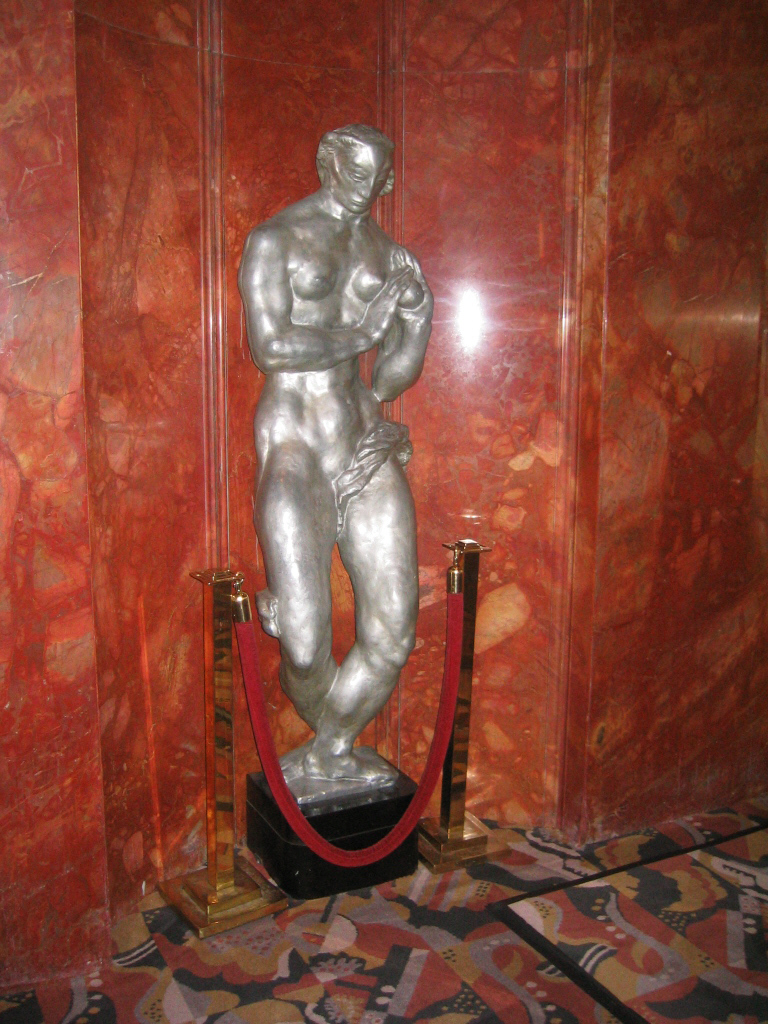
Eve by Gwen Lux in the lobby

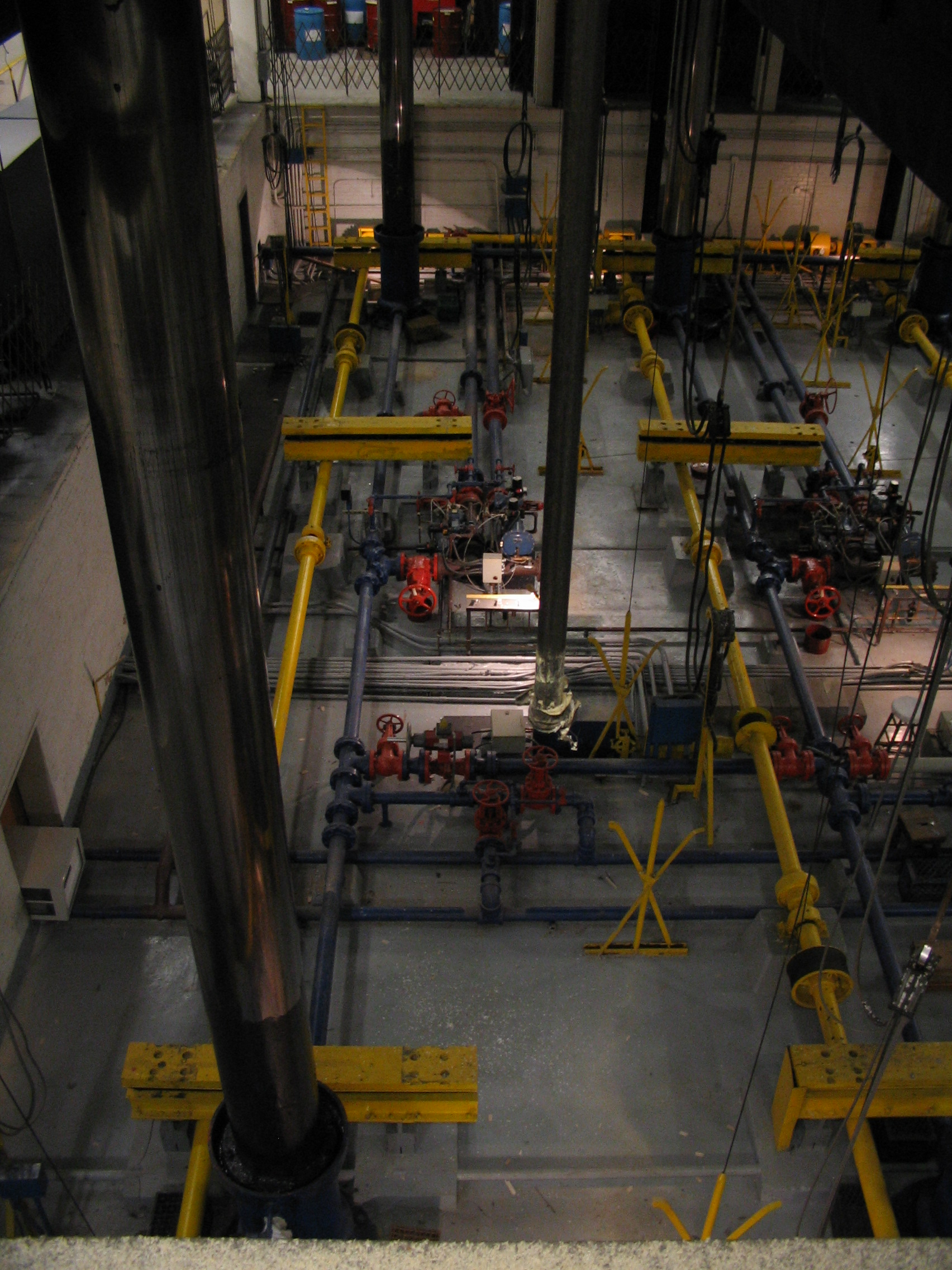
Hydraulics pit beneath the Great Stage

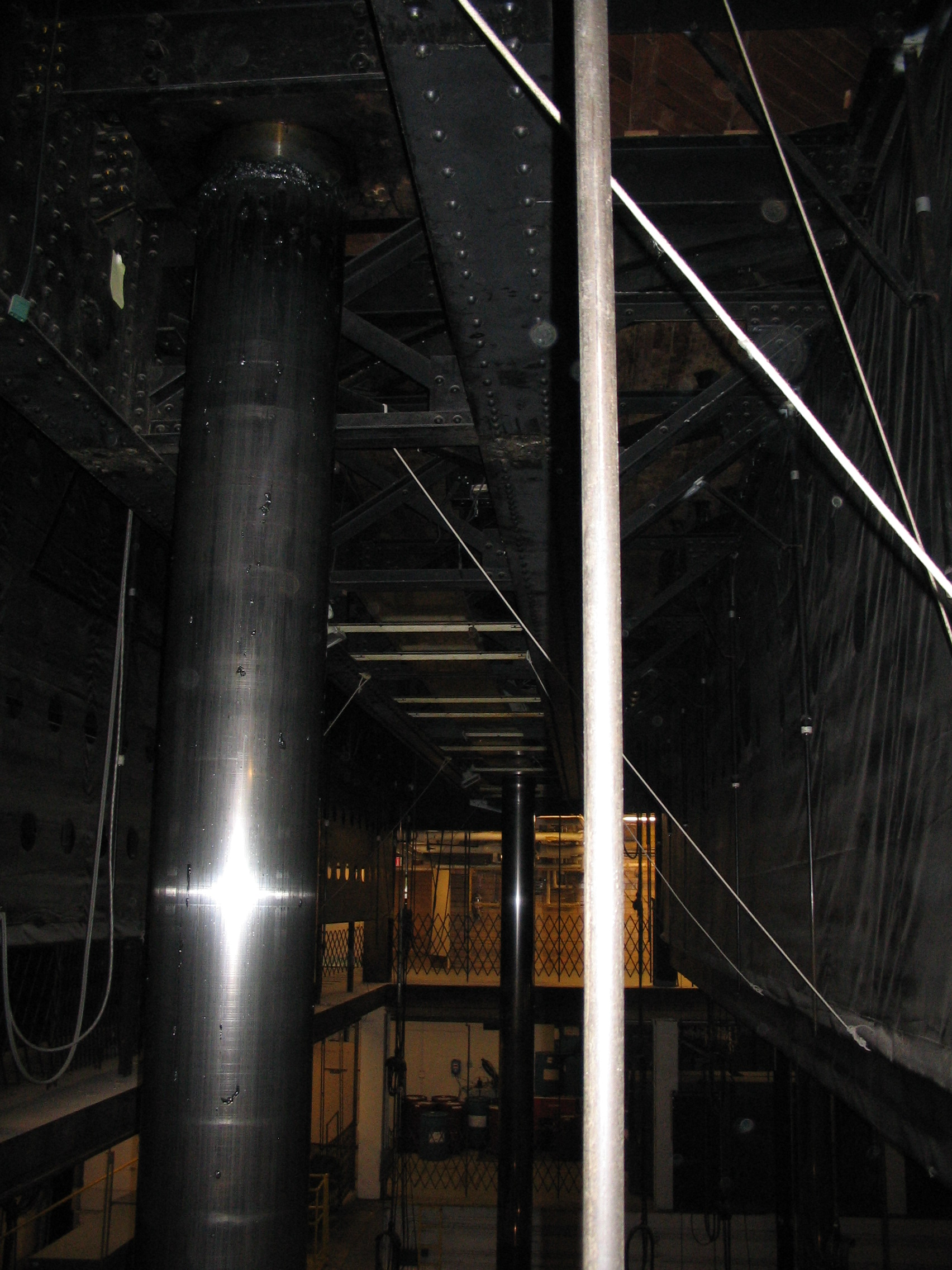
Underside of the Great Stage

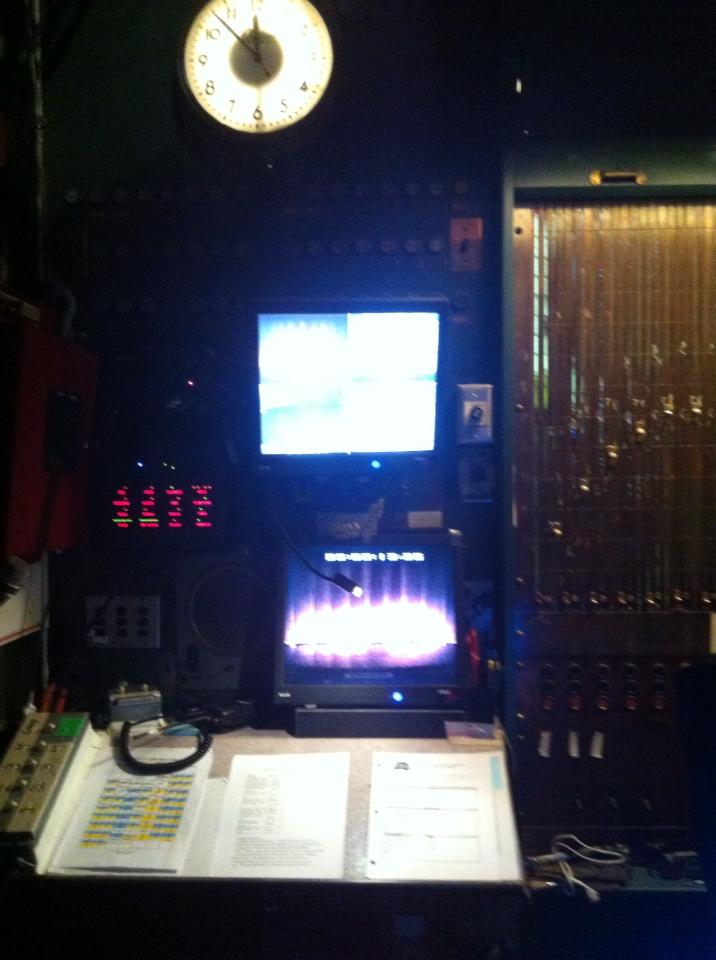
The stage manager's desk

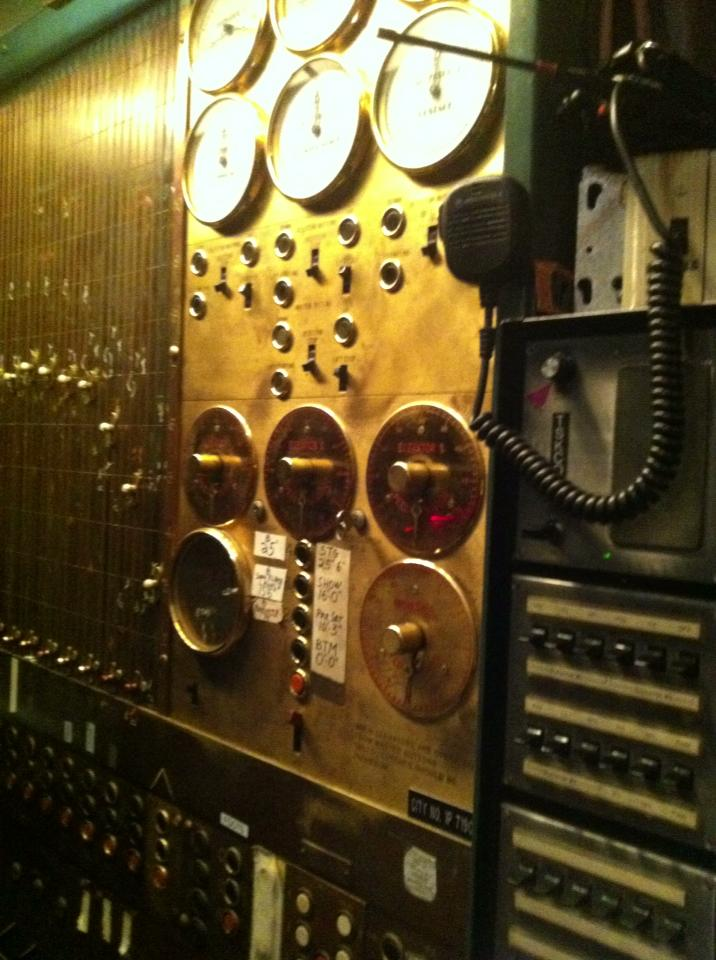
The elevator hydraulics controls

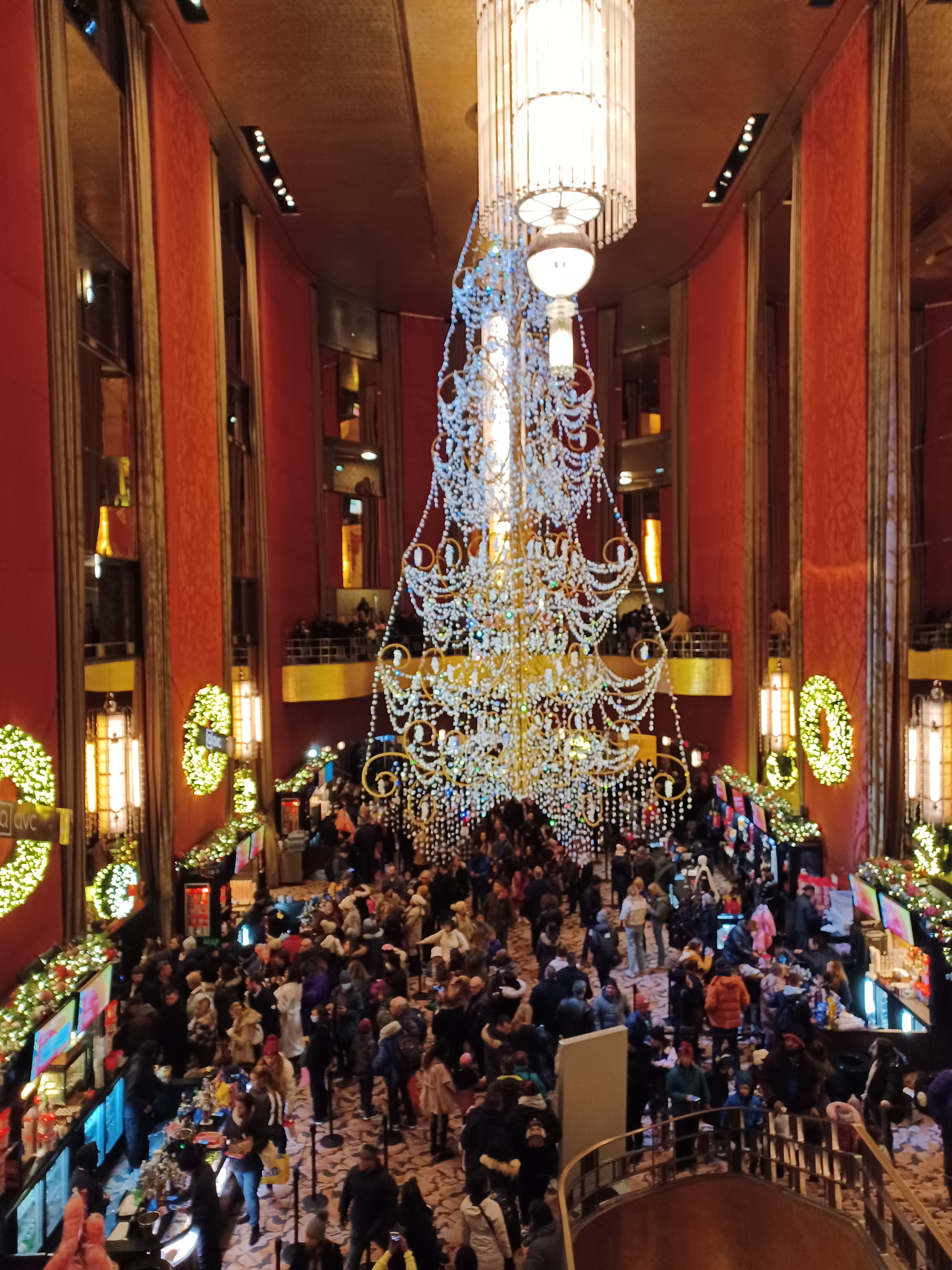
The Grand Foyer with Christmas decorations for the Christmas Spectacular

== See also ==
- Art Deco architecture of New York City
- List of New York City Designated Landmarks in Manhattan from 14th to 59th Streets
- National Register of Historic Places listings in Manhattan from 14th to 59th Streets

| Preceded by Jacob K. Javits Convention Center | Venues of the NFL draft 2006–2014 | Succeeded by Auditorium Theatre |
