= Donald Deskey =

American industrial designer (1894–1989)

- Born: Donald Sidney Deskey; November 23, 1894; Blue Earth, Minnesota
- Died: April 29, 1989 (aged 94); Vero Beach, Florida
- Known for: Industrial design

Donald Sidney Deskey (November 23, 1894 – April 29, 1989) was an American industrial designer.

== Biography ==
Donald Sidney Deskey was born in Blue Earth, Minnesota. He studied architecture at the University of California, but did not follow that profession, becoming instead an artist and a pioneer in the field of Industrial design. He attended the 1925 Exposition Internationale des Arts Décoratifs et Industriels Modernes in Paris, which influenced his approach to design. He went on to establish a design consulting firm in New York City and later the firm of Deskey-Vollmer (in partnership with Phillip Vollmer), which specialized in furniture and textile design. His designs in this era progressed from Art Deco to Streamline Moderne.

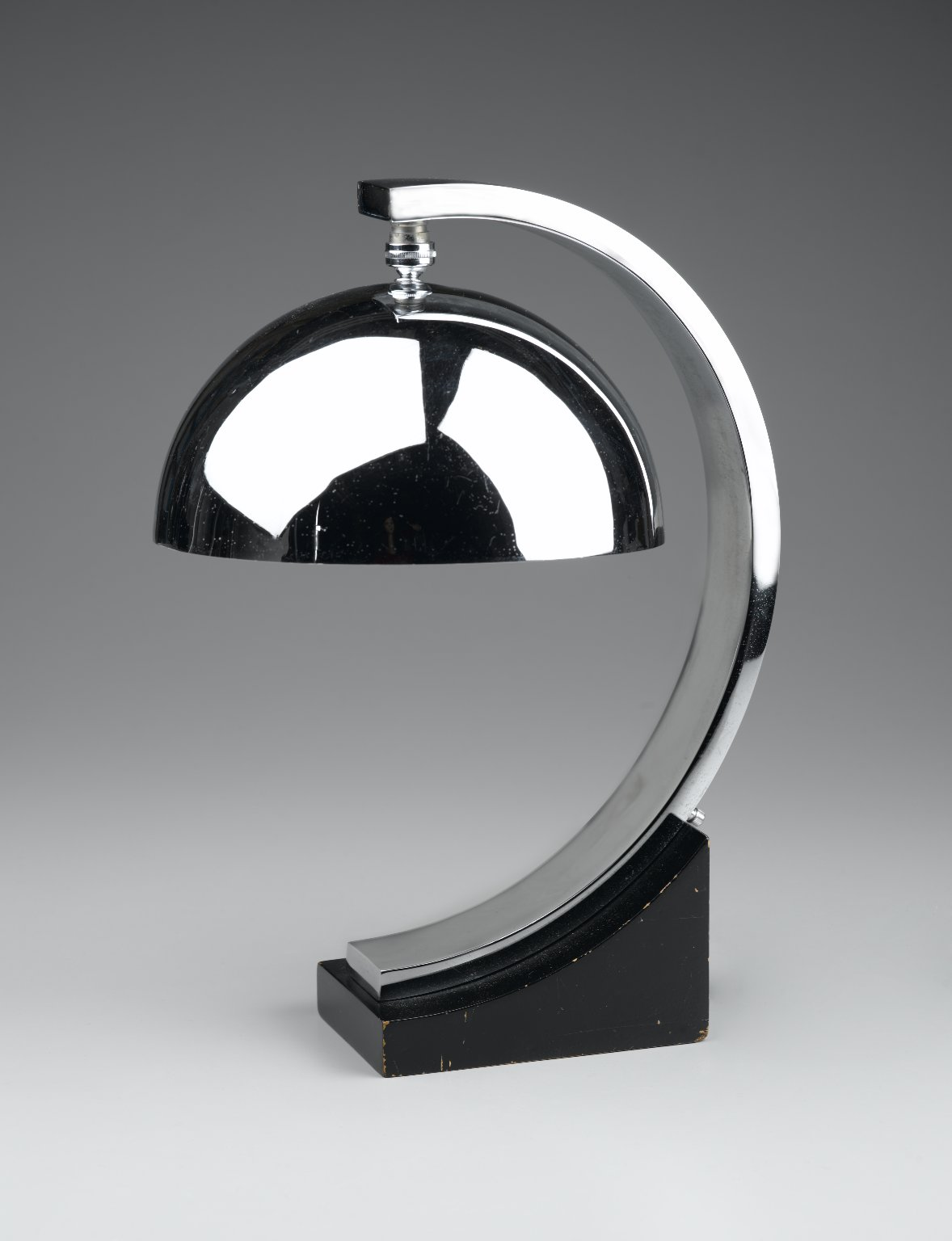
Donald Deskey Table Lamp, 1927-1931

Deskey first gained attention as a designer with his window displays for the Franklin Simon Department Store in Manhattan in 1926. In the 1930s, he won the competition to design Radio City Music Hall's interiors. He also sold geometrically painted objects through the fashionable shop of Rena Rosenthal, and did custom design work for her. In the 1940s, he started the graphic design firm Donald Deskey Associates and made some of the most recognizable icons of the day, including the Crest toothpaste packaging, the Tide bullseye, as well as a widely used New York City lamppost model. In 1940, Deskey developed a decorative form of plywood, which had a unique striated, or combed, look. Produced under the name Weldtex, it became very popular in the 1950s.

His company is still in operation in Cincinnati. A collection of his work is held by the Cooper-Hewitt, National Design Museum. He died in Vero Beach, Florida, the town to which he had retired in 1975.

In 1923, Deskey married Mary Campbell Douthett, a pianist and later professor of music at Juniata College. They had two sons, Michael Douthett Deskey, an architect, and Donald Stephen ("Steve" or D. Stephen) Deskey, a building contractor. In 1952, Deskey married Katharine Godfrey Brennan, who survived him.
