= Anne Poor =

American artist

- Born: January 4, 1918; New York City
- Died: January 12, 2002 (aged 84); Nyack, New York
- Known for: painting
- Website: annepoor.org

Anne Poor (January 4, 1918 – January 12, 2002) was an American artist most known for her paintings and sketches created during World War II, while serving as an official art correspondent in the United States Army. However, Poor's complete oeuvre also consists of still lifes and landscapes created in a range of mediums, including oil, pastel, ink, pencil, and watercolor.

== Overview ==
Poor grew up with accomplished parents. Her mother, Bessie Breuer, was an American journalist, novelist, and playwright, while her stepfather, Henry Varnum Poor, was a successful artist and architect, most involved in murals and sculptures. A third marriage for both Henry Varnum Poor and Bessie Breuer, Poor was subsequently adopted by Henry, while also having a son of their own named Peter, Poor's only sibling.

While in high school, Anne studied at the Arts Students League with well-known artists such as Alexander Brook, William Zorach, and Yasuo Kuniyoshi. During her years of attending Bennington college, she also had the opportunity of studying abroad in Paris at the Académie Julian and the École Fernand Léger as well as working underneath the tutelage of Jean Lurçat and Abraham Rattner.

Once back in the United States, she assisted her father with many mural projects commissioned through New Deal art programs. Assignments included Washington, D.C.'s Department of Justice and Department of Interior buildings, Pennsylvania State University, and the Gleason, Tennessee and Depew, New York post offices.

The 1940s brought new art experiences separate from her father. After a small landscape of hers was accepted in the New York show called "Artists for Victory," Poor wanted to be more directly involved in the war efforts and joined the Women's Army Corps in 1943. Starting as a photo-technician, it was only after much convincing of war department officials that she took an overseas assignment to the Pacific Theater, where it appears most of her time was spent in Manila, Philippines. Poor began an intense period of depicting military life and the evacuations of the wounded for the Air Transport Command.

These military life paintings were later exhibited at the Metropolitan Museum of Art in New York and the National Gallery of Art in Washington, D.C. Her work continued to be awarded and honored through different exhibitions. At the WAC showroom in Rockefeller Center, New York City, Poor exhibited 33 paintings and drawings of bomber crews in action entitled "Men in Flight."

After the conclusion of the war, she came back home to find her father busy establishing the Skowhegan School of Painting and Sculpture, where he would serve as president, teacher, and trustee. After the schools founding, Anne was invited to lecture about her time as a war artist and later stayed on to become a member of the faculty, a director for 15 years, a member of the Boards, and finally, a trustee. In these positions, Poor quickly earned the respect of both faculty and students as they described her efforts as indispensable.

Besides displaying her work in major museums, Poor published a book of drawings depicting Grecian landscape from her two-year trip traversing the countryside of Greece and Italy. Natalia Vogeikoff-Brogan, "Henry Miller's Timeless Greece through the Drawings of Anne Poor," From the Archivist's Notebook, August 1, 2015, Accompanying her drawings was text written by Henry Miller based on memories of his own journey in 1939. It appears they made each other's acquaintance in Paris during Poor's study abroad and continued to keep in touch through the years.

The post-war years brought a renewed interest in landscape painting as seen through numerous renderings of the Hudson River and floral still life's. Her later works focused on interior shots of her home in Rockland County, many showcasing her beloved pet cats.

In 1987 Poor was elected to the American Academy and Institute of Arts and Letters. Membership to this academy is limited to 250 Americans who have made notable achievements in art, literature, and music. Although members rotate in and out with their subsequent deaths, past members are continually remembered and kept alive through their records. Poor's final show took place in 2001, a year before her death, at the Edward Hopper House Art Center in Nyack, New York.

Poor's work is in the collection of the Smithsonian American Art Museum and the Whitney Museum of American Art.

== Artistic career ==
=== Murals ===
In the 1930s, Poor aided her stepfather, Henry Varnum Poor, in painting murals for the United States Justice Department and the Conservation of American Wildlife for the Department of the Interior, located in Washington, D.C. She also assisted him with a commission by the Pennsylvania State University, paying tribute to the university's founding and the evolution of its land-grant mission of teaching, research, and service— completed in 1940.

Poor's skills were recognized independently from her father when she received her own Section of Painting and Sculpture mural commission for the Depew, New York, post office in 1941, and the Gleason, Tennessee, post office in 1942. The mural over the Depew post office is titled Beginning the Day and features a scene of mostly men interacting and conducting business. It has been described by scholar Sylvia Moore that this particular mural showcases Piero della Francesca's influence on Poor with the figures clustered together in small carefully balanced groups.

In Tennessee, the mural Gleason Agriculture was one of the last murals painted in the state for the Treasury Section. The composition illustrates Gleason's sweet potato industry with workers preparing baskets for shipping and the Gleason railroad depot in the background. Poor also painted green leaves around the frame signaling prosperity for the community.

Due to her success in these murals, in 1948 Poor won the Edwin Austin Abbey Memorial Fellowship, which included a grant that enabled her to study in Italy and Greece.

=== World War II ===
The decision to become involved with the war efforts was easily made with her brother and many friends already in the service, as well as both parents aiding in their own way; Henry Varnum Poor was a member of the artist war record project, and Bessie Breuer wrote radio scripts for the Office of War Information.

"I felt that I had been living a rather cloistered life— attending private schools—always surrounded with high-powered people. I wanted to get to know ordinary people, and I wanted to know what the rest of the world was like."

Beginning her service in the Women's Army Corps as a photographic technician at Luke Air Field, Arizona, Poor initiated a drawing class for convalescents at the post hospital. However, in an interview given later in life, Poor lamented that the Army only wanted women to be in secretarial positions, nothing more.

On detached service in New York City, Poor would continue her study of art. Over weekends, she traveled to Washington, D.C., by train, where she used her mother's connections with The Pentagon to further her dreams of being assigned overseas. Bessie Breuer's literary agent, Bernice Baumgarten, happened to be married to James Gould Cozzens, first employed under the U.S. Army Air Forces and then by the USAAF Office of Information Services. He sympathized with Poor's wishes to join a B-29 bombing mission over Tokyo and arranged for her to join under the Women's Army Corps. However, when she arrived at LaGuardia Field to report for duty it was discovered that Oveta Culp Hobby, the director of the WAC, had denied her permission to go abroad due to the lack of toilet facilities for her use on the ship. Instead, Poor was assigned to Fort Totten, a small permanent army installation situated on land across the bay from LaGuardia Field. Although it is not known what her role consisted of during the day, at nights she joined a group of army personnel driving over to Mitchell Field. The group would meet incoming planes loaded with war casualties flown in directly from the Battle of the Bulge— the largest and bloodiest single battle fought by the U.S. in WWII. In her journal, she described the experience of watching the wounded unloaded by forklift, transferred to ambulances headed to the Field Hospital, before finally being transferred to hospitals across the country for more specialized medical treatment. It is here at Mitchel Field that Poor experienced first-hand the atrocities of war. After such nights, she would recreate these experiences in her sketchbook. It was also around this time that Poor had her first painting exhibited, a small landscape of San Francisco, in the 1942 "Artists for Victory" show at the Metropolitan Museum of Art.

It is unclear whether she was officially a part of the Army Art Program with female artists Marion Greenwood, Lucia Wiley, and Doris Rosenthal. However, it seems incredibly likely as her father, Henry Varnum Poor, was the head of the War Art Unit under the Corps of Engineers and led a group of artists in Alaska. Regardless, the Army Art Program ended in 1943 to eliminate what was deemed an unnecessary war expenditure. Instead, Poor's dream of sketching the war abroad was made possible by Fortune magazine and their request for her to illustrate a feature article for the Air Transport Command. In order to be granted the freedom to travel anywhere, at any time, and with no conditions attached, Captain Cunningham had Poor discharged from the Women's Army Corps before she set off to the Pacific Theater.

During this time, Poor began to create her most emotional and thought-provoking works depicting wounded soldiers, makeshift operation rooms, and psychiatric patients suffering from the horrors of war. While in Manila, Philippines, she specifically sketched patients with both physical and psychiatric wounds. Addressing a doctor in charge of the psychiatric ward, he expressed to Poor, "Most people in familiar circumstances can deal with stress, but the emotional trauma of war destroys their ability to cope."

Being rather adventurous, Poor continued her travels to China, a direct disobeyment for leaving her assigned theater of operations. After noticing a group of Chinese soldiers in the Manila Airport terminal, Poor found herself joining the crew. Landing in Kunming after an eventful experience of a failed propeller, the crew asked her to join the rest of their journey of flying around the world, ending in New York. However, Poor turned the offer down, describing how she did not desire to fly The Hump, the eastern end of the Himalayan Mountains, which was extremely dangerous and made more difficult by a lack or absence of reliable charts, radio navigation aids, and weather information.

Once finishing her tour of duty, Poor returned home and submitted all of her work— sketches and paintings– to her boss Lafarge, an officer with the Air Transport Command. However, for reasons unknown, the U.S. Army rejected her work, granting Poor the ability to exhibit and show her wartime creations.

=== Grecian drawings with text by Henry Miller ===
Winning the Edwin Austin Abbey Memorial Fellowship in 1948 for her successful murals allowed Poor to study in both Italy and Greece. She returned from the trip two years later with suitcases full of sketchbooks containing watercolors and ink creations. Although this trip was conducted shortly after the end of WWII, a published book of her Grecian sketches did not come to fruition until 1964 with the collaborative efforts of author Henry Miller. Accompanying Poor's artwork, Miller gave detailed memories coinciding with each illustration. He stated in the book:

Since writing The Colossus of Maroussi, on my return from Greece in 1940, I have never written another line about Greece and probably would not now had I not happened upon these colored drawings of Anne Poor. A glance at these vivid impressions of hers and I feel as if I were reliving my stay in Greece.

It appears that Poor's and Miller's relationship began in Paris, France. In 1937 she studied under painter Abraham Rattner, who happened to be close friends with Miller.

== Styles and influences ==
The time of Poor's mural creations overlapped with her studies at the Art Students League, the Académie Julian, and the École Fernand Léger. It was in these institutions that she was taught classical art techniques and the works of the masters. It appears that Poor used these studies in her ongoing work as seen in the Depew mural— figures clustered in small, carefully balanced groups mimic the work of Piero della Francesca. This blending of knowledge with new subjects continued in her renderings of Pacific air evacuations. As scholar Sylvia Moore points out, the study Restraining Psychotic at Holding Station, completed in a Guam station, resembles a scene from a classical crucifixion cycle.

In consideration of Poor's choice of materials, her life work was rendered through pastels, ink, watercolor, and oil. However, while serving in the army abroad, it appears Poor opted for ink and pencil sketches and pastel images. These materials were easily transported and quick to use. Working in the fast-paced environment of military stations, Poor had little time to depict these fleeting moments; therefore, her works contain fine and sketchy lines with simplified backgrounds. The example of Green Figure in Hull, completed in oil on masonite board, perhaps shows an infrequent moment of rest, thus allowing her to work with a slow-drying material. The compositions of men and planes also highlight her ability to merge human figures with the machines they control.

After the war years, Poor returned to creating landscapes, starting with a trip across Greece and Italy, in which her sketches later turned into a book titled Greece with text by Henry Miller. He describes her work as one that conveys "intimate, first-hand knowledge of her subject" and showcases her exact and simple use of lines.

Poor's landscapes shifted from her travels to familiar scenes from her home in Rockland County and New York in general. One seemingly favorite subject matter included the Hudson River. In further explanation of these works, Poor quotes, "I'm not really interested in realistic particulars of a scene... I'm trying to get a sense of big spaces and a larger whole." During the last years of her life, Poor's artwork turned more inward and intimate as it described her day-to-day routine; paintings filled with pet cats and floral bouquets. Although perhaps not deemed as exciting compared to her work in the 1940s, Poor delicately renders her environment with both a sense of interest, acceptance, and honor.

== Survey of criticism ==
In all of the publications that mention Anne Poor's name, only high compliments are paid regarding her work. For starters, Henry Miller raved about her sketches as his only incentive to write more regarding his travels to Greece. He is also quoted as if mystified by her talents.

I come back to the drawings again and again, to marvel over their simplicity and exactitude. What intrigues one is their suggestive quality. What has been left out— with purpose, to be sure— remains like some mysterious X quantity, or effluvium rather. Ambiance is all.

Critic Edward Alden Jewell of the New York Times also reviewed her one-person show, "Men in Flight," at the American-British Art Center, saying "she sees with her own eyes and thinks for herself... Anne Poor is still very young and already she has accomplished a great deal." Yet again, for the same show, the praise only continued.

Artist Poor's quick impressions convey an intimate first-hand knowledge of her subject...behind all this young artists work one senses alertness, keen observation and growth.

At the same center in 1946, Poor showed wartime wash and ink drawings such as Blood Transfusion, undated and Walking Wounded, undated. An unknown New York Times reviewer labeled the work as "powerful and moving studies."

After the war, Poor experienced an intensified interest in landscapes and still-life's and, regardless of the missing action compared to her wartime work, received great acclaim. Alan Gussow, an artist and author, expressed that one experiences "whole worlds of feeling revealed in simple flowers" in her work.

Arguably one of the most significant awards bestowed on Poor was the induction as a distinguished artist to the American Academy and Institute of Arts and Letters. In an article describing this event, Michael Hitzig quoted Gertrude Dahlberg, widow of Edwin Dahlberg—a great painter also hailing from Rockland—saying "Since the death of Edward Hopper in 1966, the only nationally renowned painter whose earliest roots are in Rockland is Anne Poor."

Hitzig did not hold back when offering his own compliments:

If she is not exactly an "immortal," like one of those French Immortals who comprise the Académie française, Anne Poor of New York City, had come within bailing distance of that exalted appellation...
