= Don Hanmer =

American actor (1919–2003)

- Born: Donald L. Hanmer; October 17, 1919; Chicago, Illinois, US
- Died: May 24, 2003 (aged 83); Monterey, California, US
- Occupation: Actor
- Years active: 1945–1991
- Spouse(s): Jocelyn Brando (div. 1950); Susan Tucker Huntington
- Children: 4

Donald L. Hanmer (October 17, 1919 – May 24, 2003) was an American film actor.

== Early years ==
Hanmer was born in Chicago, Illinois, on October 17, 1919. He attended the Goodman School of Acting in Chicago on a scholarship for three years and graduated from the Actors Studio.

Hanmer also served in the U. S. Army.

== Career ==
Hanmer began his career on Broadway, where he was considered once a big hit. His Broadway credits included Winged Victory (1943), Yellow Jack (1944), Galileo (1947), Sundown Beach (1948), My Name Is Aquilon (1949), The Man (1950), and The Ponder Heart (1956).

Hanmer won a Donaldson Award for his performance when the Actors Studio produced Sundown Beach (1948).

== Personal life and death ==
Hanmer was first married to actress Jocelyn Brando, and, later, to Susan Tucker Huntington. He died on May 24, 2003, aged 83, in Monterey, California, from cancer..

== Filmography ==
Year	Title	Role	Notes
1944	Winged Victory	Soldier	Uncredited
1952	Tales of Tomorrow		Season 2 Episode 17: "The Fatal Flower"
1956	Alfred Hitchcock Presents	Cutter	Season 2 Episode 11: "The Better Bargain"
1962	Alfred Hitchcock Presents	Vern Byers	Season 7 Episode 17: "The Faith of Aaron Menefee"
1962	The Alfred Hitchcock Hour	Wormer	Season 1 Episode 6: "Final Vow"
1963	The Alfred Hitchcock Hour	Leo Lloyd	Season 1 Episode 24: "The Star Juror"
1964	Vom Himmel gefallen	Sergeant Coppenbarger	
1968	The Counterfeit Killer	O'Hara	
1970	They Call Me Mister Tibbs!	Pusher	Uncredited
1971	Drive, He Said	Director of Athletics	
1972	Cannon	Burt Vincente	Season 2 Episode 4: "That Was No Lady"
1973	Cannon	Phil Willets - Cafe Owner	Season 3 Episode 9: "Dead Lady's Tears"
1973	Papillon	Butterfly Trader	
1974	Newman's Law	Real Estate Agent	
1976	St. Ives	Punch	
1984	Rhinestone	Sid	
1989	Homer and Eddie	Cashier #2	
1989	Caddie Woodlawn	Townsman #1	
