= DeWint House =

Historic house in New York, United States

- De Wint House
- U.S. National Register of Historic Places
- U.S. National Historic Landmark
- New York State Register of Historic Places
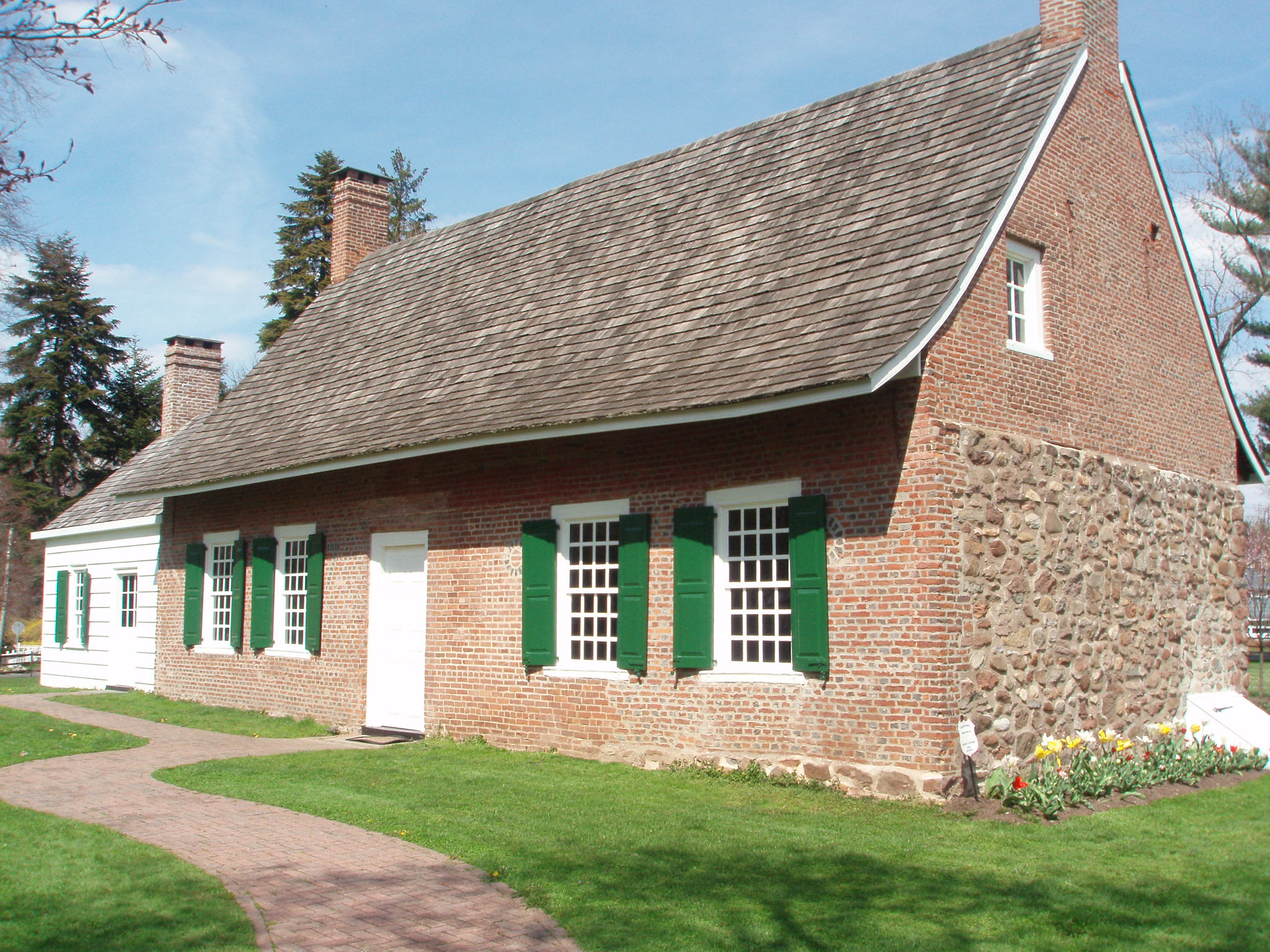
- The DeWint House in 2010
- Location: Oak Tree Road and Livingston Street, Tappan, New York
- Coordinates: 41°01′11″N 73°56′48″W
- Built: 1700
- Architect: Daniel DeClark
- Architectural style: Dutch
- NRHP reference No.: 66000568
- NYSRHP No.: 08703.000104

Significant dates
- Added to NRHP: October 15, 1966
- Designated NHL: May 23, 1966
- Designated NYSRHP: June 23, 1980

The DeWint House, in Tappan, New York, is one of the oldest surviving structures in Rockland County and is an outstanding example of Hudson Valley Dutch Colonial architecture.

== History ==
It was built using brick and indigenous stone in 1700 by Daniel DeClark, a Hollander, who emigrated to America in 1676 and bought the land from Native Americans in 1682. The date of construction is marked by glazed bricks incorporated into the façade.

In 1746, West Indian planter and American patriot Johannes DeWint and his spouse Antje Dewint bought the house. His daughter, Anna Maria, and her husband, Major Fredericus Blauvelt, lived in the house.

The DeWint House became a temporary headquarters of George Washington while he was Commander-in-Chief during the American Revolution. Washington was a guest in the south parlor twice in 1780 and twice in 1783.

=== Washington's headquarters ===
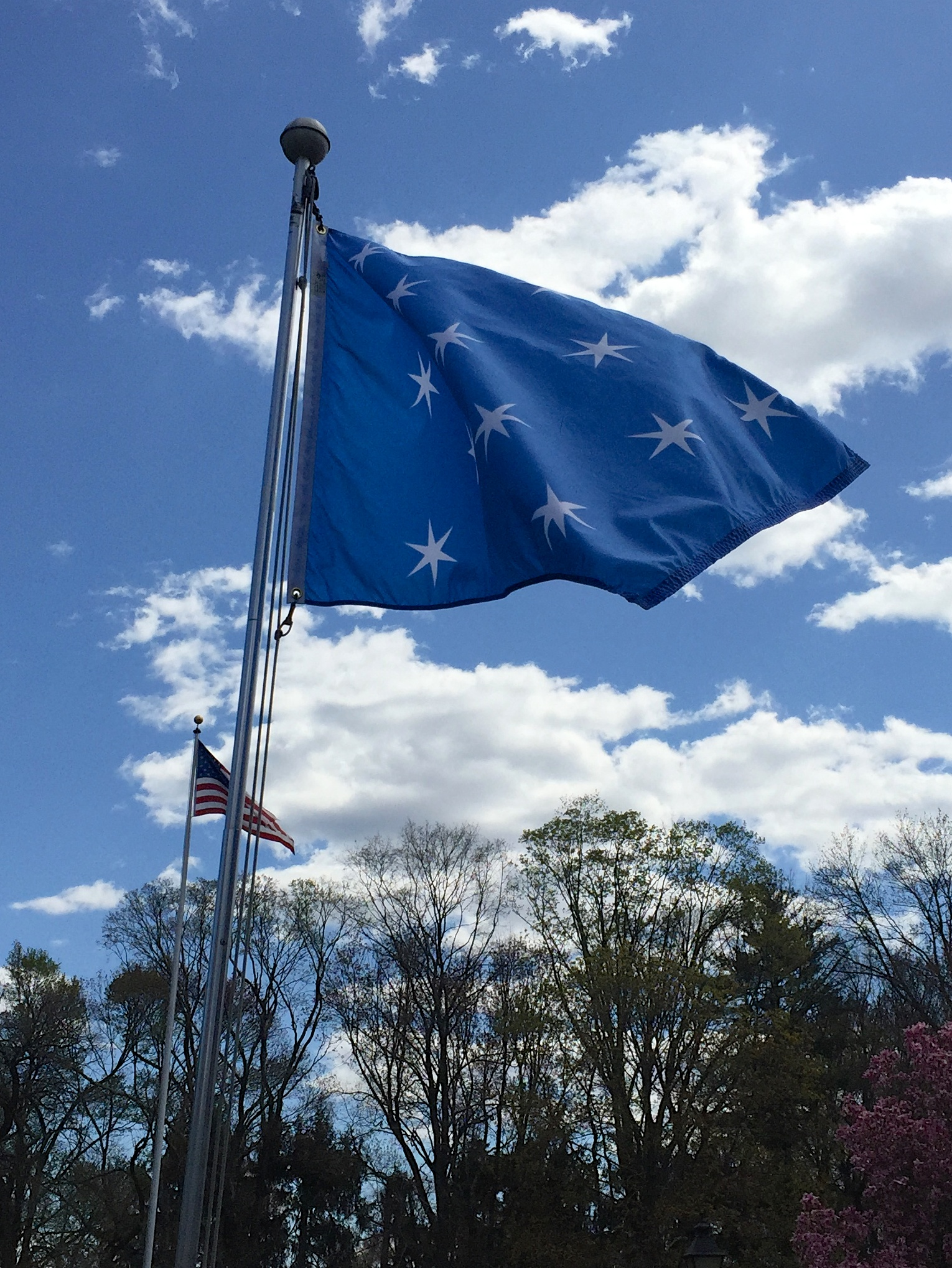
Personal flag used by General George Washington as Commander-in-Chief during the American Revolutionary War

Washington first stayed at the Dewint House from August 8–24, 1780, while inspecting a redoubt on the Hudson River.

Washington returned from September 28 to October 7, 1780, for the nearby trial of British spy Major John André. Washington signed the execution warrant in the house and Andre was subsequently hanged. Andre had been captured in Tarrytown after plotting with Benedict Arnold to surrender West Point to the British. André was held in the Old '76 House in Tappan, a tavern which is now a restaurant. Washington provided meals from his table at the DeWint House to André at the '76 House. A stone on André Hill Road at Gallows Hill marks the site of André's hanging.

Washington and his key staff headquartered at the DeWint House from May 4–8, 1783, while negotiating the final withdrawal of British troops from New York City with British General Sir Guy Carleton. It was said to have been a friendly conference combined with an elegant dinner prepared by Samuel Fraunces, owner of Fraunces Tavern in New York City, who came up to prepare the dinner for Washington and his guest.

From November 11–14, 1783, a terrible snowstorm forced Washington to seek shelter in the DeWint House on his trip to visit West Point and later New York City.

== Grounds and renovation ==
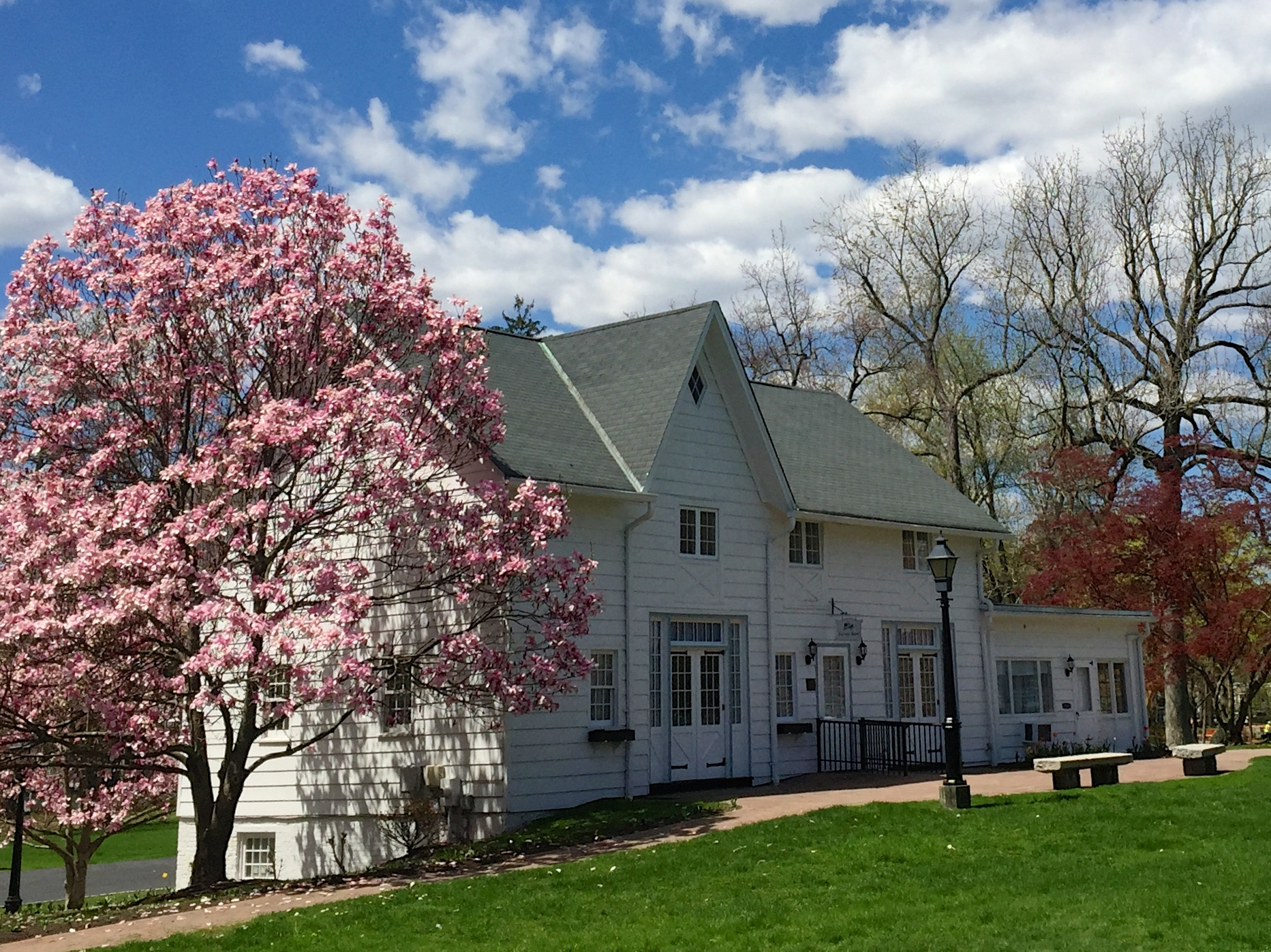
Carriage house

The property was in disrepair when it was acquired by the Grand Lodge of Free and Accepted Masons of the State of New York in 1932. The site was declared a National Historic Landmark and was added to the National Register of Historic Places in 1966.

The site has undergone extensive restoration and upgrading. The house's two first-floor rooms have been restored and furnished to reflect the period of Washington's occupancy. A replica kitchen, as Washington might have known it while he was a guest of the DeWints, was completed in 1996.

The grounds include a 19th-century carriage house that contains displays of artifacts uncovered at the site during archaeological digs, as wells as items related to Washington, André and Arnold, and the Masons. A large mill stone from a grist mill in nearby Ramapo is displayed on the grounds, and at the rear of the house stand seven small grave markers each bearing one to three initials, which came from a nearby property. It is believed these markers came from a burial ground for slaves on that property.

The house and grounds are open to the public daily.

The DeWint House, along with Stony Point Battlefield in Stony Point and the Blauvelt House in New City, are the only places in Rockland County designated as New York State Paths through History sites.
