= New City Condominiums =

Neighborhood in New York City

Coordinates: 41°09′34″N 73°59′08″W

- Neighborhood in New City, New York
- Nicknames: "The Condos", "Heritage Drive"
- Interactive map of New City Condominiums
- Established: 1970s

Area
  - Total: 0.10 km^{2} (0.04 sq mi)

Population
  - Total: approx. 1,000
- ZIP codes: 10956
- Area code: 845

The New City Condominiums (also called The Condos, Heritage Dr., The New City Condos, or simply Heritage) is a working to middle class residential neighborhood near the center of New City, New York, the county seat of Rockland County. The neighborhood takes up the entire street of Heritage Drive, and consists almost entirely of townhouses that were built in the 1970s. It is one of the most urbanized neighborhoods in New City, and is located about 0.8 miles (1.3 km) north of the downtown area.

== Community ==
A working to middle-class neighborhood, the New City Condominiums consists almost entirely of townhouses, usually in sets of 6–12. This gives it a high population density compared to most New City neighborhoods. It is known as being the most diverse neighborhood in New City, with many Russian Americans, African Americans, Hispanic Americans, Irish Americans, Italian Americans, Haitian Americans, Asian Americans, and Jewish Americans that live in the area, as well as people of other ethnic backgrounds. Being located right behind the New City Library, a few blocks down from many shopping centers on North Main St, and less than a mile north of the downtown area, make it a walkable neighborhood.

== Education ==
The neighborhood is served by Clarkstown Central School District. Most students that reside in The Condos attend New City and Woodglen Elementary, Felix Festa Middle School, and Clarkstown High Schools North and South.

== Notable people from The Condos ==
- Keith Bulluck: NFL football player; grew up in The Condos.
- Adam Rodriguez: Actor, one of the stars of CSI: Miami; grew up in The Condos.

== See also ==
- Clarkstown, New York
