= Marion Dorn =

American textile designer

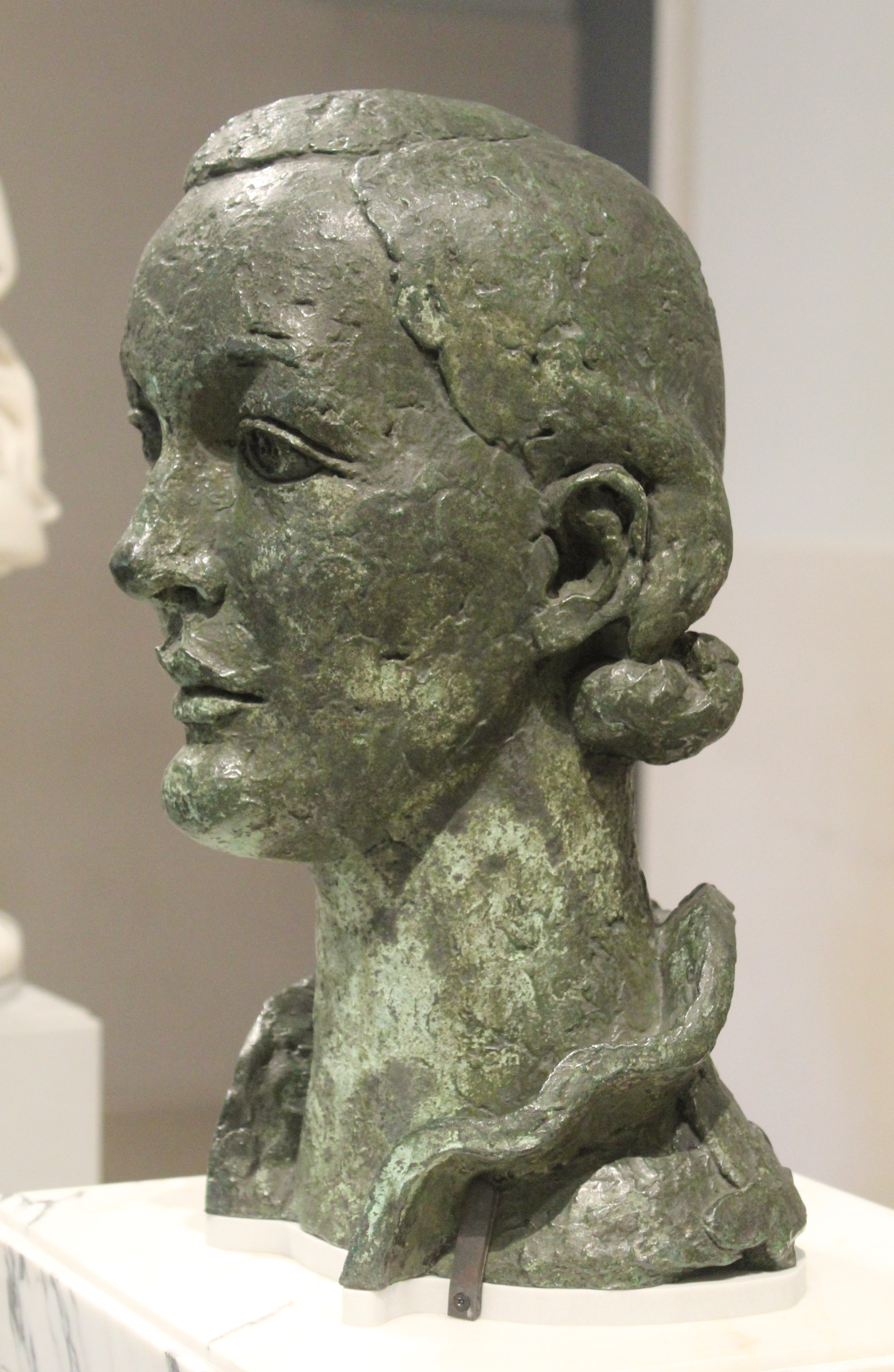
- Dorn, about 1930-31, by Frank Dobson
- Born: Marion Victoria Dorn; December 25, 1896; Menlo Park, California, US
- Died: January 28, 1964 (aged 67); Tangier, Morocco
- Other names: Marion Dorn Kauffer, Marion Dorn Poor
- Education: Stanford University
- Known for: Textile arts
- Movement: European Avant-Garde
- Spouse(s): Henry Varnum Poor (m. 1919; div. 1923) Edward McKnight Kauffer (m. 1950; died 1954)

Marion Victoria Dorn also known as Marion Dorn Kauffer (born in Menlo Park, California on December 25, 1896—died in Tangier, Morocco on January 28, 1964) was an American textile designer primarily in the form of wall hangings, carpeting and rugs, however she is also known to have produced wallpaper, graphics, and illustrations. Known for her significant contributions to modern British interiors in particular for her 'sculpted' carpets, she contributed to some of the best-known interiors of the time including the Savoy Hotel, Claridges, the Orion and the Queen Mary. In the late 1930s and early 1940s she created moquette fabric designs for use in London Transport passenger vehicles.

== Early life ==
Marion Victoria Dorn's parents were Diodemus Socrates Dorn (1860–1913), a lawyer, and Camille Johnson (1870–1932); she was one of five children. From 1912 to 1916 she was educated at Stanford University, graduating with a bachelor of arts in graphic arts.

She moved to San Francisco and shared a studio in Russian Hill, with her former tutor, the artist Henry Varnum Poor. They were married from July 1919 to October 1923. In 1919 Poor and Dorn moved to New City, and Dorn gained notice as a designer of batiks.

In Paris in 1923 she met the poster designer Edward McKnight Kauffer (1890–1954), and subsequently resided with him in London from late 1923 to July 1940. They married in 1950 and lived in New York until his death in 1954.

== Career ==
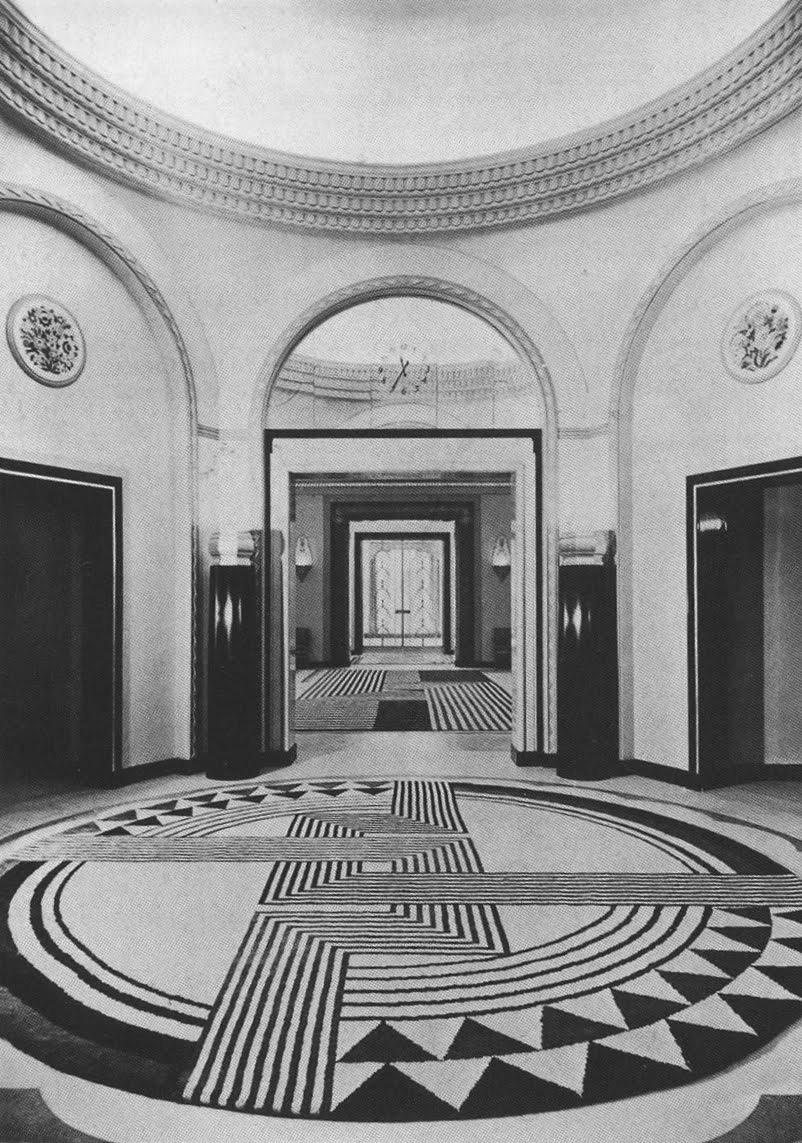
Art Deco geometric carpets designed by Marion Dorn for the lobby at Claridge's Hotel in London, 1931

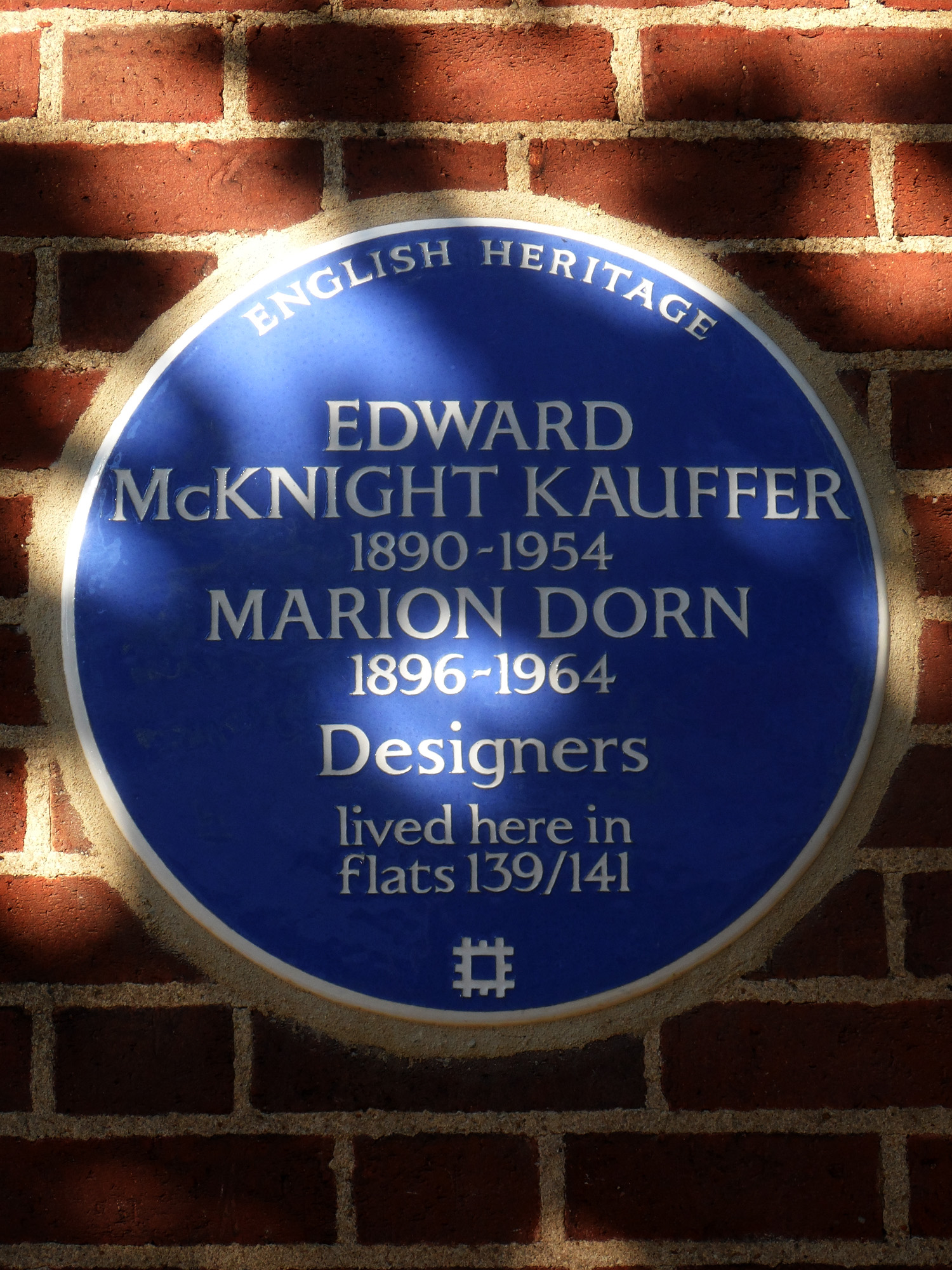
Blue plaque erected in 2015 by English Heritage at Swan Court, Chelsea Manor Street, Chelsea, London SW3 5RY, Royal Borough of Kensington and Chelsea.

Dorn's career took off in the early 1920s with her move to London, she was creating batik textiles as well as printing on silk, linen, velvet at the time. Five of her batiks were featured in Vogue magazine in May 1925 which helped her gain popularity and showed her inventiveness.

By 1925 her textiles were featured in many specialty stores in London and since her designs were considered "modern textiles" her work was also featured in galleries and museums in London.

In 1934 she founded her own company, Marion Dorn LTD. and received commissions from major clients, such as the luxury hotels the Berkeley of London and the London Savoy.

The London Passenger Transport Board commissioned Dorn in 1936 to design moquette fabrics for use in vehicles. This led to four designs: 'Chesham' in 1936, 'Colindale' and 'Canonbury' in 1937, and 'Caledonian' in 1942. The designs were still in use in the London Underground into the 1960s.

She received an honorary fellowship of the British Society of Industrial Artists in 1957 for her contribution to textile design.

She retired to Tangier, Morocco, in 1962, where she died on January 28, 1964.

=== Exhibitions ===
From 1927 to 1939 Dorn's work was exhibited in many influential European exhibitions as well as exports and exhibitions in the United States including the following:

- Arthur Tooth Gallery, London (1929), Exhibition of Rugs by Marion Dorn and Edward McKnight Kauffer
- Dorland Hall, London (1933 and 1934),
- Burlington House, London (1935), Exhibition of British Art in Industry
- The Universal Exhibition (World's Fair), Paris (1937)
- Metropolitan Museum of Art, New York (1937), Rugs and Carpets: An International Exhibition
- Golden Gate International Exposition (GGIE), San Francisco (1939), maintained exposure in the United States for her work in her absence

After returning to New York she worked with multiple firms, including wallpaper manufacturer Basset and Vollum and textile manufacturers A. H. Lee, Goodall Fabrics, Jofa Inc., Mitchell-David, F. Schumacher & Co., and Silkar Studios; longer and more fruitful associations were with Greeff Fabrics Inc. (1956–64), who exported her fabrics to Britain through Warners; the wallpaper manufacturer Katenbach and Warren (c.1947–59); and the hand gun-tufted rug and carpet manufacturer Edward Fields Inc., producing over a hundred designs (1949–1962).

== Legacy ==
Dorn completed her last major commission (1960), the carpet for the diplomatic reception room at the White House, Washington, DC. She made a significant contribution to British modern interiors independently and in collaboration with architects such as Oliver Hill, Robert Lutyens, Serge Chermayeff, Eric Mendelsohn, Wells Coates, and Brian O'Rorke, and interior decorators such as Syrie Maugham. A cast bronze bust of Marion Dorn, circa 1930-1931 made by Frank Owen Dobson is at the National Portrait Gallery in London. In 1930s commissioned to design 5.8m circular carpet for Ginie & Stephen Courtauld’s Eltham Palace entrance hall. ‘Its shades of reddish brown, pinkish beige and fawn complemented the marquetry designs on the walls, and the pattern was intended to draw visitors into the drawing and dining rooms.’ taken from English Heritage Guidebook of Eltham Palace.
