= Peter DePew House =

Historic house in New York, United States

- U.S. National Register of Historic Places
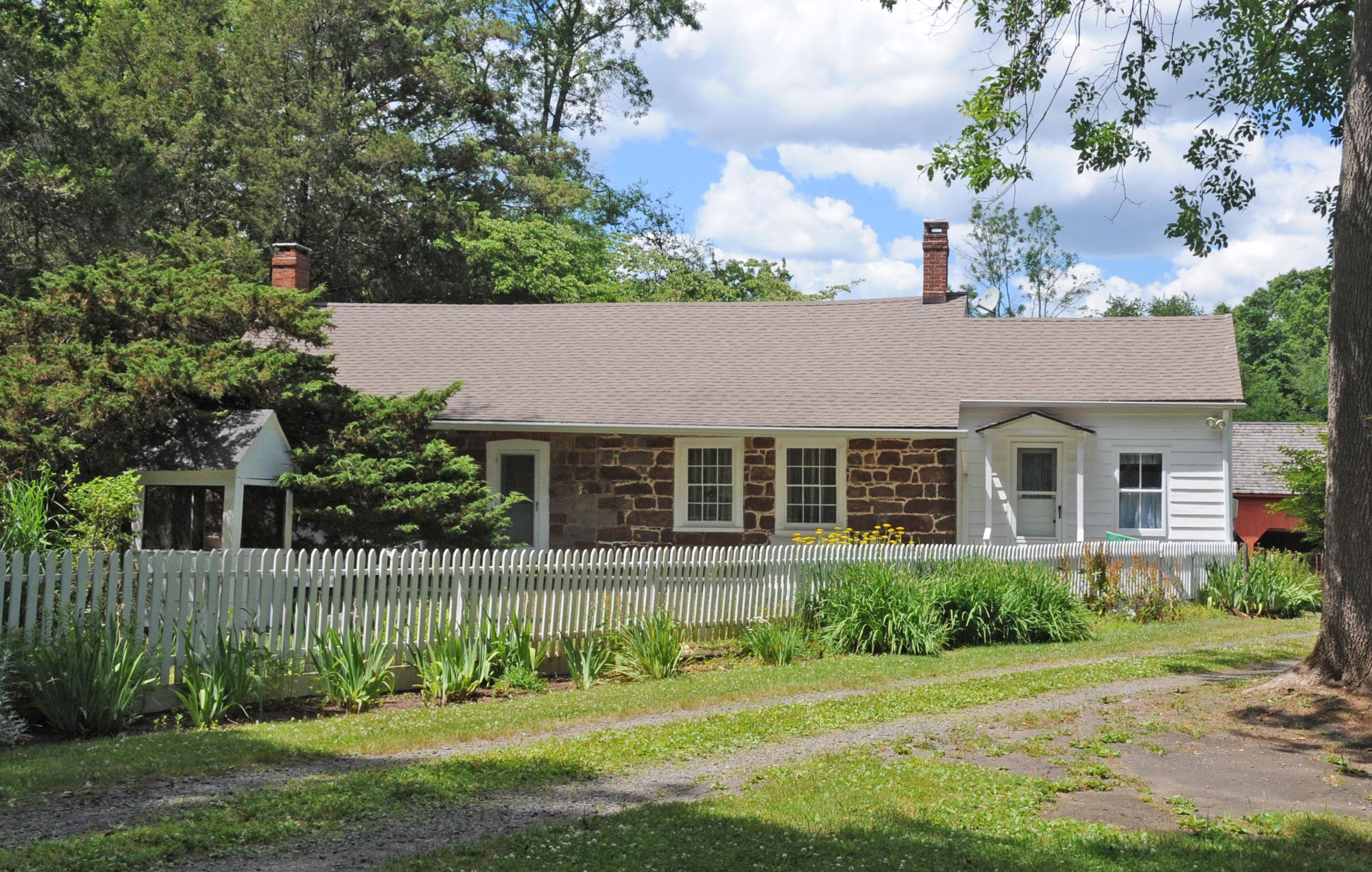

- Location within New York Location within the United States
- Nearest city: 101 Old Route 304, New City, New York
- Coordinates: 41°10′13″N 73°58′39″W
- Area: 32.2 acres (13.0 ha)
- Built: 1750
- Architectural style: Colonial, Dutch Colonial
- NRHP reference No.: 08000596
- Added to NRHP: July 3, 2008

Peter DePew House is a historic home in New City in Rockland County, New York. It is a 1 1/2-story dwelling built of locally quarried sandstone. The oldest section dates to about 1750. The property also has a large timber-framed barn.

It was listed on the National Register of Historic Places in 2008.
