= Blauvelt House (New City, New York) =

Historic house in New York, United States

- U.S. National Register of Historic Places
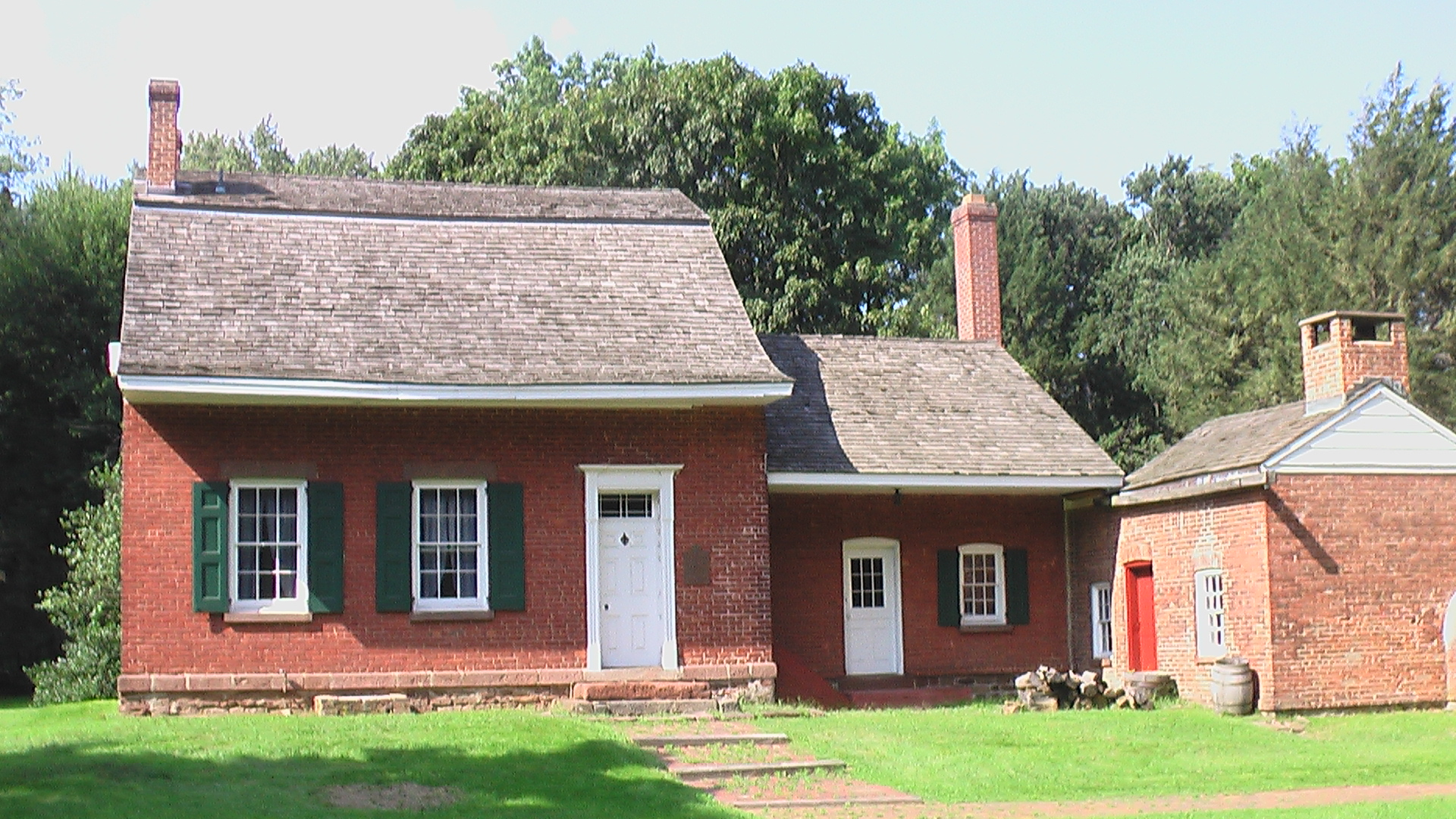

- Location within New York Location within the United States
- Location: 20 Zukor Road, New City, New York
- Coordinates: 41°10′16″N 73°59′17″W
- Area: 1.5 acres (0.61 ha)
- Built: 1834
- NRHP reference No.: 85000659
- Added to NRHP: March 28, 1985

The Blauvelt House (also known as Jacob Blauvelt Farmhouse) is a historic house and farm complex located at 20 Zukor Road in New City, Rockland County, New York.

== Description and history ==
Built in 1832, it includes the farmhouse with attached smokehouse, a large barn, a utility shop, a privy, and a woodshed. Blauvelet's descendants lived in the house until 1970, when it was acquired by the Historical Society of Rockland. The property is owned by the Historical Society of Rockland County and operated as a seasonal museum and cultural center.

It was listed on the National Register of Historic Places on March 28, 1985.

The Blauvelt House along with DeWint House in Tappan and Stony Point Battlefield in Stony Point are the only places in Rockland County designated as New York State "Paths through History" sites.
