= Pop Hollinger =

American comic collector (1886–1977)

- Born: Harvey T. Hollinger; October 13, 1886; Chapman, Kansas
- Died: March 6, 1977 (aged 90); Concordia, Kansas
- Education: McPherson College
- Occupations: Collector, retailer, inventor

Example of an ad Pop Hollinger placed in some of his rebuilt comic books.

Harvey T. "Pop" Hollinger (October 13, 1886 – March 6, 1977) was one of the first comic book collectors. He set up his retail and mail order shop for new and used comics in Concordia, Kansas, in the late 1930s.

== Biography ==
=== Early life ===
Hollinger was born in rural Chapman, Kansas, and lived there through his high school years. After high school, he purchased a Harley-Davidson motorcycle and camera, then proceeded to travel the Midwest earning money for gas and food by selling photos he took along the way.

In 1905, Hollinger married and in the same year enrolled at McPherson College in McPherson, Kansas. He played football and baseball for the McPherson Bulldogs until he graduated in 1912 with a liberal arts degree.

In 1914, Hollinger and his family moved to Concordia, Kansas, to accept the position of teacher of applied sciences at Concordia Junior-Senior High School where he created the Industrial Arts program. In 1933 he retired from his teaching job to become self-employed running a service station and operated a secondhand store as a sideline in the basement of a local grocer. In 1939, Pop transitioned to selling mainly periodicals and comic books. Pop Hollinger ran his used comic book store from 1939 until 1971. Pop bought and sold old comic books throughout the Golden Age and Silver Age. During World War II, Pop was asked to return to high school teaching as many of the instructors had joined the fight.

=== Comic books ===
Hollinger entered into the comics trade through his retail store and expanded into mail order. Originally a side business, he became so successful that he began working on ways to trade comics and began experimenting with restorative methods. His restoring attempts included using tape and staples and were primarily done to enhance the longevity of the reading experience rather than to boost the collector value. Hollinger referred to this process as 'rebuilding' and to the comic books as 'rebuilt comics'.

=== Inventions ===
Hollinger held several patents, including a Tray Dispenser (patent 4323168), a method and apparatus for dispensing flexible trays.
