= In Name Only =

1939 film by John Cromwell

- Movie poster
- Directed by: John Cromwell
- Screenplay by: Richard Sherman
- Based on: Memory of Love; 1935 novel by Bessie Breuer
- Produced by: George Haight
- Starring: Cary Grant; Carole Lombard; Kay Francis
- Cinematography: J. Roy Hunt
- Edited by: William Hamilton
- Music by: Roy Webb
- Distributed by: RKO Radio Pictures
- Release date: August 18, 1939
- Running time: 94 minutes
- Language: English
- Budget: $722,000
- Box office: $1,321,000

In Name Only is a 1939 romantic film starring Cary Grant, Carole Lombard, and Kay Francis, directed by John Cromwell. It was based on the 1935 novel Memory of Love by Bessie Breuer. The fictional town where it is set, Bridgefield, Connecticut, is based on the town of Ridgefield, Connecticut.

== Plot ==
Alec Walker puts up with a loveless marriage to Maida, until he meets widow Julie Eden. They fall in love and he asks his wife for a divorce. She refuses; as she goes on to tell him, she married him solely for his social position and wealth and will not give them up. She is such a skillful liar that she has Alec's parents convinced that Julie is out to destroy the marriage.

Julie breaks up with Alec because she cannot see any future with him. On Christmas Eve, a distraught Alec gets drunk, falls asleep in front of an open window, and becomes deathly ill. At the hospital, Dr. Muller tells Julie and Alec's father that the patient is likely to recover if he has the will to live. Julie lies to Alec, telling him that Maida will let him go.

When Maida shows up and tries to see Alec, Julie blocks her. With no one else in the room, Maida freely admits she gave up the man she really loved for Alec's position and his father's wealth. However, Alec's parents enter behind her and overhear her cold-blooded admission. With Maida's plotting exposed, the path to Alec and Julie's happiness is now clear.

== Cast ==
- Carole Lombard as Julie Eden
- Cary Grant as Alec Walker
- Kay Francis as Maida Walker
- Charles Coburn as Richard Walker
- Helen Vinson as Suzanne Duross, Maida's "best" friend, who makes a play for Alec
- Katherine Alexander as Laura Morton, Julie's sister, embittered against men by her own unhappy experience
- Jonathan Hale as Dr. Ned Gateson, a friend of the Walker family
- Nella Walker as Grace Walker
- Alan Baxter as Charley
- Maurice Moscovich as Dr. Muller
- Peggy Ann Garner as Ellen Eden, Julie's daughter
- Charles Coleman as Archie Duross
- Grady Sutton as Paul Graham (uncredited)

== Notes ==
According to Robert Osborne, the film was intended to reteam Katharine Hepburn and Cary Grant. However, the disastrous reception of Bringing Up Baby led to Hepburn being considered "box-office poison" and Lombard being cast, instead.

== Reception ==
The film was praised by critics: Variety wrote, "In the steering of the story director John Cromwell has made every situation as believable as could be accomplished in order to sustain the dramatic undercurrent, strife and the beleaguered romance which has developed. Cary Grant and Carole Lombard emerge highly impressive." "Soap opera par excellence," wrote Frank Nugent in The New York Times, "blessed with a peerless cast."

Despite both Grant and Lombard playing against type, the film was popular and earned a profit of $155,000.
