= South Mountain Road =

Two-lane road in New York

Coordinates: 41°11′6.7″N 74°0′1.0″W

South Mountain Road is a winding, two-lane historic road on the northern border of New City, New York, a hamlet in Rockland County. Historic High Tor State Park is an attraction on South Mountain Road. Also on the road is the Henry Varnum Poor House, listed on the National Register of Historic Places in 2007. South Mountain Road's western terminus is New York State Route 45 in Pomona. The eastern terminus is in New City at Haverstraw Road.

Although the post office and some individuals abbreviate it as S. Mountain Rd., the south in the name is not a directional. There is no North Mountain Road. It gets its name from being the road south of the mountain.

In the early 20th century, the road attracted a host of artistic people who made up an informal artists' colony. Members of the group included Maxwell Anderson, the playwright (in later years, actor Barry Bostwick lived in Anderson's house, selling it in 2005); composer Kurt Weill and his wife, singer/actress Lotte Lenya; actor/director/producer John Houseman, and architect/potter/painter Henry Varnum Poor. Other notable residents included Norman Lloyd, Dr. Martha MacGuffie, Michael DiLorenzo Jr, Eva Zeisel, and a teen aged René Auberjonois, who occasionally baby-sat for some of the residents.

Maxwell Anderson's daughter, Hesper Anderson, wrote a book titled South Mountain Road: A Daughter's Journey of Discovery (Simon & Schuster, 2000) about her family life and this circle of artists. The road and some of its features gets a mention in writer James Salter's 1997 memoir Burning the Days. He and his family lived nearby and were part of the social scene.

The road also served as the inspiration for musical artist James G. Barry's song "South Mountain Road" on his debut album Wake Up Singing. As a teenager living in New City, driving along South Mountain Road was for him an escape, an adventure, and an exploration (of mind and spirit).

In 2002 the Town of Clarkstown approved the Historical Designation, in part, due to the cultural significance and scenic viewshed. Other key features are noted as heavily wooded with vistas that can be appreciated due to the sloping terrain. Recent tree clearing along the road corridor along with increased construction and variance approvals by the local boards threaten to change the road permanently. Orange and Rockland has installed a controversial temporary substation and has installed overhead transmission lines, in part, to supply Tilcon and their mining operations. In doing so a significant number of trees and branches had to be removed which opened up the tree canopy over the roadway thereby detracting from the road. Additionally, Orange and Rockland Utilities is actively suing the Town of Clarkston via an article 78 proceeding. The court case asks for the court to reverse the denial by the town and allow for construction of an electrical substation. A local non-profit named New City Neighborhood Association Inc. and local neighbors rallied together, raising approximately $13,000, and have been successful in preventing the Little Tor Substation from being built thus far. The basis for the town's denial was the New City Neighborhood Association's claim that the historical designation does not allow for an industrial structure to be built and that it would directly affect the aesthetic value of the road while providing a constant buzz that carries through the wilderness.
