= Henry Varnum Poor (designer) =

American artist (1887–1970)

- Born: September 30, 1887; Chapman, Kansas, U.S.
- Died: December 8, 1970 (aged 83); New City, New York, U.S.
- Education: Slade School, Académie Julian
- Alma mater: Stanford University
- Occupations: Architect, painter, sculptor, muralist, potter, professor
- Spouse(s): Marion Dorn (m. 1919; div. 1923) Bessie Breuer (m. 1925)
- Children: 3

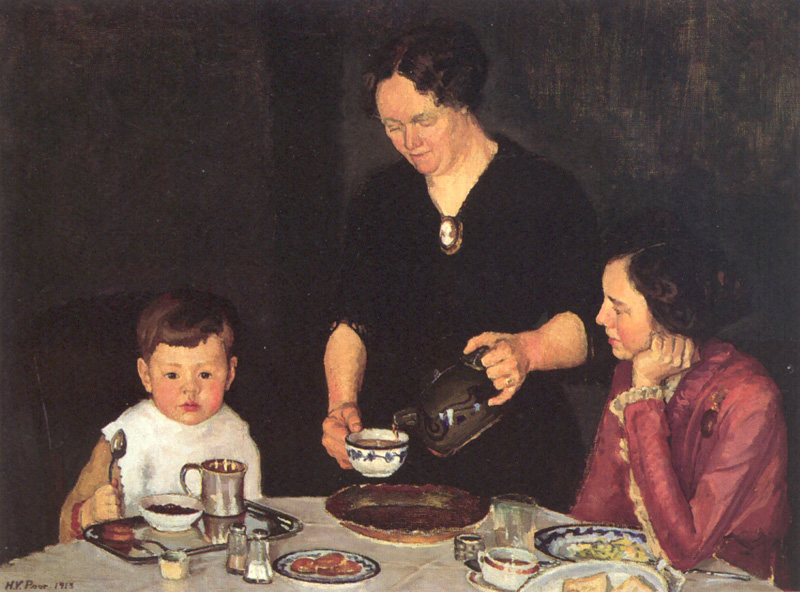
The Luncheon (1913) by Henry Varnum Poor

Henry Varnum Poor (September 30, 1887 – December 8, 1970) was an American architect, painter, sculptor, muralist, and potter. He was a grandnephew of Henry Varnum Poor, a founder of the predecessor firm to Standard & Poor's.

== Biography ==
He was born in Chapman, Kansas on September 30, 1887, to parents Alfred James Poor and Josephine Melinda Graham.

Poor attended Stanford University, where he graduated with a A.B. degree in 1910. He studied painting at the Slade School in London and under painter Walter Sickert, then attended the Académie Julian in Paris. He returned to the United States in 1911 and taught art at Stanford University before moving to San Francisco to teach at the San Francisco Art Association. From July 1919 to October 1923 Poor was married to a former student from Stanford (and a later known textile designer), Marion Dorn. Following military service in World War I, he settled in Rockland County, New York, and focused on ceramics. In 1925 he married journalist and writer Bessie Breuer.

In the late 1920s, Poor gained recognition as a painter and eventually turned to murals; he was commissioned to paint twelve murals in the U.S. Department of Justice and the mural Conservation of American Wild Life in the Department of the Interior during the 1930s. During World War II he was head of the War Art Unit of the Corps of Engineers. He served on the U.S. Commission of Fine Arts from 1944 to 1945. In 1946 Poor was one of the founders of the Skowhegan School of Painting and Sculpture and taught at Columbia University. Poor was a member of the American Academy of Arts and Letters and was a resident fellow in visual arts at the American Academy in Rome from 1950 to 1951.

Self-taught as an architect, Poor designed the "Crow House" on South Mountain Road in New City, New York for himself, and designed houses or home renovations for Kurt Weill and Lotte Lenya, John Houseman, Burgess Meredith and Maxwell Anderson.

He was also a potter, with ceramics in the permanent collections of the Art Institute of Chicago and the Metropolitan Museum of Art, and ceramics designed for Radio City Music Hall. He also has works in the collections of the Whitney Museum and the Phillips Collection. Poor's papers are in the Archives of American Art at the Smithsonian.

He died on December 8, 1970, in New City, New York.

Poor's pupils included the painter and printmaker Bertha Landers.

== Murals ==
As a muralist, Poor executed several large commissions:

- Ceramic mosaic for the ceiling of the Union Dime Savings Bank, Sixth Avenue and 40th Street, NYC, 1927
- 12 mural panels for the Robert F. Kennedy Department of Justice Building, Washington, D.C., circa 1935
- Conservation of Wildlife in America mural, Department of Interior Building, Washington, D.C. 1937-38
- Grape Harvest, a ceramic tile mural for the U.S. Post Office, Fresno, California, 1941–1942
- Two murals depicting Carl Sandburg and Louis Sullivan at the Uptown Chicago Post Office, 1943
- Extensive Land Grant Frescoes for the Old Main Building at Pennsylvania State University, over 1,300 square feet (120 m^{2}) of work, between 1940 and 1948
- Murals for the Louisville Courier-Journal Building, Louisville, Kentucky, 1948
