= Bessie Breuer =

American journalist

Bessie Breuer (born Elizabeth Freedman; October 19, 1893 – September 26, 1975) was an American journalist, novelist, and playwright. She was an O. Henry Award winner.

== Biography ==
Breuer was born with the name Elizabeth Freedman in Cleveland, Ohio to Samuel Aaron Freedman, a cantor and composer, and Julia Freedman. She studied journalism at University of Missouri and then worked as a reporter for the St. Louis Times in her late teens. She later became an editor for the New York Tribune, first working as the head of the women's department and then, at the age of 22, becoming the Sunday editor. She left that position to become the national director of magazine publicity for the American Red Cross at the end of World War I, and subsequently joined the staff of the Ladies Home Journal. She also contributed articles on feminism to Harper's Magazine and the Pictorial Review.

Part of the expatriate movement, Breuer moved to France in the early 1920s and began writing fiction under the encouragement of Kay Boyle and Laurence Vail. Her first works of fiction to be published were short stories in Story and Harper's magazines. She began using the name Bessie Breuer when she began to write fiction to differentiate it from her work as a journalist.

In 1925, she married her third husband, the painter Henry Varnum Poor (previously she had been married to Otho B. Breuer and Carl Kahler). This third marriage of 45 years ended with Poor's death in 1970.

Breuer's first novel Memory of Love (1935) was made into a film in 1939 titled In Name Only. The film starred Cary Grant and Carole Lombard. Her other novels include The Daughter (1938), The Actress (1955), and Take Care of My Roses (1961). A prolific writer of short stories, she won four O. Henry Awards between 1943 and 1947. One of her stories is included in 55 Short Stories from the New Yorker and a collection of her stories was published, titled The Bracelet of Wavia Lea and Other Stories (1947). Sundown Beach, her only play, which was about World War II fliers suffering from posttraumatic stress disorder, premiered on Broadway in 1948. It was directed by Elia Kazan. It featured the young, then-unknown actress Julie Harris and was the first Broadway production of the Actors Studio.

During World War II, Breuer worked for the United States Office of War Information. She also wrote for periodicals such as World's Work, House Beautiful, Mademoiselle, and The New Yorker until the 1960s. She died at the age of 81 at her home in New York City. She had two children, Peter and Anne, and three grandchildren.

== Works ==
=== Novels ===
- Memory of Love (1935)
- The Daughter (1938)
- The Actress (1955)
- Take Care of My Roses (1961)

=== Stories ===
- The Bracelet of Wavia Lea (1947)

=== Plays ===
- Sundown Beach (1948)
