= Sundown Beach =

Sundown Beach is a 1948 play in two acts by American playwright Bessie Breuer. Directed by Elia Kazan, the play opened on Broadway at the Belasco Theatre on September 7, 1948, closing after seven performances on September 11, 1948. The cast notably included Julie Harris, who won a Theatre World Award for her portrayal of Ida Mae, as well as Cloris Leachman and child actor Joey Fallon making their respective Broadway debuts.
