= Henry Varnum Poor House =

Historic house in New York, United States

- U.S. National Register of Historic Places
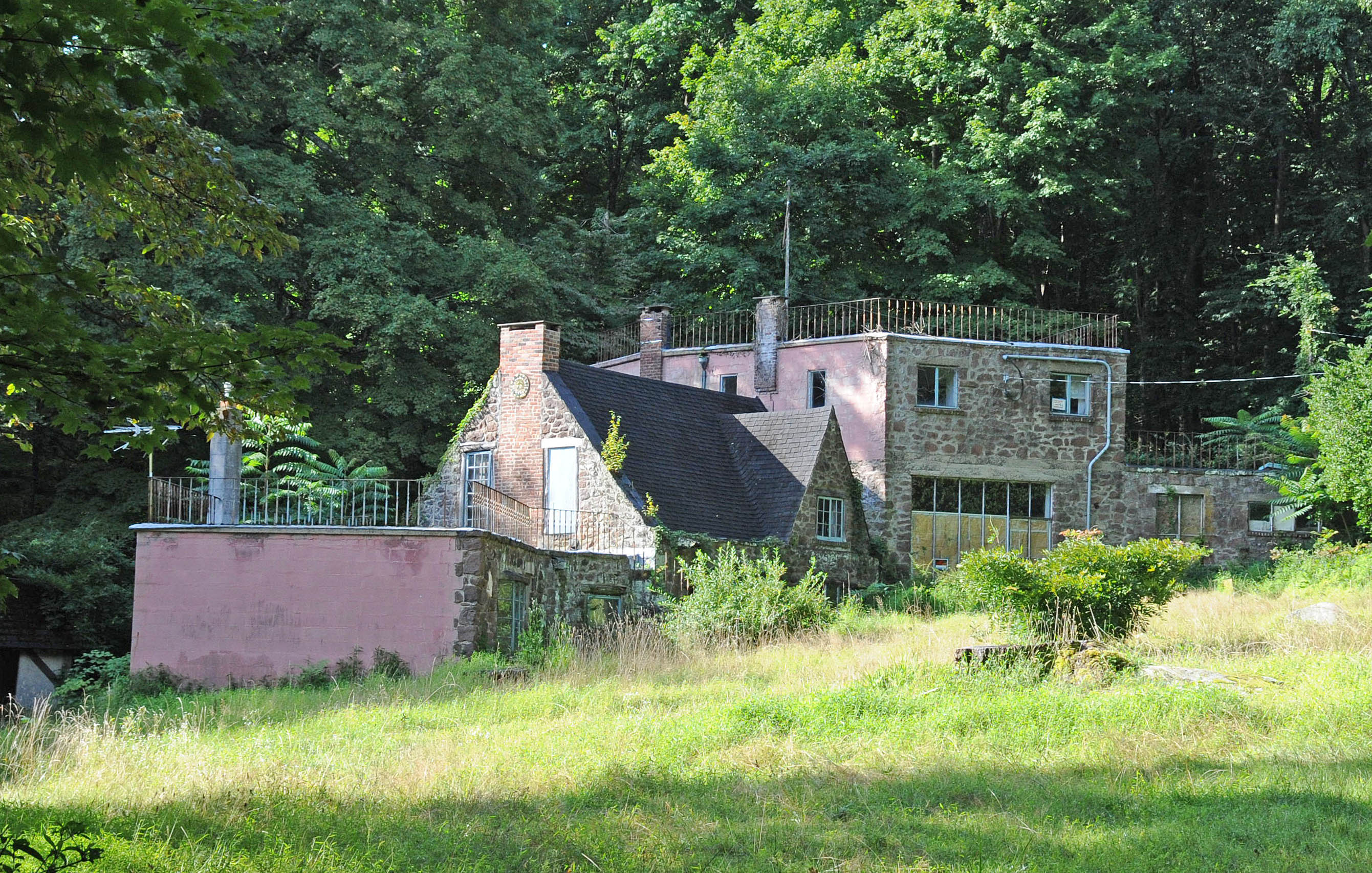

- Location within New York Location within the United States
- Nearest city: S. Mountain Rd., New City, New York
- Coordinates: 41°11′1″N 74°0′59″W
- Area: 5.3 acres (2.1 ha)
- Architect: Henry Varnum Poor
- Architectural style: Bungalow/craftsman, modern movement
- NRHP reference No.: 07001258
- Added to NRHP: December 11, 2007

The Henry Varnum Poor House, also known as the "Crow House", is a historic home located on South Mountain Road at New City in Rockland County, New York. It was built between about 1920 and 1949 by artist Henry Varnum Poor (1887–1970). It combines elements of rustic Arts and Crafts movement vernacular with elements of the modern movement. Also on the property are a studio dated to 1957; a small half-timbered mill building, 1921; woodshop, circa 1920–1930; an outdoor kiln from 1957; bridge, circa 1950; and a terraced garden, 1926.

It was listed on the National Register of Historic Places in 2007. About the same time the town of Ramapo purchased the house for $1.3 million with help of a $496,000 grant from the New York State Office of Parks, Recreation and Historic Preservation. There were also plans for contribution of furnishings and art from family heir Peter Varnum Poor, but collections and restoration efforts made little progress through 2015.

== See also ==
- National Register of Historic Places listings in Rockland County, New York
