= New City, New York =

- Census-designated place
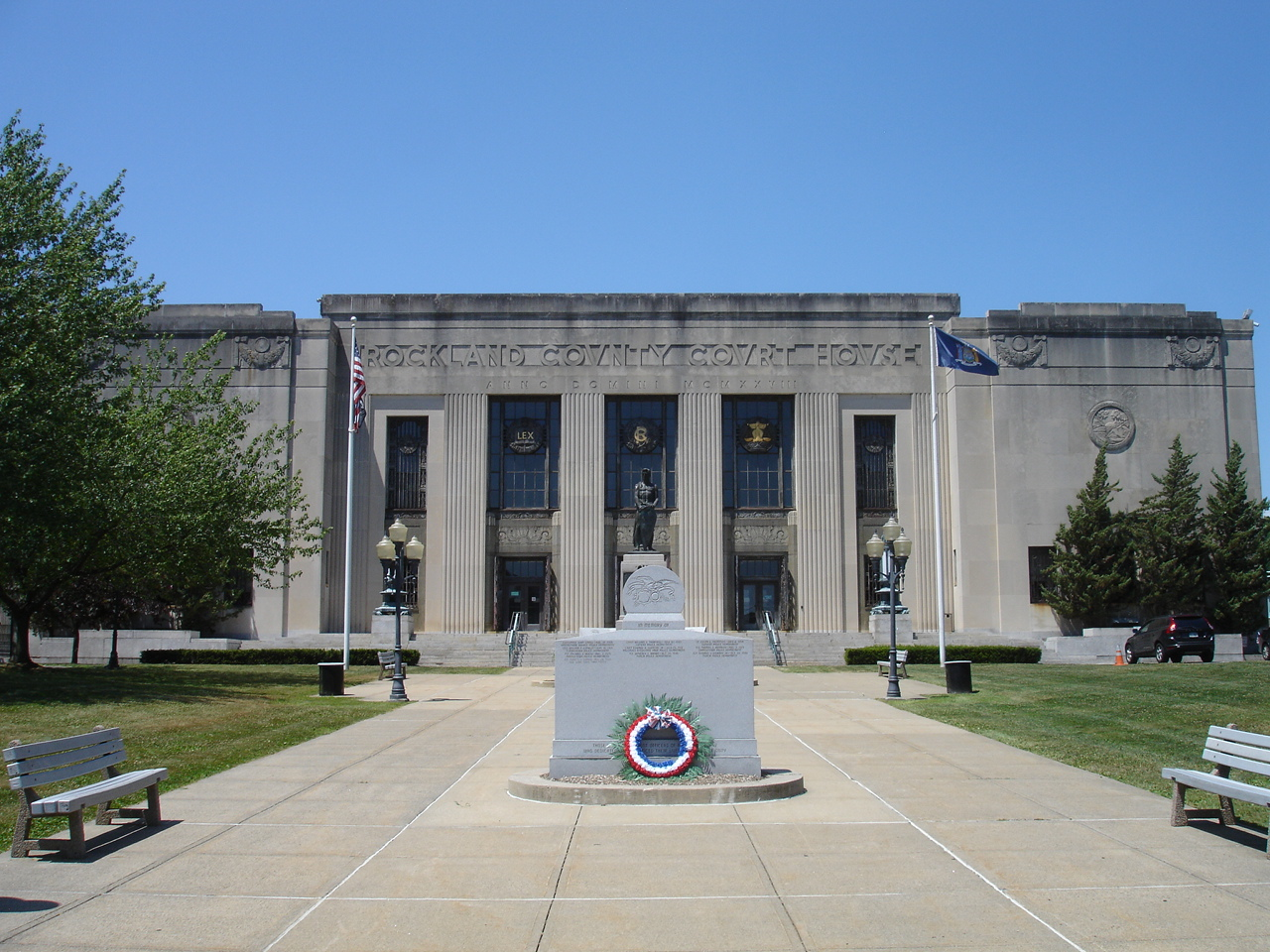
- Rockland County Court House in New City

- Location in Rockland County and the state of New York.
- Coordinates: 41°8′44″N 73°59′42″W
- Country: United States
- State: New York
- County: Rockland
- Town: Clarkstown

Area
  - Total: 16.25 sq mi (42.10 km^{2})
  - Land: 15.46 sq mi (40.05 km^{2})
  - Water: 0.79 sq mi (2.05 km^{2})
- Elevation: 157 ft (48 m)

Population (2020)
  - Total: 34,135
  - Density: 2,207.7/sq mi (852.38/km^{2})
- Time zone: UTC-5 (Eastern (EST))
  - Summer (DST): UTC-4 (EDT)
- ZIP code: 10956
- Area code: 845
- FIPS code: 36-50100
- GNIS feature ID: 0958400

New City is a hamlet and census-designated place in the town of Clarkstown in Rockland County, New York, United States, part of the New York metropolitan area. A suburb of New York City, the hamlet is located 18 miles (29 km) north of the city at its closest point, Riverdale, Bronx. Within Rockland County, New City is located north of Bardonia, northeast of Nanuet, east of New Square and New Hempstead, south of West Haverstraw and the village of Haverstraw, and west of Congers (across Lake DeForest). New City's population was 35,101 at the 2020 census, making it the 14th most populous CDP/hamlet in the state of New York.

New City is the county seat, seat of the town of Clarkstown and the location of the Clarkstown Police Department, Rockland County Sheriff's office and corrections facility. The downtown area is one of the main business districts in the county. The ZIP code of New City is 10956.

== History ==
Before the Revolutionary War, the land that would later become known as New City was inhabited mostly by Lenni Lenape American Indians. The Dutch were the first Europeans to settle in the area. Orange County was established in 1683 as one of the first 12 counties in Province of New York, which included present day Rockland County. In 1780, Major John André and Josh Hett Smith stopped at Coe's Tavern, located on what is now the corner of New Hempstead Road and Route 45.

New City was formed in 1798, when Rockland County was incorporated as a separate county from the south-easternmost portion of Orange County. With the formation of a new county, there were needs for a new county seat. The central location of New City was a convenient location for a county seat, since travel in 1798 was difficult, and the existing main towns in the county were not centrally located. At the time, the Squadron Cavalry of New York City had a summer encampment of what is now the busy streets of Squadron Boulevard and Cavalry Drive, hence how these streets were named. The community got its name because the founding fathers envisioned a "new" city when forming the new county seat.

Other than county and town government, the early downtown area consisted mainly of small retail shops in what was mainly an agricultural area. There was also a county fairgrounds and racetrack located on the Route 304 and Congers Road intersection.

In 1918, Paramount Pictures founder Adolph Zukor moved to New City where he bought 300 acres of land from Lawrence Abraham which already had a large house, a swimming pool, and a 9-hole golf course on the property. Two years later, in 1920, Zukor bought 500 more acres from Abraham and built multiple additions including a night house, guest house, greenhouses, garages, and more. He also hired A.W. Tillinghast to build an 18-hole championship golf course on the property. The land is now currently known as Paramount Country Club. Zukor Park, located just south of the country club, is also named after the producer. Zukor's property attracted a large number of artistic people to the area; including Maxwell Anderson, Henry Varnum Poor, Norman Lloyd, Kurt Weill, Martha MacGuffie, Lotte Lenya, John Houseman and more who all lived on South Mountain Road and formed an artist colony there.

Dutch Gardens, the oldest remaining park in the county, was built in 1934 by Italian artisans, known for its unique patterned brickwork. It was designed by West Nyack native Mary Mowbray-Clark. It was honored as the 1934 Garden of the Year by Better Homes and Gardens Magazine. It was listed on the National Register of Historic Places in 1991. Located just south of the courthouse in the downtown area, it is still one of the most commonly visited parks in Rockland County today.

New City remained rural in character until the 1950s, when the idea of post-World War II suburbia, as well as the opening of the Tappan Zee Bridge and Palisades Interstate Parkway, made traveling between New York City and Rockland County faster, and easier. Many former New York City residents migrated to Rockland, which transformed New City from a quiet rural community to a busy populated suburb of New York City. Along with residential development, business development increased rapidly as well. The downtown area became home to many banks, retail, and real-estate companies; as well as restaurants, shops, a movie theater, bars, and many other forms of entertainment. Certain parts of the town, such as South Mountain Road and Lake Lucille, have been preserved, and remain quiet, wooded, historic old-wealth neighborhoods.

== Geography ==
New City is accessible from major Rockland arteries providing rapid access to Bergen County, New Jersey, Westchester County, Manhattan, and the Bronx in New York City.

Neighborhoods include New City Condominiums, South Mountain Road, and Dellwood Park (Dellwood Park, The Dells).

== Demographics ==
Historical population
Census	Pop.	Note	%±
2020	34,135		—
U.S. Decennial Census

Historical populations
Census year	Population
1940	1,000*
1950	1,000*
1960	4,000*
1970	27,300*
1980	35,859
1990	33,673
2000	34,038
* Source document from Rockland County, not Census Bureau. Document.

=== 2020 census ===
As of the 2020 census, New City had a population of 34,135. The median age was 43.9 years. 22.3% of residents were under the age of 18 and 20.2% of residents were 65 years of age or older. For every 100 females there were 96.3 males, and for every 100 females age 18 and over there were 92.7 males age 18 and over.

100.0% of residents lived in urban areas, while 0.0% lived in rural areas.

There were 11,095 households in New City, of which 35.7% had children under the age of 18 living in them. Of all households, 68.8% were married-couple households, 9.5% were households with a male householder and no spouse or partner present, and 19.0% were households with a female householder and no spouse or partner present. About 15.5% of all households were made up of individuals and 9.3% had someone living alone who was 65 years of age or older.

There were 11,444 housing units, of which 3.0% were vacant. The homeowner vacancy rate was 0.8% and the rental vacancy rate was 4.7%.

Racial composition as of the 2020 census
Race	Number	Percent
White	22,170	64.9%
Black or African American	2,538	7.4%
American Indian and Alaska Native	88	0.3%
Asian	4,250	12.5%
Native Hawaiian and Other Pacific Islander	8	0.0%
Some other race	2,205	6.5%
Two or more races	2,876	8.4%
Hispanic or Latino (of any race)	5,082	14.9%

=== 2000 census ===
As of the 2000 census, there were 34,038 people, 11,030 households, and 9,496 families residing in the CDP. New City is 15.6 mi^{2} in area. The population density was 842.4 people/km^{2} (2,182 people/mi^{2}). There were 11,161 housing units at an average density of 715.3 units per square mile (276.2 units/km^{2}). The racial makeup of the CDP was 85.09% White, 4.67% African American, 0.08% Native American, 6.99% Asian, 0.02% Pacific Islander, 1.81% from other races, and 1.34% from two or more races. Hispanic or Latino of any race were 5.87% of the population. There were 11,030 households, out of which 40.2% had children under the age of 18 living with them, 76.1% were married couples living together, 7.5% had a female householder with no husband present, and 13.9% were non-families. 11.7% of all households were made up of individuals, and 5.2% had someone living alone who was 65 years of age or older. The average household size was 3.02 and the average family size was 3.27.

In the CDP, the population was spread out, with 25.7% under the age of 18, 6.1% from 18 to 24, 26.3% from 25 to 44, 30.1% from 45 to 64, and 11.9% who were 65 years of age or older. The median age was 40 years. For every 100 females, there were 96.0 males. For every 100 females age 18 and over, there were 92.5 males.

=== 2007 estimate ===
As of a 2007 estimate, the median income for a household in the CDP was $117,734 and the median income for a family was $128,200. Males had a median income of $62,234 versus $43,028 for females. The per capita income for the CDP was $37,519. About 2.2% of families and 3.7% of the population were below the poverty line in 2007.

== Arts and culture ==
=== Historical markers ===
- Collyer Farm Pond and New City Park
- H. R. Stevens House
- Blauvelt House
- Rockland County Courthouse and Dutch Gardens
- Martinus Hogenkamp Cemetery
- One Germonds

=== Landmarks and places of interest ===
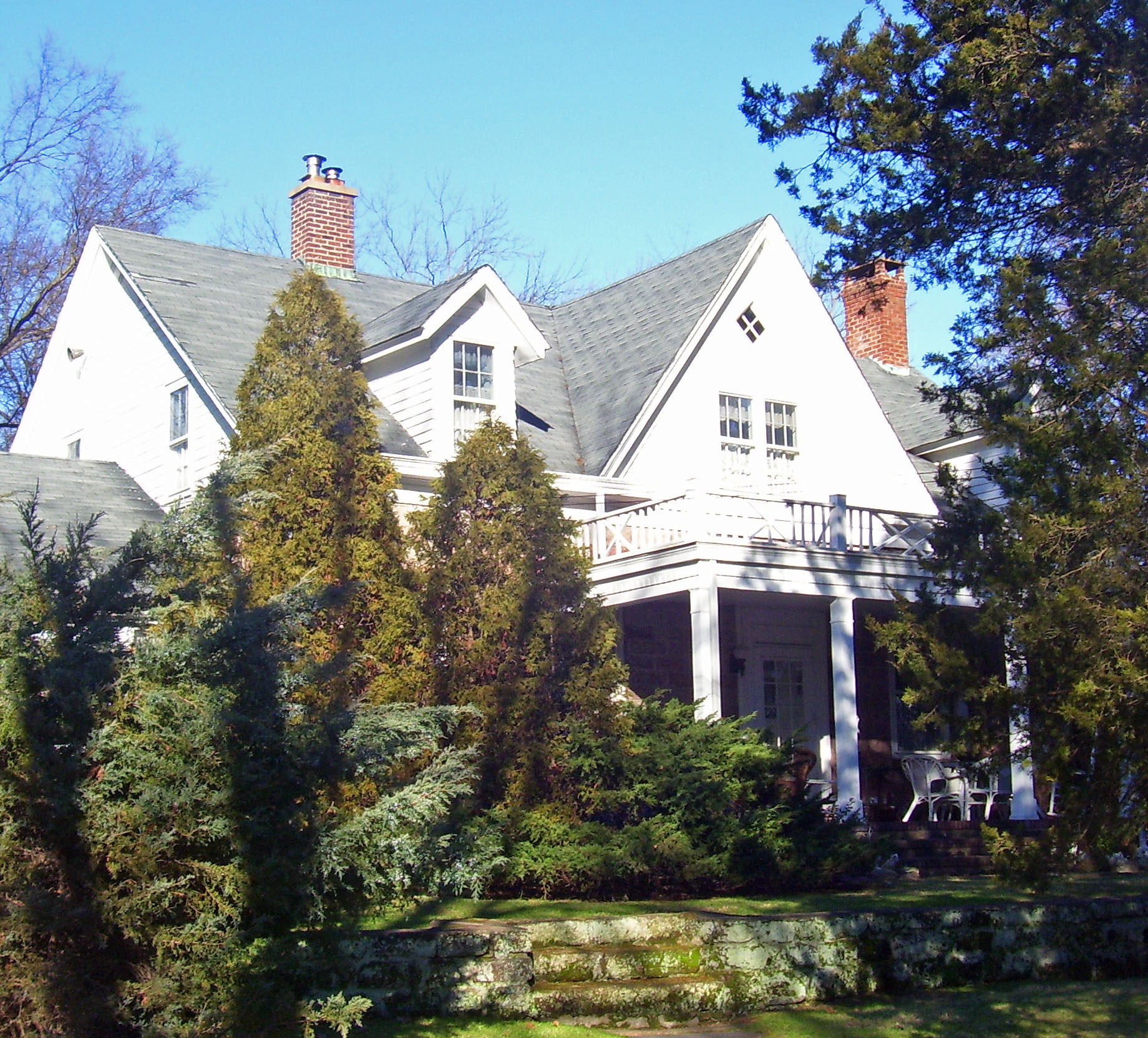
H.R. Stevens House

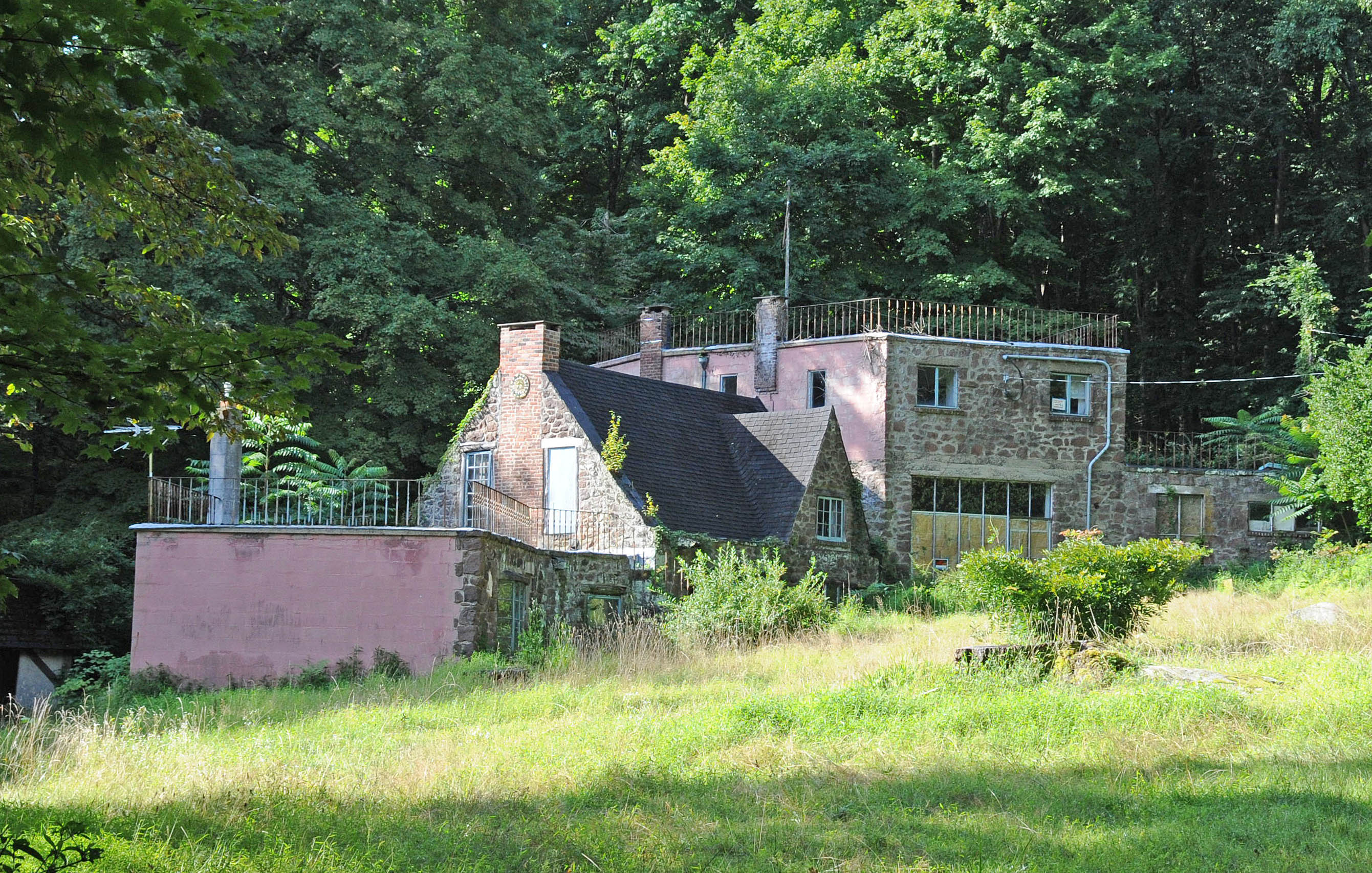
HENRY_VARNUM_POOR_house

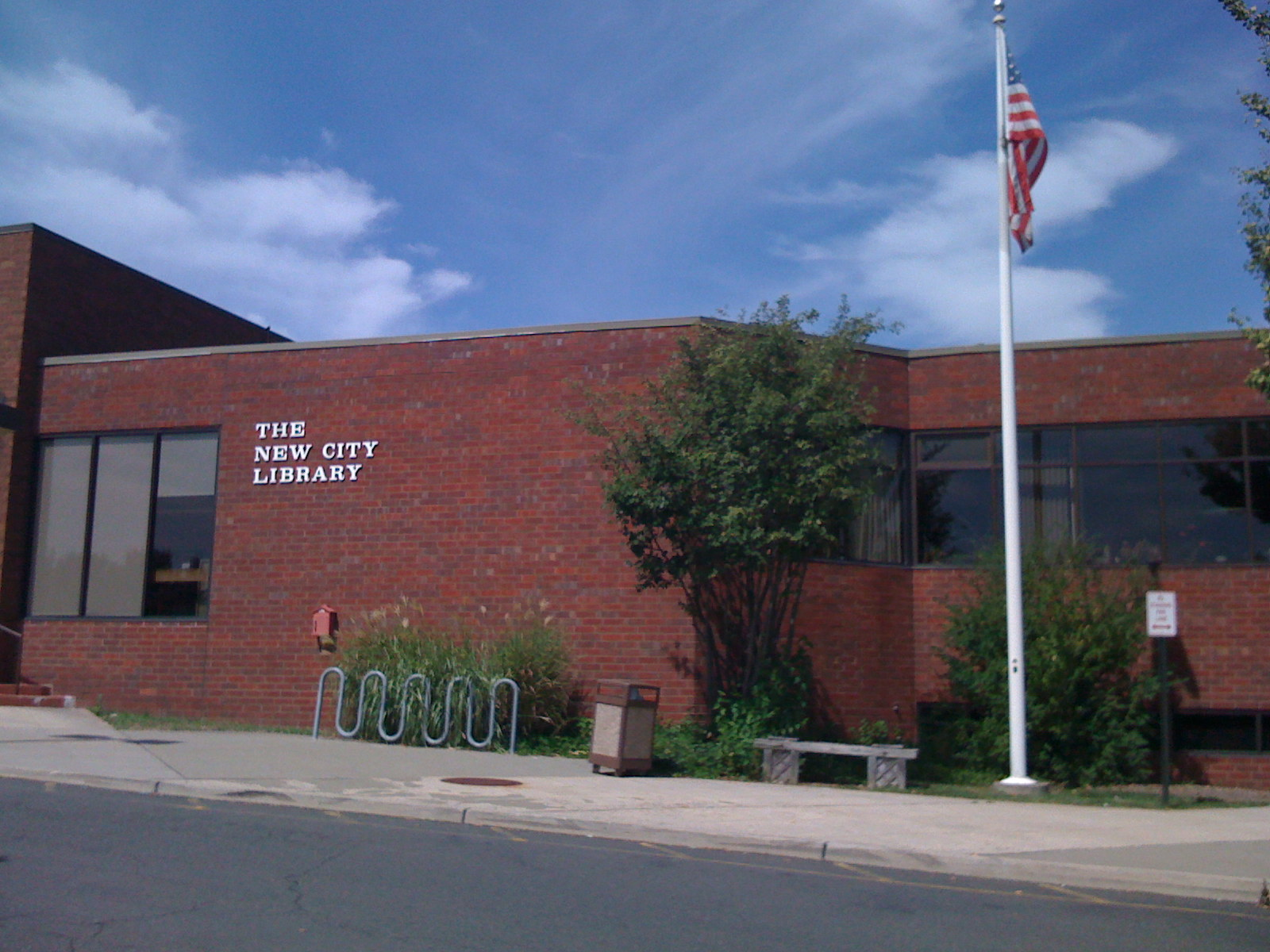
New City Free Library

- Dutch Garden – Designed by Mary Horgan Mowbray-Clarke, a West Nyack native, in 1933–34 as memorial to the county's early settlers, it won "Garden of the Year" from Better Home and Gardens magazine in 1935. Master craftsman Biaglo Gugliuzzo of Garnerville created walks and latticed walls of Haverstraw brick. Still standing is the Tea House, with carvings of mountains, windmills and other serene symbols representing aspects of Dutch-American history, others of motifs popular in the 1930s – Popeye, the Baker Cocoa and Old Dutch Cleanser maids. Over the years, it served as a site for weddings and for concerts. Folk singer Burl Ives once performed there and Eleanor Roosevelt visited the garden. Markers on site. It is now a county park with a beautiful display of flowering bulbs in spring. The life size statue of Thurgood Marshall Human Rights Monument is located at the garden outside the Rockland County courthouse.

(NRHP)

- H. R. Stevens House – 234 Congers Road (NRHP)
- High Tor Mountain. The highest peak of the Palisades Range. The Southern base is in New City. The peak is in Haverstraw.
- Jacob Blauvelt Farmhouse, 20 Zukor Road – A farmhouse of Dutch colonial style built 1882. Contains an open fireplace for cooking demonstrations. The 4-acre (16,000 m^{2}) site also has a museum, herb garden and nature trail. (NRHP)
- New City Free Library – 220 North Main Street
- Peter DePew House – 101 Old Route 304 (NRHP)
- South Mountain Road – A winding, two-lane historic road.
- Pojn Hill - A nickname based on a local legend for Trout Court.

== Notable people ==
- Keith Bulluck, American football player
- Tracy Wolfson, sportscaster
- Adam Schein, sportscaster
- Adam Rodriguez, actor, screenwriter and director
- Skylar Astin, actor
- Corey Baker (born 1989), baseball pitcher
- Julie Buxbaum, author
- John Masters, author
- Thomas Morahan (1931–2010), New York State Senator and State Assemblyman
- Hayden Panettiere, actress
- Henry Varnum Poor (1888–1970), architect, painter, sculptor, muralist, and potter. Designed the Henry Varnum Poor House in New City.
- Hugo Robus, sculptor
- Sam Rosen, sportscaster
- Phil Rosenthal, TV writer and producer. Creator of Everybody Loves Raymond
- Jordan Rudess, keyboard player for Dream Theater
- William Sloane, publisher and writer of fantasy and science fiction literature
- Bill Crow, jazz bassist
