= National Register of Historic Places listings in Rockland County, New York =

Location of Rockland County in New York

List of the National Register of Historic Places listings in Rockland County, New York

This is intended to be a complete list of properties and districts listed on the National Register of Historic Places in Rockland County, New York. The locations of National Register properties and districts (at least for all showing latitude and longitude coordinates below) may be seen in a map by clicking on "Map of all coordinates". There are three properties and districts that are further designated U.S. National Historic Landmarks.

This National Park Service list is complete through NPS recent listings posted October 16, 2026.

Contents: Counties in New York
Albany (Albany) – Allegany – Bronx – Broome – Cattaraugus – Cayuga – Chautauqua – Chemung – Chenango – Clinton – Columbia – Cortland – Delaware – Dutchess (Poughkeepsie, Rhinebeck) – Erie (Buffalo) – Essex – Franklin – Fulton – Genesee – Greene – Hamilton – Herkimer – Jefferson – Kings – Lewis – Livingston – Madison – Monroe (Rochester) – Montgomery – Nassau – New York (Below 14th Street, 14th to 59th Streets, 59th to 110th Streets, Above 110th Street, Islands) – Niagara (Niagara Falls) – Oneida – Onondaga (Syracuse) – Ontario – Orange – Orleans – Oswego – Otsego – Putnam – Queens – Rensselaer – Richmond – Rockland – St. Lawrence – Saratoga – Schenectady – Schoharie – Schuyler – Seneca – Steuben – Suffolk – Sullivan – Tioga – Tompkins – Ulster – Warren – Washington – Wayne – Westchester (Northern, Southern, New Rochelle, Peekskill, Yonkers) – Wyoming – Yates

== Listings county-wide ==
	Name on the Register	Image	Date listed	Location	City or town	Description
1	Maj. John Andre Monument	Maj. John Andre Monument	November 8, 2006 (#06001001)	42 Andre Hill; 41°01′17″N 73°57′19″W	Tappan	Site of Major John André's hanging and burial
2	Bear Mountain Bridge	Bear Mountain Bridge	November 23, 1982 (#82001266)	NY 6/202; 41°19′12″N 73°58′49″W	Stony Point	First crossing of Hudson north of New York City; built 1924 by Harriman family and later turned over to state
3	Bear Mountain Inn	Bear Mountain Inn	September 20, 2002 (#02001048)	Seven Lakes Drive; 41°18′47″N 73°59′25″W	Bear Mountain	1915 rustic lodge was among first improvements to Bear Mountain State Park
4	Big House	Big House	July 12, 1990 (#90001008)	US 9W near the junction with Closter Rd. 41°00′45″N 73°54′47″W	Palisades	
5	Blauvelt House	Blauvelt House	March 28, 1985 (#85000659)	20 Zukor Rd. 41°10′16″N 73°59′13″W	New City	
6	Blauvelt–Cropsey Farm	Blauvelt–Cropsey Farm	January 31, 2017 (#100000614)	230 S. Little Tor Rd. 41°07′57″N 74°00′03″W	New City	1790s sandstone farmhouse that incorporates Dutch and English building traditions; has remained a working family farm despite suburbanization of surrounding area
7	Brick Church Complex	Brick Church Complex	September 7, 1984 (#84002947)	Brick Church Rd. and NY 306; 41°08′25″N 74°03′55″W	New Hempstead	
8	Brook Chapel	Brook Chapel	February 14, 2010 (#09001287)	6th St. 41°07′29″N 74°10′35″W	Hillburn	
9	Brookside	Brookside	July 10, 2012 (#12000408)	406 N. Broadway; 41°06′20″N 73°55′05″W	Upper Nyack	
10	Camp Hill School	Camp Hill School	August 8, 2019 (#100004244)	100 Ladentown Road; 41°10′58″N 74°03′18″W	Pomona	Two-room schoolhouse built in 1923 remained in use until the 1960s; now Pomona's village hall
11	Christ Church	Christ Church	May 18, 2011 (#11000291)	416 Valentine Ave. 41°01′48″N 73°55′34″W	Sparkill	
12	Cliffside	Cliffside	July 12, 1990 (#90001012)	Lawrence Ln. south of River Rd. 41°00′28″N 73°54′14″W	Palisades	
13	Closter Road-Oak Tree Road Historic District	Closter Road-Oak Tree Road Historic District	July 12, 1990 (#90001014)	Roughly, north side of Closter Rd. and south side of Oak Tree Rd. approximately 0.5 miles (0.80 km) west of US 9W; 41°00′43″N 73°55′03″W	Palisades	
14	Abner Concklin House	Abner Concklin House	August 6, 1987 (#87001358)	Closter Rd. 41°00′26″N 73°55′14″W	Palisades	
15	Contempora House	Contempora House	April 29, 2009 (#09000260)	88 S. Mountain Rd. 41°10′58″N 74°01′03″W	New City	
16	De Wint House	De Wint House	October 15, 1966 (#66000568)	Livingston Ave. and Oak Tree Rd. 41°01′11″N 73°56′47″W	Tappan	Oldest house in county. Headquarters of George Washington: August 1780, September–October 1780, May 1783. Site of John André spy trial during American Revolutionary War.
17	John A. DeBaun Mill	John A. DeBaun Mill	September 2, 1993 (#93000852)	NY 59, N side, opposite Highview Ave. 41°06′45″N 74°06′16″W	Tallman	
18	Peter DePew House	Peter DePew House	July 3, 2008 (#08000596)	101 Old Route 304; 41°10′13″N 73°58′39″W	New City	
19	Dederer Stone House-Stonehurst	Dederer Stone House-Stonehurst	December 31, 2002 (#02001650)	82 Rockland Rd. 41°01′53″N 73°55′20″W	Orangetown	
20	English Church and Schoolhouse	English Church and Schoolhouse	November 23, 1977 (#77000980)	484 New Hempstead Rd. 41°08′59″N 74°01′58″W	New City	1827 Federal-style church built for first English congregation established in New York west of Hudson a century earlier is second-oldest church in county. 1863 schoolhouse was in use as a public school building for over a century.
21	William Ferdon House	William Ferdon House	May 18, 2011 (#11000292)	270 Ferdon Ave. 41°02′06″N 73°55′08″W	Piermont	
22	First Methodist Episcopal Church of Nyack	First Methodist Episcopal Church of Nyack	February 20, 1998 (#98000132)	North Broadway, south of the junction of North Broadway and Birchwood Ave. 41°06′12″N 73°55′04″W	Upper Nyack	
23	First Reformed Church	First Reformed Church	November 9, 2015 (#15000777)	361 Ferdon Ave. 41°02′12″N 73°55′11″W	Piermont	Wren-Gibbs Colonial Revival Church, built 1946, is home to oldest congregation in Piermont
24	Fraser-Hoyer House	Fraser-Hoyer House	April 22, 1976 (#76001270)	Treason Hill off U.S. 9W; 41°12′41″N 73°59′17″W	West Haverstraw	
25	John Green House	John Green House	June 7, 2017 (#100000615)	23 Main St. 41°05′26″N 73°54′58″W	Nyack	1819 stone house is believed to be the oldest in the village
26	Gurnee–Sherwood House	Gurnee–Sherwood House	July 19, 2011 (#11000451)	29 Spook Rock Road; 41°09′34″N 74°05′48″W	Wesley Hills	
27	Haddock's Hall	Haddock's Hall	June 20, 1991 (#91000103)	300 Ferdon Ave. 41°02′07″N 73°55′08″W	Piermont	
28	Haring-Eberle House	Haring-Eberle House	July 12, 1990 (#90001010)	US 9W north of Oak Tree Rd. 41°00′43″N 73°54′45″W	Palisades	
29	The Homestead	The Homestead	November 10, 1983 (#83004154)	143 Hudson Ave. 41°11′36″N 73°58′00″W	Village of Haverstraw	Farmhouse built ca. 1800 is one of oldest buildings in Haverstraw; residence of former mayor and other officials
30	Houser-Conklin House	Houser-Conklin House	October 1, 2010 (#10000808)	246 Route 306; 41°08′05″N 74°04′00″W	Monsey	
31	Edward Hopper Birthplace and Boyhood Home	Edward Hopper Birthplace and Boyhood Home	April 6, 2000 (#00000352)	82 North Broadway; 41°05′35″N 73°55′06″W	Nyack	
32	Hopson-Swan Estate	Hopson-Swan Estate	November 23, 1992 (#92001562)	US 9W east of Sparkill, Tallman Mountain State Park; 41°01′37″N 73°54′59″W	Sparkill	
33	Kings Daughters Public Library	Kings Daughters Public Library	August 9, 1991 (#91000950)	Jct. of Main and Allison Sts. 41°11′47″N 73°57′39″W	Village of Haverstraw	Recently renovated 1903 building was home to oldest chartered public library in county (now a branch)
34	Ladentown United Methodist Church	Ladentown United Methodist Church	September 7, 2005 (#05000990)	Ladentown Rd. 41°11′07″N 74°04′05″W	Pomona	
35	Little House	Little House	July 12, 1990 (#90001009)	US 9W north of Oak Tree Rd. 41°00′43″N 73°54′45″W	Palisades	
36	M/V COMMANDER	M/V COMMANDER	September 27, 1984 (#84002951)	Haverstraw Marina; 41°13′52″N 73°58′32″W	Village of Haverstraw	
37	Main School	Main School	August 5, 2015 (#15000516)	45 Mountain Ave. 41°07′30″N 74°10′11″W	Hillburn	Early 20th century wooden school was site of New York's biggest school desegregation battle
38	Carson McCullers House	Carson McCullers House	July 14, 2006 (#06000562)	131 S. Broadway; 41°05′09″N 73°55′11″W	South Nyack	
39	John D. McKean (fireboat)	John D. McKean (fireboat)	July 28, 2023 (#100009157)	Panco Petroleum Dock, 23 Grassy Point Rd. 41°13′31″N 73°57′58″W	Stony Point	
40	Robert W. and Mary F. McCready House	Robert W. and Mary F. McCready House	October 4, 2011 (#11000708)	139 Orange Turnpike; 41°09′51″N 74°11′34″W	Sloatsburg	Eclectic 1889 Victorian home of Irish immigrant builder whose firm was instrumental in the development of Sloatsburg during that era
41	Mount Moor African-American Cemetery	Mount Moor African-American Cemetery	August 29, 1994 (#94001001)	Dexter Rd., off NY 59A; 41°05′47″N 73°57′33″W	West Nyack	On the grounds of the Palisades Center mall.
42	Neiderhurst	Neiderhurst	July 12, 1990 (#90001011)	Ludlow Ln. south of River Rd. 41°00′35″N 73°54′29″W	Palisades	
43	North Main Street School	North Main Street School	February 28, 2008 (#08000105)	185 N. Main St. 41°07′22″N 74°02′36″W	Spring Valley	One of the earliest modern school buildings in the county, built in 1916 and expanded several times since. Now a satellite campus of Rockland Community College.
44	Old Sloatsburg Cemetery	Old Sloatsburg Cemetery	July 23, 1999 (#99000807)	Richards Rd. 41°09′13″N 74°11′48″W	Sloatsburg	Graves from late 18th to mid-20th centuries, including Sloat family members. Landscaping reflects different eras of cemetery design.
45	Onderdonk House	Onderdonk House	September 28, 2006 (#06000890)	748 Piermont Ave. 41°02′51″N 73°55′09″W	Piermont	
46	Palisades Interstate Park	Palisades Interstate Park	October 15, 1966 (#66000890)	W bank of the Hudson River; 40°57′19″N 73°55′54″W	Fort Lee	Extends through several NY and NJ counties.
47	Henry M. Peck House		November 2, 2000 (#00001279)	US 9W at Helen Hayes Hospital; 41°12′44″N 73°59′18″W	West Haverstraw	Destroyed by fire in 2002.
48	Jacob P. Perry House	Jacob P. Perry House	July 3, 2003 (#03000594)	15 Sickeletown Rd. 41°03′16″N 73°59′28″W	Pearl River	House dating from turn of 19th century is one of the last built in pre-Revolutionary Dutch Colonial style.
49	Philadelphia Toboggan Company Carousel Number 15	Philadelphia Toboggan Company Carousel Number 15	June 8, 2001 (#01000583)	1000 Palisades Center; 41°05′48″N 73°57′22″W	West Nyack	Formerly located in the Palisades Center but was removed in the summer of 2009.
50	Piermont Railroad Station	Piermont Railroad Station	December 3, 2008 (#08001146)	50 Ash Street; 41°02′30″N 73°55′06″W	Piermont	
51	Pig Knoll School	Pig Knoll School	July 8, 2019 (#100004183)	584 NY 306; 41°10′13″N 74°04′03″W	Pomona	Rustic 1915 Arts and Crafts by Robb Wilder of Mead, McKim and White is today Pomona Cultural Center
52	Henry Varnum Poor House	Henry Varnum Poor House	December 11, 2007 (#07001258)	S. Mountain Rd. 41°11′01″N 74°00′59″W	New City	
53	Richard Pousette-Dart House and Studio	Richard Pousette-Dart House and Studio	December 23, 2019 (#100004802)	932 Haverstraw Road; 41°09′54″N 74°05′41″W	Suffern vicinity	1916 carriage house was later home to influential abstract expressionist painter Pousette-Dart
54	House at 352 Piermont Avenue	House at 352 Piermont Avenue	January 27, 2015 (#14001218)	352 Piermont Ave. 41°02′13″N 73°55′11″W	Piermont	Well-preserved 1780 stone house is one of few of its design in county
55	Rockland County Courthouse and Dutch Gardens	Rockland County Courthouse and Dutch Gardens	January 3, 1991 (#90002104)	Jct. of S. Main St. and New Hempstead Rd. 41°08′47″N 73°59′27″W	New City	
56	Rockland Print Works	Rockland Print Works	October 23, 2013 (#13000362)	55 W. Railroad Ave. 41°12′32″N 73°59′32″W	Garnerville	Surviving factory complex from area's industrial past
57	Rockland Road Bridge	Rockland Road Bridge	December 7, 2005 (#05001391)	Rockland Rd., (bounded by Piermont and Ferdon Aves.); 41°02′06″N 73°55′10″W	Piermont	
58	Rockland Road Bridge Historic District	Rockland Road Bridge Historic District	September 29, 2011 (#11000709)	Ferdon Ave., Rockland Rd. & S. Piermont Ave. 41°02′06″N 73°55′10″W	Piermont	
59	William H. Rose House	William H. Rose House	April 15, 1999 (#99000459)	110 Tomkin Ave. 41°14′00″N 73°59′04″W	Stony Point	Picturesque house of local businessman built ca. 1862 moved from original nearby location
60	Ross-Hand Mansion	Ross-Hand Mansion	September 8, 1983 (#83001787)	122 S. Franklin St. 41°05′12″N 73°55′23″W	South Nyack	
61	St. Paul's United Methodist Church	St. Paul's United Methodist Church	March 12, 2001 (#01000251)	S. Broadway and Division St. 41°05′13″N 73°55′22″W	Nyack	
62	St. Paul's Episcopal Church	St. Paul's Episcopal Church	July 2, 2008 (#08000593)	26 S. Madison Ave. 41°06′32″N 74°02′45″W	Spring Valley	
63	Edward Salyer House	Edward Salyer House	September 4, 1986 (#86002178)	241 S. Middletown Rd. 41°03′04″N 74°00′51″W	Pearl River	Rare surviving Dutch Colonial frame house, built in 1765. Believed to be oldest house in Pearl River.
64	Michael Salyer Stone House	Michael Salyer Stone House	December 31, 2002 (#02001654)	Blue Hill Rd. 41°03′07″N 73°59′16″W	Orangetown	1790 house has clapboard infill at gambrel roof's apex, much more common for Ulster County stone houses. May reflect Huguenot influence during construction.
65	Seaman–Knapp House	Seaman–Knapp House	May 24, 2012 (#12000311)	35 Ladentown Rd. 41°11′12″N 74°03′33″W	Pomona	
66	Seven Oaks Estate	Seven Oaks Estate	July 12, 1990 (#90001013)	End of Ludlow Ln. 41°00′26″N 73°54′33″W	Palisades	
67	Shadowcliff	Shadowcliff	April 7, 2014 (#14000131)	521 N. Broadway; 41°06′32″N 73°55′06″W	Upper Nyack	
68	Sloat House	Sloat House	November 5, 1974 (#74001301)	19 Orange Tpke. 41°09′02″N 74°11′38″W	Sloatsburg	Original 1755 home of Sloat family, added onto in 1810s. Has bullet holes from accidental shooting of John Sloat
69	Sloat's Dam and Mill Pond	Sloat's Dam and Mill Pond	April 6, 2000 (#00000344)	Off of Station Rd. 41°09′28″N 74°11′22″W	Sloatsburg	Only surviving dam of three on the upper Ramapo River dates to 1792. Powered Jacob Sloat's mills; used until 1955
70	Jacob Sloat House	Jacob Sloat House	December 22, 2006 (#06001144)	15 Liberty Rock Rd. 41°09′19″N 74°11′43″W	Sloatsburg	Also known as Harmony Hall. 1848 retirement home of local textile merchant who gave village its name illustrates transition from Greek Revival to Picturesque in American architecture.
71	Sparkill Creek Drawbridge	Sparkill Creek Drawbridge	March 28, 1985 (#85000658)	Bridge St. over Sparkill Creek; 41°02′14″N 73°54′58″W	Piermont	
72	H. R. Stevens House	H. R. Stevens House	January 14, 2005 (#04001480)	234 Congers Rd. 41°09′02″N 73°58′24″W	New City	1775 house of locally quarried sandstone shows convergence of Dutch and English vernacular building traditions. Frame Federal style expansion done in 1820s.
73	Stony Point Battlefield	Stony Point Battlefield	October 15, 1966 (#66000567)	North of Stony Point on U.S. 9W and 202; 41°14′32″N 73°58′25″W	Stony Point	
74	Stony Point District School No. 4	Stony Point District School No. 4	January 4, 2012 (#11001005)	Central Dr. at Cedar Flats Rd. 41°14′16″N 74°01′17″W	Stony Point	
75	Stony Point Lighthouse	Stony Point Lighthouse	May 29, 1979 (#79001626)	Stony Point Battlefield; 41°14′29″N 73°58′20″W	Stony Point	
76	Tallman–Budke and Vanderbilt–Budke–Traphagen Houses	Tallman–Budke and Vanderbilt–Budke–Traphagen Houses	July 3, 2017 (#100001266)	131 Germonds Road; 41°06′59″N 73°59′12″W	Clarkstown	1790 sandstone house, believed to be one of the oldest of that material in the county, and 1820s wooden farmhouse on same property.
77	Tappan Historic District	Tappan Historic District	April 26, 1990 (#90000689)	Roughly bounded by Main St./Kings Hwy., Andre Ave. and New York Central RR; 41°01′18″N 73°56′58″W	Tappan	
78	Tappan Zee Playhouse	Tappan Zee Playhouse	July 21, 1983 (#83001788)	20 S. Broadway; 41°05′24″N 73°55′09″W	Nyack	Demolished 2004.Cinema Treasures
79	Terneur-Hutton House	Terneur-Hutton House	April 23, 1973 (#73001263)	160 Sickelton Rd. 41°04′58″N 73°58′23″W	West Nyack	
80	Torne Brook Farm	Torne Brook Farm	May 19, 1988 (#88000611)	Torne Brook Rd. 41°08′25″N 74°09′48″W	Ramapo	
81	Upper Nyack Firehouse	Upper Nyack Firehouse	September 23, 1982 (#82004781)	330 N. Broadway; 41°06′06″N 73°55′04″W	Upper Nyack	
82	US Post Office-Haverstraw	US Post Office-Haverstraw	November 17, 1988 (#88002497)	86 Main St. 41°11′46″N 73°57′39″W	Village of Haverstraw	High level of ornament on 1934 building may be due to influence of native James Farley, then Postmaster General
83	US Post Office-Nyack	US Post Office-Nyack	May 11, 1989 (#88002387)	48 S. Broadway; 41°05′19″N 73°55′11″W	Nyack	Rare Classical Revival post office built after World War I
84	US Post Office-Pearl River	US Post Office-Pearl River	November 17, 1988 (#88002399)	35 S. Main St. 41°03′29″N 74°01′20″W	Pearl River	Unique 1935 post office with highly restrained Colonial Revival design showing a strong modernist influence. Officially renamed in 2005 for local Vietnam War MIA
85	US Post Office-Spring Valley	US Post Office-Spring Valley	May 11, 1989 (#88002432)	7 N. Madison Ave. 41°06′47″N 74°02′46″W	Spring Valley	Colonial Revival design of 1936 post office, unique in state, emphasizes Greek Revival precedents of style
86	US Post Office-Suffern	US Post Office-Suffern	May 11, 1989 (#88002435)	15 Chestnut St. 41°06′59″N 74°09′10″W	Suffern	1930s building combining elements of Streamline Moderne and Colonial Revival styles; inside features relief of Communication as a semi-nude woman shooting a flaming arrow.
87	The USCO Church	The USCO Church	May 3, 2016 (#16000225)	21 Church St. 41°12′24″N 73°59′42″W	Garnerville	19th-century wooden former Methodist church used by late-1960s art collective USCO
88	Van Houten's Landing Historic District	Van Houten's Landing Historic District	August 20, 2004 (#04000877)	North Broadway, School St., Ellen St., Castle Heights Ave., Van Houten St. 41°06′02″N 73°55′00″W	Upper Nyack	
89	Washington Avenue Soldier's Monument and Triangle	Washington Avenue Soldier's Monument and Triangle	July 26, 2006 (#06000646)	Washington Avenue Triangle (Jct. of Washington and Lafayette Aves.); 41°06′53″N 74°09′01″W	Suffern	Memorial to local World War I dead on site where Washington and Lafayette camped features small cannon left over from Revolution
90	Washington Spring Road-Woods Road Historic District	Washington Spring Road-Woods Road Historic District	July 12, 1990 (#90001015)	Roughly, area along Washington Spring Rd. from Highland Ave. to the Hudson River and north approximately 0.5 miles (0.80 km) along Woods Rd. 41°00′42″N 73°54′26″W	Palisades	
91	Former Wayside Chapel	Former Wayside Chapel	April 6, 2000 (#00000346)	24 River Rd. 41°04′24″N 73°55′14″W	Grand View-on-Hudson	
92	J. Garner West House		March 17, 2022 (#100007379)	168 Filors Ln. 41°13′09″N 74°00′22″W	Stony Point	

== Former listing ==
	Name on the Register	Image	Date listed	Date removed	Location	City or town	Description
1	Henry Garner Mansion		August 14, 1973 (#73001262)	April 24, 1979	18 Railroad Ave.	West Haverstraw	Demolished on June 10, 1976.

== See also ==
- National Register of Historic Places listings in New York
