= H. R. Stevens House =

Historic house in New York, United States

- H.R. Stevens House
- U.S. National Register of Historic Places
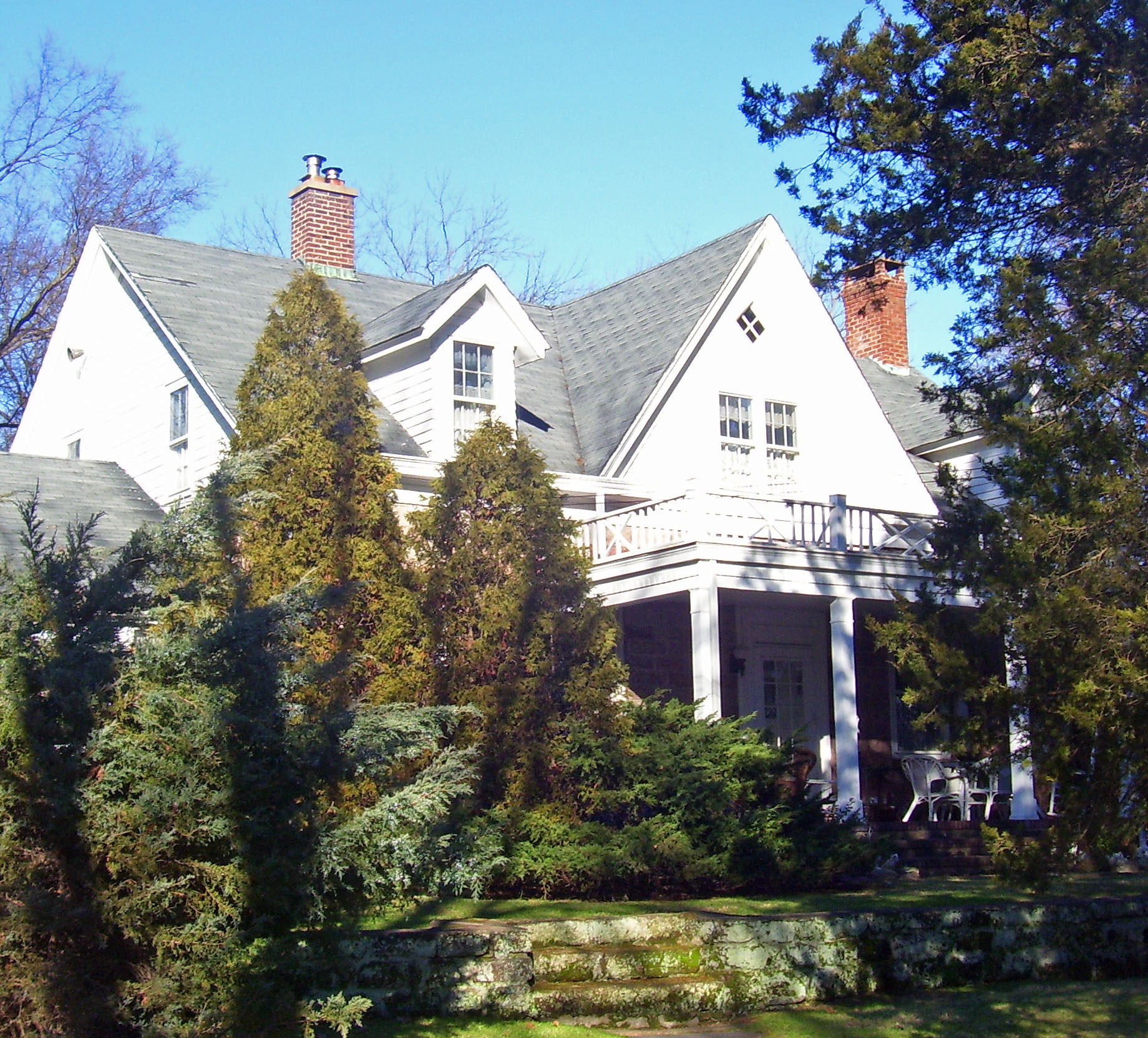
- South elevation, 2008

- Location within New York Location within the United States
- Location: New City, NY
- Nearest city: Hackensack, NJ
- Coordinates: 41°9′3″N 73°58′21″W
- Area: 0.9 acres (3,600 m^{2})
- Built: 1775
- Architectural style: Colonial, Federal
- NRHP reference No.: 04001480
- Added to NRHP: January 14, 2005

The H.R. Stevens House is located on Congers Road (Rockland County Route 80) in the New City section of the Town of Clarkstown, New York, United States. It is a stone house dating to the late 18th century. In the early 19th century, it was expanded with some wood frame upper stories added later. The interior was also renovated over the course of the century.

It shows the convergence of Dutch and English building traditions in the later years of the colonial Hudson Valley. In 2005, it was listed on the National Register of Historic Places.

== Building ==
The house is located on a small lot on the northern side of Congers Road where it bends to the northeast midway between New York State Route 304 at downtown New City and its crossing of DeForest Lake, west of Congers itself. It is on the fringe of a residential area, with large institutional buildings to the southwest along its side of Congers and Clarkstown High School North and its baseball diamonds and football field across the road. All the lots in the generally level suburban area are buffered from each other by strips of woodland.

A paved driveway curves in front of the house before ending in front of a stone and wood frame garage. It is sympathetic architecturally but not considered a contributing resource to the listing since it is too modern. A small coursed limestone retaining wall in the front elevates the house slightly.

=== Exterior ===
The house itself is a one-and-a-half-story five-by-two-bay structure of locally quarried pink-red sandstone set in load-bearing walls. It is topped with a steeply pitched cross-gabled roof shingled in asphalt, pierced by gabled dormer windows and two brick chimneys at either end. It has a one-story attached frame wing on the west.

The east (front) facade is mostly screened from view by tall evergreen plantings. A wood porch projects from the center of the ground floor. Four square piers support a flat roof with balustrade. At the top of the stone section of the wall is a molded cornice and plain fascia. Above it the gable field is sided in clapboard with a pair of windows and a small lozenge-shaped window in the apex. It has a molded cornice at the roofline.

On the north elevation the frieze and cornice at the top of the stone wall continue around the corner and terminate in returns. The basement window on that side shows the signs of having once been an entrance. The west (rear) has a centrally located door and three windows, with the southernmost having an unusually large lintel. At the roof is a shed dormer with five windows. The two-bay frame wing has a small pent-roofed porch over the door on its rear elevation.

=== Interior ===
The main entrance, a replica Dutch door set in a molded casing, opens into a full-depth center passage. The stair to the upper floor, with turned Italianate newel posts and balusters, is on the south side. Two rooms original to the house are on the north. They are of roughly equal size, with an entryway between them larger than is typical for two late 18th-century parlors.

Paneled wainscoting is on the lower walls, with lath and plaster finishing above and on the ceiling. The deeply recessed windows reveal the width of the walls. Both parlors have fireplaces with Federal style wooden mantels with a five-part entablature, beveled panels and bulbous colonettes on the front one. The rear substitutes a molded frieze for the colonettes but has a similar five-part structure. The hearthstones are red sandstone similar to the exterior; the floors are thin width oak.

On the opposite side of the central hall are two smaller rooms added onto the original house later. The larger rear one is now a dining room, with a door connecting it to the kitchen in the frame wing. Upstairs in the main block is an L-shaped hallway with five rooms clustered around it.

Below the main block is a fully excavated basement; while the wing has only crawl space. On the basement ceiling exposed hewn beams run from front to rear. A concrete block wall in the middle supports them and divides the basement into two rooms. On the north wall are the stone supports for the chimneys, consisting of piers with heavy timber lintels. There are slots for shelving in between. In the northeastern corner is an old board-and-batten door that once provided egress.

== History ==
In the absence of property records, which go back for the house only to 1827, it has been determined from the construction that it was most likely built around 1775, since dressed stone was used on all elevations (earlier houses would have used it only on the front facade). The stone walls reflect Dutch influence waning in the area at that time; the original three-bay interior layout, with a sidehall plan and jambed fireplaces in both rooms, is English in origin, as are the dimensions of the timber beams in the basement. The porch covers the area where any datestone would likely be located; these, however, are not always accurate.

Its original exterior may have been fairly similar to the Lozier House in Midland Park, New Jersey, to the south. The other two bays may not have been added to the main block until as late as 1820, as suggested by the Federal style fireplaces. A clear break in the masonry of the basement wall shows where the extension began. Stevens, former town clerk and the earliest known owner, moved in around 1827.

The next significant change to the house likely took place around 1860. At that time the Italianate style of the newel posts and balusters was current. They replaced a simpler, enclosed original stair.

The dormers and cross-gable may have been added then as well. Another possibility is that they were added closer to the turn of the 20th century, possibly in imitation of the very similar treatment of the Big House in Palisades, elsewhere in Rockland County. However, a similar treatment is also found on the 18th-century Abram Ackerman House just south of the state line in Saddle River, New Jersey, and it seems to have been a common retrofitting for 18th-century houses that had survived to the middle of the following century, in order to bring light and air into their previously unventilated garrets, often accompanying their conversion into bedrooms.

== See also ==
- National Register of Historic Places listings in Rockland County, New York
