= Jacob P. Perry House =

Historic house in New York, United States

- U.S. National Register of Historic Places
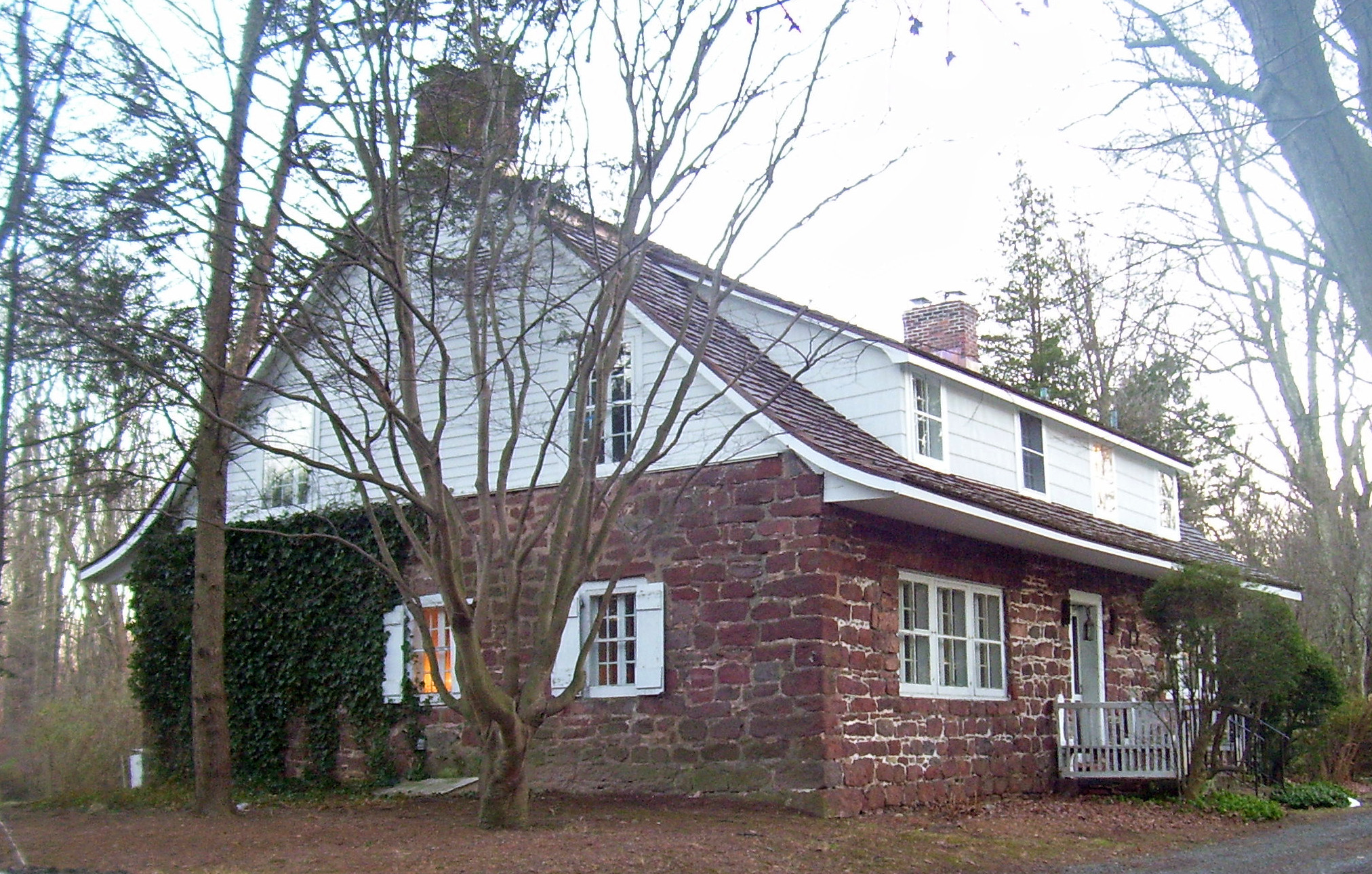
- North profile and west elevation of main block, 2008

- Location within New York Location within the United States
- Location: Pearl River, NY
- Nearest city: Paterson, NJ
- Coordinates: 41°3′16″N 73°59′26″W
- Area: 5 acres (2.0 ha)
- Built: 1796
- Architectural style: Colonial
- NRHP reference No.: 03000594
- Added to NRHP: July 3, 2003

The Jacob P. Perry House is a historic home on Sickletown Road in Pearl River, New York, United States. It was constructed around the end of the 18th century, one of the last houses in Rockland County to have been built in the Dutch Colonial style more common before the Revolution.

It is a stone structure with a detailed period interior. A later owner renovated it during the 1930s, and an addition was built onto it in the late 1970s. There are several other buildings and structures on the property, the remnant of a former farm. In 2003 the house and an adjacent well and wellhouse were listed on the National Register of Historic Places.

== Buildings and grounds ==
The house and outbuildings occupy a 5-acre (2.0 ha) lot at the south corner of the three-way intersection of Sickletown Road and Gilbert Avenue (Rockland County Route 26), an area of Pearl River known as Nauraushaun. The terrain is level, with a steep drop to the reflecting the proximity of Lake Tappan and the Hackensack River basin. Large trees grow around the property, in keeping with the suburban character of the area. Surrounding properties are all residential.

The main house itself is near the north corner of the lot, with an unpaved driveway from Sickletown running up to its west (front, originally the rear) elevation. Its main block is a one-and-a-half-story five-by-two-bay structure of dressed red sandstone blocks laid in rough courses, a bit more randomly on the south. The south and north roof fields are sided in clapboard It is topped with a broad gambrel roof with flared outward eaves shingled in split cedar shakes. On either side is a continuous shed-roofed dormer window; brick chimneys rise from either end. A sympathetic hyphen connects it to a modern wood frame addition on the south.

On the east elevation, the house's original front facade, is a centrally located main entrance flanked by two windows on either side, echoed in the dormer fenestration above. Most of this is shielded by closely planted shrubbery and an awning over the entrance, a double Dutch door with original strap hinges. On the west, what is now the recessed front entrance has a small wooden porch with two wooden benches along the sides facing each other. It is flanked by a set of triple casement windows on either side. The north and south elevations are similar despite the hyphen on the latter, echoed by ivy on the other end. There are two windows on the attic level and a set of louvered quarter-rounds high in the gable field. The only difference is on the first story, where the south side has a wooden door into the hyphen, complemented by a French door to the exterior, whereas the north side has two windows to the west of the ivy with paneled wooden shutters.

=== Interior ===
Inside, the house has a center-hall plan and many original finishings. From the former main entrance there are six-paneled doors, cased in molded architraves leading to the parlor on the north, the dining room to the south and the other half of the entrance hall on the west, which also provides access to a small bathroom and closet. A stair with newel and squared balusters is against the south wall. Walls and ceilings are plaster with a molded chair rail.

In the north parlor is a large fireplace with a detailed Federal style mantelpiece. It has a thin corniced molding, reeded frieze, fluted pilasters and three large hearthstones in front. Next to the chimney is a Colonial Revival dishware cabinet with glazed paired doors in a round, keystoned arch and similar paneled doors below. Thirty-foot (9.1 m) tulip beams with beaded edges run the length of the ceiling.

The dining room fireplace is in a large projecting chimney breast with a simple wood mantel and similar hearthstones in front. A small separate room may be original; it is currently used as the kitchen. Its entrance door has a molded casing and a filled-in transom opening; it may be an exterior door reused from another location. French doors lead into the hyphen.

Upstairs, the second floor has five rooms and two bathrooms with Federal detailing, including doors similar to the main entrance hall. In the attic are original hewn roof timber framing and rough sheathing. The rafters rise from end plates to a purlin where the roof pitch changes. Rising from the center beam is a vertical member joined to the horizontal collar by mortise and tenon. The cellar has stone-arch supports for the fireplaces above and a cold storage area.

=== Outbuildings ===
Immediately south of the house is a modern wooden cottage. Also on the property is a stone and wood barn. These, along with the addition, make up the other three buildings on the property, none of which contribute to the Register listing.

To the east is a stone-lined cistern, topped with a circular wellhouse of red sandstone and frame. Both of them are of the same historic period as the house and are considered contributing structures. The other structure, an ornamental pond, was added more recently and does not contribute.

== History ==
The land on which the house sits was originally part of the late 17th century Kakiat Patent, covering portions of what is today Rockland County and adjacent Bergen County, New Jersey. After the Revolutionary War, Michael Salyer, who had built a house nearby, sold the western portion of his land to Peter Perry.

Whether the house was built in two sections or as one is not clear. A 1936 history of the house by Rosalie Bailey holds that it was, and if so, Perry may have built the west half of the house by 1796, although it is not certain he ever lived in it as he died elsewhere. It is equally possible that, like the similar nearby Sickels-Vanderbilt House, it was built as one.

Perry's will bequeathed the property to his son Jacob, who completed the current main house (if that was the case) in 1801. Its walls of locally quarried dressed red sandstone and broad gambrel roof with wide flared eaves reflect a Dutch Colonial building tradition much more common in houses built before the war. The Perry house is one of the last in that style from the period.

The interior, as it was built and refined over the next decades, reflects the then-popular Federal style. Jacob P. Perry died in 1839 and willed it to his son Jacob J. Perry, who died ten years later. From there it passed through other owners until it became the property of Clarence and Athens Chester around 1930.

The house had fallen into some disrepair by that time, and the Chesters undertook to renovate and restore it. In the process they made some changes. The most significant changes made to the exterior were the installation of casement windows, and the replacement of the single windows on the west elevation with the current bands of three. On the south elevation they added the front windows. Inside, they installed doors consistent with the other interior decoration and put the current oak flooring down over the original wide planking.

In 1955 the half-bath was added on the first floor. On the outside separate dormers were merged into the current continuous band. Two decades later, in 1978, the hyphen and south addition were added. There have been no other modifications to the house since. It continues to be a private residence.

== See also ==
- National Register of Historic Places listings in Rockland County, New York
