= Winthrop Sargent Gilman =

American banker and abolitionist (1808–1884)

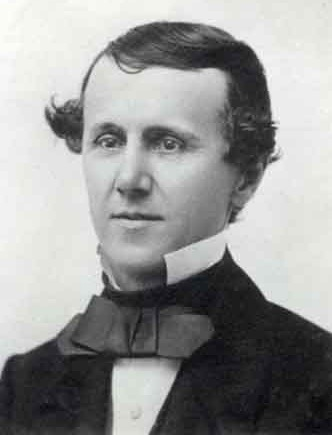
- Gilman, ca. 1860
- Born: March 28, 1808; Marietta, Ohio
- Died: October 1, 1884 (aged 76); Palisades, New York
- Resting place: Greenwood Cemetery, Brooklynn
- Known for: banker, abolitionist
- Spouse: Abia Swift Lippincott

Winthrop Sargent Gilman (28 March 1808 – 1 October 1884) was head of the banking house of Gilman, Son & Co. in New York City. Born and raised in Ohio, he had parents and ancestors from New England. Part of the family had already established the banking business in New York. Gilman developed as a businessman in the northwest region with wide interests.

While residing in Alton, Illinois, in the 1830s, he managed a number of groceries in the region, especially in St. Louis, Missouri in the antebellum period. He was an abolitionist and on November 7, 1837, had helped defend one of his warehouses, where he had allowed publisher Elijah Parish Lovejoy to hide a printing press for the Alton Observer from an pro-slavery mob. Lovejoy was killed in the altercation. After that, Gilman moved with his family to New York City, where he entered the family banking business. He lived and worked in the New York area for the rest of his life.

== Biography ==
Winthrop Sargent Gilman was born in 1808 in Marietta, Ohio to merchant Benjamin Ives Gilman and his wife Hannah (Robbins) Gilman. His father Benjamin, born in 1766, was a native of Exeter, New Hampshire. His ancestors were among the most prominent early settlers. His father Benjamin I. Gilman graduated in the first class of the Phillips Exeter Academy, a private preparatory school.

Gilman developed his business career in St. Louis, Missouri, where he was a merchant with major groceries and related businesses in the region. He resided across the Mississippi River in Alton, Illinois, a free state, and had a warehouse there with his partner Godfrey. Supporting the abolition movement, he allowed publisher Elijah Parish Lovejoy to hide a recently acquired printing press in a Gilman warehouse in Alton. (Three had been destroyed by pro-slavery activists.) In the ensuing riot, the angry mob killed Lovejoy and burned Gilman's warehouse to the ground.

Before the Civil War, Gilman moved to New York City and entered the family banking business. Gilman, Son & Co. in New York often acted in conjunction with the interests of the influential Brown family of Providence, Rhode Island, founders of Brown University. Subsequently, John Nicholas Brown and the Gilman Land Company, an offshoot of the Gilman family banking business, were involved in the development of the Gilman Block in Sioux City, Iowa, as well as other real estate properties.

== Marriage and family ==
In 1835, Gilman married Abia Swift (née Lippincott), daughter of Rev. Thomas Lippincott and his wife of Alton, Illinois. They had nine surviving children together, five sons, including Arthur (1837-1909), Winthrop S., Jr. (1839–1923), Theodore (1841–1930), and Benjamin Ives Gilman (1852-1933); and four daughters, including Alice Ives Gilman (1848-1927).

Gilman had an abiding interest in science. After he moved to the New York area, he built a private observatory at his family home known as 'Fern Lodge' at the Palisades, New York. There he frequently observed meteors.

== Legacy ==
Sons Arthur, Winthrop, and Theodore Gilman followed their father into the family banking firm.

After Arthur's health declined, he retired to his estate 'Glynllyn' in the Berkshires near Lee, Massachusetts, and returned to earlier literary interests. He became a writer on historical subjects and family history. About 1870 he moved to Cambridge, Massachusetts. He and his second wife in 1879 founded a women's educational institution, that developed as Radcliffe College, the women's college associated with Harvard University.

Theodore Gilman became noted for his research into banking. He introduced and presented bills to Congress from 1913 to 1918 to establish a higher order of banks to be based on bank assets. His work established the plan for the Federal Reserve Act. He also headed the Bible Society for years.

== Papers ==
Papers of Winthrop Sargent Gilman and his sons, and other Gilman family members, are available for research use at the Minnesota Historical Society. They include correspondence, diaries, newspaper clippings, scrapbooks, printed materials, and genealogical information.
