= Michael Salyer Stone House =

Historic house in New York, United States

- U.S. National Register of Historic Places
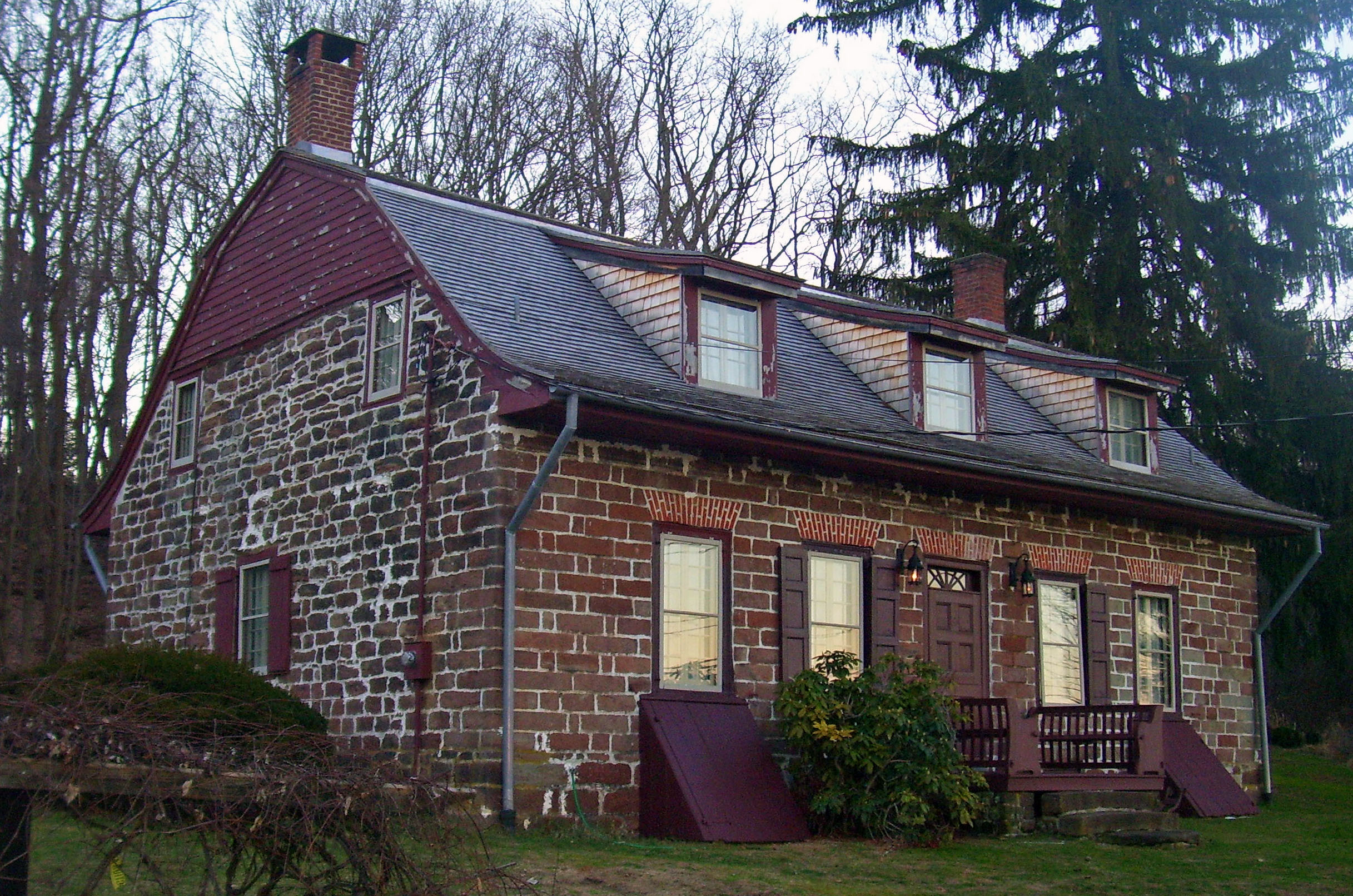
- South profile and east elevation, 2008

- Location within New York Location within the United States
- Location: Blue Hill Rd., Orangetown, New York
- Coordinates: 41°3′6″N 73°59′13″W
- Area: 8.3 acres (3.4 ha)
- Built: 1790
- Architectural style: Federal, Greek Revival
- NRHP reference No.: 02001654
- Added to NRHP: December 31, 2002

The Michael Salyer Stone House is located on Blue Hill Road (Rockland County Route 23) in Orangetown, New York, United States. It was built in the late 18th century.

Unusually for Rockland County, its gambrel roof has clapboard siding in the upper gable apexes, a feature normally found farther north, in Colonial stone houses in Ulster County. It is possible that this may be due to Huguenot influence. In 2002, it and its well were listed on the National Register of Historic Places. Today it serves as a local historical museum.

== Buildings and grounds ==
The house is on the west side of Blue Hill, 800 feet (240 m) south of its intersection with Sickletown and Convent roads, east of the village of Pearl River. It occupies an 8.3-acre (3.4 ha) lot overlooking Lake Tappan, a reservoir on the Hackensack River shared by New York and New Jersey, across the road. To the west and south is the Blue Hills Country Club golf course, buffered by woods. The land along Blue Hill to the north is also wooded, ending at some other residences along Sickletown.

From the west bound the land slopes down sharply, then gently, to the lake at the east. The house is on a small cleared section at the roadside with a lawn. A driveway to the south becomes a circular parking area. To the northwest is the old well and a frame shed.

The house itself is a one-and-a-half-story five-by-two-bay structure of rough-cut rectangular sandstone units on a rubblestone foundation. A small one-story frame kitchen wing projects from the north end of the west (rear) elevation. The centrally located main entrance on the east has a small stone porch with wooden benches backed by simple square balustrades on either side. Two bulkhead doors on the north and south corners of that elevation provide exterior access to the basement.

The slate-shingled gambrel roof is pierced by brick chimneys at the ends and three shed dormer windows on either elevation. Its wide overhanging eaves on the east and west elevations flare outwards; on the north and south it is flush. Clapboard is used in the gable apexes.

On the east (front) facade the blocks are laid in a Flemish bond pattern. The two windows flanking the main entrance have paneled wooden shutters; all and the doorway are topped with splayed brick lintels. On the sides the stonework reverts to a more random pattern. The north has two windows on either story; the south one on the first floor, with shutters, and two on top.

The main entrance is a recessed paneled wooden door with a radiating-muntin rectangular transom on top. It opens into a central hall that runs the depth of the house to the rear entrance, a heavy planked Dutch door with top light. Many original finishings remain, such as wall plaster, wide-plank flooring, moldings and architraves.

On the north is a parlor, the largest room in the house, covering the full depth of the building. It has a fireplace with Federal style mantel and built-in cupboard. The south parlor has a similar fireplace, and the room to the west is now the bathroom.

Stairs lead from the north parlor to the second floor, which also has a central hall. Its western end was converted into another bathroom. There are two bedrooms on either side of the hall.

== History ==
In 1783 the 380 acres (150 ha) of the Kakiat Patent where the house now stands were owned by Jeremias Mabie. He had built a house on the property and raised four daughters. That year one of them, Elizabeth Mabie, married Michael Salyer. It is believed that the house was at least under construction at the time of the wedding, as a present.

Gambrel roofs, originally used by English settlers in New England, became popular with Dutch settlers in the Hudson Valley during the 1760s. They could span a house two rooms deep yet provide more space for an attic than a gabled roof. The Michael Salyer House, with its wide upper and lower angles, is a regional variant more commonly found in the southern Hudson Valley, closer to New York City. It is known as a "Flemish roof" despite the lack of an apparent antecedent in European building traditions.

The house also has frame and clapboard infill in the gambrel apexes. This is rare for a Rockland County Dutch stone house, and much more common in Ulster County farther north on the west side of the Hudson Valley. It may be due to Jeremias Mabie, who like the early settlers of the New Paltz area was not descended from Dutch settlers but rather of French Huguenot extraction.

Salyer died in 1810, willing the house to his wife. She in turn passed it to her daughter Mary and her husband David Bogert upon her death the following year. From them it passed through a variety of owners for most of the 19th and 20th centuries, including the Blauvelt family, until it became property of the United Water Company. In 1992 it was donated to the Town of Orangetown, which uses it as a local history museum, curated by the Orangetown Historical Society.

After the donation, volunteers worked to restore the house. It opened as a museum with permanent exhibits in 1996. In 2007 it closed for more renovations, including a new roof and French drain system. The following year it reopened with three exhibits, one dedicated to Revolutionary War-era British spy Maj. John André.

== See also ==
- National Register of Historic Places listings in Rockland County, New York
