= Mollie Sneden =

American ferry operator

- Born: January 13, 1709; Dobbs Ferry, New York, British America
- Died: January 31, 1810 (aged 101); Palisades, New York, U.S.
- Occupations: Ferry Mistress; Public House owner
- Known for: Operating a river ferry; British sympathies during Revolutionary War
- Spouses: Robert Sneden Jr.; George Calhoun
- Parent(s): John and Abigail Dobbs

Mollie Sneden (January 13, 1709 – January 31, 1810) born as Mary Dobbs was the operator of a ferry service at Palisades, New York, in the United States, before and after the American Revolution. During the war she was prohibited from running the ferry because of her British sympathies. Mollie Sneden is listed as a Woman of Distinction by the New York Senate.

== Early life ==
Sneden was born Mary Dobbs in Westchester County, New York, in 1709. Her parents, John and Abigail Dobbs, baptized her in Tarrytown, New York. Sneden grew up with two half-brothers by her father's first wife and four siblings by her mother, his second wife. The Dobbs Family operated a ferry across the Hudson River. Ferry operation began with Mollie's half-brother, William, in 1730, departing from an Indian village called Wysquaqua, later Dobbs Ferry. (see "Dobbs Ferry: The Beginning" by Jean Fritz in The Ferryman newsletter published by Dobbs Ferry Historical Society, November 1993 The route of Dobbs Ferry across the Hudson River is recognized as one of the earliest of the Hudson ferry routes. Mollie's husband, Robert Sneden Jr., though a carpenter and farmer by trade, assisted William in running the ferry. It is not known if Mollie experienced ferry operations first-hand, but given her future vocation and both her family's and husband's connection to the trade, it is conceivable she did. The date of Robert Sneden's wedding with Mollie Dobbs is uncertain, but the birth of their first child is recorded as 1733. The couple continued living on the east side of the Hudson for several years, during which time they gave birth to four more children.

== West of the Hudson ==
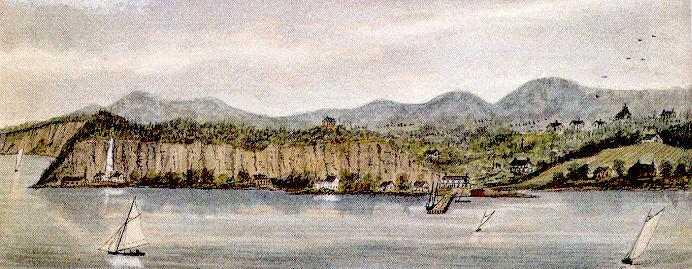
Snedens Landing by Robert Knox Sneden, 1858

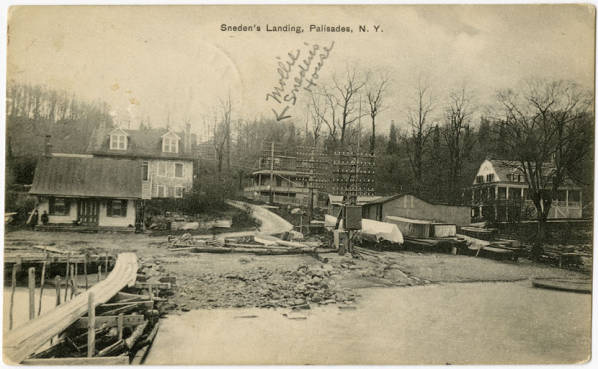
Old postcard showing Sneden's landing with Mollie Sneden's house indicated. By permission of Palisades Free Library

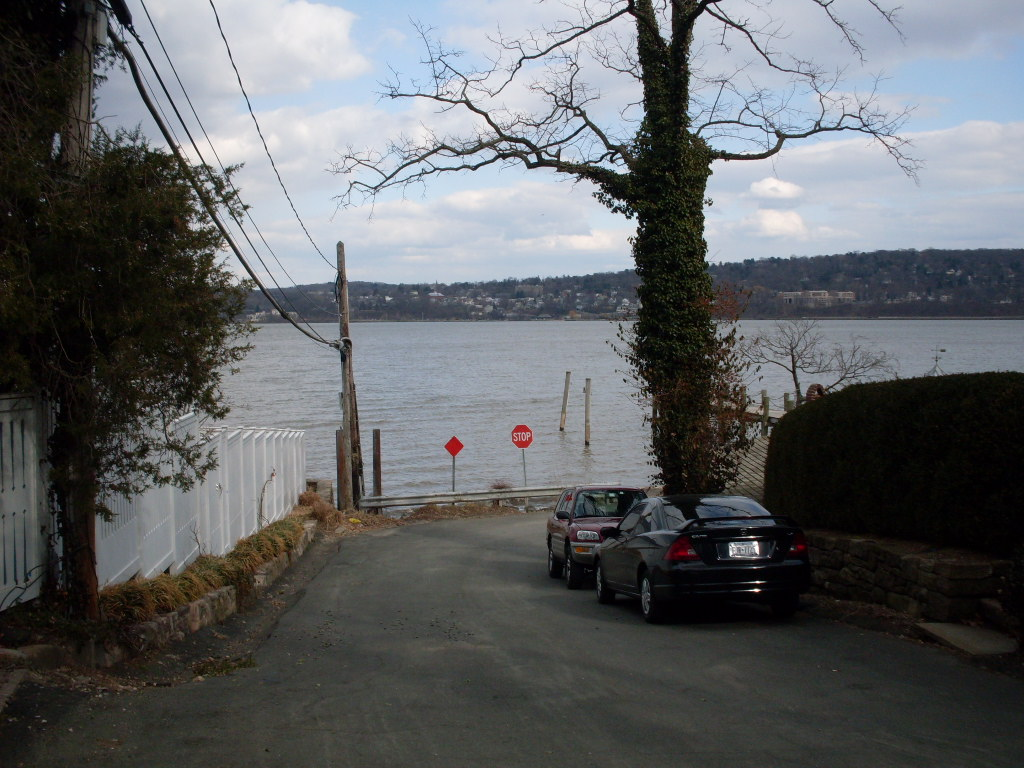
Sneden's Landing today from opposite direction.

Mollie and Robert moved directly across the Hudson from Dobbs Ferry with their five children in about 1740, where it is believed they rented from a local land-owner named Robert Corbett. Their new home was on land which was claimed by both New York and New Jersey. The dispute was not legally settled for nearly 30 years, when a commission appointed by the King of England set the border officially in 1769. The surveyor's description measures the state line as 79 chains and 27 links south of the Sneden house, placing their property in New York. Although this was new property for the Snedens, both Mollie and Robert would have known it well as the landing site of the Dobbs's ferry. While living on the west side of the Hudson, Mollie and Robert had four more children, the last born in 1750. This brought the total number of their children to nine.

After their move in 1740 Robert worked at his farming profession, and Mollie relieved his burden of labor by operating the ferry landing. She may have run a ferry as early as 1745. A surveyor's map from that year illustrating the larger area known as the Lockhart Patent shows "Sneedings house the fferry [sic]." The ferry received a boost when an improved road was built down the hilly terrain to the landing in 1745. Whether or not she began as ferry mistress in 1745, Mollie Sneden was certainly acting in that capacity by 1753.

The original Dobbs ferry was said to be a periauger, a row-and-sail dugout, sometimes with two masts. Mollie Sneden would have known this, and she probably began her ferry with periaugers. They were popular colonial craft capable of negotiating shallow water while carrying heavy loads. Vessels of this variety were typically used in early ferry operations on the Hudson, and several miles downriver by Fort Lee, Stephen Bourdette began his ferry service using one. In addition to periaugers, Mollie Sneden would have used larger craft; for she ferried wagons as well as people. A larger type of ferry used on the Hudson during this period was powered by a paddle wheel, which in turn was rotated by horses or mules on a treadmill. She definitely would have required a larger vessel for a crossing she is said to have made in 1775 carrying a coach. It bore Martha Washington and her son, John, complete with his wife, liveried footmen and postillon, when Martha was en route to visit George Washington in Cambridge, Massachusetts. The Hudson River is relatively wide between Sneden's Landing and Dobbs Ferry, and a crossing varied in duration. The length of time was affected by variable winds and the tides, which are still strong only a few miles above New York Harbor. Not only did the Sneden ferry cross the Hudson River, it also transported goods southward to New York City.

Robert and Mollie purchased 120 acres (0.49 km^{2}) in 1752, which included the ferry site and Corbett house. Robert died in 1756 at the age of 46, and the eldest son, Abraham, inherited all of his property, in accordance with English law. In that same year, the widow Mollie Sneden was granted a license to operate a tavern. The Ferry continued with other Dobbs Family members at the helm, with the help of her seven sons in 1758 or 1759. Although Dobb's Ferry had always used this landing as the western terminus of its ferry service, until now it had been called different names: sometimes simply "the ferry," sometimes Paramus or Rockland, and occasionally Dobbs Ferry on both sides of the river. From this period the landing took the name Sneden's Landing. Thus, Dobbs Ferry took the Family name and Sneden's Landing took Mollies married name. Through the 1800s Sneden's Landing remained the center for riparian activities for the local region, which is called Palisades today.

Mollie had been licensed to operate a tavern in 1756, and in 1763 she received a license to operate a public house serving "strong Liquors" which she operated from "Stone House," her dwelling. Two years later a marriage license was granted to Mollie Sneden and George Calhoun. It is not clear if Mollie actually carried out the marriage license by marrying George Calhoun. She is noted as living with her bachelor son, Dennis, but never with George Calhoun. In 1765, her first son, Abraham, distributed his father's property in ten equal segments, one portion going to his mother.

== A Tory during the Revolutionary War ==
With the outbreak of the Revolutionary War, communities were split by political factions. Except for Mollie and Robert's son John, nicknamed "The Patriot," the Snedens were branded as Tories, or British sympathizers. All but John were forbidden to operate the ferry during the war. It has been suggested by the historian Howard Durie that they were, in fact, all Tories. According to this suggestion, the Snedens avoided having their land confiscated by having one family member espouse patriotism. Such an action would also have allowed the ferry to remain operational and in Sneden control.

A story credits Mollie Sneden with saving a British soldier during this period:

The story goes that a British soldier was pursued down the gully by some patriots; she hid him in her house in a large chest on which she set pans of cream to rise, and when the patriots arrived she misinformed them; they were tired and asked for refreshment, and she offered them all the milk she had, but told them not to disturb the pans of cream which she had just set out. In the evening she is said to have ferried the soldier across the river.

Through proximity and possible communication with Dobbs Ferry, Mollie Sneden would have been aware of the tremendous activity of 6,000 men across the river, when General Cornwallis prepared to embark on a night crossing of the Hudson in late November 1776. The British and Hessians, commanded by Cornwallis, were ferried in row galleys and landing craft from Dobbs Ferry, New York to Closter, New Jersey, closing in on George Washington and the badly outnumbered Continental Army. After this experience, heady for British sympathizers, she would have known in 1781 through gossip and John's ferry connection that General George Washington had established headquarters in Dobbs Ferry. Here he was to plan with Marshal Rochambeau the Yorktown campaign which would bring the Revolutionary War to an end. After the British surrendered, at the nadir of Tory experience, she would have witnessed the first naval 17 gun salute to General Washington fired from the British Warship, H.M.S. Perseverance, which was anchored offshore in the Hudson River.

== After the Revolutionary War ==
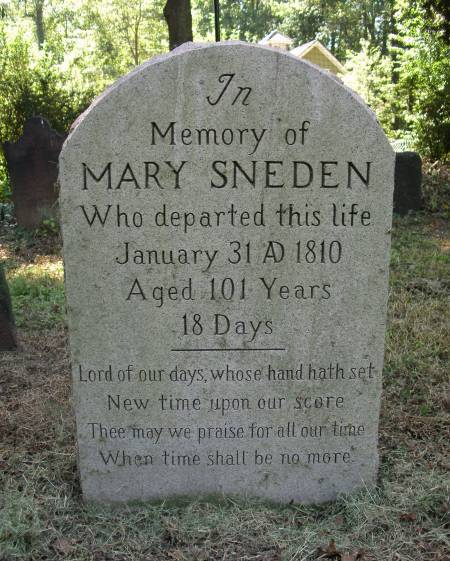
Molly Sneden's grave marker

Mollie left Sneden's Landing after the war ended. With her bachelor son, Dennis, she moved to New York City, leaving operation of the ferry to John, "The Patriot." Other sons moved to the British colonies of Nova Scotia and New Brunswick. In about 1788, when she would have been 79, Mollie returned with Dennis to Sneden's Landing and took up residence in a house adjacent to the landing known as the "Mollie Sneden House," 14 Washington Spring Road. She resumed involvement with the ferry and continued to work in this connection until shortly before her death. Mollie Sneden died on January 31, 1810, at the age of 101 years and 18 days, surviving her husband by 66 years.

She is buried in the Palisades Cemetery, also known as the Sneden's Landing Cemetery, in Palisades, New York. Her original grave marker was replaced in 1982 by the local historical society because it had crumbled and become illegible.
