= Arthur Gilman (educator) =

United States writer and educator

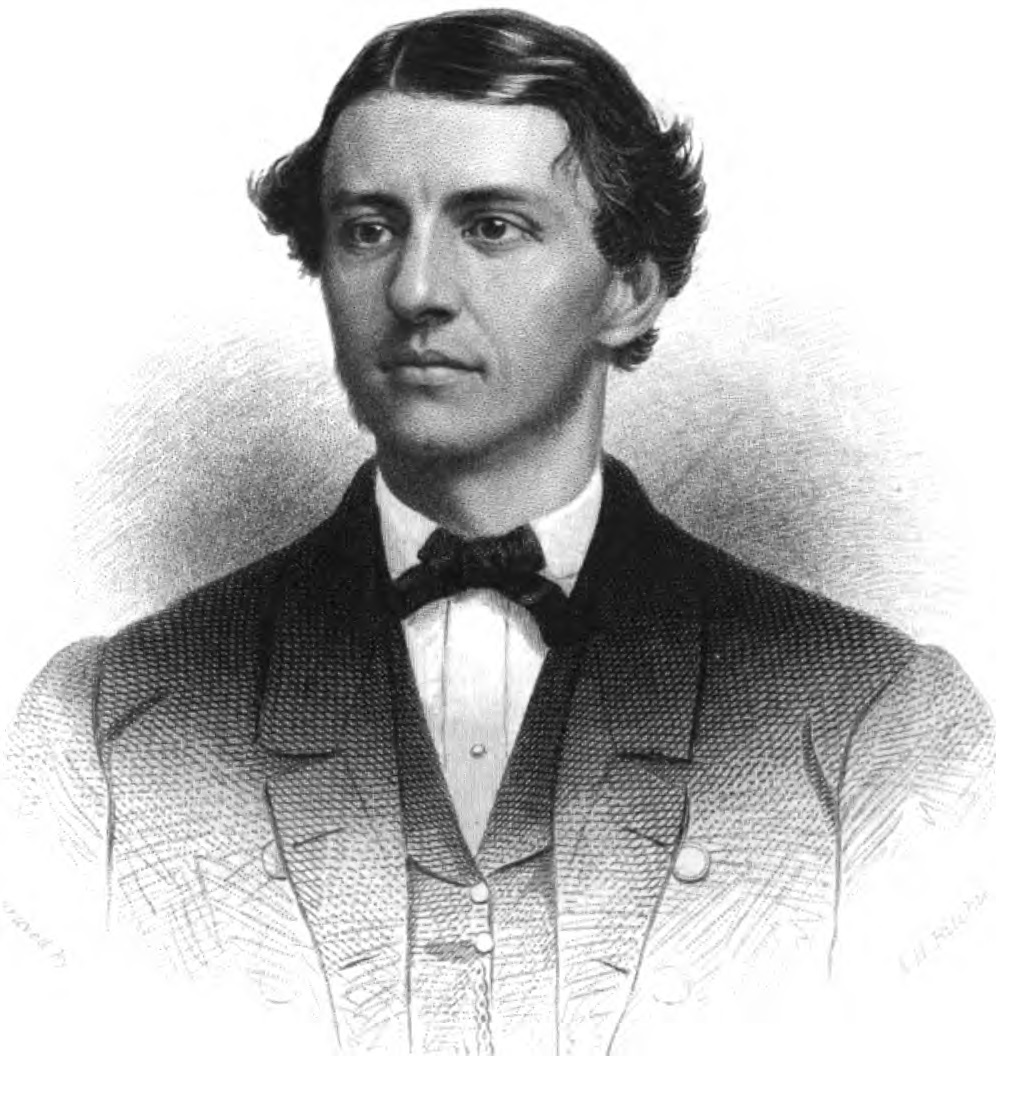
- Born: June 22, 1837; Alton, Illinois, U.S.
- Died: December 27, 1909 (aged 72); Atlantic City, New Jersey, U.S.
- Spouse: Stella Scott

Signature
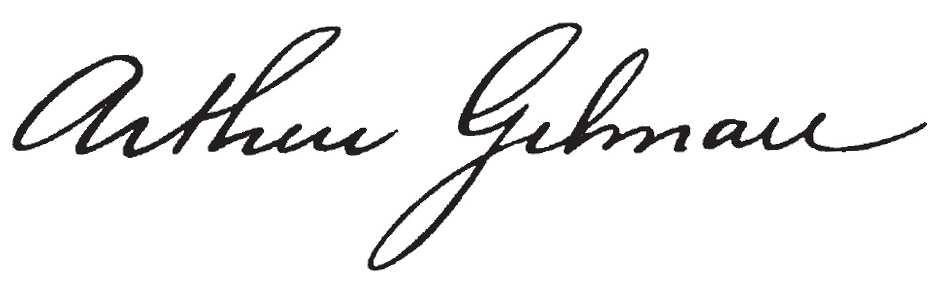

Arthur Gilman (June 22, 1837 – December 27, 1909 Atlantic City, New Jersey) was an American educator and philanthropist. He and his second wife founded the women's institution in Cambridge, Massachusetts in association with Harvard University. It eventually developed as Radcliffe College.

== Biography ==
He was a son of banker Winthrop Sargent Gilman and his wife Abia Swift Lippincott Gilman. His immigrant ancestor Edward Gilman, of Welsh ancestry, emigrated from Norfolk, England, to Boston, Massachusetts, in 1638. His father's wealth (made in the wholesale grocery trade) paid for Arthur Gilman's education in private schools in St. Louis, Missouri, and Lee, Massachusetts. Beginning in 1849, he attended the coeducational Chrestomathic Institute of Rye, New York. In 1851 he moved to a school in New York City, where he studied until 1853.

He joined his father's New York City banking firm, working there from 1857 to 1862. His health becoming impaired, Gilman retired and moved to Lenox, Massachusetts (Dictionary of American Biography reports Lee, Massachusetts; American National Biography confirms Lenox). There he devoted himself to literary, historical, and educational work.

In 1870, he moved to Cambridge, and became associated with the Riverside Press. In 1871, he became one of the editors of the American Tract Society in Boston. Concerned for their daughter's education, in 1879 he and his second wife, Stella Scott Gilman (originally from Alabama), founded Private Collegiate Instruction for Women (familiarly known as the Harvard Annex), of which he became executive officer. The new school, which employed Harvard professors part-time, was organized so that women could enjoy instruction equal in quality to the instruction that Harvard men received.

In 1882 the school became known as the Society for the Collegiate Instruction for Women. In 1894 it was reorganized as Radcliffe College, for which Gilman was regent until 1895. In 1886, he founded and became director of the Cambridge School for Girls (now The Cambridge School of Weston). Most of his studies were in the fields of English literature and history.

== Works ==
He published Genealogy of the Gilman Family in England and America in 1864; The Gilman Family traced in the Line of Hon. John Gilman, of Exeter, N. H. came out in 1869 (Albany, New York). He edited Chaucer's works (The Poetical Works of Geoffrey Chaucer, to which are appended poems attributed to Chaucer; 3 vols., Boston and London, 1879) and other collections, collaborated in several volumes of the “Stories of the Nations” series, and wrote a number of educational works, chiefly historical in character, including:

- First Steps in English Literature (Boston, 1870)
- Kings, Queens, and Barbarians, or Talks about Seven Historic Ages (1870)
- First Steps in General History: A Suggestive Outline (1874)
- Shakespeare's Morals, with brief collateral readings and Scriptural references (New York, 1879)
- History of the American People (Boston, 1883)
- Tales of the Pathfinders (1884)
- The Story of Rome (New York and London, 1885)
- Short Stories from the Dictionary (Boston, 1886)
- Story of the Saracens (New York and London, 1886)
- The Colonization of America (1887)

He edited and contributed to:

- Boston, Past and Present (Boston, 1873)
- Library of Religious Poetry (New York and London, 1880)
- The Kingdom of Home; Homely Poems for Home Lovers (Boston, 1881)
- Magna Charta Stories (Boston and London, 1882)
- Index to the Complete Edition of the Works of Samuel Taylor Coleridge (New York, 1884)

Stella Scott Gilman is the author of Mothers in Council (New York, 1884).
