= Abner Concklin House =

Historic house in New York, United States

- U.S. National Register of Historic Places
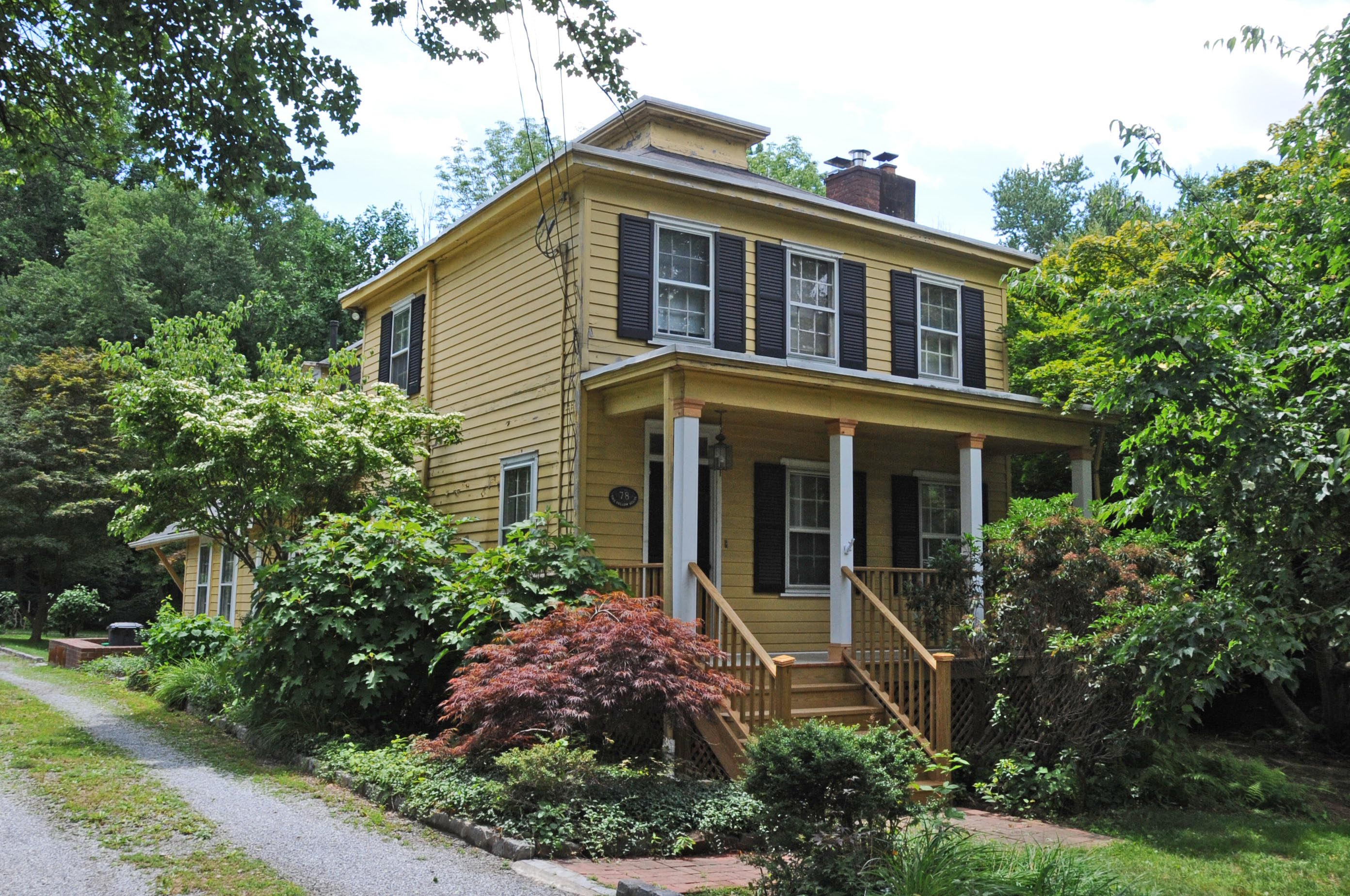

- Location within New York Location within the United States
- Location: Closter Rd., Palisades, New York
- Coordinates: 41°0′26″N 73°55′14″W
- Area: 1 acre (0.40 ha)
- Built: 1859
- Architect: Abner Concklin
- NRHP reference No.: 87001358
- Added to NRHP: August 6, 1987

The Abner Concklin House (also known as Old Yellow House) is a historic house located at Closter Road in Palisades, Rockland County, New York.

== Description and history ==
It was built in about 1859, and is a small, two-story frame residence, three bays wide, with later rear wings and alterations dating to about 1920. It features a hipped roof with a monitor-like cap at the apex. Also on the property are a garage and shed.

It was listed on the National Register of Historic Places on August 6, 1987.
