= St. Paul's United Methodist Church (Nyack, New York) =

Historic church in New York, United States

- U.S. National Register of Historic Places
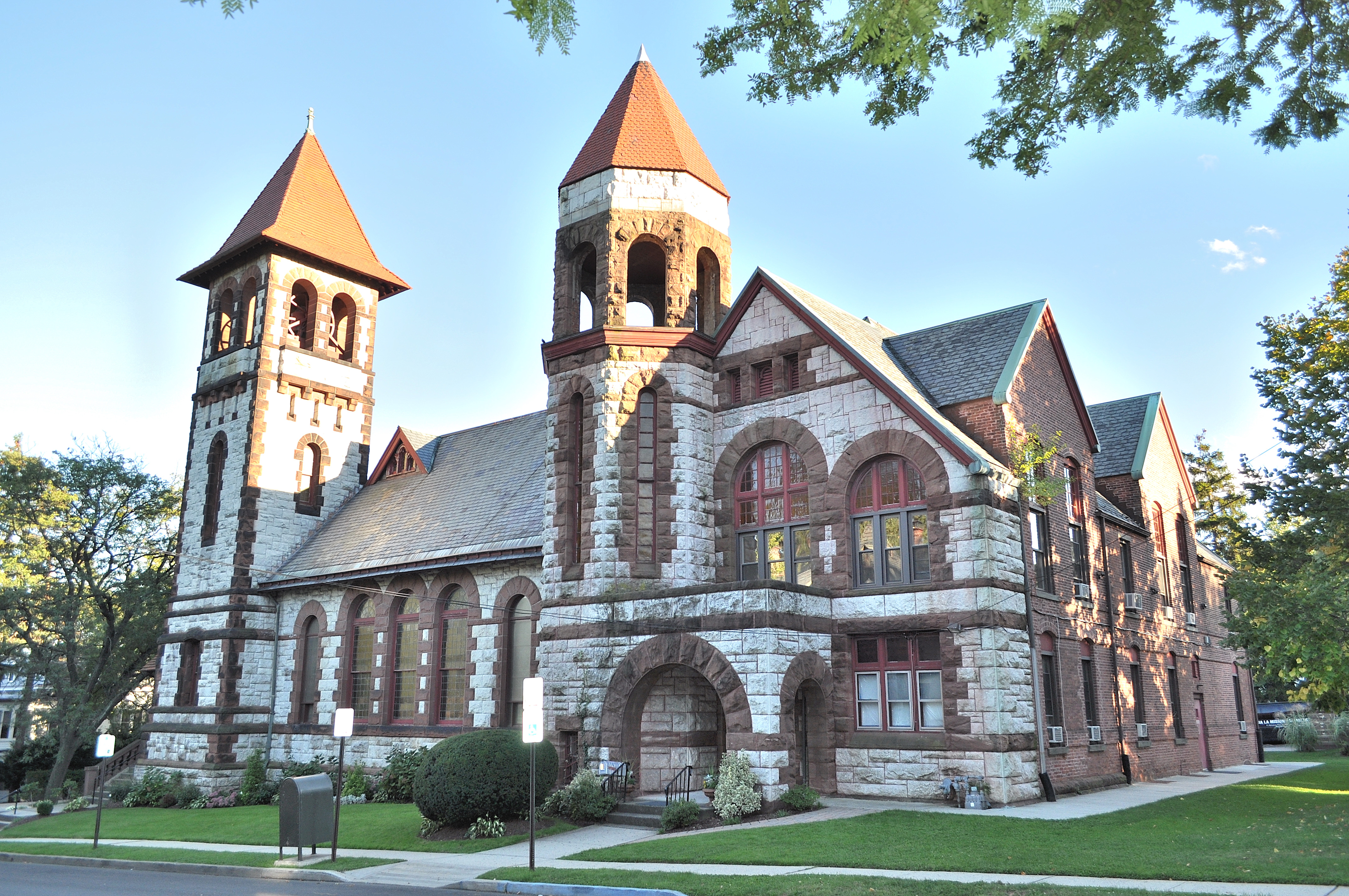

- Location within New York Location within the United States
- Location: S. Broadway and Division St., Nyack, New York
- Coordinates: 41°5′10″N 73°55′11″W
- Area: less than one acre
- Built: 1894
- Architect: Emery, Marshall L. & Emery
- Architectural style: Romanesque
- NRHP reference No.: 01000251
- Added to NRHP: March 12, 2001

St. Paul's United Methodist Church is a historic United Methodist church in Nyack, Rockland County, New York. It is a Romanesque church built in two sections over a 17-year period starting in 1894. It is constructed of rusticated limestone with brownstone trim.

It was listed on the National Register of Historic Places in 2001.
