= Haring-Eberle House =

Historic house in New York, United States

- U.S. National Register of Historic Places
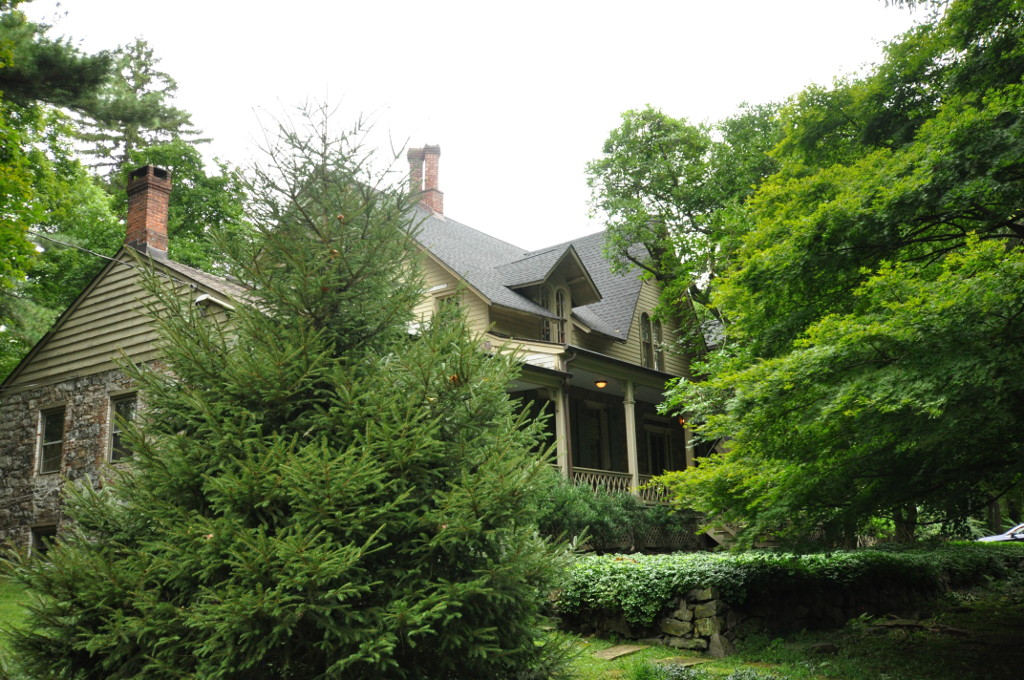

- Location within New York Location within the United States
- Location: US 9W N of Oak Tree Rd., Palisades, New York
- Coordinates: 41°0′43″N 73°54′45″W
- Area: 2.4 acres (0.97 ha)
- Built: 1865
- Architectural style: Gothic Revival
- MPS: Palisades MPS
- NRHP reference No.: 90001010
- Added to NRHP: July 12, 1990

Haring-Eberle House is a historic home located at Palisades in Rockland County, New York. It took its present form about 1865 and is a distinctive example of Gothic Revival style residential design. Also on the property is a carriage house.

It was listed on the National Register of Historic Places in 1990.
