= Neiderhurst =

Historic house in New York, United States

- Niederhurst
- U.S. National Register of Historic Places
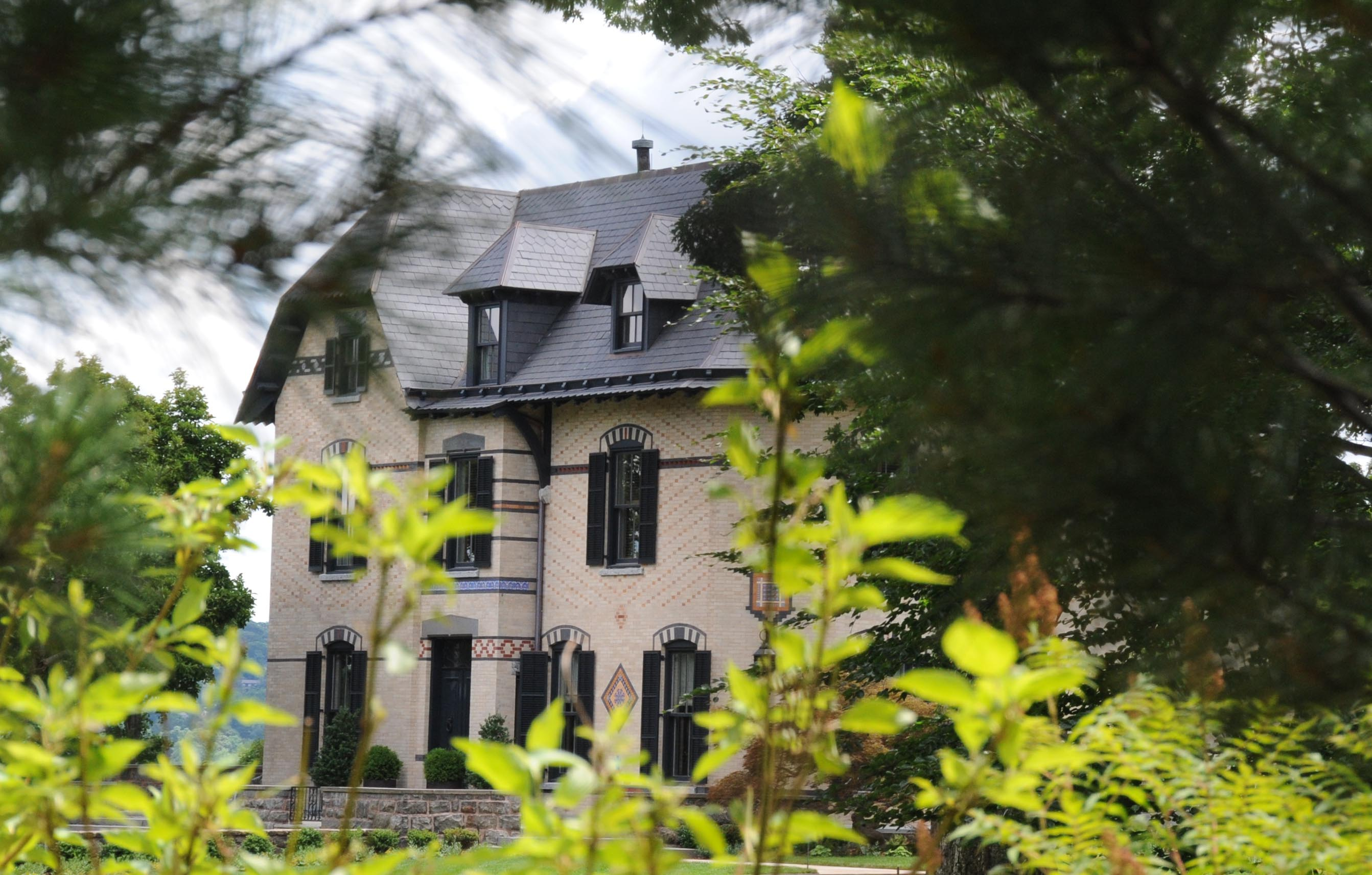

- Location within New York Location within the United States
- Location: Ludlow Ln. S of River Rd., Palisades, New York
- Coordinates: 41°0′35″N 73°54′29″W
- Area: 14 acres (5.7 ha)
- Built: 1866
- Architect: Gilman, Winthrop S., Jr.
- Architectural style: Gothic, Gothic Revival, High Victorian Gothic
- MPS: Palisades MPS
- NRHP reference No.: 90001011
- Added to NRHP: July 12, 1990

Neiderhurst is a historic estate located at Palisades in Rockland County, New York. The main estate house was built as a summer home between 1872 and 1874 in the High Victorian Gothic style. It is a two-story, L-shaped residence surmounted by steep gable roofs. It was built by Winthrop S. Gilman Jr. (1839–1923), son of Winthrop Sargent Gilman (1808–1884). Also on the property are a small observatory converted to a cote; Fern Lodge, built 1866, a residential outbuilding that was formerly the stables; a barn converted to residential use; a concrete pergola; and stone shed. The estate grounds retain a park-like quality.

It was listed on the National Register of Historic Places in 1990.
