= Skunk Hollow =

Settlement of free slaves in New Jersey, USA (fl. 1860–1910)

Skunk Hollow was a community of free African Americans that existed about a mile south of Alpine, New Jersey near the Palisades Highway. It was also known by its inhabitants as "The Mountain".

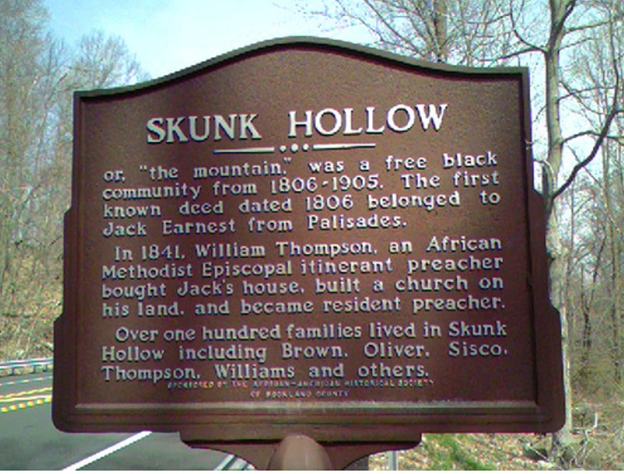
Skunk Hollow marker

On or about January 1, 1806 was the first cited deed to a property in Skunk Hollow was purchased by a Jack Earnest for $87.50 (~$1,801 in 2025) for five acres and 30 square rods. In 1822 Earnest purchased another six acres.

The settlers of Skunk Hollow appear to be free African-Americans who settled as early as 1854, on land that may have been acquired in 1840 by a freed slave named James Oliver.

William Thomson, a minister (known as "reverend Billy"), the spiritual leader of the settlement, organized a church in Skunk Hollow that was built between 1856 and 1860. By 1880 Skunk Hollow had a population of 75 people, according to census records, only to drop to six households of 26 people by 1885. The settlement was largely abandoned by 1886 after Reverend Billy's death. In 1903 it was incorporated in the Borough of Alpine, New Jersey.

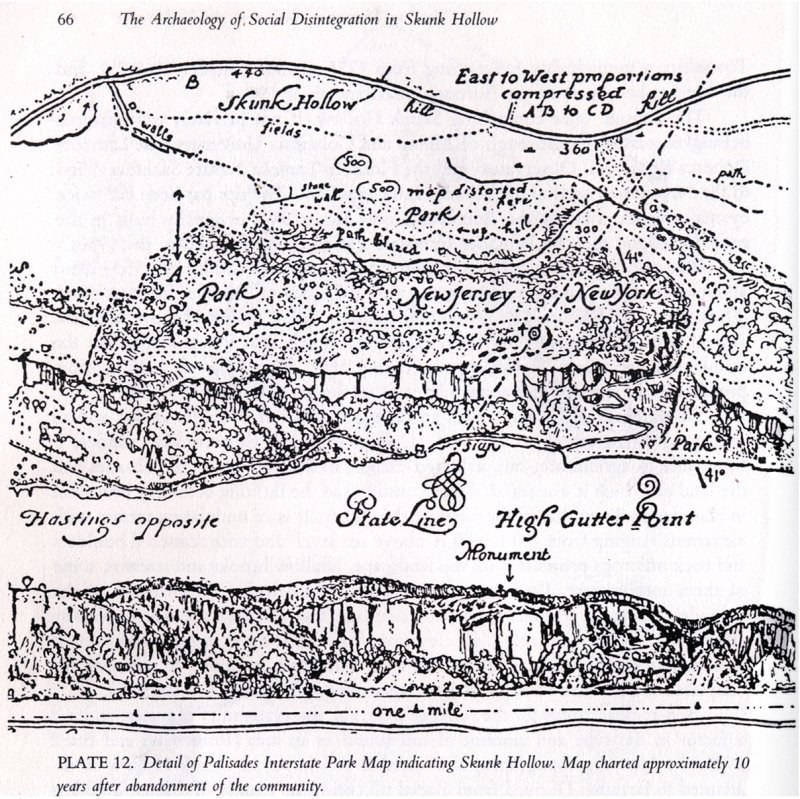
Palisades Park map, 1921

While the settlement was largely abandoned by 1911, other sections of The Mountain were occupied as late as 1979.

In the 2000s, researcher Joan Geismar, a graduate student at Columbia University working on her doctorate, researched Skunk Hollow. The research included an archeological dig. According to the research, the settlement of Skunk Hollow moved to nearby towns in the early 1900 after the death of Rev. William Thompson around 1885.

The name Skunk Hollow is thought to originate from the aroma of skunk cabbage which commonly grows in saturated soil in the area. Bruised foliage of the plant has an aroma nearly identical to that of a skunk. The area was also called "Turkey Ridge" by some locals on the New York side.
