= Closter Road–Oak Tree Road Historic District =

Historic house in New York, United States

- U.S. National Register of Historic Places
- U.S. Historic district
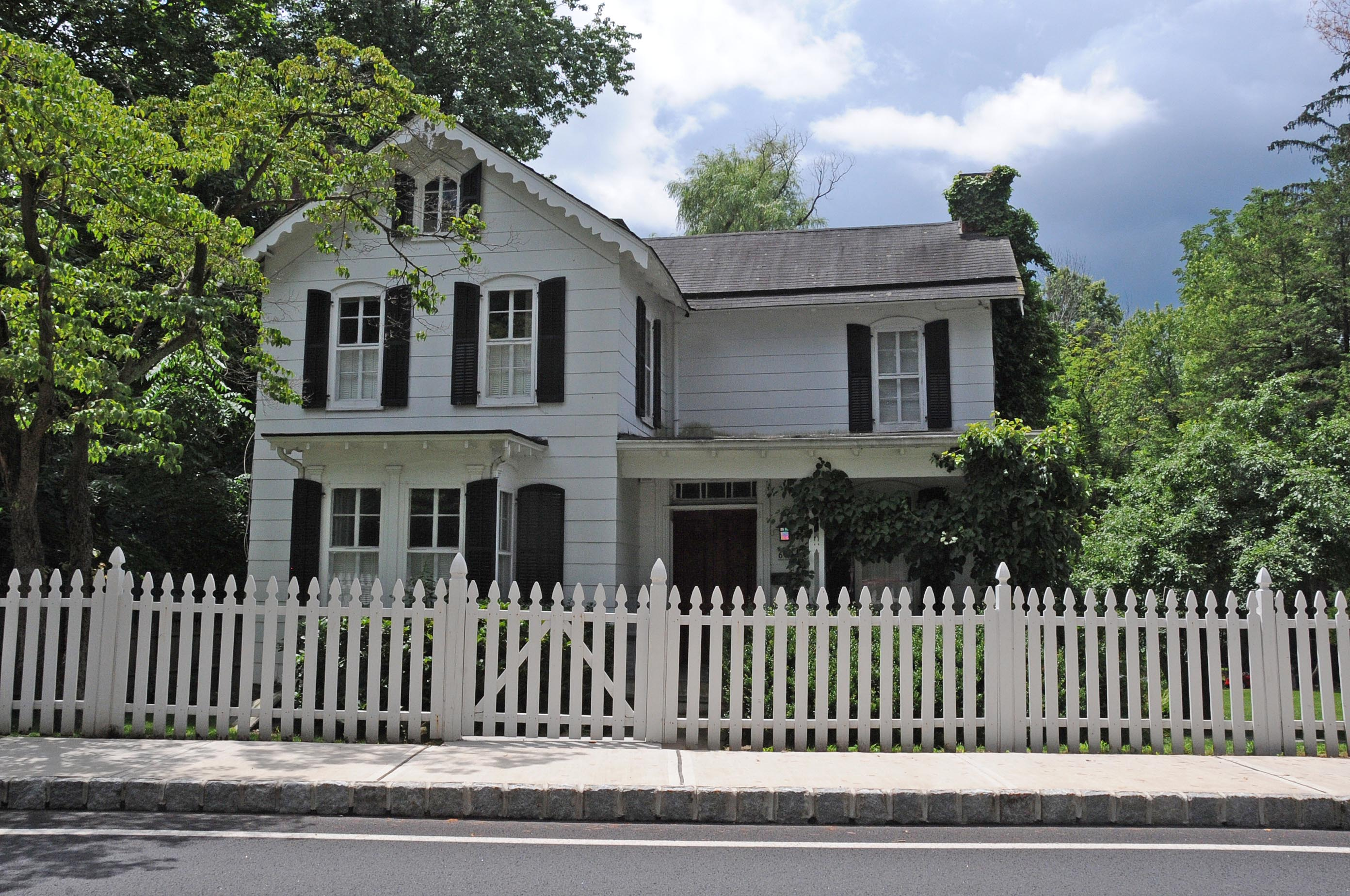

- Location within New York Location within the United States
- Location: Roughly, N side of Closter Rd. and S side of Oak Tree Rd. approx. 1/2 mi. W of US 9W, Palisades, New York
- Coordinates: 41°0′43″N 73°55′3″W
- Area: 10.5 acres (4.2 ha)
- Built: 1774
- Architectural style: Greek Revival, Italianate, Gothic Revival
- MPS: Palisades MPS
- NRHP reference No.: 90001014
- Added to NRHP: July 12, 1990

Closter Road–Oak Tree Road Historic District is a national historic district located at Palisades in Rockland County, New York. It encompasses 18 contributing buildings and one contributing site. The district consists of 19 properties that reflect the historic core of the hamlet. It contains residential, commercial, religious, and civic properties of architectural and historic significance dating from the closing years of the 18th century to the first decade of the 20th.

It was listed on the National Register of Historic Places in 1990.
