= Little House (Palisades, New York) =

Historic house in New York, United States

- U.S. National Register of Historic Places
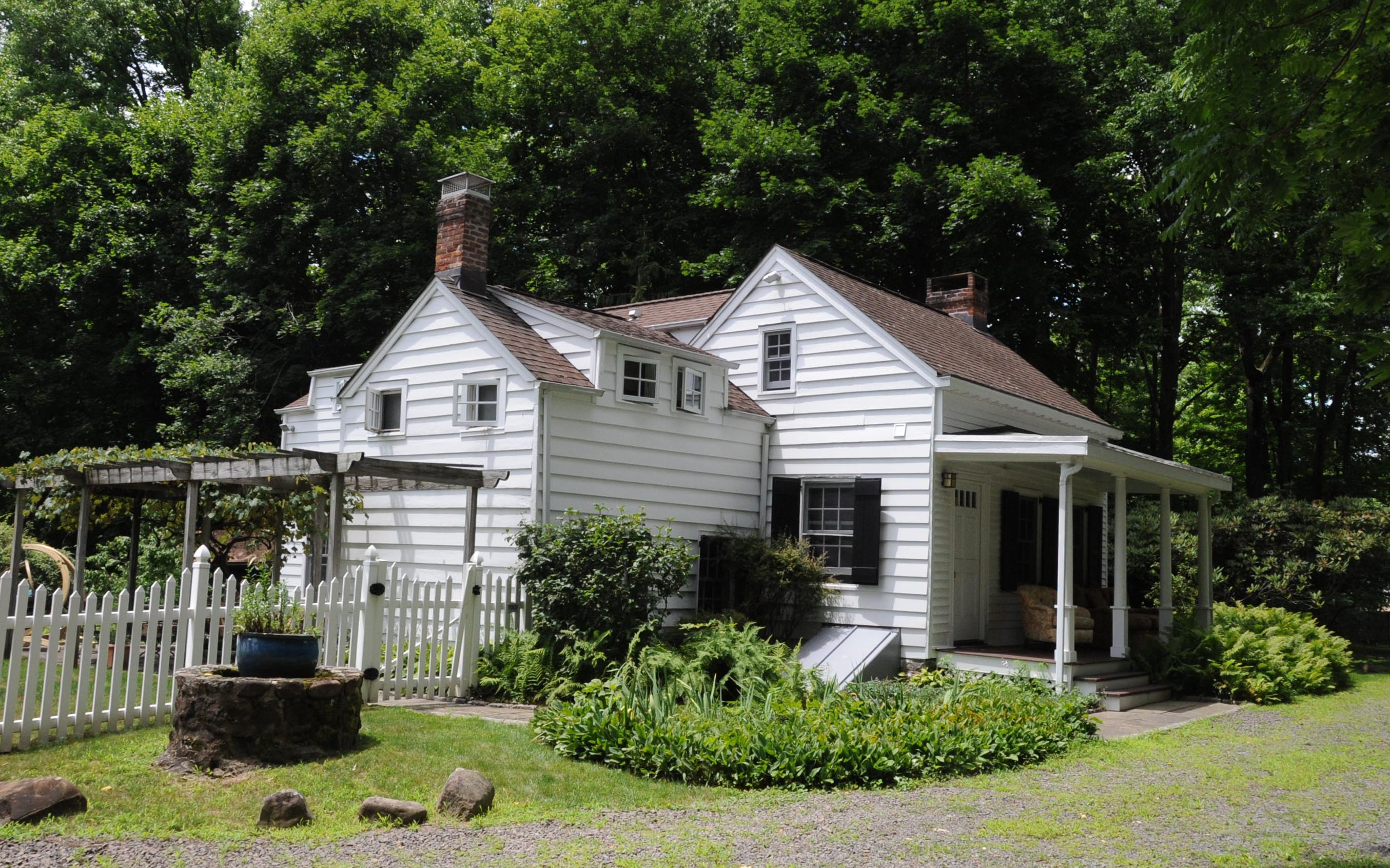

- Location within New York Location within the United States
- Location: US 9W N of Oak Tree Rd., Palisades, New York
- Coordinates: 41°0′43″N 73°54′45″W
- Area: 1.7 acres (0.69 ha)
- Built: 1824
- Architectural style: Federal
- MPS: Palisades MPS
- NRHP reference No.: 90001009
- Added to NRHP: July 12, 1990

Little House is a historic home located at Palisades in Rockland County, New York. It was built in 1824 is a 1 1/2-story, three-bay, side-passage frame residence in the Federal style. Also on the property are two late-19th-century sheds.

It was listed on the National Register of Historic Places in 1990.
