= Lozier House and Van Riper Mill =

Historic house in New Jersey, United States

- U.S. National Register of Historic Places
- New Jersey Register of Historic Places
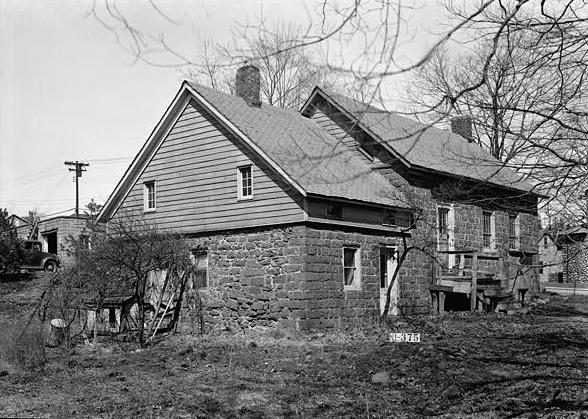
- The Lozier House

- Location within Bergen County, New Jersey Location within New Jersey Location within the United States
- Location: 34 Goffle Road and 11 Paterson Avenue, Midland Park, New Jersey
- Coordinates: 40°59′3″N 74°8′28″W
- Area: 7 acres (2.8 ha)
- Built: 1775
- Architectural style: Colonial, Dutch Colonial
- NRHP reference No.: 75001119
- NJRHP No.: 576

Significant dates
- Added to NRHP: October 10, 1975
- Designated NJRHP: September 6, 1973

The Lozier House and Van Riper Mill are located in Midland Park, Bergen County, New Jersey, United States. The house and mill were jointly added to the National Register of Historic Places on October 10, 1975.

== See also ==
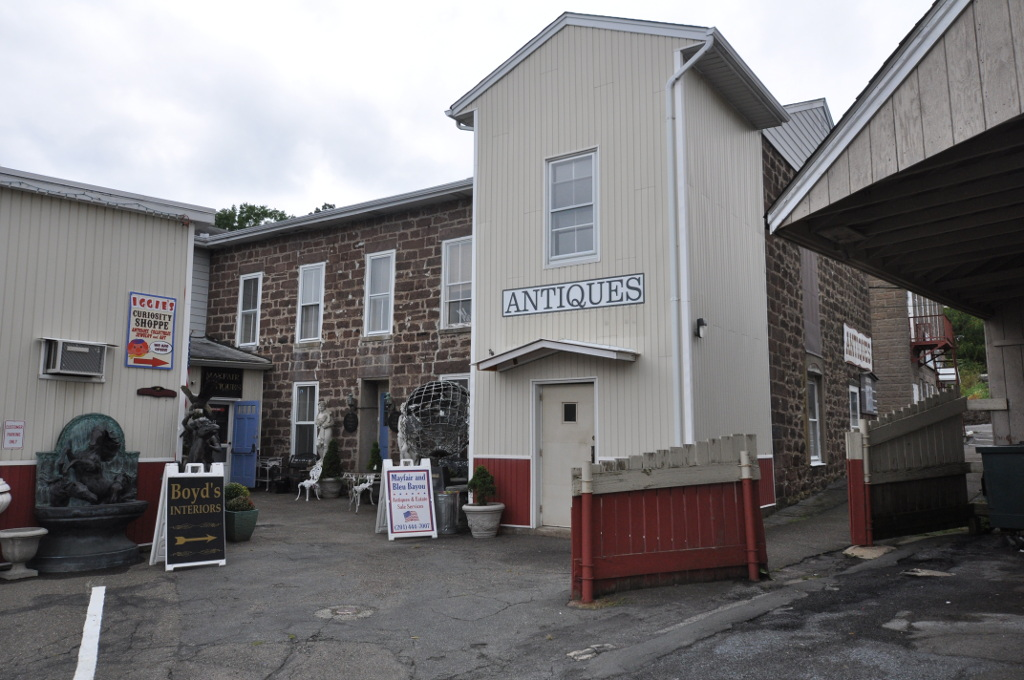
The mill in 2019

- National Register of Historic Places listings in Bergen County, New Jersey
