= Washington Spring Road–Woods Road Historic District =

Historic district in New York, United States

- U.S. National Register of Historic Places
- U.S. Historic district
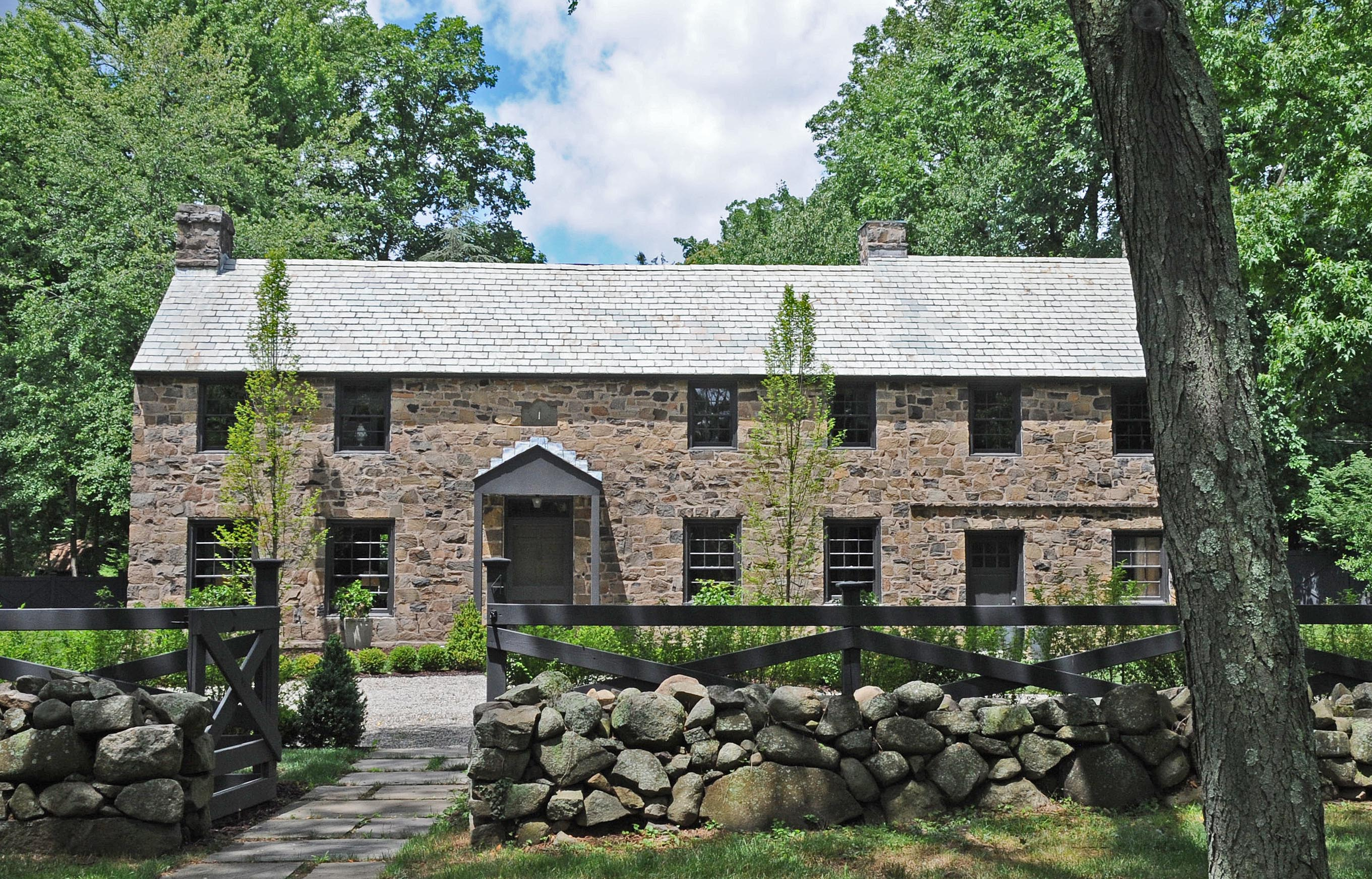

- Location within New York Location within the United States
- Location: Roughly, area along Washington Spring Rd. from Highland Ave. to Hudson R. and N approx. 1/2 mi. along Woods Rd., Palisades, New York
- Coordinates: 41°0′42″N 73°54′26″W
- Area: 40.9 acres (16.6 ha)
- Built: 1750
- Architectural style: Bungalow/Craftsman, Greek Revival, Gothic Revival
- MPS: Palisades MPS
- NRHP reference No.: 90001015
- Added to NRHP: July 12, 1990

Washington Spring Road–Woods Road Historic District is a national historic district located at Palisades in Rockland County, New York. It encompasses 36 contributing buildings located in a narrow valley to the west of the hamlet. It contains residential and religious properties of architectural and historic significance dating from the 18th century to the first third of the 20th.

It was listed on the National Register of Historic Places in 1990.
