= Cliffside (Palisades, New York) =

Historic house in New York, United States

- U.S. National Register of Historic Places
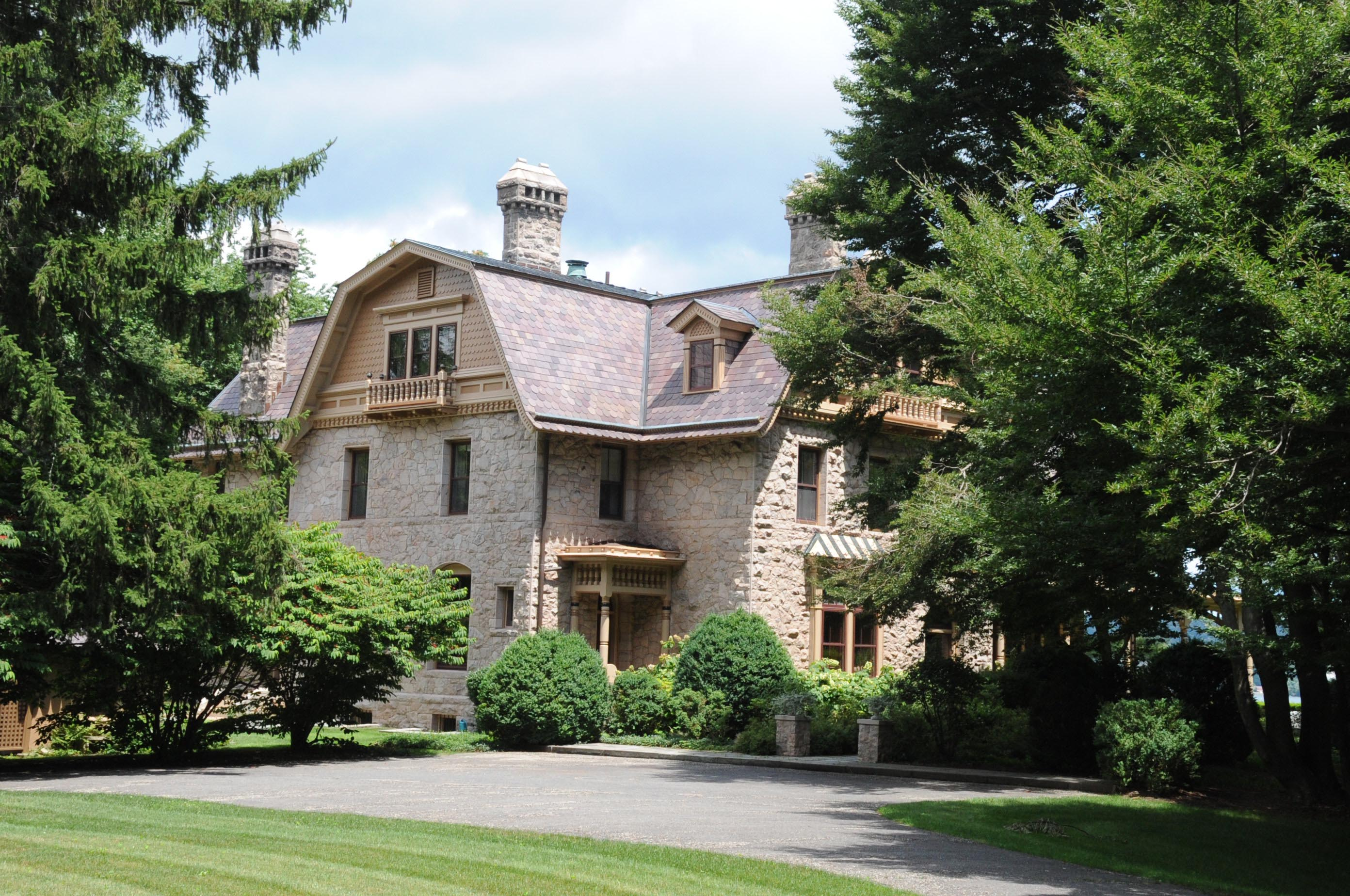

- Location within New York Location within the United States
- Location: Lawrence Ln. S of River Rd., Palisades, New York
- Coordinates: 41°0′28″N 73°54′14″W
- Area: 4 acres (1.6 ha)
- Built: 1876
- Architect: Cady, J. Cleveland
- Architectural style: Flemish Colonial Revival
- MPS: Palisades MPS
- NRHP reference No.: 90001012
- Added to NRHP: July 12, 1990

Cliffside, also known as H. E. Lawrence Estate, is a historic home located at Palisades, Rockland County, New York. It was designed by J. Cleveland Cady and was built in 1876. The estate house is a two-story, L-shaped, Flemish Colonial Revival style stone dwelling. It features a steep cross-gambrel roof and a one-story wraparound verandah. Also on the property is a contributing carriage house.

It was listed on the National Register of Historic Places in 1990.
