= Henry Garner Mansion =

- Garner, Henry, Mansion
- Formerly listed on the U.S. National Register of Historic Places
- Location within New York Location within the United States
- Location: 18 Railroad Ave., West Haverstraw, New York
- Coordinates: 41°12′35″N 73°59′18″W
- Area: 0.7 acres (0.28 ha)
- Built: ca. 1845, 1907
- Architect: Alexander Jackson Davis
- Architectural style: Greek Revival
- NRHP reference No.: 73001262

Significant dates
- Added to NRHP: August 14, 1973
- Removed from NRHP: April 24, 1979

The Henry Garner Mansion, also known as the Garner-Scott-Hornbaker House, was a historic home located at West Haverstraw, New York, overlooking the Hudson River. It was built about 1845, possibly based on plans by noted architect Alexander Jackson Davis. It was an imposing two-story, Greek Revival style structure, with a rear kitchen-servant wing added in 1907. The front facade featured corinthian columns and an octagonal two story tower topped with an octagonal belvedere.

It was added to the National Register of Historic Places in 1973, and delisted in 1979, after being demolished in 1976.
