= Palisades, New York =

Hamlet in New York, United States

- Hamlet
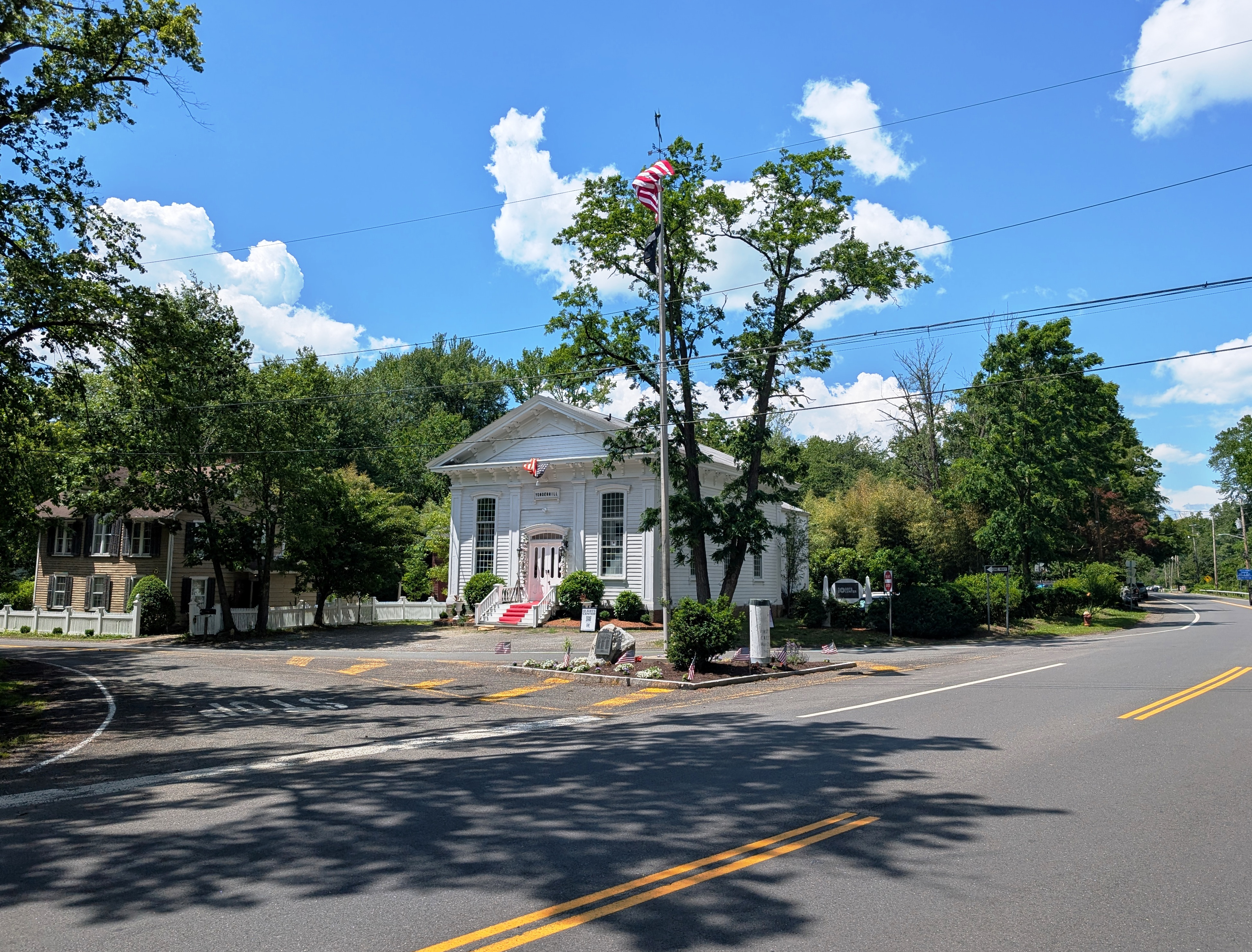
- IO Arts Center in Palisades

- Location within New York Location within the United States
- Coordinates: 41.0112085°N 73.9134694°W
- Country: United States
- State: New York
- County: Rockland
- Town: Orangetown

Area
  - Land: 24.2 sq mi (63 km^{2})
  - Water: 7.2 sq mi (19 km^{2})
- Elevation: 194 ft (59 m)

Population (2020)
  - Total: 1,317
- Time zone: UTC−5 (Eastern (EST))
  - Summer (DST): UTC−4 (EDT)
- ZIP Code: 10964
- Area code: 845
- GNIS feature ID: 959775

Palisades is an unincorporated hamlet in the town of Orangetown in Rockland County, New York, United States.

The area referred to as Snedens Landing is located in the eastern portion of Palisades and goes down to the Hudson River.

The hamlet has a registered historic district known as the Closter Road–Oak Tree Road Historic District.

== History ==
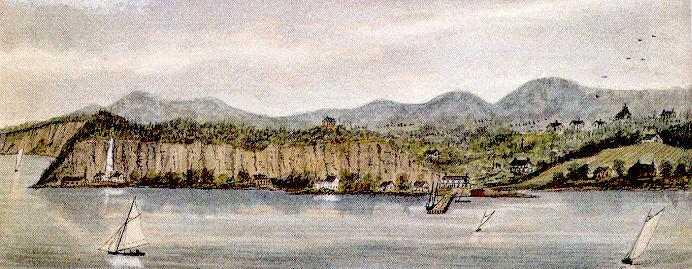
Snedens Landing by Robert Knox Sneden, 1858

=== 17th and 18th centuries ===
In 1685 Dr. George Lockhart purchased 3,410 acres along the west bank of the Hudson River which would become Palisades, NY. In the ensuing 20 years the land would change hands twice. By 1702 there were two houses with 14 people, eight of them enslaved. During this period the land was claimed by both New York and New Jersey. A king's commission settled the dispute in 1769 by drawing an official border between the two states. It placed Palisades just inside of New York.

=== Revolutionary War ===
The Palisades vicinity saw considerable activity during the Revolutionary War. Loyalties were split more than normally in such a conflict, because the area marked the dividing line between American and British combatants. This situation is demonstrated within the family of Mollie Sneden, a legendary resident whose family name was given to Snedens Landing, as Palisades was known at that time. She and most of her sons were Tories, but her son John was a Patriot. He was allowed to keep the family ferry operating across the Hudson River to Dobbs Ferry during the Revolution. An action by Mollie Sneden during this period illustrates the close interaction of British and patriots in this vicinity.

The story goes that a British soldier was pursued down the gully by some patriots; she hid him in her house in a large chest on which she set pans of cream to rise, and when the patriots arrived she misinformed them; they were tired and asked for refreshment, and she offered them all the milk she had, but told them not to disturb the pans of cream which she had just set out. In the evening she is said to have ferried the soldier across the river.

The British General Cornwallis crossed the Hudson with 6,000 men in November 1776 from Dobbs Ferry and forced the evacuation of Fort Lee. His natural disembarkation would have been Snedens Landing, directly across the river; but a force of 500 patriots armed with four cannon and a howitzer at Snedens Landing caused the British to reroute their crossing to Closter, farther south. In 1780 George Washington ordered a blockhouse to be built at Snedens Landing to serve as a guard for the ferry service, an intelligence center and a means of communication. The General is known to have passed through the area and visited the blockhouse a number of times, and the road descending to the site of the ferry is named Washington Springs Road. According to tradition Washington and his troops used a small spring bordering this thoroughfare as source of refreshment. This vicinity is also associated with Benedict Arnold, who was seen by an American soldier lurking in the woods during the period he was attempting to betray West Point. He is also known to have spent a day at the blockhouse avoiding patrol boats along the Hudson.

Across the river at Dobbs Ferry, General Washington planned a campaign with Marshal Rochambeau to bring the war to an end at Yorktown. After its conclusion, the first official recognition of the infant United States was a 17-gun salute fired from the British warship HMS Perseverance which had sailed to Snedens Landing for General Sir Guy Carleton to meet General Washington at neighboring Tappan.

=== 19th century ===
In 1800 the population of Palisades was 114. Because of the local topography the town was well suited to become a river center. Rising from the west bank of the Hudson River, the Palisades Cliff forms an obstacle to transport seeking access to the river. A break in the terrain occurs at Palisades, still known as Snedens Landing in the early 19th century, where the landscape is rugged but not precipitous. It afforded New Jersey farmers the opportunity to bring their produce down Washington Springs Road to the river, where they could ship it across to the east side of the Hudson and continue down to New York City. Also, at this time the city created a demand for quarried stones for use in paving streets and building houses. According to tradition, the stones cut from the Palisades Cliff paved many New York City streets, including Broadway. Snedens Landing provided these farmers and quarrymen with the first access for a stretch of about 13 miles above Burdetts Landing, or roughly the spot where the George Washington Bridge connects New Jersey and New York today. The town became so busy that a 500-foot pier was constructed. In the first half of the 19th century steamboats began plying the Hudson. The Sneden family, which continued to ferry passengers and goods across to Dobbs Ferry, also communicated with steamboat traffic, which could not dock in the shallow water at the shore, mid-river.

In the mid-19th century the Erie and Northern railroads arrived and drew off much of the transportation which had earlier depended upon river shipping. In 1855 the town's name officially became Palisades.

With its raison d'etre diminished, Palisades languished. Its 500-foot pier was abandoned and disintegrated. The once thriving river port transformed to an agriculture-based economy depending upon orchards, vineyards and farms. By the 1870s railroad travel enabled wealthy New Yorkers to build seasonal homes in Palisades. Not only did these newcomers promote the economy by employing local workers on their estates, they enriched community affairs, establishing a library and the Presbyterian church.

=== 20th century ===
At the turn of the century the population of Palisades was almost 400. Modern conveniences arrived, such as piped water in 1910 and electricity in 1920. Access by car was facilitated in 1929 by the construction of U.S. Route 9W, the George Washington Bridge connecting the east and west sides of the Hudson in 1931, and the Palisades Parkway in 1955.

== Arts and culture ==
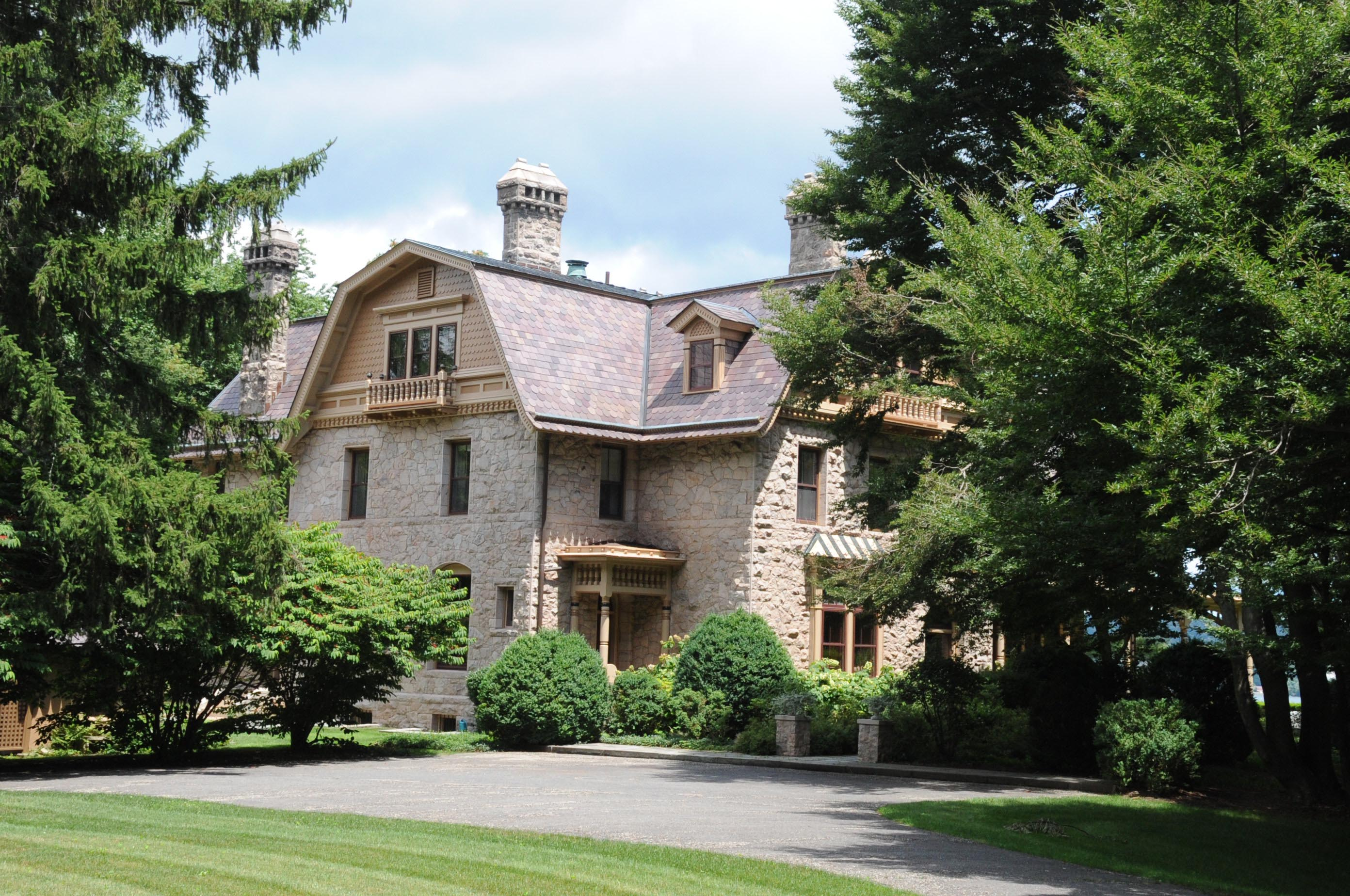
Cliffside, built 1876

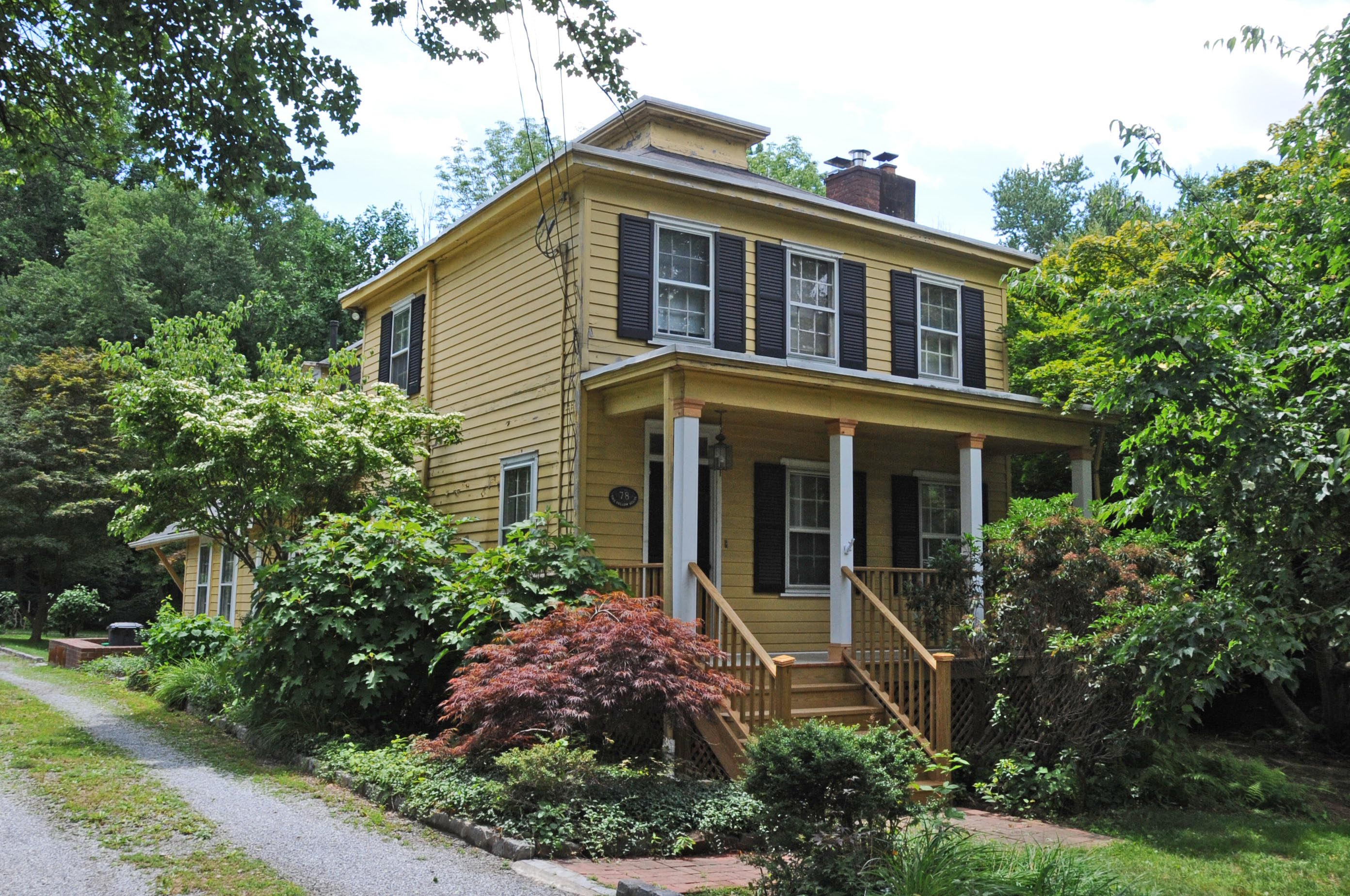
Concklin House, built 1859

=== Historical sites ===
- Skunk Hollow
- Cliffside (Palisades, New York)
- Closter Road-Oak Tree Road Historic District
- Washington Spring Road-Woods Road Historic District
- Abner Concklin House
- Big House
- Haring-Eberle House
- Little House
- Sneden's Ferry – The Sneden family operated a ferry at Sneden's Landing along with John Dobbs, who operated from the opposite shore Dobbs Ferry, New York. Begun by Dobbs in 1698, the ferry service was one of the oldest in the region and continued until 1944. In 1775, when Martha Washington and her son John Parke Custis, George Washington's stepson, drove from Mount Vernon to Cambridge, Massachusetts to meet her husband, ferry mistress Mollie Sneden (1709–1810) piloted her across the Hudson River.
- Neiderhurst
- Seven Oaks Estate

=== Local organizations and services ===
Institutions include an HNA conference center, and the Lamont–Doherty Earth Observatory (of Columbia University). There is also a library and community center.

== Education ==
Students attend South Orangetown Central School District. High school-aged students attend Tappan Zee High School in Orangeburg.

- Lamont–Doherty Earth Observatory - (research institution)

== Infrastructure ==
=== Transportation ===
Palisades is served by Rockland Coaches, with service to the George Washington Bridge Bus Terminal, Port Authority Bus Terminal, and locations throughout eastern Rockland County.

Major roadways and highways:

- US 9W
- Palisades Interstate Parkway
- New York State Route 340

=== Emergency services ===
Palisades is served by the Orangetown Police Department, the South Orangetown Ambulance Corps., and the Sparkill-Palisades Fire Department.

== Notable people ==
- Trey Anastasio, musician
- Mikhail Baryshnikov, dancer, choreographer, and actor
- Chuck Barris, game show producer and host
- Lorraine Bracco, actress
- Ellen Burstyn, actress
- James Cox Chambers, billionaire businessman and heir
- Katharine Cornell, actress-manager, and Guthrie McClintic, producer-director
- Noël Coward, playwright and composer
- John Dos Passos, writer
- Tina Fey, actor
- Katharine Hepburn, actor
- William Hurt, actor
- Patricia Highsmith, writer
- Scarlett Johansson, actress
- Angelina Jolie, American actress, attended elementary school in the town.
- Vivien Leigh, actress
- Bill Murray, actor and comedian
- Laurence Olivier, actor
- Al Pacino, actor
- Hayden Panettiere, actress
- Jansen Panettiere, actor
- Aidan Quinn, actor
- Rodney Smith, photographer
- Edgar Snow, American journalist
- Mike Wallace, news commentator
- Orson Welles, director and actor
- Pinchas Zukerman, violinist and composer

== In popular culture ==
The 1988 Neil Simon play Rumors takes place in Sneden's Landing.

Because of the large number of A-list actors who have made the area their home over the years, it has come to be known as "Hollywood on the Hudson."
