= Big House (Palisades, New York) =

Historic house in New York, United States

- U.S. National Register of Historic Places
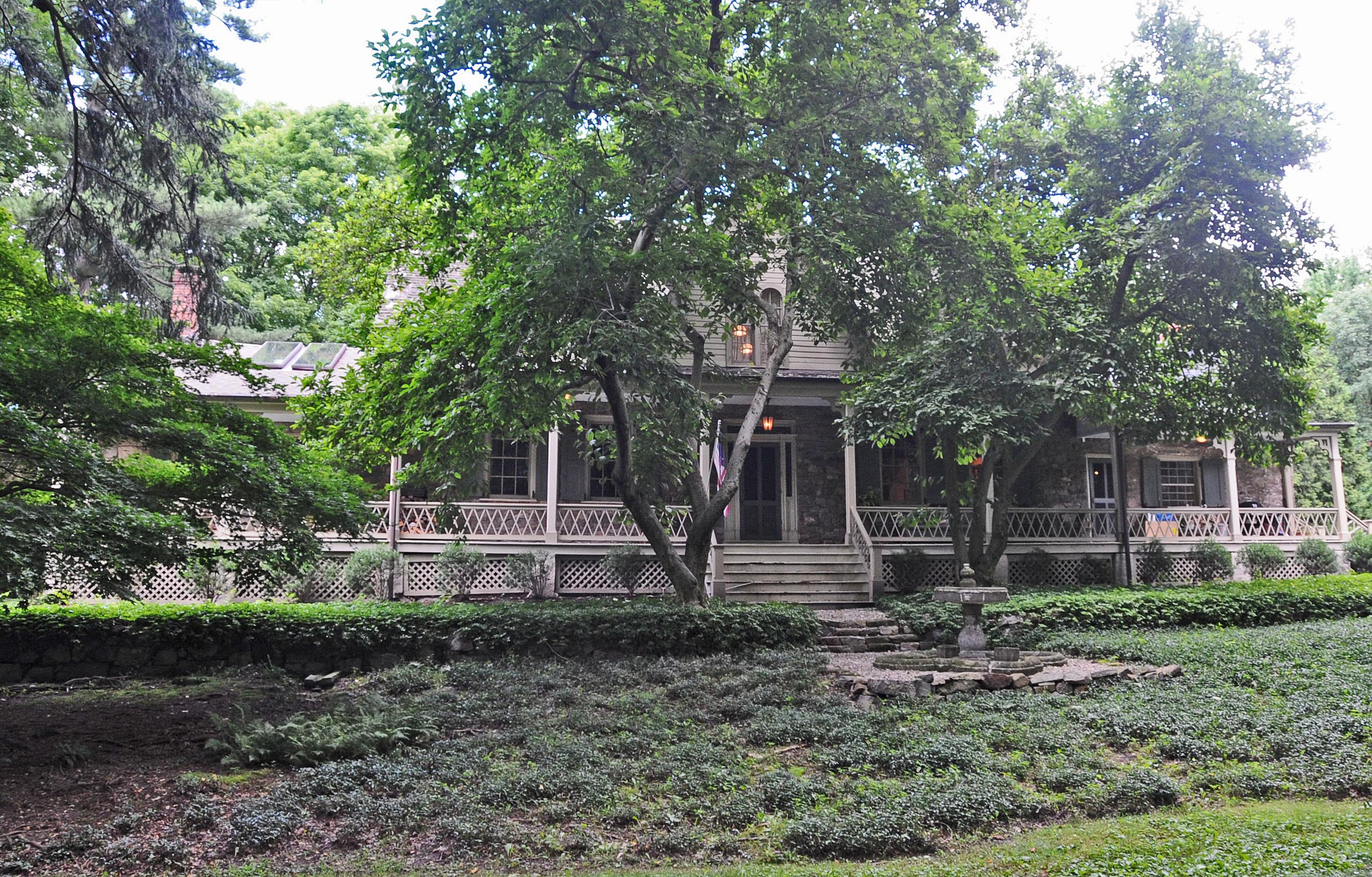

- Location within New York Location within the United States
- Location: US 9W near jct. with Closter Rd., Palisades, New York
- Coordinates: 41°0′45″N 73°54′47″W
- Area: 3.1 acres (1.3 ha)
- Built: 1735
- Architectural style: Gothic Revival, Vernacular Dutch Colonial
- MPS: Palisades MPS
- NRHP reference No.: 90001008
- Added to NRHP: July 12, 1990

Big House is a historic home located at Palisades in Rockland County, New York. The Big House is the oldest dwelling in Palisades and the only building remaining from the hamlet's formative years. It was built about 1735 and is a large stone dwelling in a vernacular ethnic "Dutch" style. It consists of a rectangular central block flanked on either side by wings. In the nomination for the National Register of Historic Places it is further described as embodying

the distinctive characteristics of the eighteenth-century regional Dutch vernacular building tradition, specifically its 1 1/2-story, gable-roofed form, linear plan, multiple entrances, and masonry construction.

It was listed on the National Register of Historic Places in 1990.
