= Dutch door =

Type of door

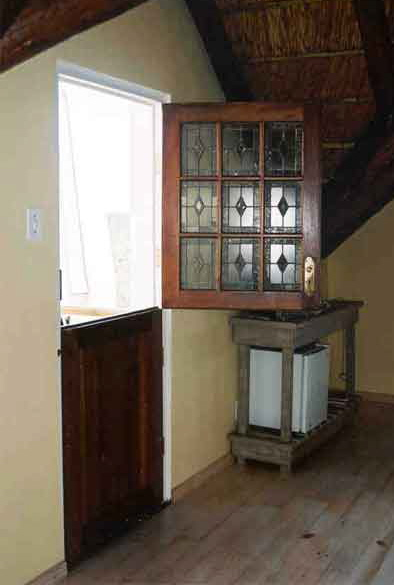
A Dutch door with the top half open, in South Africa

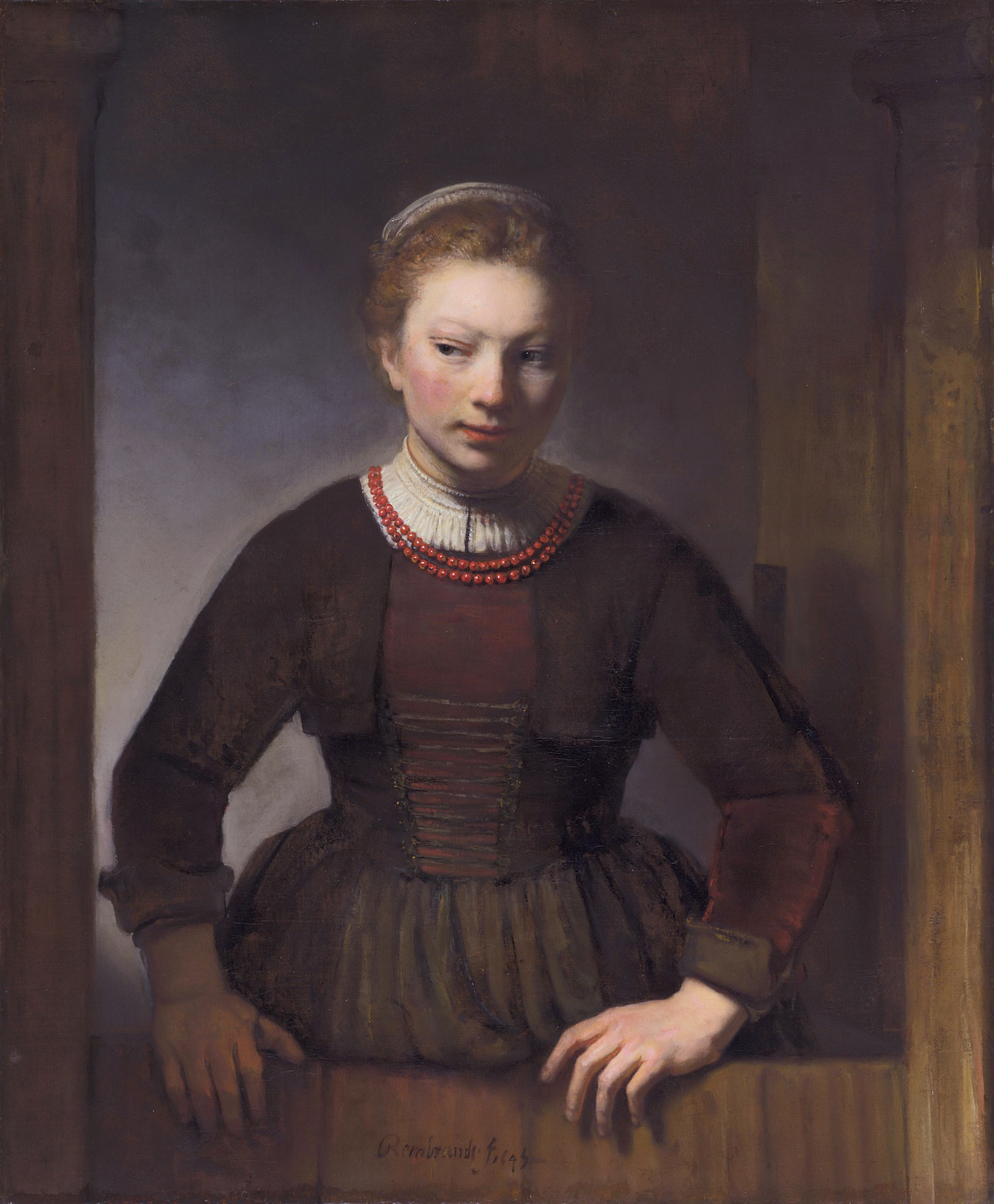
Woman at a Dutch Door, 1645, by Samuel van Hoogstraten

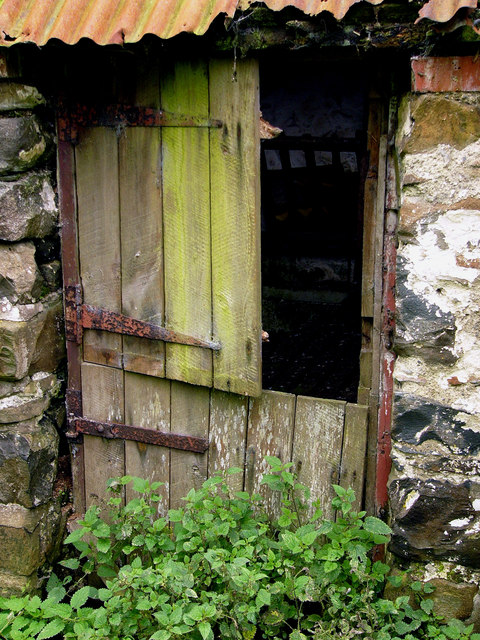
Old half-door in East Crosherie, Wigtownshire, Scotland

A Dutch door (American English), stable door (British English), half door (Hiberno-English), or double-hung door is a door divided so that the bottom leaf may remain shut while the top leaf opens, essentially combining a door with a window. With the bottom closed, animals and windblown dirt are kept out, and children are kept in; with the top open, light and air can enter.

The bottom is considered to be the door. The top is the wicket, gate, or hatch. Historically, the bottom may also be called the hatch.

The top and bottom may be connected with a Dutch door bolt so that they open and close as a unit.

There may be a weather cap or drop cap on the bottom leaf, sometimes called a perch or gossip shelf.

== Uses ==
=== Netherlands and Dutch America ===
This type of door was common in the Netherlands in the 17th century and appears in Dutch paintings of the period. It was also commonly found in the culturally Dutch areas of New York and New Jersey before the American Revolution.

=== Rail cars ===
Dutch doors were often used in passenger railcars in North America to allow crewmen to interact with employees outside or to carry out visual inspections. In Australia, post-war passenger cars and brakevans were similarly configured. Those on passenger cars were later converted to conventional doors for passenger safety. In Canada, changes to operating rules rendered Dutch doors obsolete, although older rolling stock retains them.

=== Ireland ===
Similar doors were once commonplace in Irish houses, called half-doors (Irish: leathdoras or comhla bheag). According to The Irish Times, "A traditional half-door is really a door and a half – a full door that opens inwards and a half door set to the front of the frame that opens outwards." They were designed to keep poultry and pigs from entering the house, while allowing air and sunlight into the usually dark and smoky cottages.

=== Indoors ===
They have been used indoors in residential care homes to control wandering but maintain a line of sight and in child-care environments, but in that context, there are risks of finger-trapping and concerns over fire regulations.

== See also ==
A convection door is another type of split leaf door, in floor-to-ceiling configuration, with a standard size leaf and a disconnected additional leaf installed in the space above it, which enables the unrestricted passage of heated air along the ceiling from central source, improves cross ventilation, and maintains privacy.
