= Tappan Zee =

Natural widening of the Hudson River

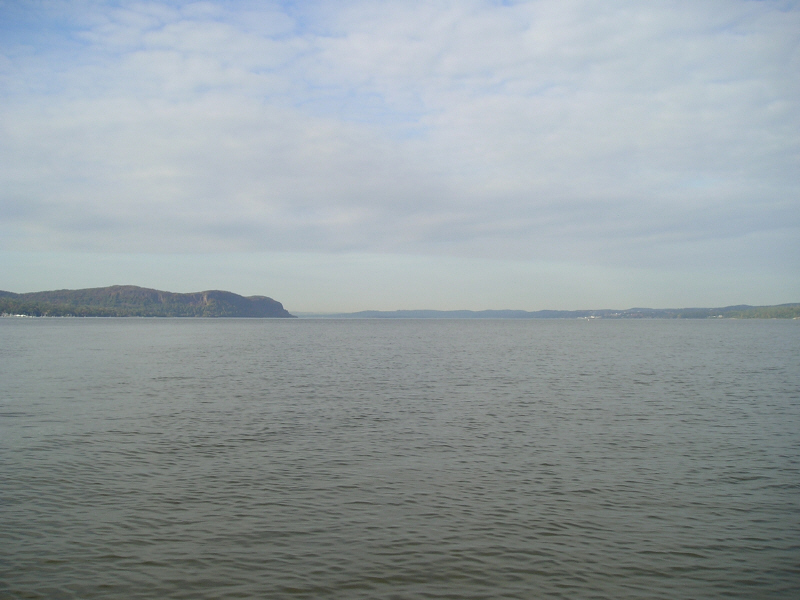
- Northern Tappan Zee
- Etymology: Tuphanne, a Lenape term thought to mean "cold water", and zee, Dutch for Sea

Location
- Country: United States
- State: New York

Physical characteristics
- Source: Hudson River, by way of Haverstraw Bay
  - location: Croton-on-Hudson, New York
  - coordinates: 41°10′03.64″N 73°53′54.65″W
  - elevation: 0 ft (0 m)
- Mouth: North River (Lower Hudson)
  - location: Dobbs Ferry, New York
  - coordinates: 41°00′47.20″N 73°53′28.81″W
  - elevation: 0 ft (0 m)
- Length: 10.5 mi (16.9 km), North-South

Basin features
- Tributaries
  - left: Croton River, Pocantico River
  - right: Sparkill Creek
- NOAA Nav Chart: 12343

The Tappan Zee (English pronunciation: /ˌtæpən ˈziː/; also Tappan Sea or Tappaan Zee) is a natural widening of the Hudson River, about 3 miles (4.8 km) across at its widest, in southeastern New York. It stretches about 10 miles (16 km) along the boundary between Rockland and Westchester counties, downstream from Croton Point to Irvington. Its name is from the Tappan people of the Lenape, and the Dutch word zee [zeː], meaning a sea.

Flanked to the west by high steep bluffs of the Palisades, it forms something of a natural lake on the Hudson about 10 miles (16 km) north of Manhattan, in New York City. Communities along the Tappan Zee include Nyack and Piermont on the western side as well as Ossining, Briarcliff Manor, Sleepy Hollow, and Tarrytown on the eastern side.

== Gallery ==
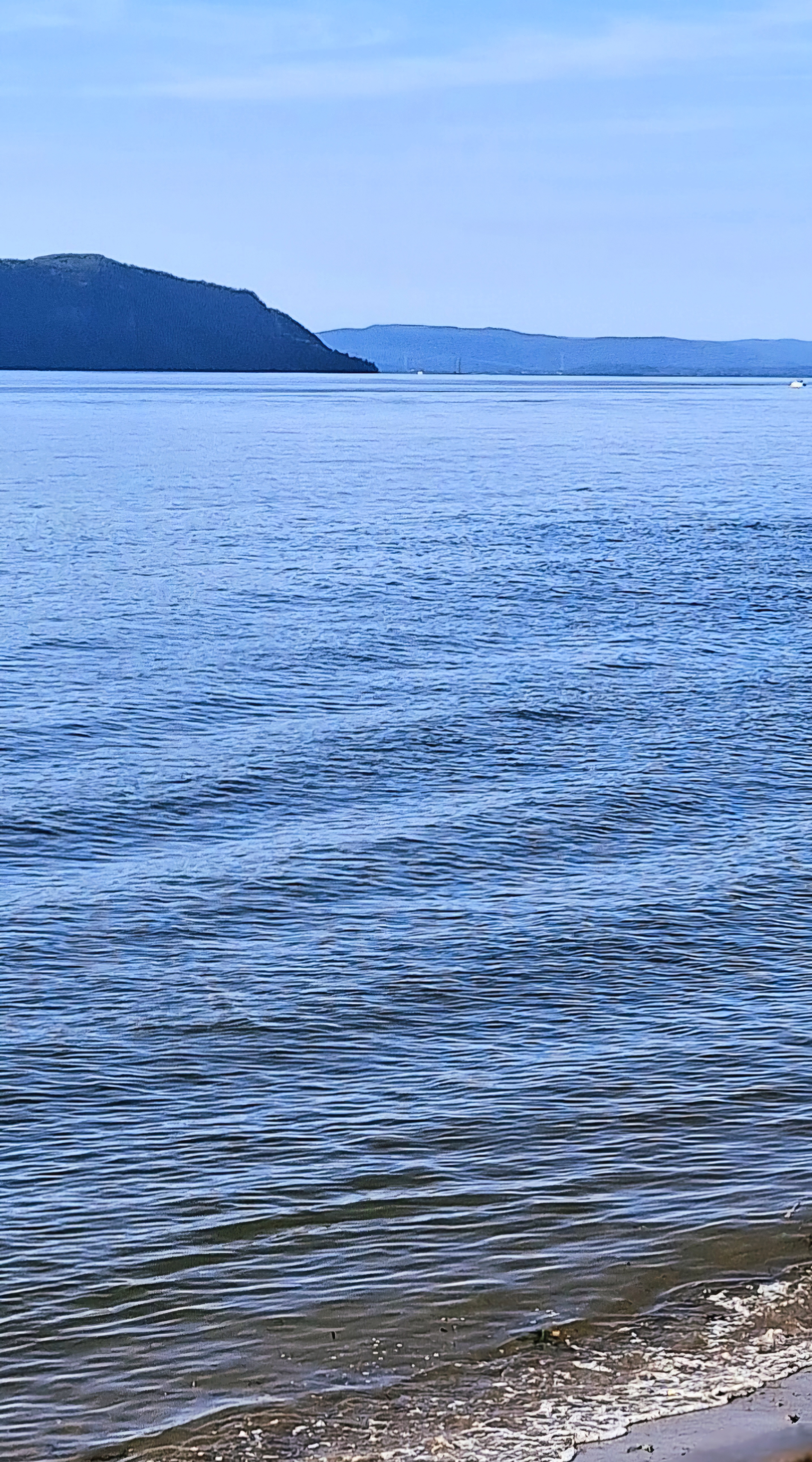
Northern Tappan Zee, with Hook Mountain

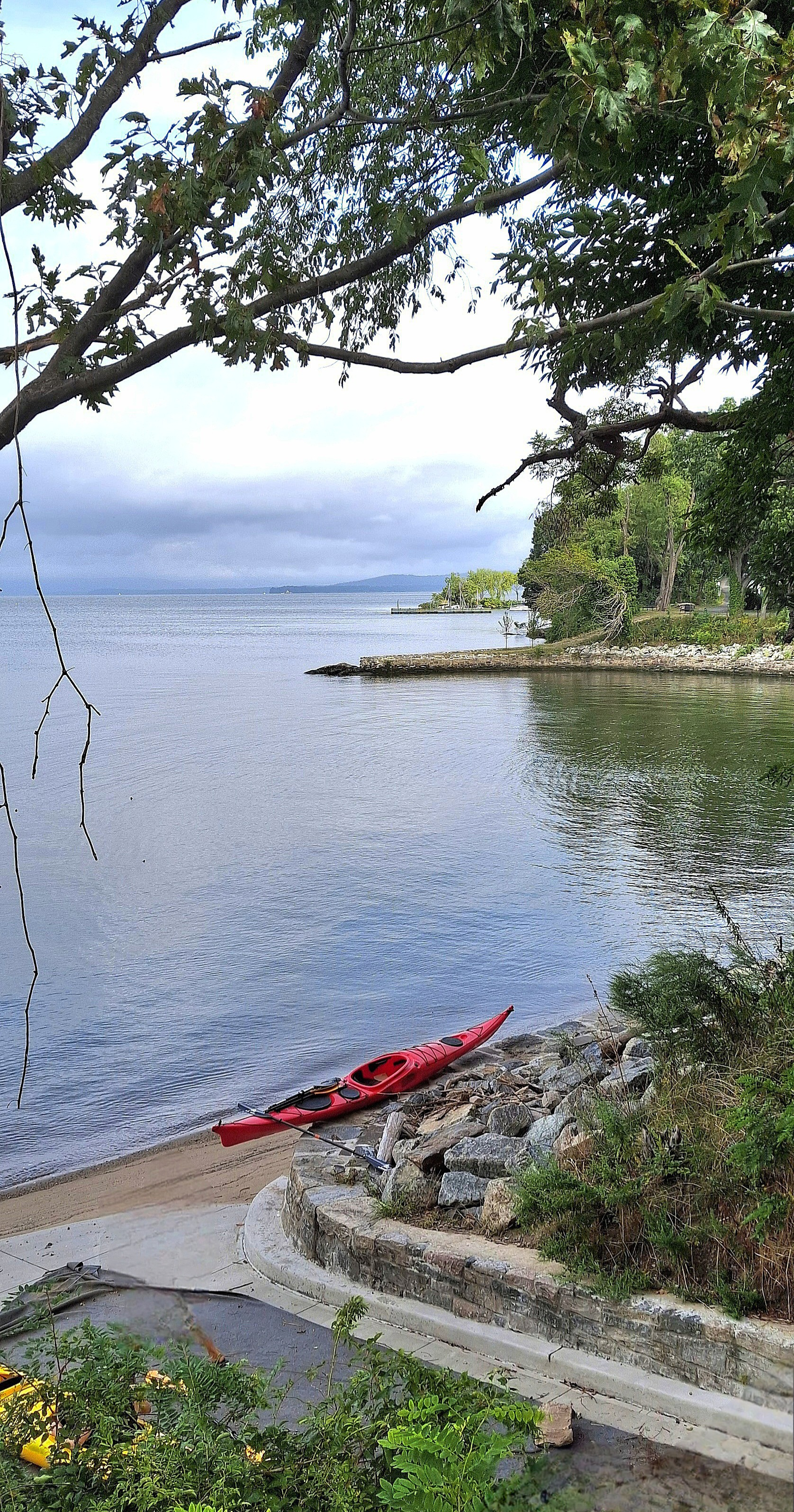
Eastern coastline of Tappan Zee, viewed from Kingsland Point Park in Sleepy Hollow

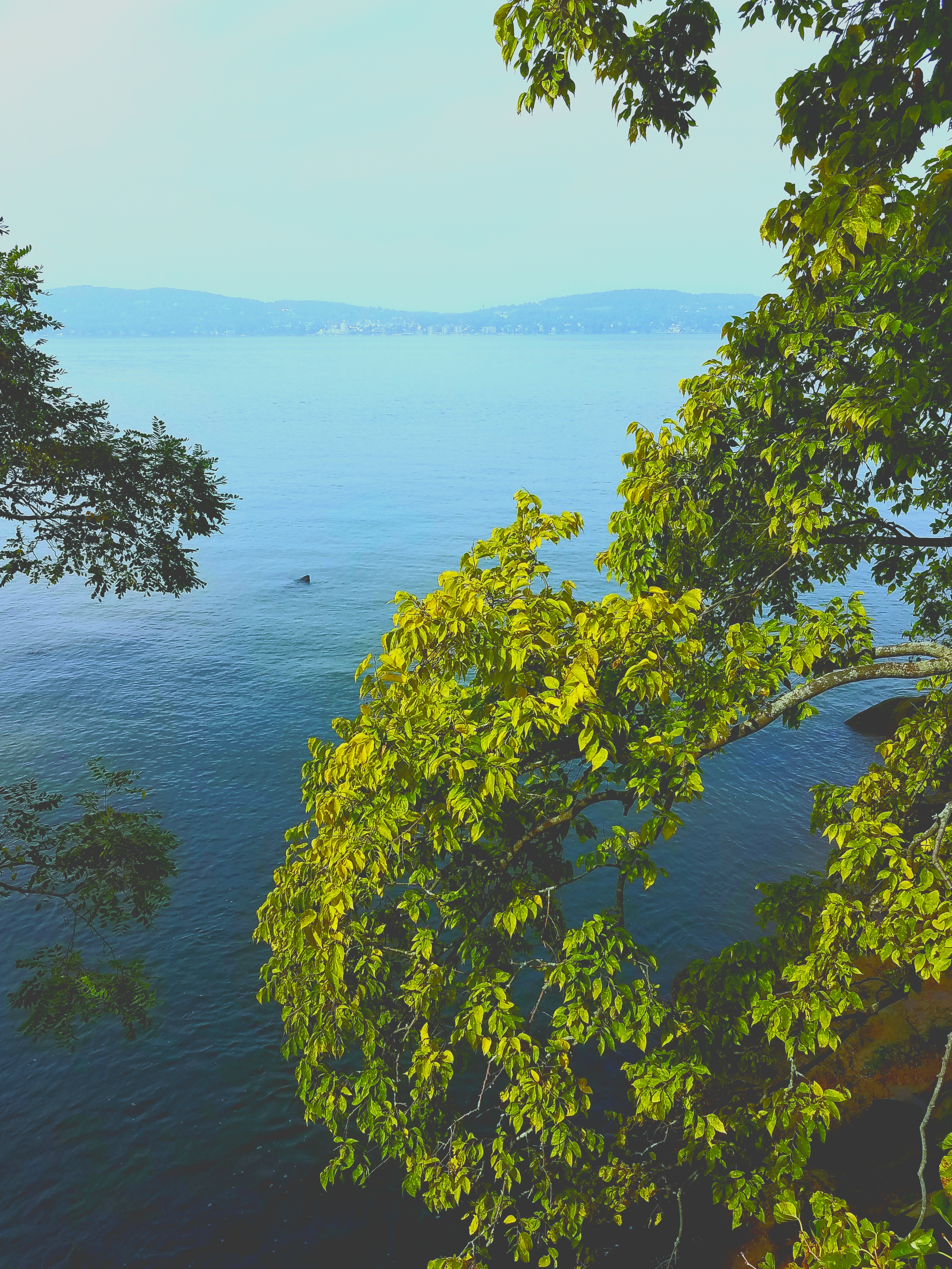
Central section of Tappan Zee, with a view of the western side

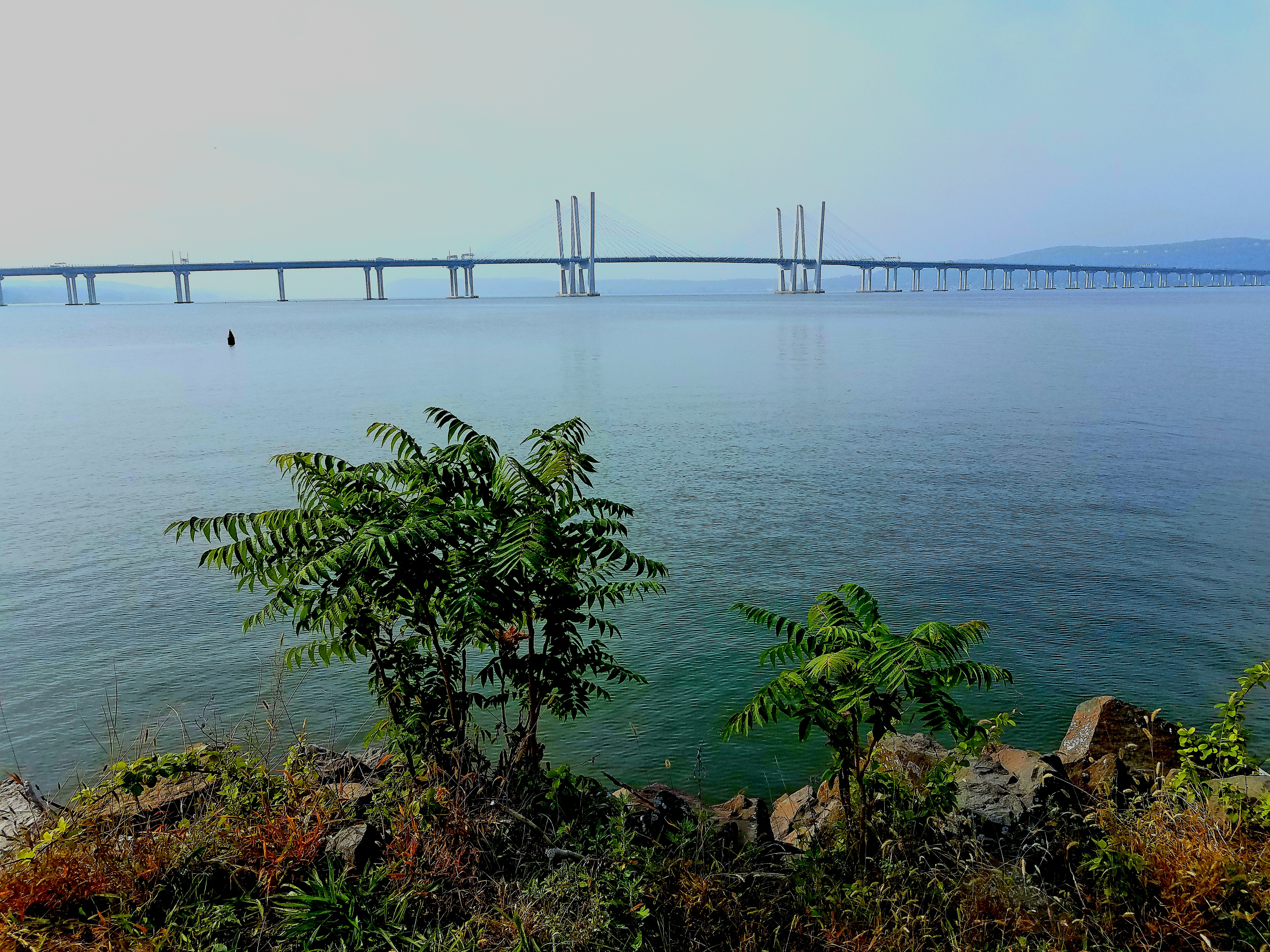
Southern Tappan Zee, with Tappan Zee (Mario Cuomo) Bridge

It was formerly crossed by the Governor Malcolm Wilson Tappan Zee Bridge, opened in 1955 and about 3.1 miles (5.0 km) long, connecting Nyack and Tarrytown. It is crossed by the modern Tappan Zee Bridge (officially the Governor Mario M. Cuomo Bridge), which opened in 2017 (north or westbound span) and 2018 (south or eastbound span) at about the same length as the old bridge.

On September 14, 1609, the explorer Henry Hudson entered the Tappan Zee while sailing upstream from New York Harbor. At first, Hudson believed the widening of the river indicated that he had found the Northwest Passage. He proceeded upstream as far as modern Troy before concluding that no such strait existed there.

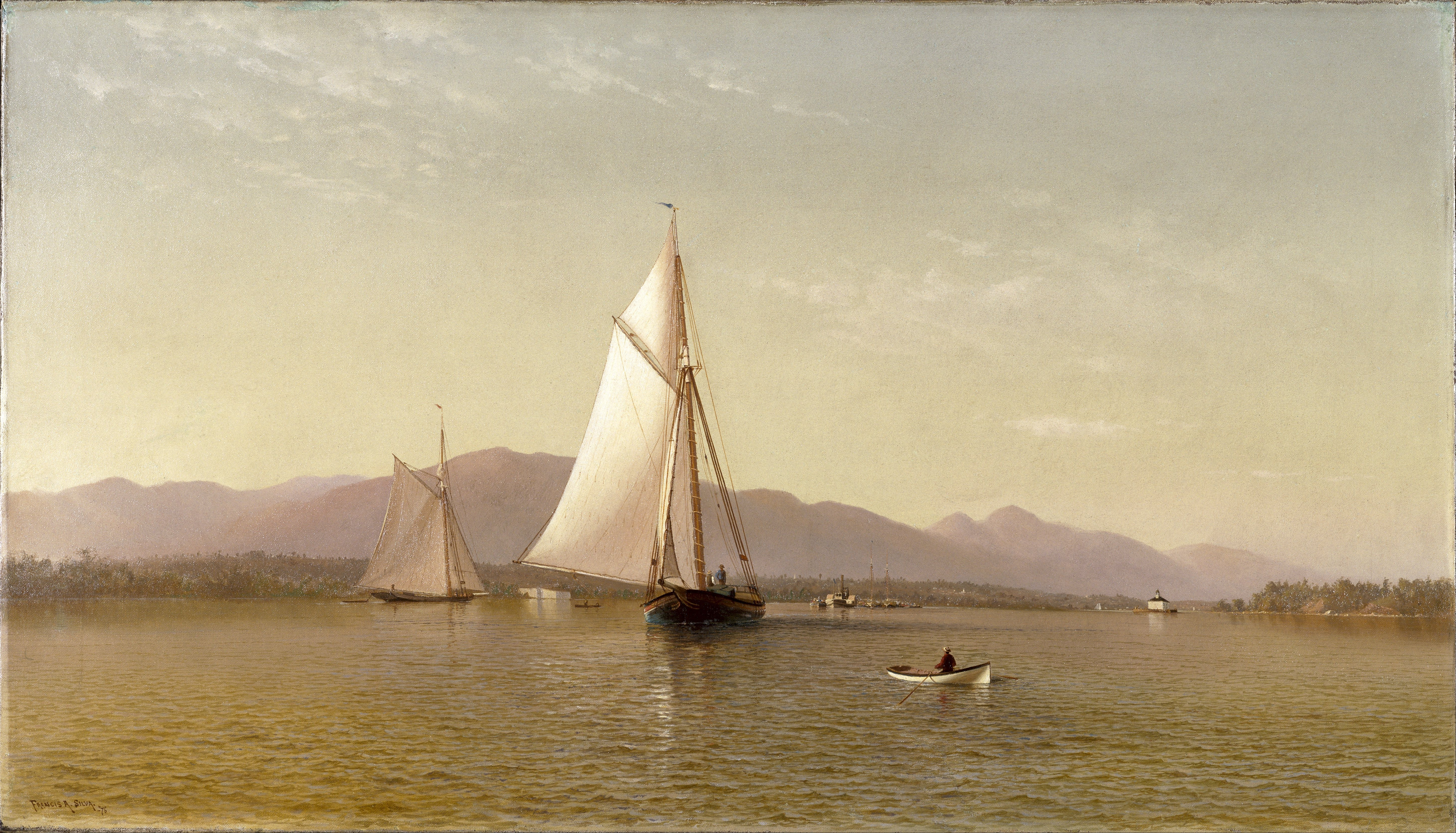
Francis Augustus Silva:The Hudson at the Tappan Zee, 1876. Oil on canvas. Brooklyn Museum

The Tappan Zee is mentioned several times in Washington Irving's famous short story, "The Legend of Sleepy Hollow." The tale is set in the vicinity of Tarrytown, in the area near Irving's own home at Sunnyside. In Frederik Pohl's 1977 Hugo Award-winning novel Gateway, the main character Robinette Broadhead has "a summer apartment overlooking the Tappan Sea and The Palisades Dam." Pohl lived in the area while writing the book. Jazz pianist Bob James named one of the tracks from his 1977 album BJ4, in addition to his record label he founded, after the Tappan Zee.

== See also ==
- Tappan Zee Bridge (1955–2017)
- Tappan Zee Bridge (2017–present)
- Haverstraw Bay
