= Rockland Road Bridge =

- U.S. National Register of Historic Places
- U.S. Historic district – Contributing property
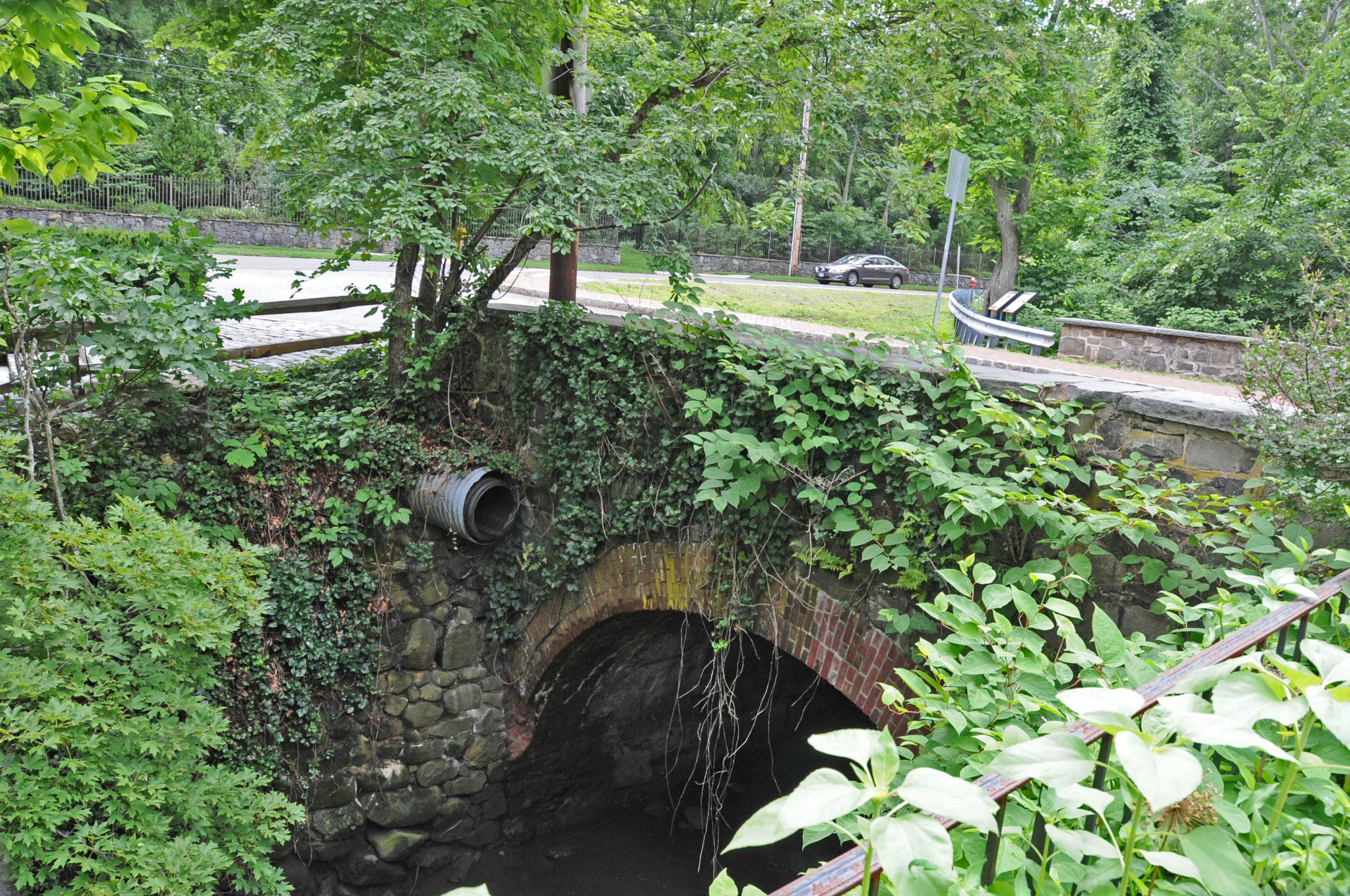

- Location within New York Location within the United States
- Location: Rockland Road, (bounded by Piermont and Ferdon Avenues), Piermont, New York
- Coordinates: 41°2′6″N 73°55′10″W
- Area: less than one acre
- Built: 1874
- Part of: Rockland Road Bridge Historic District (ID11000709)
- NRHP reference No.: 05001391

Significant dates
- Added to NRHP: December 7, 2005
- Designated CP: September 29, 2011

Rockland Road Bridge is a historic stone and brick arch bridge located at Piermont in Rockland County, New York. It was built in 1874 and spans Sparkill Creek, a tributary of the Hudson River. The bridge is located southwest of the Sparkill Creek Drawbridge.

It was listed on the National Register of Historic Places in 2005.
