= Sparkill Creek =

Creek in New York and New Jersey, United States

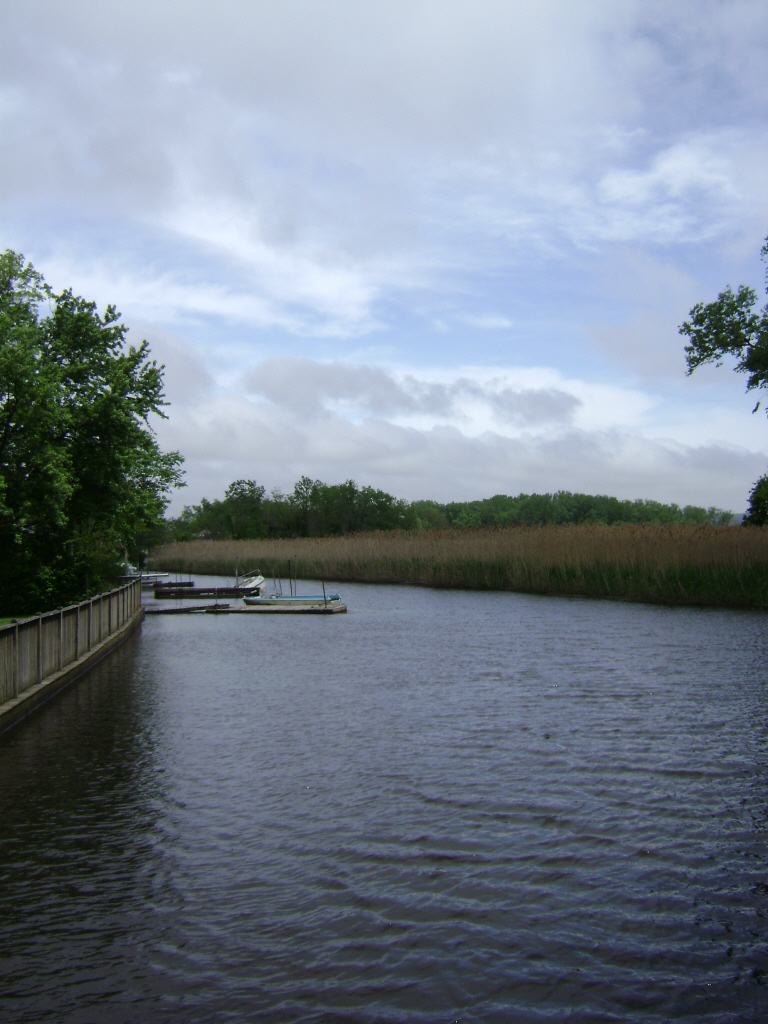
- Sparkill Creek viewed from Ferdon Ave.

Location
- Country: United States
- State: New York, New Jersey
- Counties: Rockland, Bergen

Physical characteristics
- Source
  - location: Clausland Mountain in Orangetown, Rockland County, New York, United States
  - coordinates: 41°03′50″N 73°56′40″W
  - elevation: 230 ft (70 m)
- Mouth: Hudson River
  - location: Piermont, Rockland County, New York, United States
  - coordinates: 41°02′18″N 73°54′26″W
  - elevation: 0 ft (0 m)
- Length: 8 mi (13 km)

Basin features
- Tributaries
  - right: Sparkill Brook

Sparkill Creek is a tributary of the Hudson River in Rockland County, New York and Bergen County, New Jersey in the United States. It flows through the Sparkill Gap in the Hudson Palisades, which was created by a fault line which provided the only sea-level break in the Palisades.

Sparkill Creek is 8 miles (13 km) long and drains 11.1 square miles (29 km^{2}) of watershed. It begins from runoff from Clausland Mountain in Orangetown, New York. Small tributaries feed the creek as it flows through the hamlets of Blauvelt, Orangeburg, and Tappan, New York, the borough of Northvale, New Jersey, the hamlets of Palisades and Sparkill, and finally the village of Piermont, New York before emptying into the Hudson River at Piermont Marsh.

The creek is spanned in its tidal section by the Sparkill Creek Drawbridge, which was listed on the National Register of Historic Places in 1985.

The creek is rich in history, beauty and ecological significance, however its watershed has faced threats from Rockland County's population boom following the construction of the Tappan Zee Bridge which have affected the health of the creek. The creek's flooding, as well as the pollution run off have caused problems for the areas through which it flows. Fear of damage to a number of important historic sites from flooding has prompted some state aid to address the problem.

The same fault line which allows Sparkill Creek to flow through the Palisades, also enabled the New York and Erie Railroad to construct a line down to the river, where it built a 1-mile (1.6 km) long pier at Piermont. There, goods from its trains were offloaded onto barges and floated down the river to New York City.

== Etymology ==
The name Sparkill comes from the Dutch spar and the Middle Dutch kille, which translates literally to “Spruce Creek”. In this sense, the name Sparkill Creek is technically redundant as it would mean “Spruce Creek Creek”. The Dutch naming is reflective of the New York-New Jersey region, which features similarly named waterways, such as the nearby Dwars Kill, and others such as the Arthur Kill, Kill Van Kull, Jan De Bakker's Kill, and Beaver Kill.

It was also known historically as Tappan Creek.

== Course ==
Sparkill Creek rises along the south border of Blauvelt State Park on the western flank of Clausland Mountain, part of the Hudson River Palisades. Coursing south, it enters the hamlets of Blauvelt and Orangeburg, flowing under NY 303 twice as it winds towards the hamlet of Tappan. Just north of the hamlet of Sparkill, the creek turns to the southwest and passes beneath the Palisades Interstate Parkway and, again, NY 303. Turning south again, the creek passes through downtown Tappan and crosses the New York border, entering Northvale, New Jersey. The creek abruptly turns to the east in Northvale, flowing a short distance before crossing the state line again and reemerging back into New York. Between Tappan and the hamlet of Palisades, Sparkill Brook joins the Creek from the south as its turns to the northeast and enters the Sparkill Gap, a break in the ridge of the Hudson River Palisades.

Passing beneath US 9W and through the hamlet of Sparkill, the creek is impounded by a small dam forming Moore's Mill Pond. Below this dam it is impounded by a larger dam, forming Ferdon Mill Pond. Downstream of the large dam, part of a former mill complex in Piermont, the creek becomes tidal. This section of the creek was once navigable to commercial vessel traffic from the Hudson River, but it is now blocked by a low, fixed span, the Ferdon Ave Bridge, a quarter mile downstream of the former mill complex. Immediately before the Ferdon Ave Bridge is its predecessor, the Sparkill Creek Drawbridge, which when operational opened to allow Hudson River vessel traffic to travel upstream.

The portion of Sparkill Creek downstream of the Ferdon Ave Bridge is navigable to motorized vessels, and homes along this section of the waterway have docks for their watercraft. NOAA nautical chart #12343 Hudson River to Wappinger Creek covers this section of the creek, and the electronic navigation version of this chart shows the majority of water depths along the waterway to be 0.6 meter, or approximately two feet, with some deeper and shallower spots. The final section of the creek meanders three quarters of a mile through the Piermont Marsh before terminating at the Hudson River just south of Piermont Pier.

== Tributaries and diversions ==
=== Sparkill Brook ===
Sparkill Brook is the chief tributary of Sparkill Creek. It flows generally north through New Jersey, beginning in Alpine and coursing through Norwood and Rockleigh before crossing the New York State border and merging with Sparkill Creek between the hamlets of Tappan and Palisades. Confusingly, GNIS actually lists two entries for Sparkill Creek (IDs 880777 and 965946), one with the source just south of Blauvelt State Park (the head of Sparkill Creek proper), and one with the source in Alpine, New Jersey (the head of Sparkill Brook). This is consistent with historical works which show the source of Sparkill Creek to be either in New Jersey or New York, or both, with Sparkill Creek simply having a north and south branch.

=== Tappan Run Diversion ===
United Water, a subsidiary of Suez Environnement, maintains a diversion system on Sparkill Creek in Northvale, New Jersey. The diversion allows water from Sparkill Creek (Hudson River Basin) to be released into Tappan Run (Hackensack River Basin). Tappan Run flows into Dorotockey's Run and ultimately the Oradell Reservoir, which is managed by United Water.

== See also ==
- Piermont (Erie Railroad station)
