= Piermont, New York =

- Village
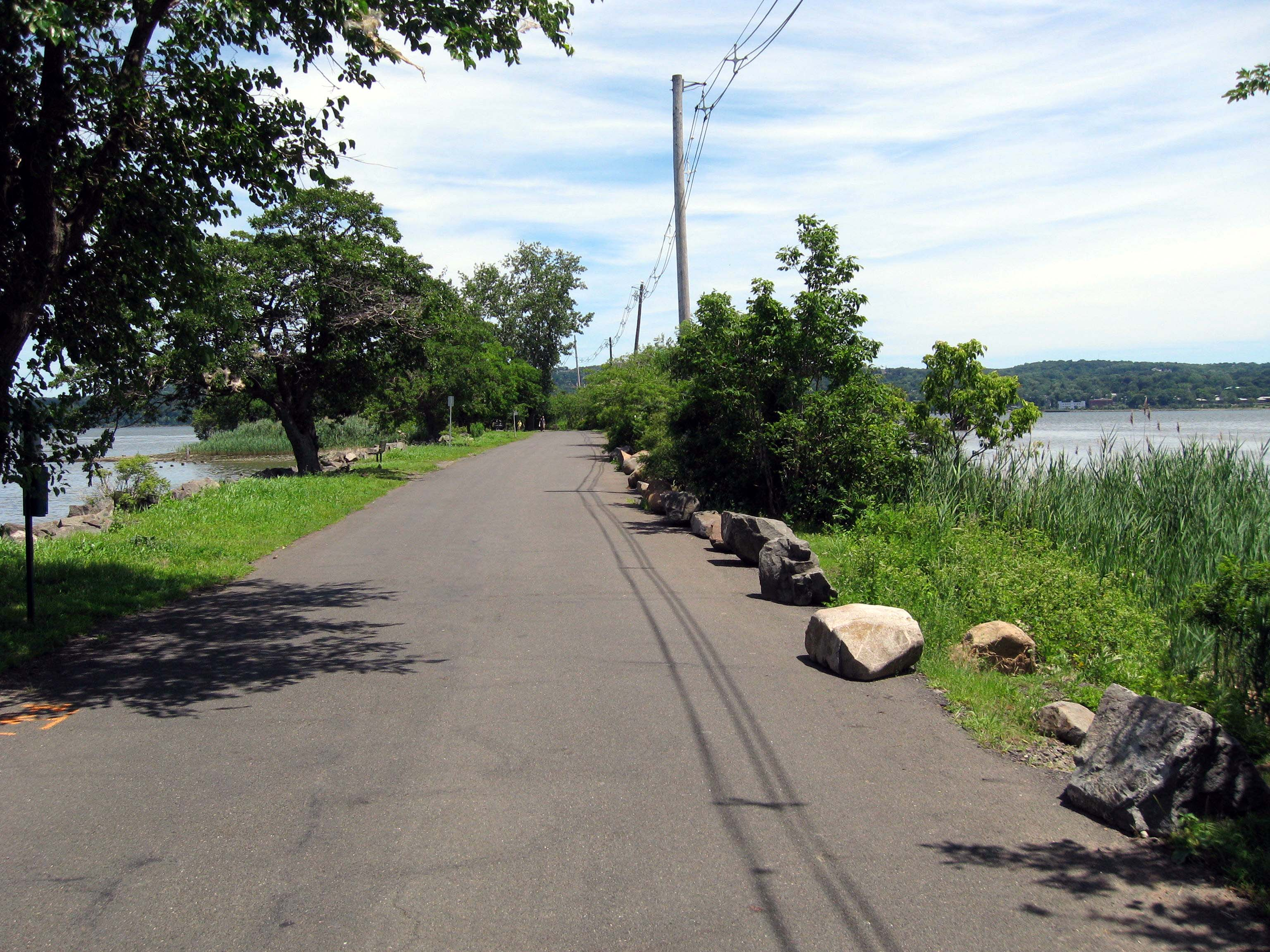
- A short section of Piermont's long pier, the village's most prominent physical feature

- Location in Rockland County and the state of New York.

- Location within New York
- Coordinates: 41°2′26″N 73°55′8″W
- Country: United States
- State: New York
- County: Rockland
- Town: Orangetown
- Incorporated: 1859

Government
  - Mayor: Nathan S. Mitchell
  - Deputy Mayor: Mark Blomquist
  - Trustees: Ivanya L. Alpert, Richard Owens Burns, and Christine Andrews

Area
  - Total: 1.12 sq mi (2.89 km^{2})
  - Land: 0.67 sq mi (1.74 km^{2})
  - Water: 0.44 sq mi (1.15 km^{2})
- Elevation: 95 ft (29 m)

Population (2020)
  - Total: 2,517
  - Density: 3,741.7/sq mi (1,444.66/km^{2})
- Time zone: UTC−5 (EST)
  - Summer (DST): UTC−4 (EDT)
- ZIP Code: 10968
- Area code: 845
- FIPS code: 36-57749
- GNIS feature ID: 960362
- Website: https://piermont-ny.gov/

Piermont (English pronunciation: /ˈpiːɹmɒnt/) is a village incorporated in 1847 in Rockland County, New York, United States. Piermont is in the town of Orangetown, located north of the hamlet of Palisades, east of Sparkill, and south of Grand View-on-Hudson, on the west bank of the Hudson River. The population was 2,517 at the 2020 census. Woody Allen set The Purple Rose of Cairo (1984) in Piermont.

The village's name, in earlier years known as Tappan Landing, was given by Dr. Eleazar Lord, author, educator, deacon of the First Protestant Dutch Church and first president of the Erie Railroad. It was derived by combining a local natural feature – Tallman Mountain – and the most prominent man-made feature of the village – the long Erie Railroad pier.

== History ==
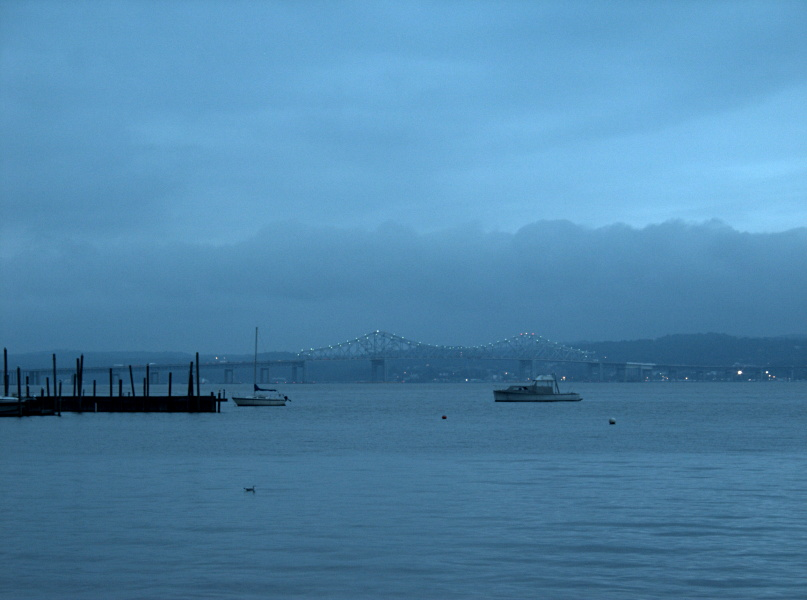
Piermont Pier, south of the Tappan Zee Bridge

Sparkill Creek cuts through the north end of the Hudson Palisades, providing easy access to the fertile valley of the unnavigable upper Hackensack River. "Tappan Landing," "Tappan Slote", or "Taulman Landing," as the little port on the Hudson River was called, thus became the original port for southern Orange County. The valley in the Palisades created by the creek also provided an obvious route for the Erie Railroad's first-built line (now known as the Piermont Branch), which originated at Suffern, New York, to reach eastward to the Hudson (with water connection to New York City). The railroad built a long pier into the river near the creek in 1839 as its principal terminal. The pier and the nearby mountains suggested a new name for the community, which was incorporated as a village in 1850. During World War II the pier was the ferry terminal to which troops from Camp Shanks marched in order to be transported to New York Port of Embarkation piers for transfer to overseas transports bound for the European Theater. A memorial plaque notes that history at the pier.

Late in the 20th century, Piermont became a modest tourist attraction for day-trippers from New York City, particularly those bicycling on Bike Route 9.

== Proposed CBM Zoning Controversy ==
In 2024 the village government led by Bruce Tucker became embroiled in controversy around a proposed three-story residential building in downtown. Village residents vehemently objected to the modern boxy architecture as wholly inconsistent with the village's historic character and aesthetics. The legality of the village's Board of Trustees' amendment to its zoning code to facilitate the proposed development was openly challenged by the Rockland County Planning Department. Village residents also raised concerns about increased traffic, parking issues, and the site having previously served as a gas station with underground storage tanks.

Village residents and neighbors flocked to social media to express their concerns, including the establishment of Preserve Piermont on Facebook and a blog entitled Unhand Piermont! which together focus not only on the unsuitability of the proposed project but allege wrongdoing by village officials.

Dennis Hardy, former Mayor of Piermont from 1997 to 2001, noted "There was little public input. The village stubbed its nose at the county by ignoring the county planning office." Hardy also called the project was "totally out of character with downtown Main Street."

Resignations related to this controversy included Piermont Planning Board Chair Daniel Spitzer (brother of former Governor of New York Eliot Spitzer) and Piermont Trustee Nathan Mitchell.

In response to a lawsuit filed by village residents, on October 11, 2024, Rockland County Supreme Court Justice Hal Greenwald declared the law which created the Piermont Central Business Multi-Use (CBM) Zoning District “null, void and jurisdictionally invalid.” The ruling was based on the failure, under Rockland County General Municipal Law, for the Village of Piermont to have referred the law creating the new zoning district to the County Planning Department for final approval.

== Piermont Pier Imminent Collapse ==
In November 2024 the concrete end of the historical Piermont Pier was closed off as it was deemed to be structurally deficient and at risk of imminent collapse. Mayor Bruce Tucker noted "We are going to need some major money here...if anyone has any money, we'd love to talk to them."

=== Piermont Station ===
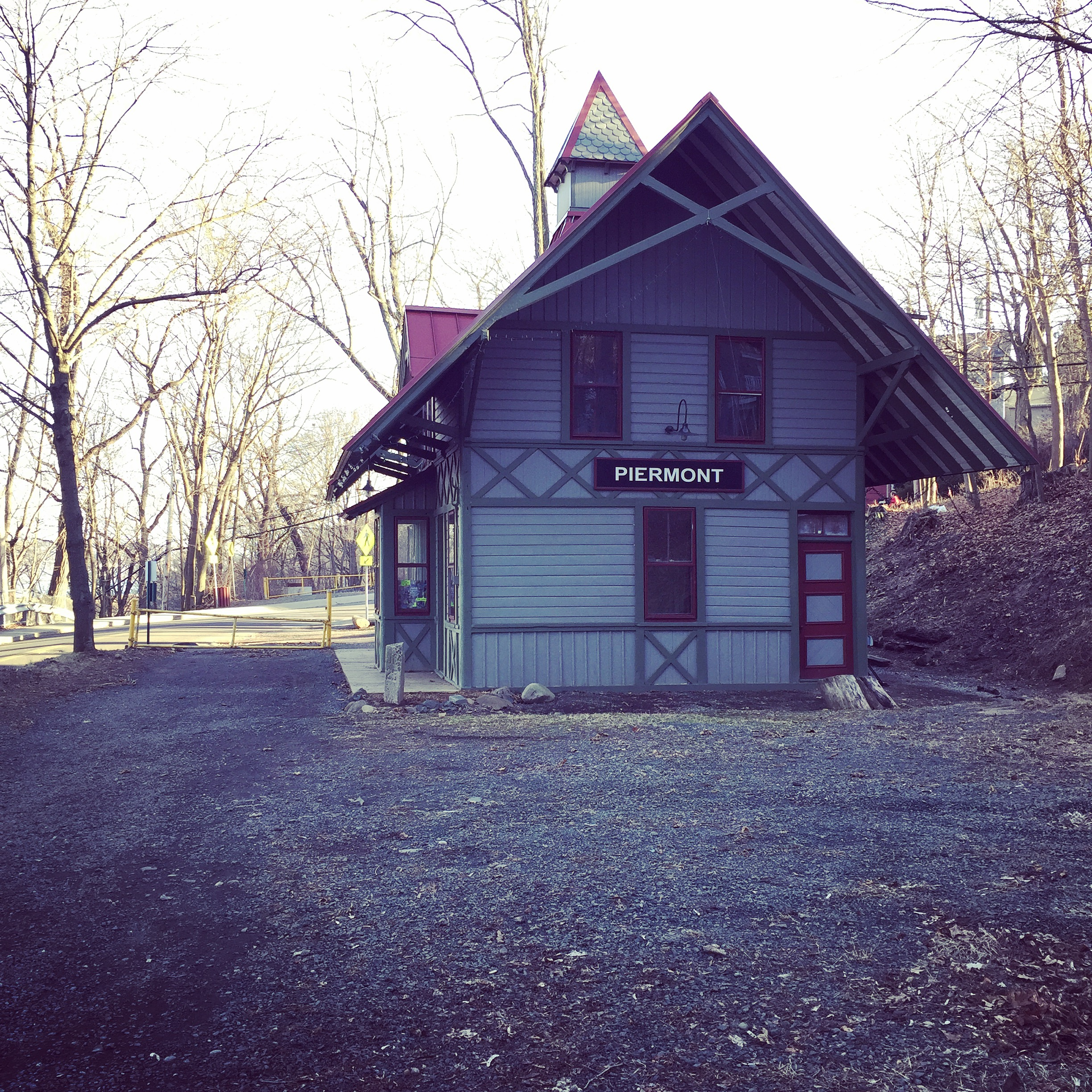
Piermont Train Station

The Piermont Branch was not the only Erie rail line that served the village. Piermont Railroad Station, located on Ash Street, is a Victorian Stick style structure built in 1873 which served as Piermont's stop for the former Erie Railroad Northern Branch north–south line, which went from Nyack, New York, to Jersey City, New Jersey. Service on the Northern Branch stopped running through Piermont in 1966. The branch was abandoned in the 1970s as a result of railroad consolidation.

The exterior of the building was renovated to its original architecture and French gray, light-green and oxide-red color scheme in 2006 by the Piermont Historical Society. They replaced the roof and installed a new 9-foot (2.7 m) cupola. The train station was placed on the National Register of Historic Places in 2006.

=== Piermont Fire Department ===
Piermont Fire Department, Rockland County department 13, is an all-volunteer fire department, providing fire, EMS, and water rescue services, and is located on Main Street. Piermont is one of the few districts in Rockland County having a Dive Rescue team, providing water rescue services from the Tappan Zee Bridge to the Palisades. In July 2026 Piermont Fire Department celebrated its 175th Anniversary.

=== Piermont hand-cranked drawbridge ===
The Piermont hand-cranked drawbridge, also known as the Sparkill Creek Drawbridge, was originally built in 1880 by the King Iron Bridge Company, a company from Cleveland, Ohio, that constructed more than 10,000 bridges over six decades. The hand-cranked drawbridge is used as a pedestrian walkway providing a link to Tallman Mountain State Park. This bridge is the only hand-cranked drawbridge in Rockland County and perhaps in the United States. Back in the day, fishermen on sloops heading up and down the creek got out of their vessel, cranked up the drawbridge, sailed across, got out of their vessel and cranked down the drawbridge for vehicular traffic. The whole bridge was dismantled piece by piece, sent off-site for restoration and restored to its original state after a complete forensic analysis. Allan King Sloan, the great-great-grandson of the company's founder, provided some of the information that is on the historical marker nearby and attended the dedication ceremony on August 7, 2009.

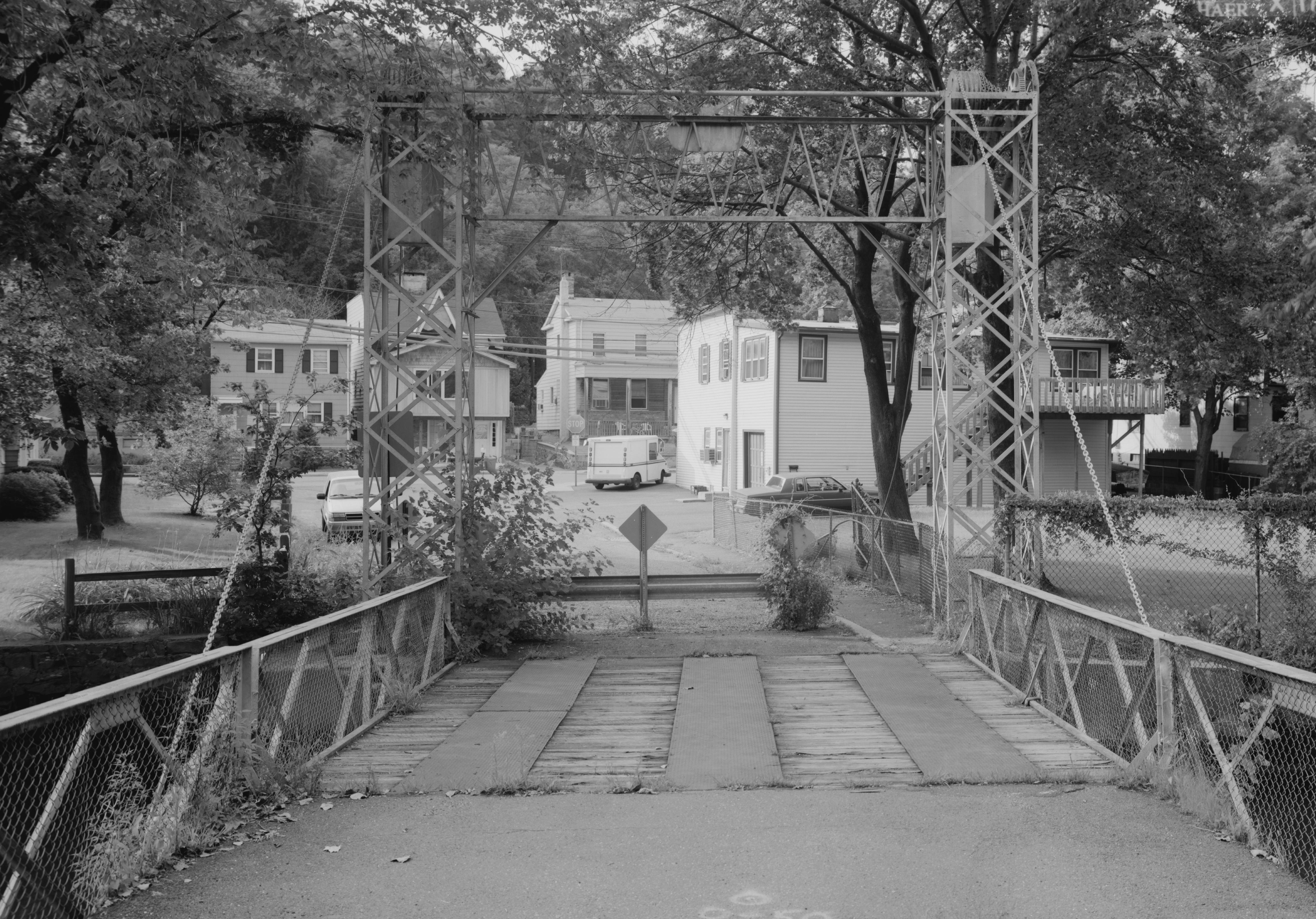
Sparkill Creek Drawbridge (1994)

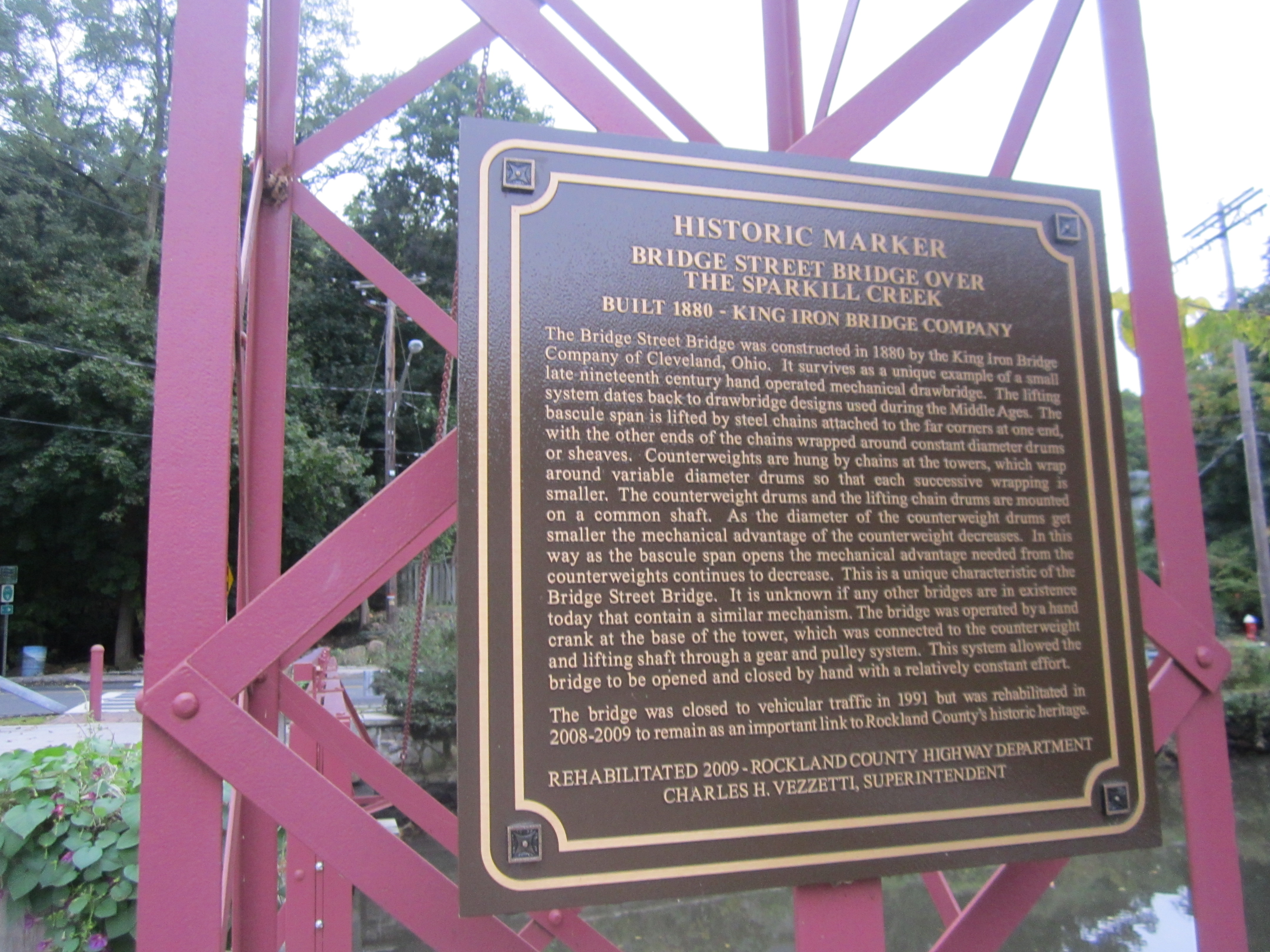
Historical Marker 2009

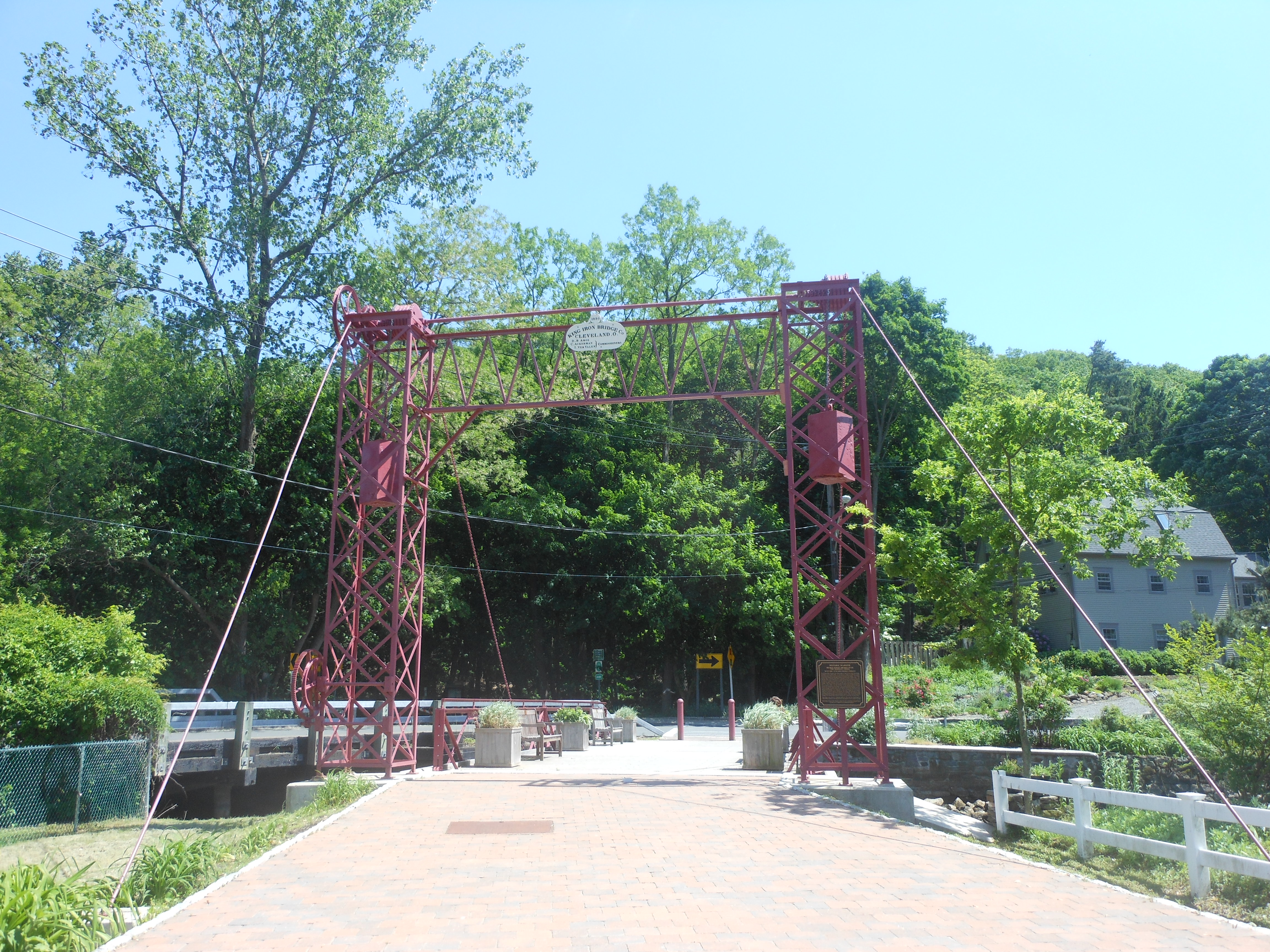
Renovated Drawbridge (2012)

=== The Mine Hole ===
The Mine Hole exists where the Palisades parts in New York and near the Sparkill Creek located on the north side of the creek in Piermont and west of the village's center. The Mine Hole refers to a deep shaft in the rock on Piermont Avenue, that once dispensed pure water to neighbors and travelers and animals.

=== Piermont Paper Company ===
The Piermont Paper Company began operations in February 1902. By 1925 many black men who migrated from nearby region and the South worked in the mill and many lived in the Mine Hole vicinity and in Nyack. Black men who were brought on as strike-breakers were not free to leave until they repaid the company the cost to bring them north from the south.

== Geography ==
Piermont is located at 41°2′26″N 73°55′8″W (41.040623, -73.918788).

According to the United States Census Bureau, the village has a total area of 1.1 square miles (2.8 km^{2}), of which 0.7 square miles (1.8 km^{2}) is land and 0.5 square miles (1.3 km^{2}), or 41.74%, is water.

Piermont is on the west bank of the Hudson River, south of the Tappan Zee Bridge.

== Demographics ==
Historical population
Census	Pop.	Note	%±
1870	1,703		—
1880	1,369		−19.6%
1890	1,219		−11.0%
1900	1,153		−5.4%
1910	1,380		19.7%
1920	1,600		15.9%
1930	1,765		10.3%
1940	1,876		6.3%
1950	1,897		1.1%
1960	1,906		0.5%
1970	2,386		25.2%
1980	2,269		−4.9%
1990	2,163		−4.7%
2000	2,607		20.5%
2010	2,510		−3.7%
2020	2,517		0.3%
U.S. Decennial Census

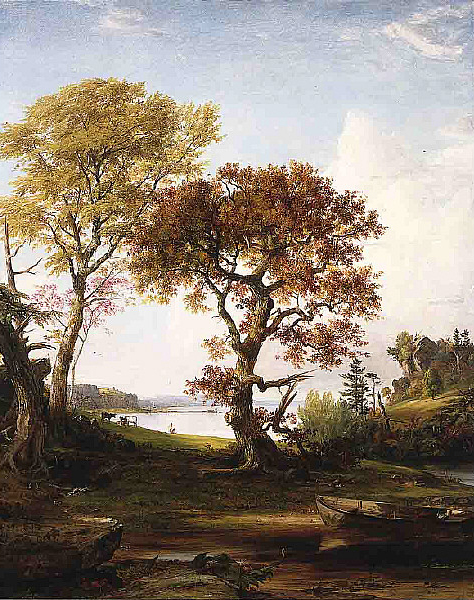
The Hudson at Piermont (1852) by Jasper Francis Cropsey

As of the census of 2000, there were 2,607 people, 1,189 households, and 672 families residing in the village. The population density was 3,878.9 inhabitants per square mile (1,497.7/km^{2}). There were 1,320 housing units at an average density of 1,964.0 per square mile (758.3/km^{2}). The racial makeup of the village was 78.75% White, 4.72% Black, 0.19% Native American, 7.79% Asian, 5.49% from other races, and 3.07% from two or more races. Hispanic or Latino of any race were 11.62% of the population.

There were 1,189 households, out of which 25.0% had children under the age of 18 living with them, 43.7% were married couples living together, 9.4% had a female householder with no husband present, and 43.4% were non-families. 35.5% of all households were made up of individuals, and 6.4% had someone living alone who was 65 years of age or older. The average household size was 2.19 and the average family size was 2.87.

In the village, the population was spread out, with 19.2% under the age of 18, 6.4% from 18 to 24, 32.7% from 25 to 44, 30.5% from 45 to 64, and 11.2% who were 65 years of age or older. The median age was 40 years. For every 100 females, there were 100.5 males. For every 100 females age 18 and over, there were 98.3 males.

The median income for a household in the village was $61,591, and the median income for a family was $89,846. Males had a median income of $50,659 versus $43,176 for females. The per capita income for the village was $43,731. About 3.0% of families and 9.0% of the population were below the poverty line, including 11.5% of those under age 18 and 4.4% of those age 65 or over.

== Notable people ==
- Alfred Bristol, a 100-year-old World War II veteran of Piermont who served his country in a segregated Army unit, was a recipient of the Rockland County Buffalo Soldier Award. The award, presented since 1993, is named after the Black 10th Cavalry Regiment that was stationed near the railroad construction camps of the Kansas Frontier in 1867. Regiment members were nicknamed “Buffalo Soldiers” by the Plains Indians, based on their exceptional and fearsome fighting reputation. They were never defeated during 23 years of service in the Indian Wars, from 1867 to 1890. Bristol enlisted in the segregated New York Army National Guard in 1931. He belonged to the “Harlem Hellfighters,” the nickname for the 369th Infantry Regiment, which was later reorganized into the 369th Anti-Aircraft Artillery Gun Battalion and was sent to the Pacific during World War II. It participated in the 10th Army Division's invasion and occupation of Okinawa, a Japanese stronghold, in 1945. Upon completing Officer Candidate School, he was commissioned as a second lieutenant, a rarity for Blacks at the time. Bristol and his wife, Carolyn, who married in 1941, moved to Shanks Village in Orangeburg after World War II where Bristol organized meetings, dances, parades and the 25-cent “Shanks Carpool” to and from New York City. Bristol played a role in the creation of Tappan Public Library and from 1963 to 1995 served as a trustee and president of the library's board. In 1967, he organized the Art for the Mountain auction to help save Clausland Mountain from development, with the 550-acre site later becoming a county park.
- Grady Anderson of Nanuet, a Vietnam-era Army veteran and the 1996 award recipient, stated “The purpose was to honor African-American unsung heroes in Rockland County who served in the military and, like their predecessors, experienced the wrath of racism, and were successful in their fields and for giving back to the community,” Anderson said.
- Thomas Pomplin - Pomplin, an African-American resident of Orangetown and a dedicated member of the Piermont Fire Department, died on August 5, 1854, while responding to a fire in Nyack.
- Army veteran David Smith of Montebello, who saw combat in Vietnam and was the 1994 award recipient, thanked Bristol “for allowing me and others to climb up your back, for the path that you laid for us. So I say that with appreciation, affection and love, and I'll salute you again, sir.”

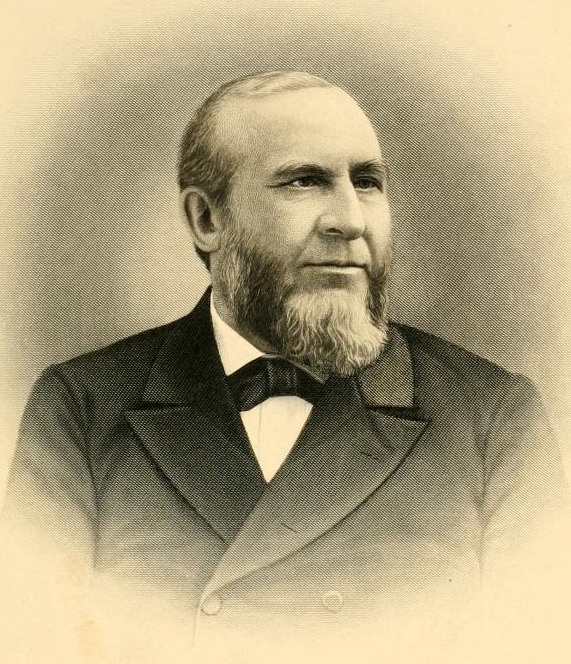
John W. Ferdon, Congressman from New York

- William Gaddis, American novelist, lived in Piermont while writing his second novel, J R (1975). The house he lived in served as the setting for his third novel, Carpenter's Gothic (1985).
- Mimi Bryan was elected Piermont's first woman mayor in 1974.
- John W. Ferdon (December 13, 1826 – August 5, 1884) Served in the United States House of Representatives, New York State Assembly (Rockland Co.) and New York State Senate (7th D.).
- Pierpoint Isham, Justice of the Vermont Supreme Court
- Al Markim, actor and producer, starred as Astro in the Tom Corbett, Space Cadet television series.
- Paul E. Olsen, professor in the Department of Earth and environmental sciences at Columbia University and member of the National Academy of Sciences
- Dennis D. Sweeney (1853–1912), of Piermont, Employed as Yard Conductor in the Erie Yards, Jersey City since about 1885, Veteran in yard service; was a Yard Master of the Rail Road in 1900s, Member of Lodge 56 and Master Switchman then later Grand Master of Lodge 115 in Jersey City, New Jersey of the Switchmen's Mutual Aid Association, was regarded as an industrious and sober man, had money saved in the bank, frequently attended lodge meetings, wrote numerous articles and newsletters in the Switchmen's Journal, was a delegate to the Dallas Convention as Chairman of the Switchmen's Mutual Aid Association, died from a bullet wound in 1912 while walking in the streets of New York at the corner of Doyers and Bowery at 3:00 p.m. the shots of which were intended for another person supposedly from a Chinese battle (“Pell Street” Battle”) also known as “Tong Fight” going on in the vicinity.

== Tourism ==
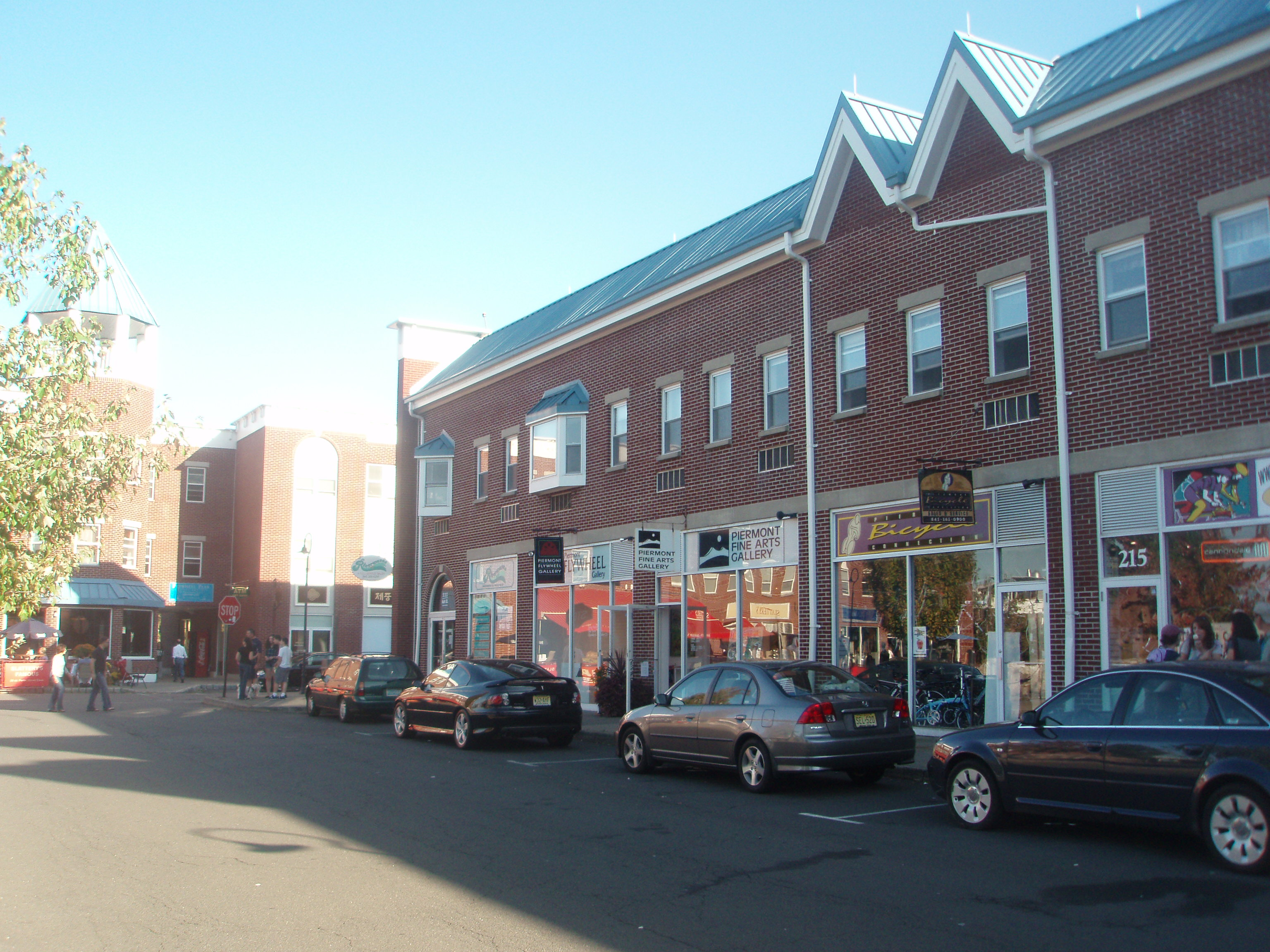
Shops and Galleries in Piermont, NY

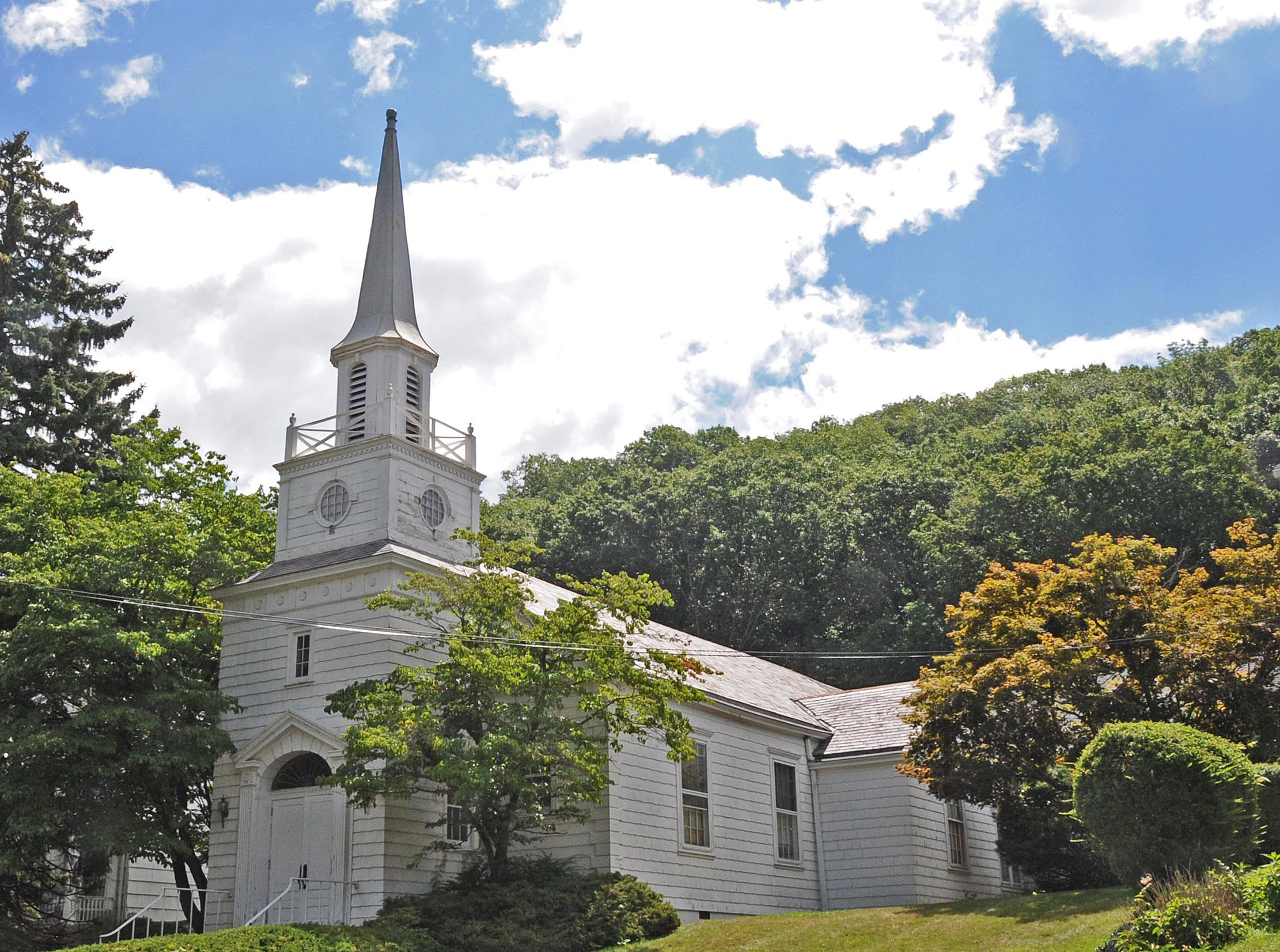
First Reformed Church - 1946

=== Historical markers ===
- Bogertown - 102 Paradise Avenue
- Sneden House - 38 Paradise Avenue
- Dederer Stone House or Stonehurst

=== Landmarks and places of interest ===
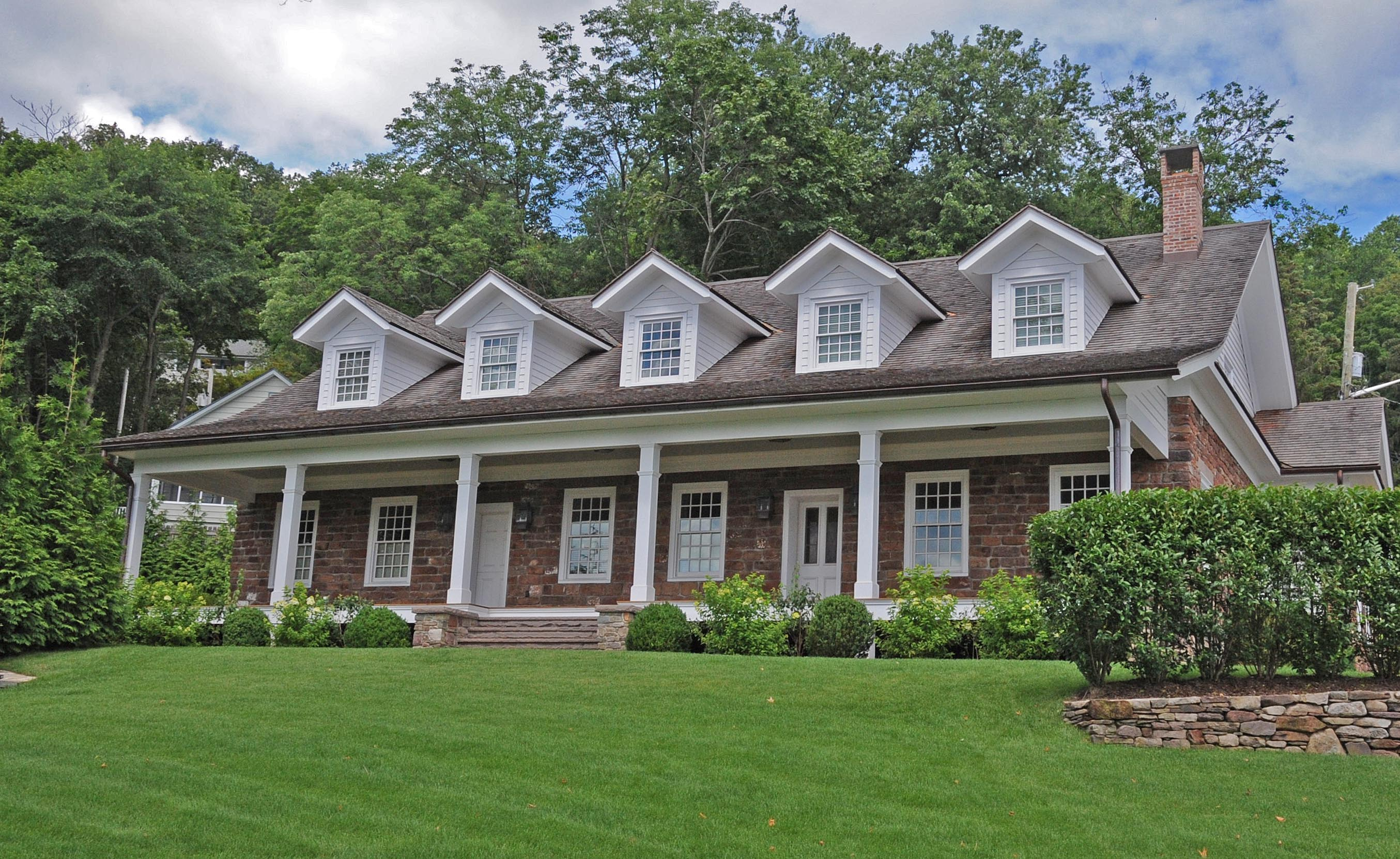
Onderdonk House

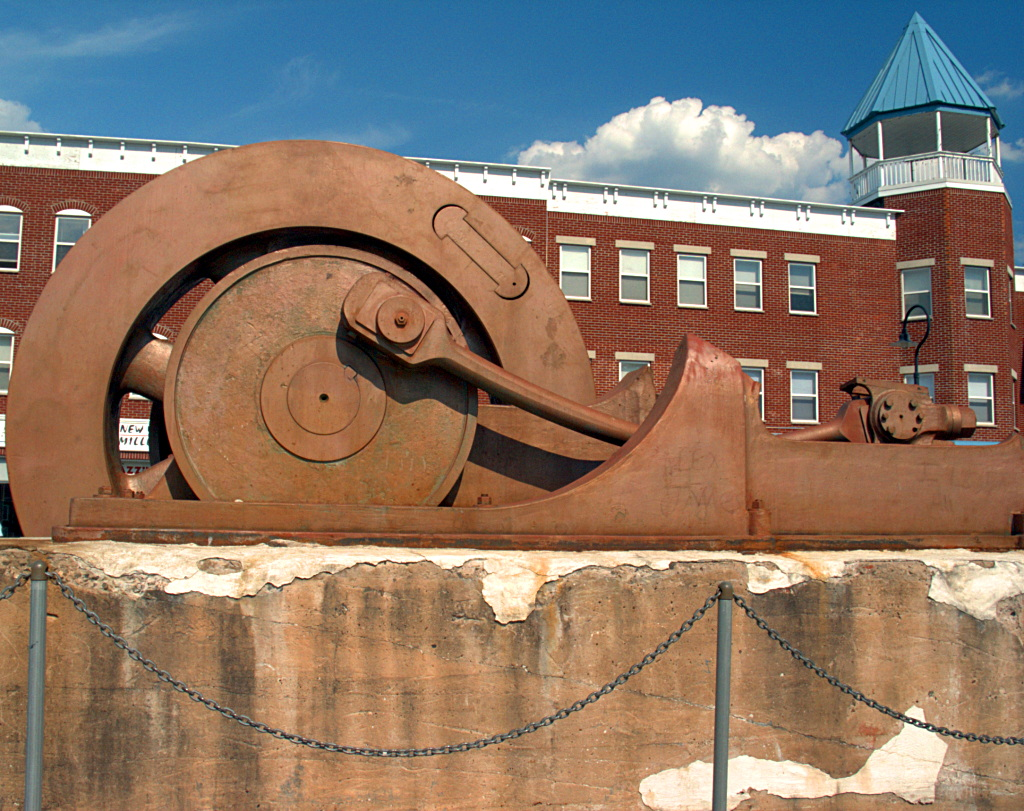
Flywheel from old factory at Flywheel Park

- Dederer Stone House or Stonehurst

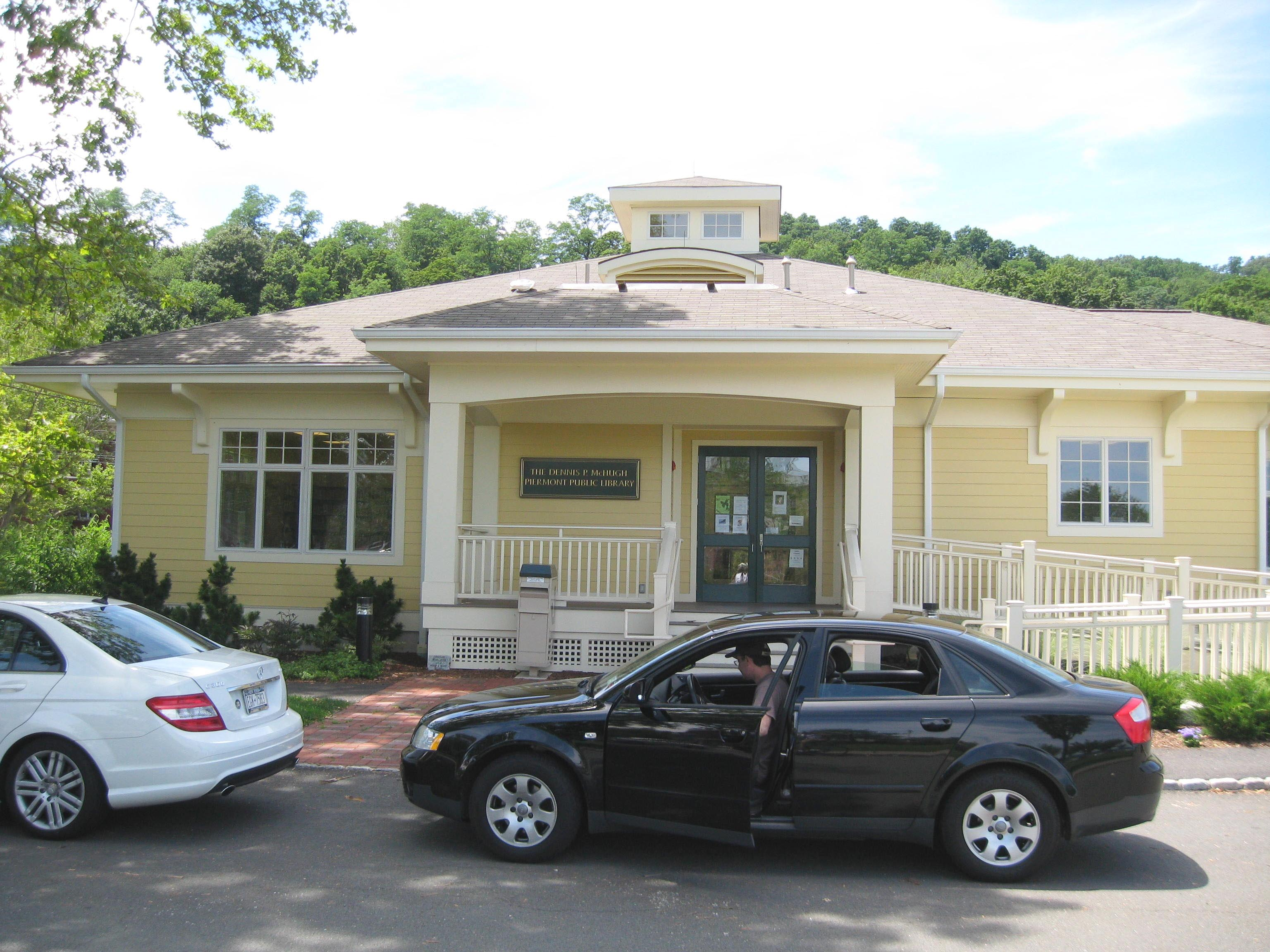
Piermont Public Library

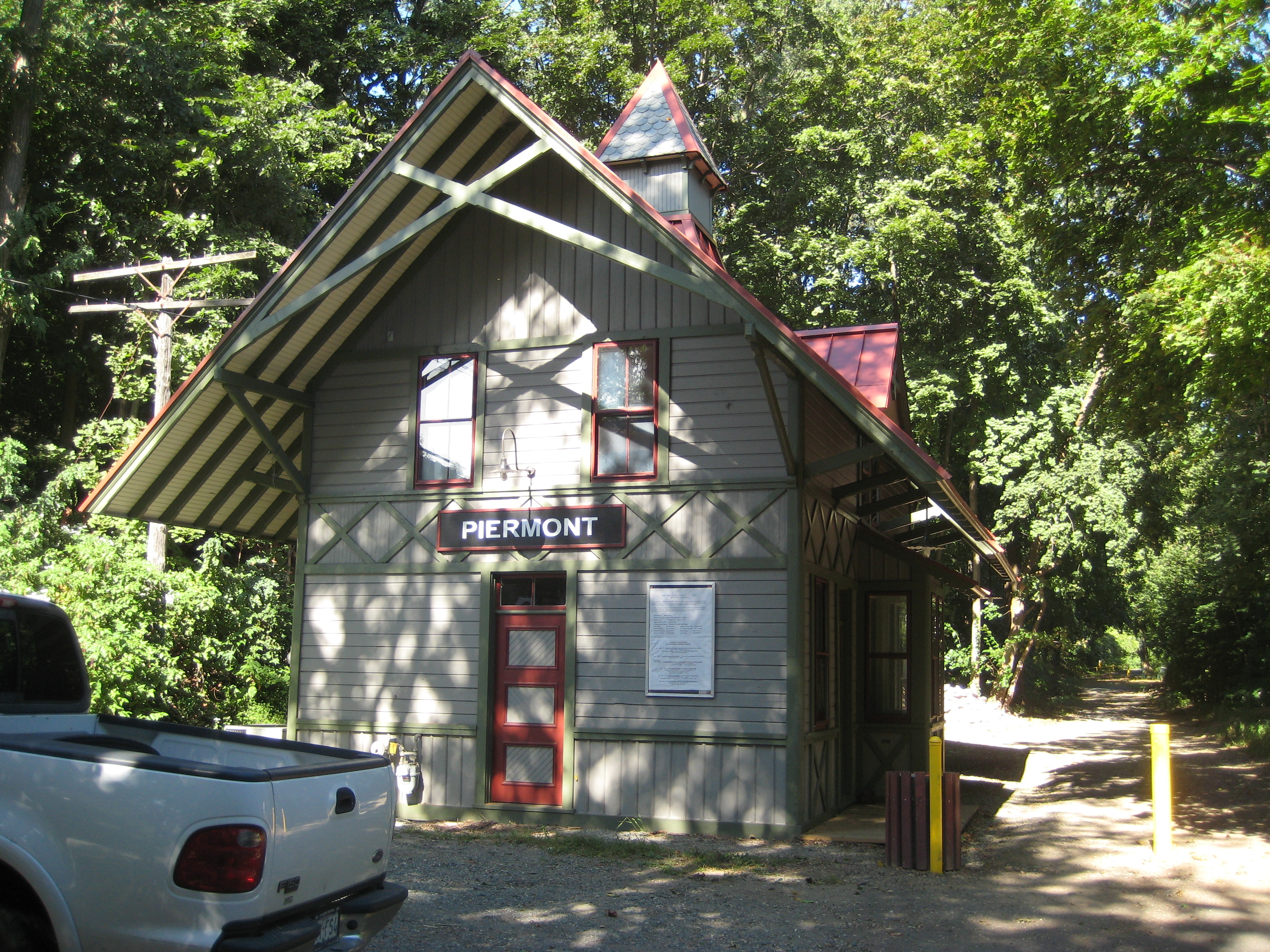
Piermont Erie Railroad station

Eleanor Stroud Park - A pond and small surrounding park next to Sparkill Creek and under the U.S. Route 9W viaduct. The park is named after a woman who lived near the pond on Ferdon Avenue. For decades she looked after the children who ice skated at the pond and served hot chocolate, coffee, hot dogs and cookies from a nearby shed. The pond is free to the public and open until 9 PM every day the green signal flag is posted.

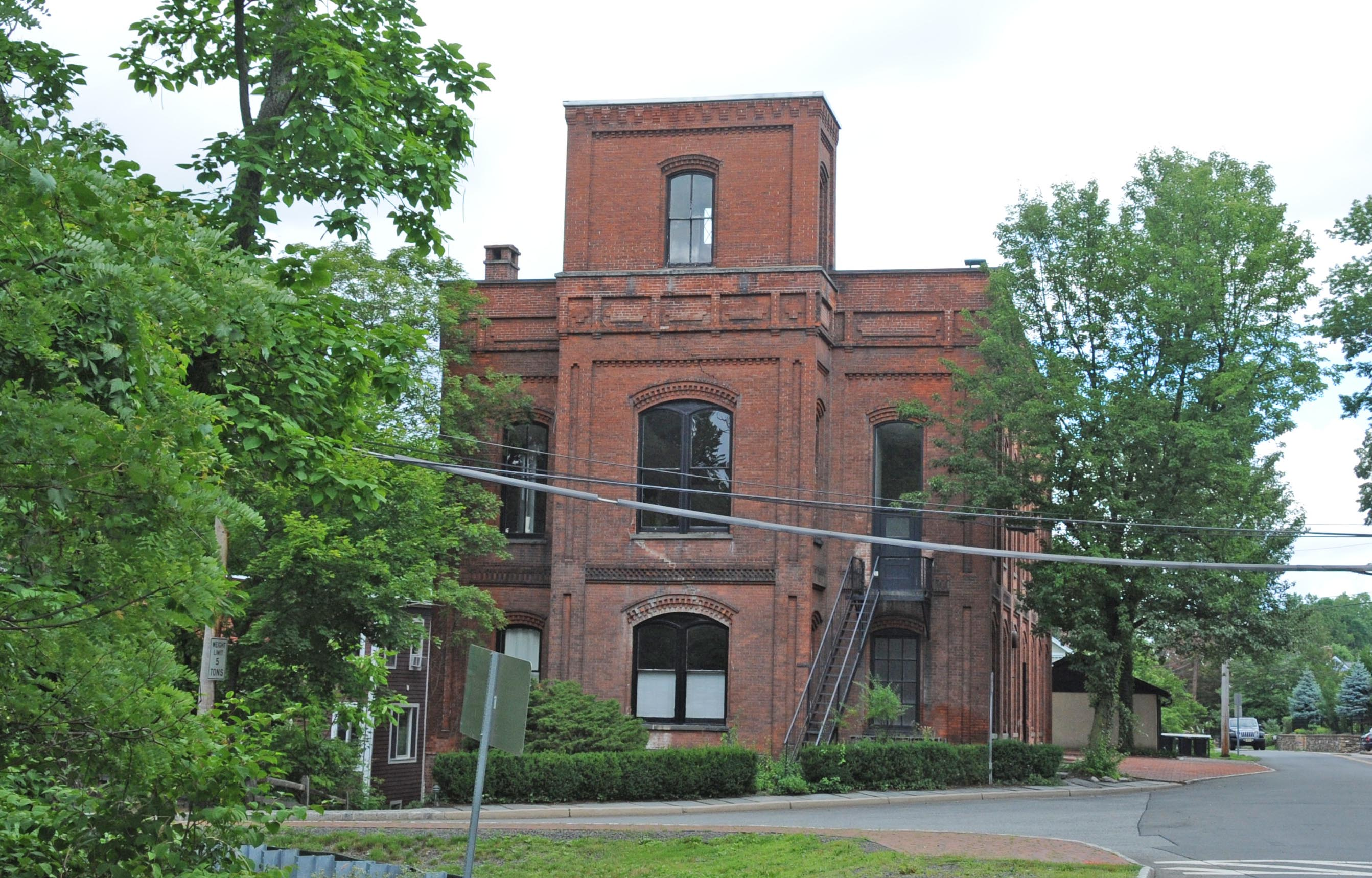
Commercial Build Built in 1875 and has been used initially as a store, then a warehouse, and finally a village hall which is still functions as

- William Ferdon House (NRHP)
- First Reformed Church (NRHP)
- Haddock's Hall - 300 Ferdon Avenue (NRHP)
- House at 352 Piermont Avenue (NRHP)
- "Last Stop USA" memorial statue that honors the soldiers that died in World War II. Piermont Pier was the area of disembarkation for soldiers heading to Europe.
- Onderdonk House - 758 Piermont Avenue (NRHP)
- Piermont Library
- Piermont Railroad Station - Ash Street (NRHP)
- The Piermont Historical Society

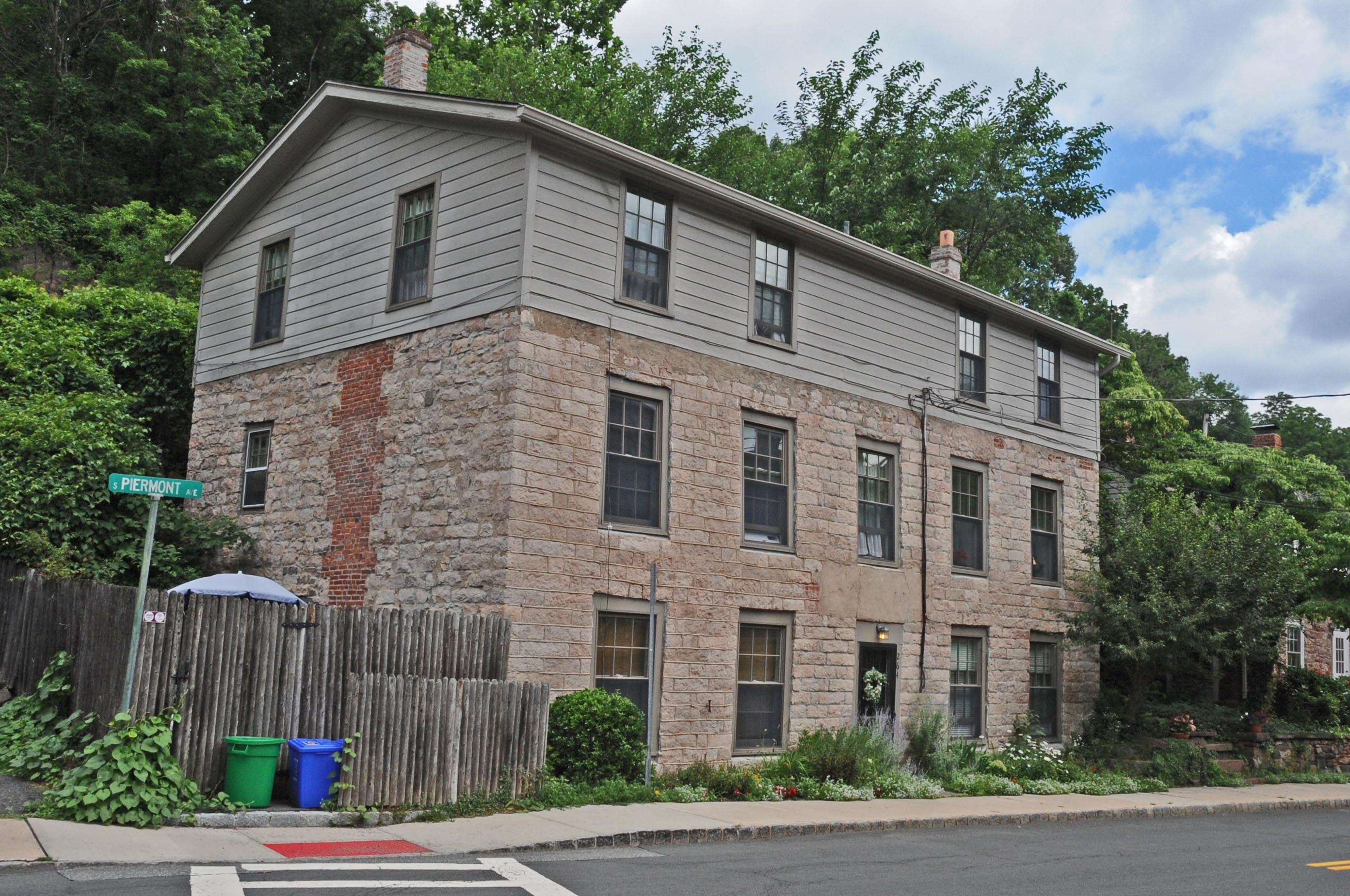
This house at 264 Piermont avenue Circa 1800 in the center of the Rockland Road Bridge District and is rumored that Aaron Burr spent The night after his fatal duel with Alexander Hamilton

- Rockland Road Bridge- between Piermont & Ferdon Avenue. (NRHP)
- Rockland Road Bridge Historic District (NRHP)
- Sneden House - 38 Paradise Avenue
- Sparkill Creek Drawbridge- Bridge Street (NRHP)
- Swamp Church - Carteret Avenue (St Charles A. M. E. Zion Church) In 1865 the black community around the Slote attended the Swamp Church at Skunk Hollow pastored by "Reverend Billy" Thompson.
