= Sparkill Creek Drawbridge =

- U.S. National Register of Historic Places
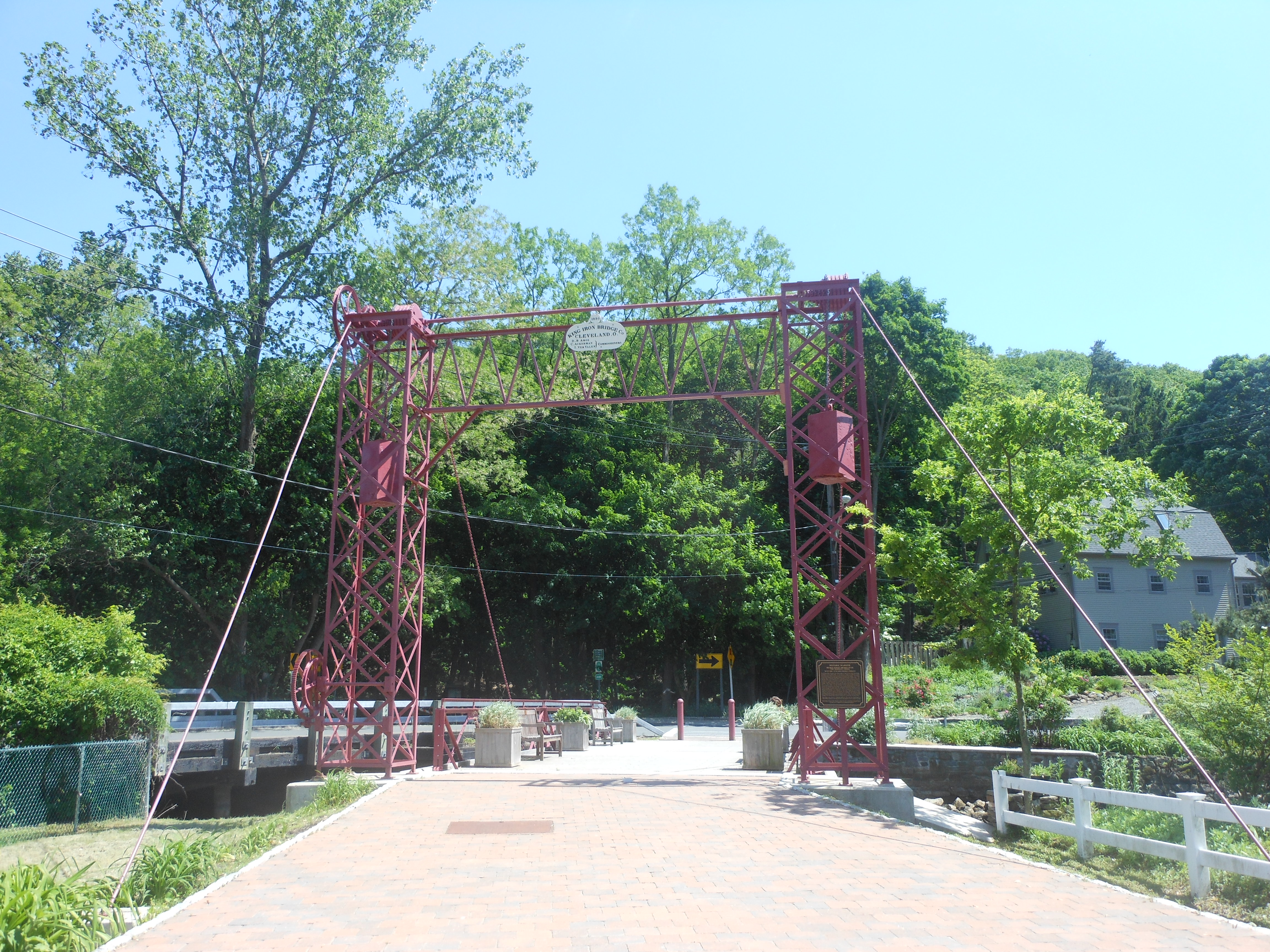
- The drawbridge in 2013

- Location within New York Location within the United States
- Location: Bridge Street over Sparkill Creek, Piermont, New York
- Coordinates: 41°2′15″N 73°54′57″W
- Area: less than one acre
- Built: 1880
- Architect: King Iron Bridge Co.
- Architectural style: Pratt Pony Truss
- NRHP reference No.: 85000658
- Added to NRHP: March 28, 1985

The Sparkill Creek Drawbridge is a historic Pratt pony truss-style drawbridge located at Piermont in Rockland County, New York. Built in 1880 by the King Iron Bridge Company of Cleveland, it is a metal single-leaf bridge. Chains can lift the bridge when an operator turns a crank, helped by counterweights. It spans Sparkill Creek, a tributary of the Hudson River.

The bridge was listed on the National Register of Historic Places in 1985 and documented by the Historic American Engineering Record in 1994. After a complete dismantling and restoration was completed in 2009 by the Rockland County Highway Department for $900,000, the structure now serves solely as a pedestrian bridge.

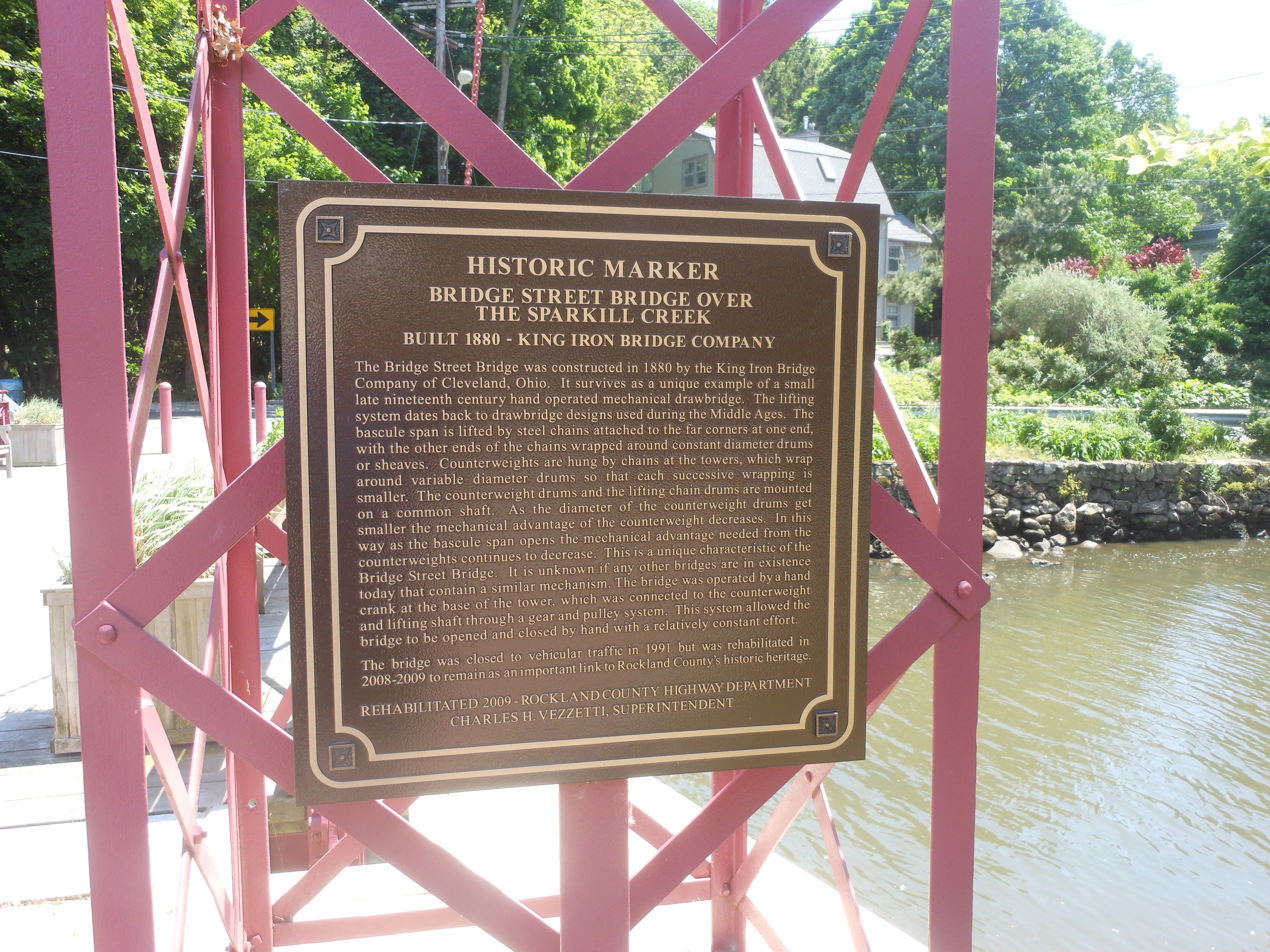
King Iron Bridge Company historic marker

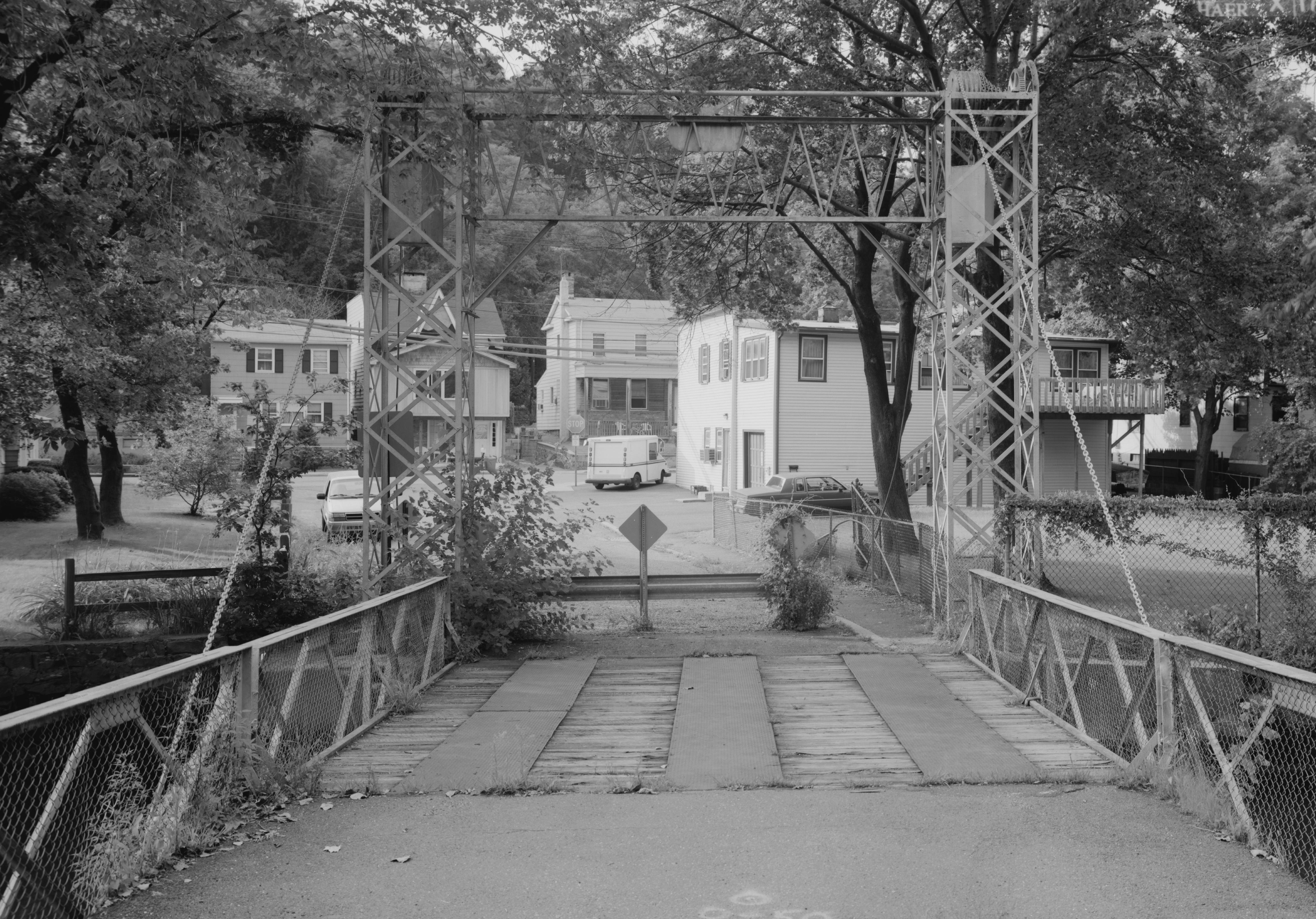
The drawbridge in 1994

== See also ==
- Rockland Road Bridge
- List of bridges documented by the Historic American Engineering Record in New York (state)
