= Onderdonk House =

Historic house in New York, United States

- U.S. National Register of Historic Places
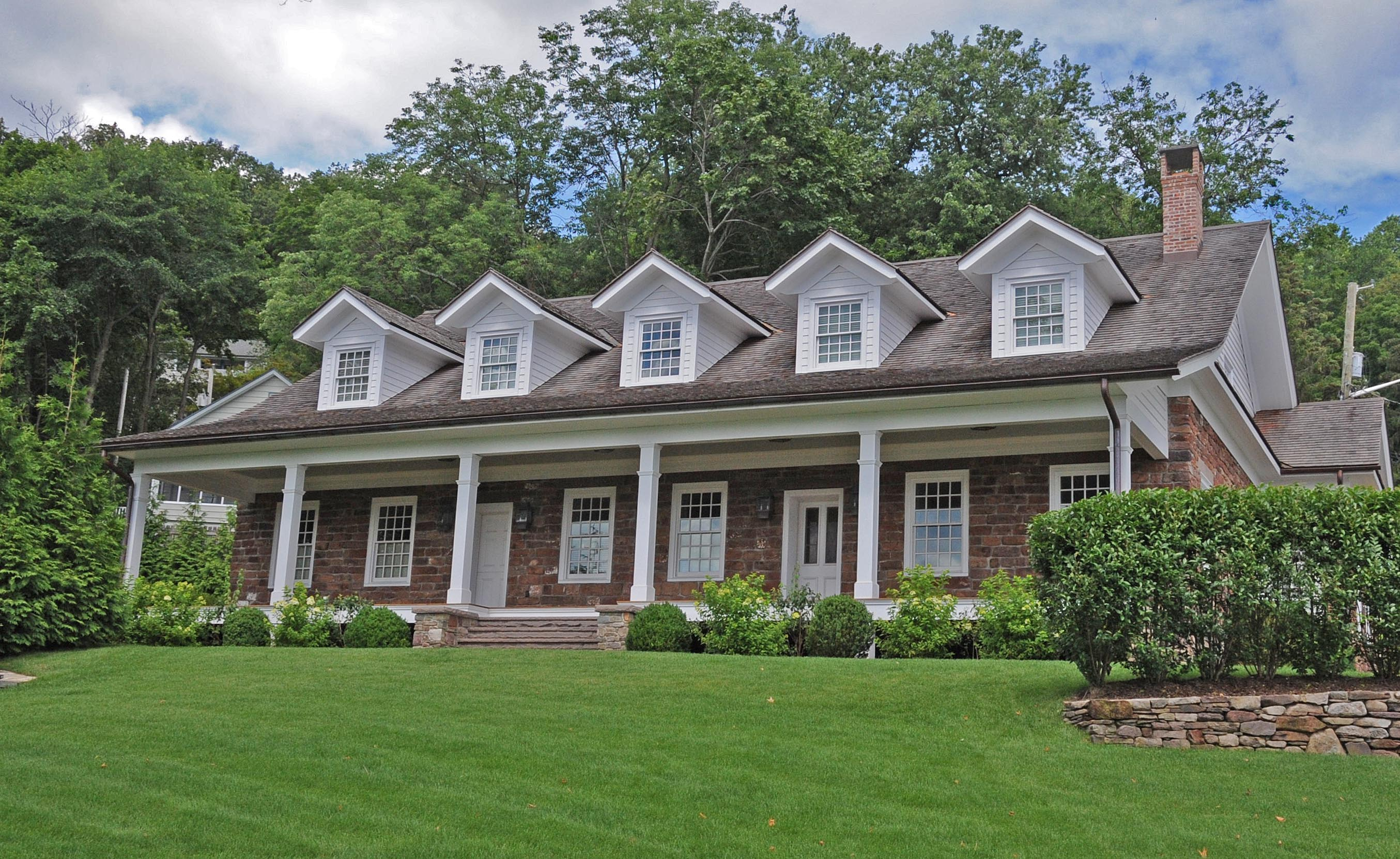
- House in 2016

- Location within New York Location within the United States
- Location: 748 Piermont Ave., Piermont, New York
- Coordinates: 41°2′51″N 73°55′9″W
- Area: 0.7 acres (0.28 ha)
- Built: 1737
- Architectural style: Colonial, Federal
- NRHP reference No.: 06000890
- Added to NRHP: September 28, 2006

Onderdonk House, also known as Haring House and Arie Smith-Onderdonk House, was a historic home located at Piermont in Rockland County, New York. It was built over three periods of construction: about 1737, about 1810, and about 1867. It consisted of a 1 1/2-story gable-roofed main block and a 1 1/2-story wing, both of sandstone construction. Also on the property was a 1 1/2-story frame dwelling built about 1840.

It was listed on the National Register of Historic Places in 2006.

It was demolished on May 22, 2013.

According to local residents, the new owners preserved the stone and various other portions of the historical structure, and planned to rebuild the exterior in the old footprint and as close to the historical facade as possible. In fact, the new home is a similar design, but has a larger footprint than the original and the ceilings of both floors were raised so that the entire structure is much larger.
