= House at 352 Piermont Avenue =

Historic house in New York, United States

- U.S. National Register of Historic Places
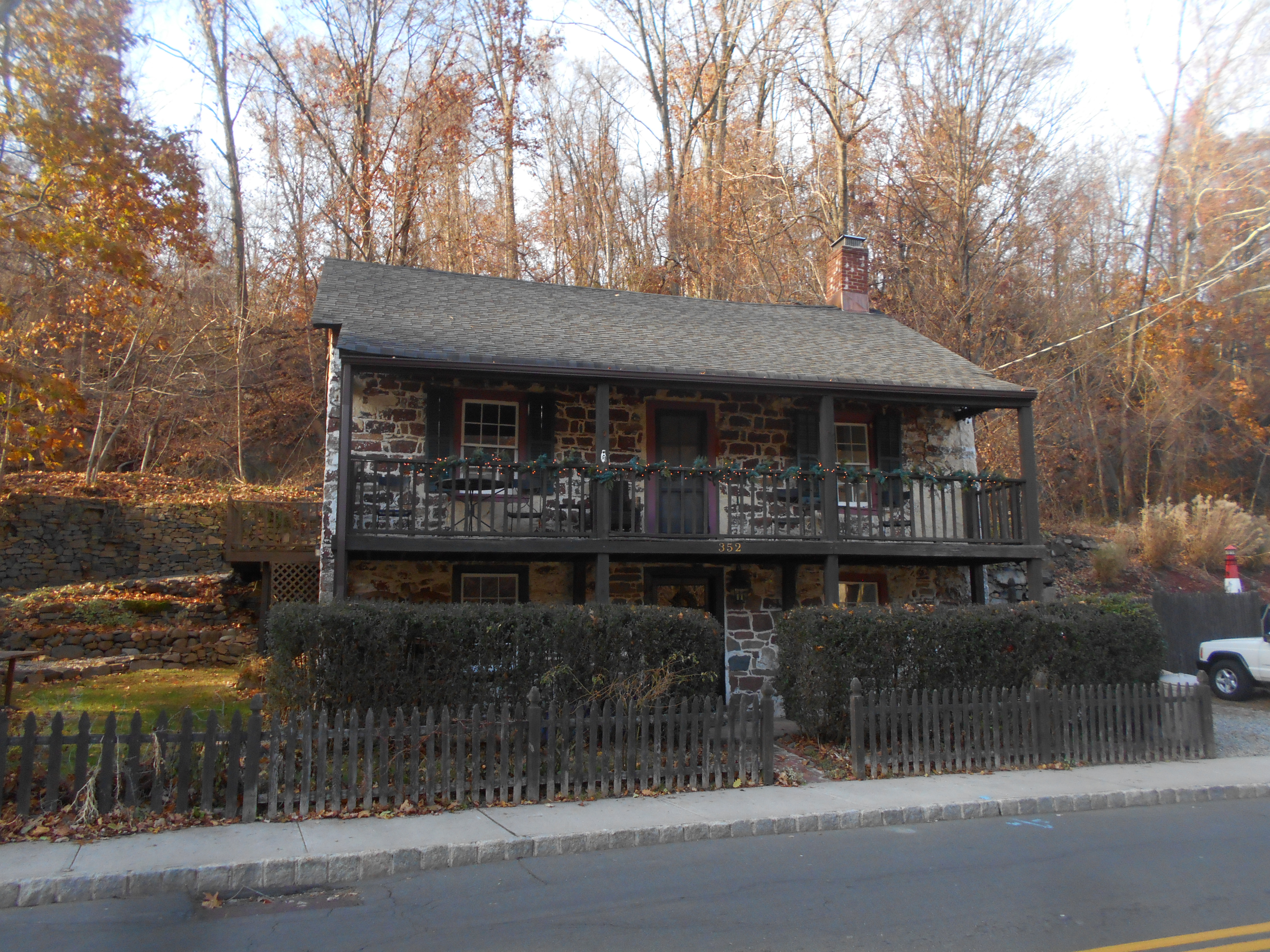
- House at 352 Piermont Avenue, November 2014

- Location within New York Location within the United States
- Location: 352 Piermont Ave., Piermont, New York
- Coordinates: 41°02′13″N 73°55′11″W
- Area: 0.9 acres (0.36 ha)
- Built: c. 1780
- Architectural style: Colonial
- NRHP reference No.: 14001218
- Added to NRHP: January 27, 2015

House at 352 Piermont Avenue is a historic home located at Piermont, Rockland County, New York. It was built about 1780, and is a 2 1/2-story, side-gabled, sandstone Colonial period residence. A two-story frame addition was built about 1970. The house features a two-story, full-facade replacement porch.

It was listed on the National Register of Historic Places in 2015.
