= First Reformed Church (Piermont, New York) =

Historic church in New York, United States

- U.S. National Register of Historic Places
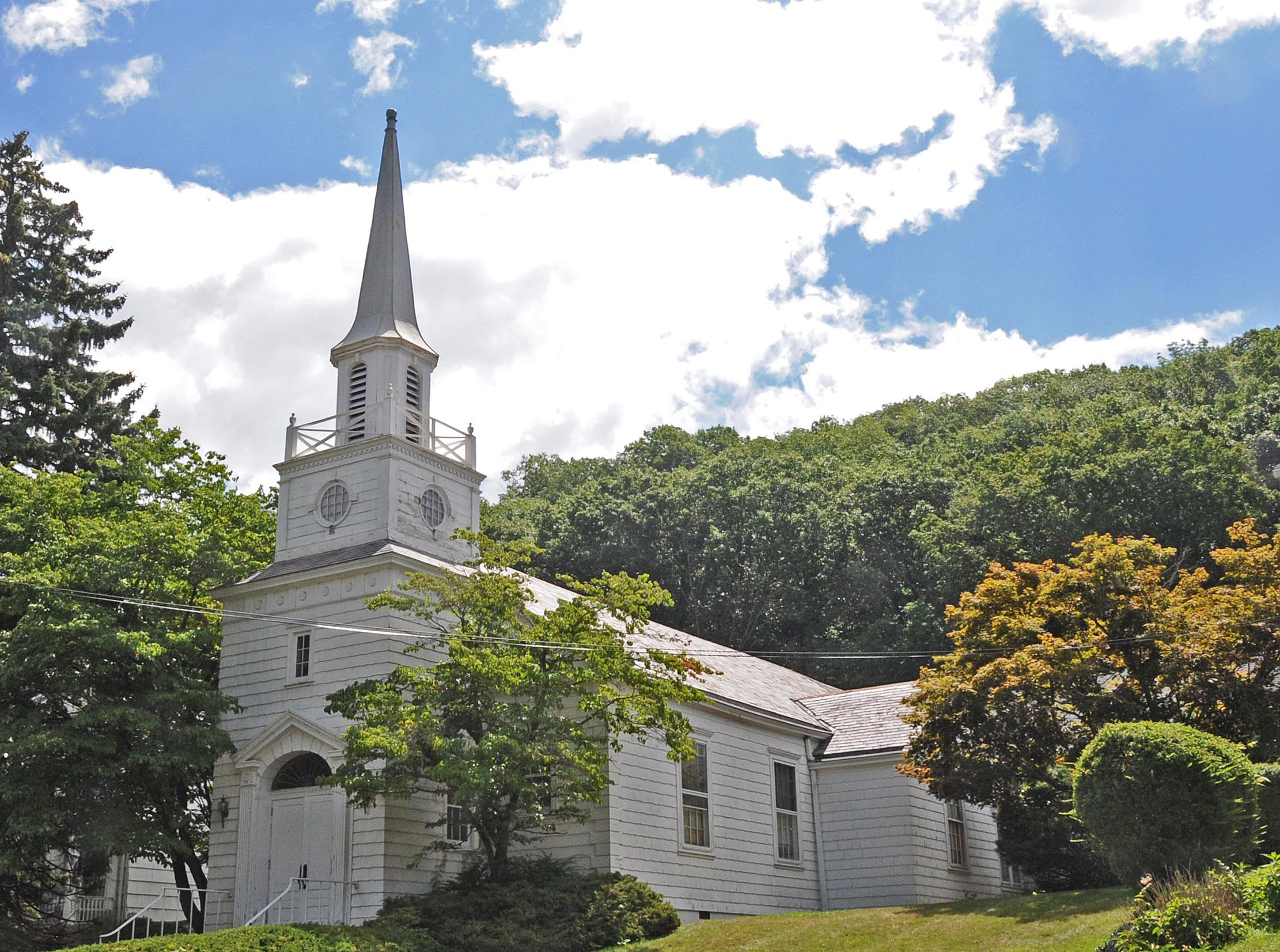

- Location within New York Location within the United States
- Location: 361 Ferdon Avenue, Piermont, New York
- Coordinates: 41°02′11″N 73°55′01″W
- Area: 1.33 acres (0.54 ha)
- Built: 1946, 1952
- Architect: Cherry & Matz
- Architectural style: Colonial Revival
- NRHP reference No.: 15000777
- Added to NRHP: November 9, 2015

First Reformed Church, also known as Piermont Reformed Church and First Protestant Dutch Church of Piermont, is a historic Reformed Church in America church located at Piermont, Rockland County, New York. It was built in 1946, and is a one-story, three-bay by four-bay, Wren-Gibbs Colonial Revival style church. It features a central square tower topped by a hexagonal steeple. Attached to the church is a side-gabled, I-shaped parish hall, completed in 1952. Also on the property is the contributing parsonage (c. 1860). Organized in 1839, it is home to oldest congregation in Piermont.

It was listed on the National Register of Historic Places in 2015.
