= Piermont station =

Piermont
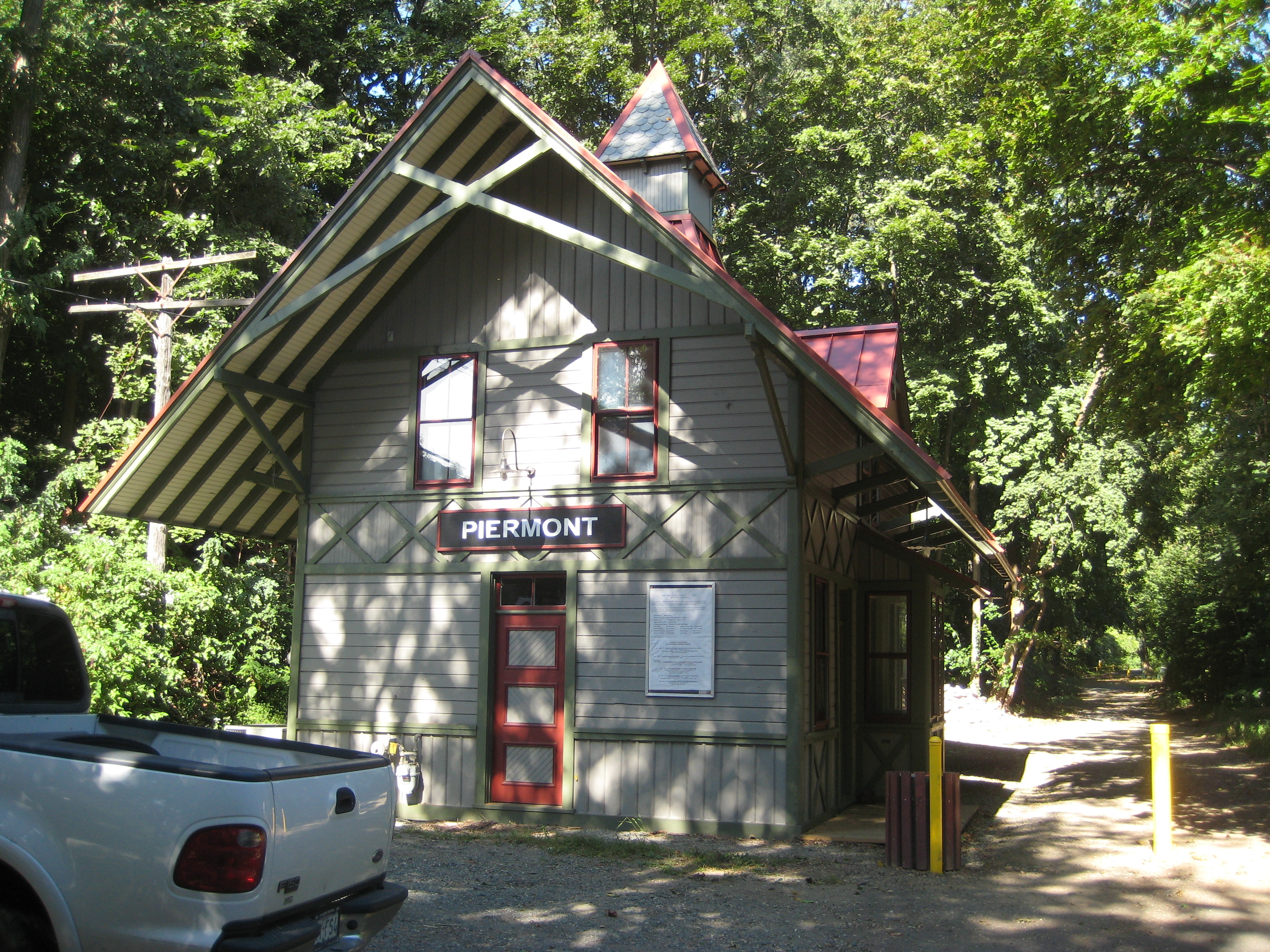
- The former station depot at Piermont as seen in 2009, with the tracks for the Northern Branch removed

General information
- Location: 50 Ash Street, Piermont, New York 10968
- Coordinates: 41.04152°N 73.91837°W
- Owner: Village of Piermont
- Line: Northern Branch
- Platforms: 1 side platform
- Tracks: removed

Other information
- Station code: 2007 (Erie Railroad)

History
- Opened: May 21, 1870
- Closed: December 14, 1965
- Rebuilt: 2008 (restored)

Former services
Preceding station	Erie Railroad	Following station
Grand View toward Nyack	Northern Branch	Sparkill toward Jersey City
- Piermont Railroad Station
- U.S. National Register of Historic Places
- Location within New York Location within the United States
- Location: 50 Ash St., Piermont, New York
- Coordinates: 41°2′38″N 73°55′9″W
- Area: less than one acre
- Built: 1883
- Architectural style: Stick/eastlake
- NRHP reference No.: 08001146
- Added to NRHP: December 3, 2008
Location

Piermont Railroad Station is a historic train station located at Piermont in Rockland County, New York. It was built about 1873 by the Northern Railroad of New Jersey, later acquired by the Erie Railroad. It is a 1 1/2-story, light frame building above a stone foundation. It features Stick Style exterior siding and a Late Victorian interior.

It was listed on the National Register of Historic Places in 2008.

The station is owned by the Village of Piermont. It is maintained by the Piermont Historical Society which has raised funds for and completed a structural and exterior restoration. The restoration included replacing the missing cupola and roof support timbers. Exterior paint colors were selected based on a period newspaper article describing the then new station. Interior renovations are underway. The station is open to the public on selected dates.

An earlier station at Piermont, no longer in existence, was located on the Piermont Branch, which was originally the main line of the New York and Erie Railroad opened in 1841. It was located on the east side of Piermont Avenue about 200 feet (61 m) north of Paradise Avenue. As early as 1868 it had only one passenger train a day in each direction.

The opening of Pavonia Terminal in Jersey City, New Jersey, constructed from 1886 to 1889, diverted most of the Erie Railroad traffic southward. By 1892 the Piermont station was for freight only. The 1916 station list does not show it at all.

Passenger service ended on December 14, 1965 when the Erie Lackawanna Railroad truncated service from Nyack to Sparkill. The railway's right-of-way has been converted into the Old Erie Path multi-use rail trail.
