= Blauvelt State Park =

State park in Rockland County, New York

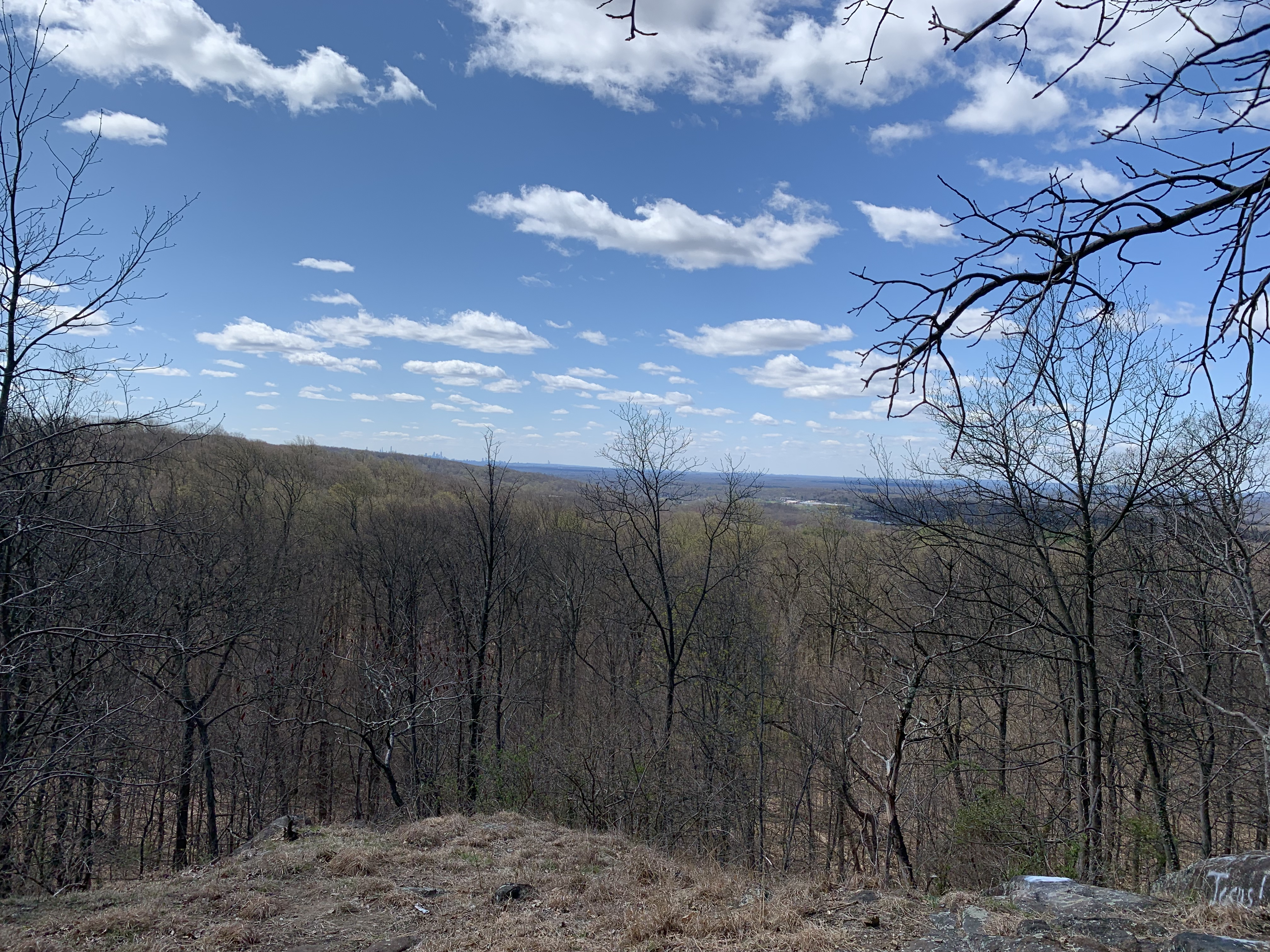

- Location within New York
- Interactive map of Blauvelt State Park
- Type: State park (undeveloped)
- Location: Greenbush Road; Blauvelt, New York
- Nearest city: Nyack, New York
- Coordinates: 41°04′48″N 73°56′15″W
- Area: 644 acres (2.61 km^{2})
- Operator: Palisades Interstate Park Commission; New York State Office of Parks, Recreation and Historic Preservation
- Visitors: 36,579 (in 2020)
- Open: All year
- Website: Blauvelt State Park

Blauvelt State Park is a 644-acre (2.61 km^{2}) undeveloped state park located in the Town of Orangetown in Rockland County, New York, near the Hudson River Palisades. The park's land occupies the site of the former Camp Bluefields, a rifle range used to train members of the New York National Guard prior to World War I. The park is located south of Nyack.

== History ==
Prior to becoming Blauvelt State Park, the property was known as Camp Bluefields, a large rifle range used primarily to train members of the New York National Guard. The rifle range occupied 335 acres (1.36 km^{2}) of land and was touted in 1910 as being the largest in the country. The range's location was criticized almost immediately, and complaints of stray bullets being encountered in nearby residential areas were registered even before the range's official completion. The rifle range operated from soon after the state's initial purchase of the land in 1909 until its administration was transferred to the Palisades Interstate Park Commission in 1913.

In the years that followed, Camp Bluefields was used as a YWCA summer camp for New York City working women, an ROTC training camp, a Columbia University summer camp, and as a destination for participants in the Fresh Air Fund. In 1930, the camp resumed military use by the U.S. Army, who used the property for training programs that year. In 1942, soldiers from Camp Shanks used the property as a training grounds, and it was used as an air raid post during World War II.

The adjacent Clausland Mountain County Park is the former home of a Nike missile launch site. During the Cold War the site was part of a ring of Nike surface-to-air missiles surrounding New York City, intended to defend the city from Soviet bombers.

== Park description ==
Blauvelt State Park is a largely undeveloped park with no facilities other than hiking trails and limited parking. The park links with several other town and county parks, including Clausland Mountain County Park, Buttermilk Falls County Park, Tackamack Park and Schuyler/Bradley Town Park, creating a largely seamless park range on the Hudson Palisades.

The park offers several outlooks over the Hudson River and the Tappan Zee. The Long Path, a hiking trail linking Fort Lee, New Jersey to the Adirondacks of New York, travels through the park.

Ruins of Camp Bluefield's long-abandoned rifle range, including tunnels that connected down-range targets to the firing line, are also visible within the park.

== See also ==
- List of New York state parks
