= Piermont Branch =

Railroad line

- Map

Overview
- Other name: Suffern Industrial Track
- Status: Active (Suffern to Tallman)
- Owner: Norfolk Southern
- Locale: Rockland County, New York
- Termini: Piermont; Suffern

Service
- Type: Freight rail
- System: NS
- Operator(s): NS, NJT (MTA)

Technical
- Number of tracks: 1-2
- Track gauge: 4 ft 8 1/2 in (1,435 mm)

The Erie Railroad Piermont Branch was a rail branch line that was formed from the easternmost portion of the original main line of the Erie. It ran from Suffern, New York to Piermont, New York.

== Route ==
The line, originally the Erie's main line from 1841 to 1858, began at the Piermont Pier, where steamboats ran to New York City. It then ran to Sparkill, where it connected with the Northern Branch. After this, it ran northwest to Nanuet, where it connected with what is now the NJ Transit Pascack Valley Line. It then ran through Monsey and Tallman, then turned north in Suffern.

== Remnants ==
The line terminated at Franklin Street in Nyack.
