= Tappan Zee High School =

Public high school in New York, United States

Tappan Zee High School (TZHS)

Location
- 15 Dutch Hill Road; Orangeburg, New York 10962; United States; 41°02′57″N 73°57′15″W

Information
- Established: 1965
- School district: South Orangetown Central School District
- Teaching staff: 88.71 (on an FTE basis)
- Grades: 9-12
- Enrollment: 911 (as of 2024-2035)
- Student to teacher ratio: 10.27
- Colors: Red and White
- Athletics: Section 1 (NYSPHSAA)
- Mascot: "Zee"
- Team name: Flying Dutchmen

Tappan Zee High School is a public high school located in Orangeburg, New York in Rockland County. The school serves students in grades 9–12, and is part of the South Orangetown Central School District. The school derives its name from the nearby Tappan Zee section of the Hudson River.

The school draws students from Orangetown, New York, which comprises the villages and hamlets of Blauvelt, Grandview, Orangeburg, Tappan, Palisades, Piermont, Upper Grandview, Sparkill, and portions of South Nyack.

As of the 2021–22 school year, the school had an enrollment of 945 students and 89.6 classroom teachers (on an FTE basis), for a student–teacher ratio of 10.66:1. There were 144 students (15.2% of enrollment) eligible for free lunch, and 21 (2.2% of students) eligible for reduced-cost lunch. In 2006, the school dedicated new athletic fields and tennis courts, including an artificial turf football/lacrosse field and track. In 2019, the school replaced the artificial turf field that was installed in 2006 with a newer, more environmentally friendly, turf.

The principal is Melissa Luciano.

== Athletics ==
Tappan Zee High School has teams in numerous sports.

=== Fall teams ===
- Cross Country (varsity, girls' and boys' teams)
- Football (junior varsity (JV) and varsity, only boys' teams)
- Soccer (JV and varsity, girls' and boys' teams)
- Swimming (varsity, only girls' team with boys' team in winter)
- Tennis (JV and varsity, only girls' teams with boys' team in spring)
- Volleyball (JV and varsity, only girls' teams)
- Cheerleading (varsity, coed)

=== Winter teams ===
- Basketball (Freshman, JV, and varsity boys' teams, JV and varsity girls' teams)
- Bowling (varsity, girls' and boys' teams)
- Fencing (JV and varsity for épée and foil, girls' and boys' teams)
- Ice hockey (JV and varsity)
- Skiing (intramural, boys' and girls' teams)
- Swimming (varsity, only boys' team with girls' team in fall)
- Indoor Track & Field (varsity)
- Wrestling (JV and varsity, only boys' teams)
- Cheerleading (varsity, coed)

=== Spring teams ===
- Baseball (JV and varsity)
- Golf (varsity)
- Lacrosse (JV and varsity, girls' and boys' teams)
- Softball (JV and varsity)
- Tennis (JV and varsity, only boys' team with girls' team in fall)
- Outdoor Track & Field (varsity)

In addition to playing on a team, junior and senior varsity athletes can join VAASA, Varsity Athletes Against Substance Abuse.

== Notable alumni ==
- Salman Ahmad, musician
- Neil Berg, composer/lyricist
- Alan Jacobs, film director, screenwriter and producer
- Brian Jagde, opera performer
- Luba Mason (born 1960), actress, singer, songwriter, and dancer
- Brian O'Connell (born 1963), musician
- Hayden Panettiere, actress
- Michael Rispoli (born 1960), character actor who appeared in The Sopranos as Jackie Aprile, Sr.
- Michael Salzhauer (born 1972), plastic surgeon
- Brooke Smith, actress
- Blaise Winter (born 1962), NFL player

== Notable faculty ==
- Alen Hadzic, coach of the boys and girls varsity fencing team, and fencer; in 2023, Hadzic was banned from fencing and coaching fencing in the US for life by SafeSport, due to his sexual misconduct.
