= SOCSD =

SOCSD may refer to:

- Sibley-Ocheyedan Community School District - Iowa
- South Orangetown Central School District - New York
- Starkville Oktibbeha Consolidated School District - Mississippi
