= The '76 House =

Historic commercial building in New York, US

- U.S. National Register of Historic Places
- U.S. Historic district – Contributing property
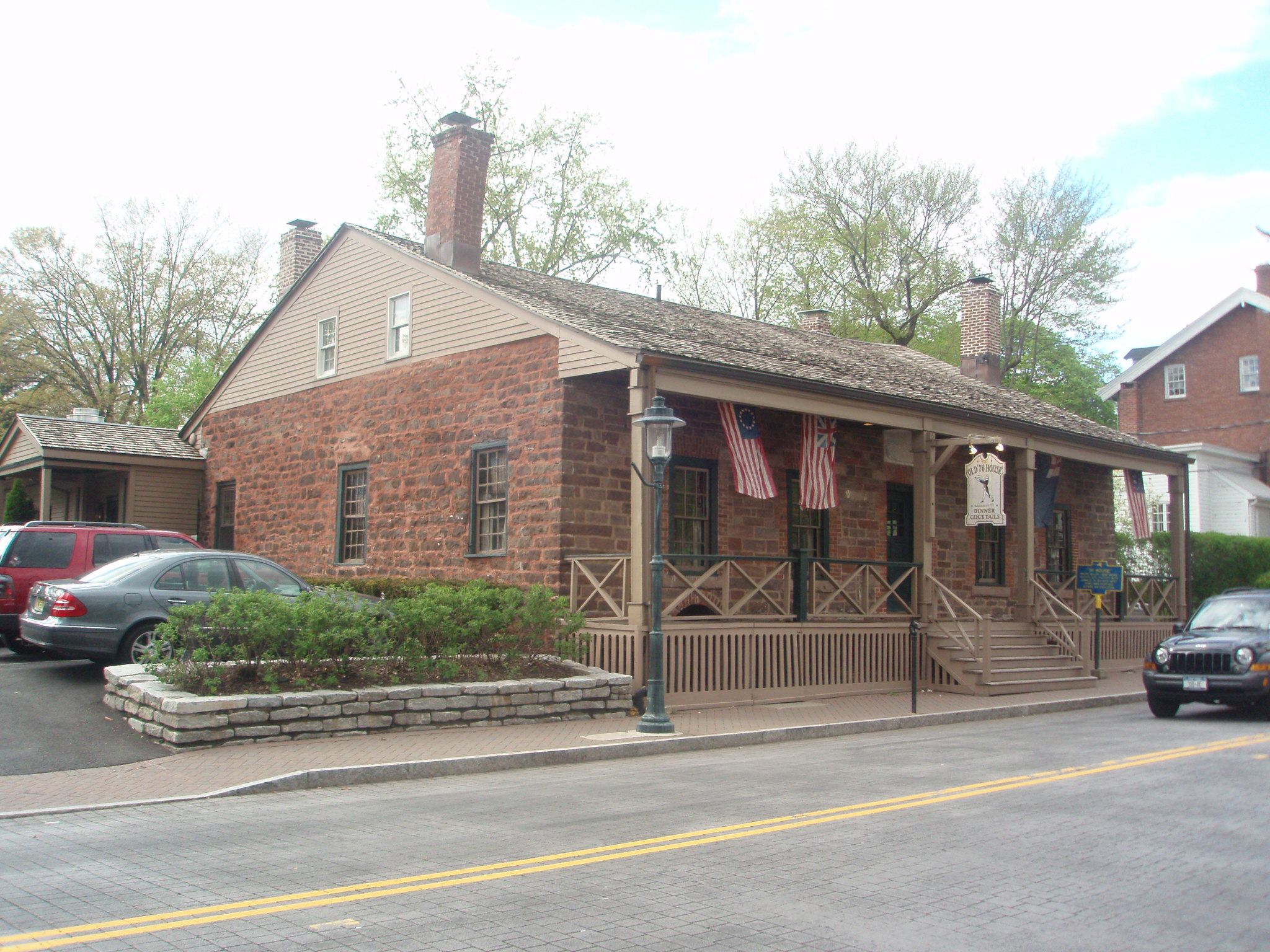
- The Old 76 House (2010)

- Location within New York Location within the United States
- Location: 110 Main St, Tappan, New York
- Coordinates: 41°1′18″N 73°56′52″W
- Part of: Tappan Historic District
- NRHP reference No.: 90000689

The '76 House, also known as the Old '76 House, is a Colonial-era structure built as a home and tavern in Tappan, New York, in 1754 by Casparus Mabie, a merchant and tavern-keeper.

== History ==
=== Origin ===
In spite of local claims of much earlier construction (dating to founding of Tappan in 1686), the '76 House appears only to predate the American Revolution by several decades. The earliest confirmed dates concerning any structure on or near the site involve one Antie Myers, a widow, who was licensed in 1705 to sell drink, "as per her recognizance," in her house in the immediate neighborhood of today's '76 House. After her death around 1721 her home was purchased by Yoast Mabie, a brother of Casparus. The house was demolished in 1835. In 1753, Casparus Mabie bought a piece of land from Cornelis Myers, Antie's son.

The following year he built a house on this lot on what was to become Main Street in Tappan. He included space for a tavern, probably no more than a few tables and benches in a corner of the front room. Two years later, in 1756, court records indicate that the "Supervisors for the County of Orange [met] at the House of Casparus Maybe, in Orange Town October the 5th Anno Domine 1756." These documents describe meetings of the Board of Supervisors over the years and provide details of the food and ale they consumed and the business they conducted.

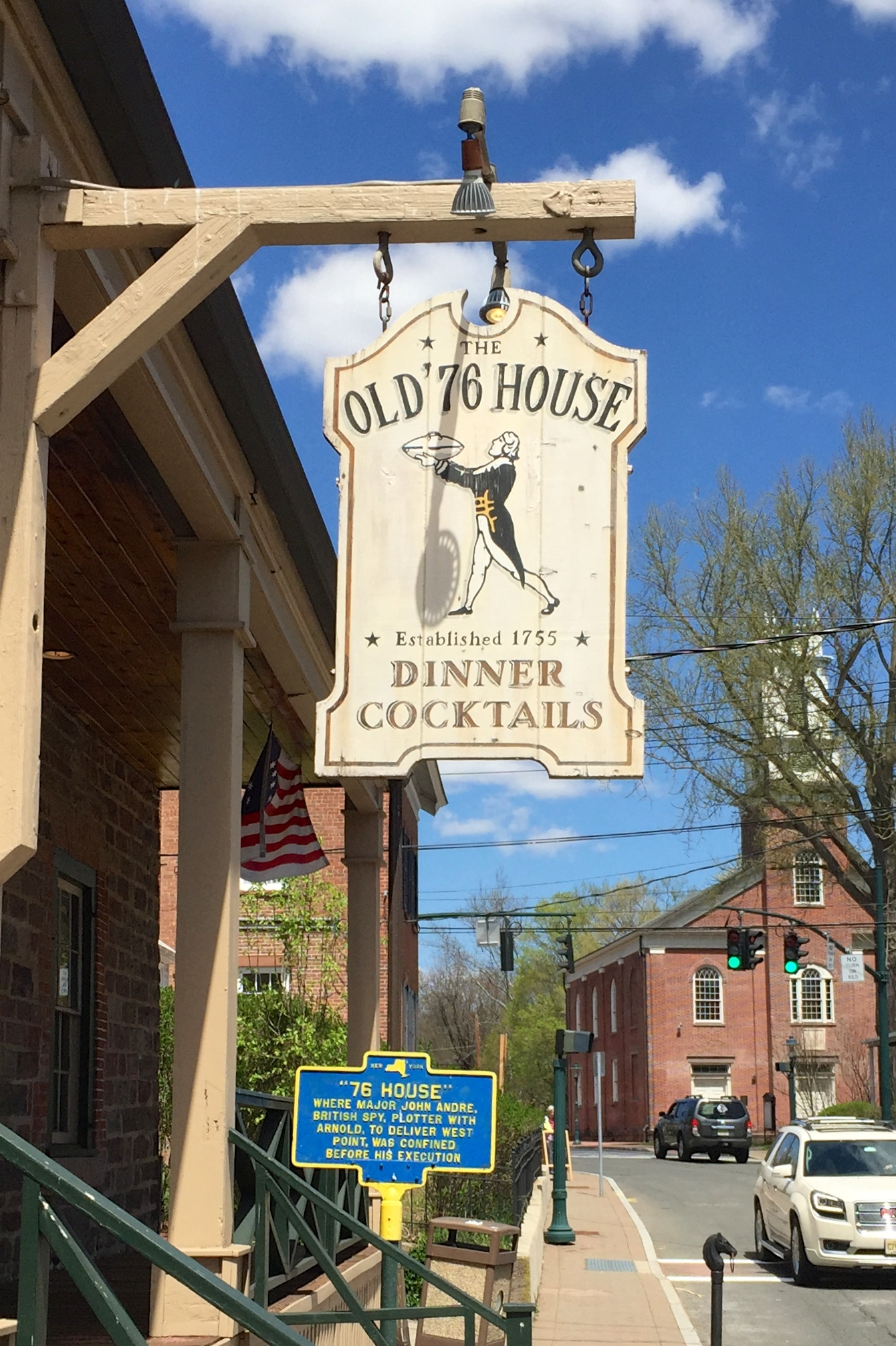
The Old '76 House, established 1755 – '76 House, where Major John André was confined

An old hearsay that the '76 House was known as "Mabie's Inn", home to Yoast Mabie, and the site of the signing of the Orangetown Resolutions in 1774, has been disproved by historians. Mabie's actual house, around the corner, was demolished.

=== Revolutionary headquarters ===
The '76 House was often used during the American Revolutionary War as a meeting place for local Patriots. For a few days in 1780, it served as the prison of the Revolution's most notorious spy, Major John André. When the Continental Army encamped in Tappan, the house was the headquarters for General Nathanael Greene. By this time, owner Casparus Mabie had built another house for his family on "very good upland" behind the '76 House on what is today called André Hill, where the spy was hanged after his trial in the Tappan Reformed Church. General George Washington did not attend the trial, nor did he "question" André, as some sources claim. In fact, Washington did not respond to the spy's request that he be shot as befitted a gentleman and an officer rather than hanged like a common criminal.

As the war continued, Fort Lee in New Jersey and New York City were British strongholds, West Point was a Revolutionary stronghold, and Tappan became a front line in the conflict. George Washington made the nearby DeWint House his headquarters. Once again, despite local claims, there is no documentary evidence that he ever drank or ate at the '76 House. He brought his own chef to Tappan with him, Samuel Fraunces of Fraunces Tavern. Nor is there evidence that he met the British Commander Carleton at the '76 House at the end of the war. The dinner they had together in Tappan was at the De Wint House, prepared by Fraunces, and another aboard the H.M.S. Perseverance.

=== Restoration ===
In 1987, Rob Norden purchased the restaurant, which is now owned and operated by his son, also Rob. The Nordens undertook a significant research and restoration project to restore the older appearance and deal with structural problems. The foundation was strengthened with concrete. The floor and ceiling joists, weakened by sagging of the foundation, were replaced by others from a barn in Ontario as old as the tavern, and the floorboards were replaced with similar boards from a schoolhouse in Pennsylvania. The '76 House is a contributing property to the Tappan Historic District.

== Today ==
Several scenes from "College", the fifth episode of The Sopranos first season, were shot at the Old 76 House, as were several scenes from the movie Stepmom starring Susan Sarandon and Julia Roberts.

== See also ==
- List of the oldest buildings in New York
- Reformed Church of Tappan
- Tappan Historic District
- The Burton Store
