= Burton Store =

Historic commercial building in New York, United States

- The Burton Store
- U.S. Historic district – Contributing property
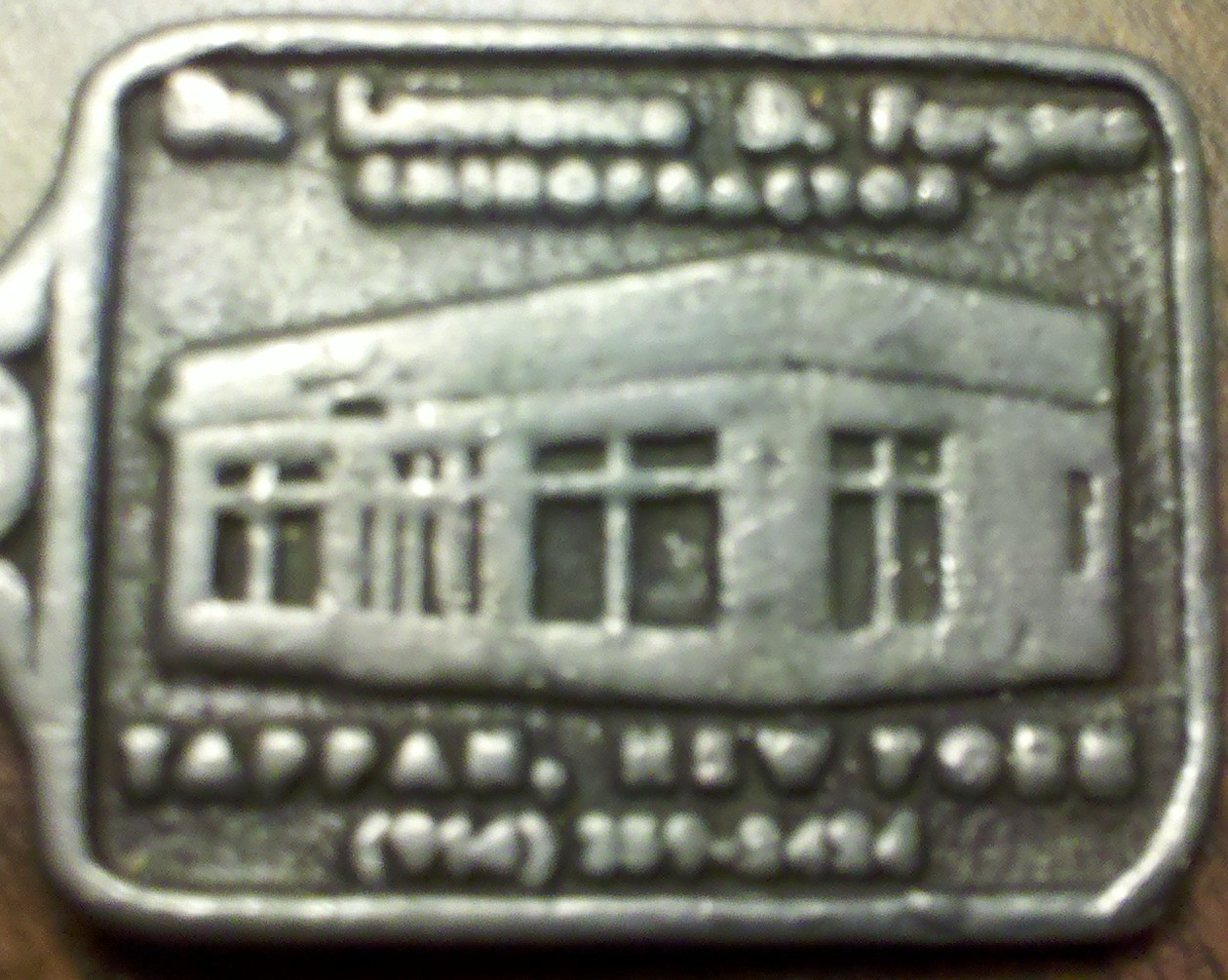
- Keychain bearing stylized image of the Burton Store

- Location within New York Location within the United States
- Location: 19 Old Tappan Road, Tappan, New York 10983
- Coordinates: 41°1′19.5″N 73°56′52.2″W
- Built: 1912-1914
- Architectural style: Colonial Revival
- Part of: Tappan Historic District (ID90000689)

The Burton Store is a historic building in Tappan, New York, located within the bounds of the Tappan Historic District. Once functioning as Tappan's general store, it has been occupied since 1985 by chiropractor Lawrence Forgacs' Tappan Professional Center. The Burton Store is one of two buildings in the district constructed in the Colonial Revival style, the other being the nearby Borcher's Stable, located at 2 Oak Tree Road just beyond The Old 76 House. This was the last building phase during the period of significance in the early twentieth century as recognized by the Tappan Historic District. It is located adjacent to The Old 76 House and across the street from The Manse Barn. The Burton Store is described by Alicia A. Jettner in the National Register of Historic Places as follows:

"This is a large one-story flat-roofed building with narrow clapboard siding and details in the Colonial Revival mode. Glazed double doors are flanked by large transom and side lights. On both sides of the entrance are paired store windows with panels below. The dropped cornice has a denticulated frieze with triglyphs similar to those of the mid-1830 buildings in the district. It was originally called "The Apartment House" and stood approximately one block west of its present location. It was moved in the early 1920s and became the grocery store of Burton & Sons. It had restoration work done in 1982-1983. There is a large, contributing one story clapboard-sided shed, which stands to the south of this building. It is almost the same length as the Burton Store and one room deep. This building appears to date to an earlier period than the Burton Store and was probably on the property prior to the move of the store to this lot."

== See also ==
- Reformed Church of Tappan
- Tappan Historic District
- The Old 76 House
