= Dederer Stone House-Stonehurst =

Historic house in New York, United States

- U.S. National Register of Historic Places
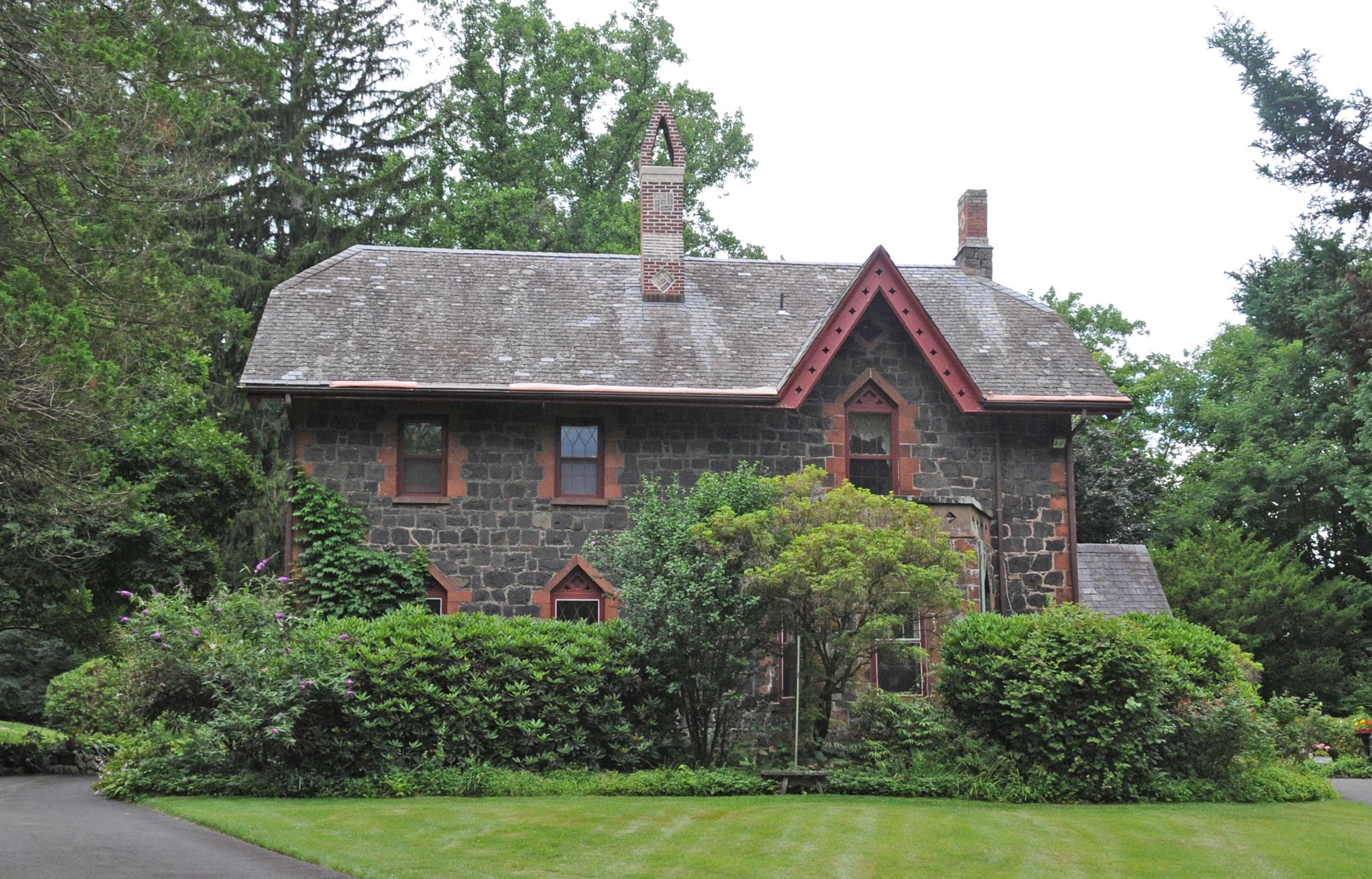

- Location within New York Location within the United States
- Location: 82 Rockland Rd., Orangetown, New York
- Coordinates: 41°1′53″N 73°55′20″W
- Area: 10 acres (4.0 ha)
- Built: 1865
- Architectural style: Gothic Revival
- NRHP reference No.: 02001650
- Added to NRHP: December 31, 2002

Dederer Stone House-Stonehurst is a historic home located at Orangetown in Rockland County, New York. It was built in 1865 and is a 2 1/2-story, T-shaped dwelling constructed using regular size units of local granite with dressed sandstone trim. It features a jerkinhead roof. Also on the property is a two-story barn and stone hitching post.

It was listed on the National Register of Historic Places in 2002. All the files a paperwork for this house have not yet been digitized (all the paperwork is still sitting in a shelf somewhere).
