= Major John André Monument =

- U.S. National Register of Historic Places
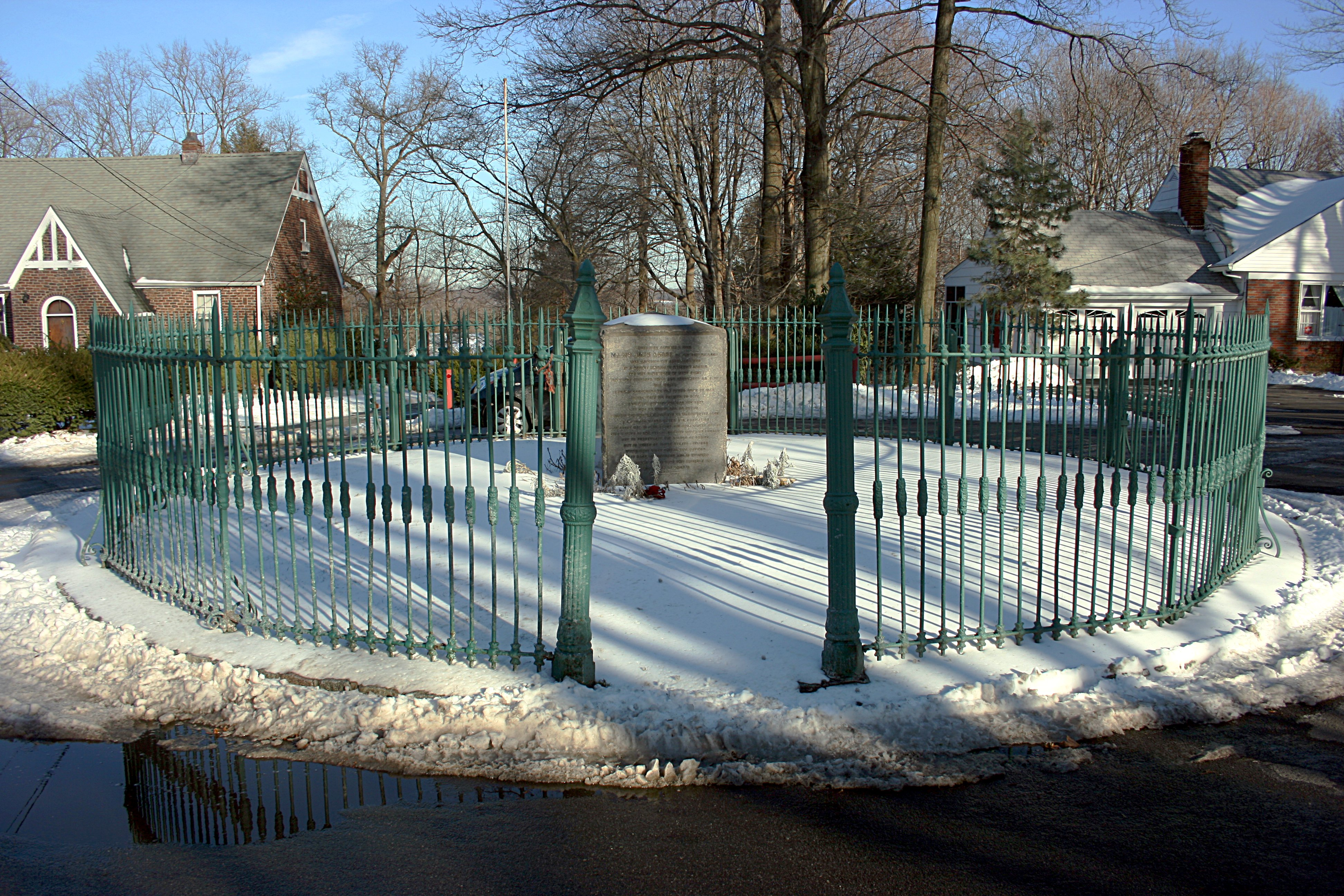
- Major John André Monument

- Location within New York Location within the United States
- Location: 42 Andre Hill, Tappan, New York
- Coordinates: 41°1′17″N 73°57′17″W
- Area: less than one acre
- Built: 1879
- Architect: Taseman & Co.; Olmstead, B.S.
- NRHP reference No.: 06001001
- Added to NRHP: November 8, 2006

Major John André Monument, also known as the Site of Major John André's Hanging and Burial, is a historic monument located at Tappan in Rockland County, New York; it's only a few yards away from the New Jersey border. It is a gray granite monument erected in 1879 and approximately 40 inches square and 58 inches tall. It is located in a circular plot approximately 31 feet in diameter. It commemorates the site of the hanging of Major John André on October 2, 1780.

It was listed on the National Register of Historic Places in 2006.

The monument was constructed in 1879 by millionaire Cyrus W. Field. It was dedicated on October 2, 1879. It was quite controversial when it was first constructed, and there were three attempts to destroy the monument:

- On February 22, 1882, the monument was hacked and mutilated by George Hendrix, of New York City.
- On March 30, 1882 at 11:35 PM, an explosion slightly damaged the monument.
- On November 3, 1885 at 10:00 PM, an explosion destroyed the iron fence surrounding the monument and toppled the monument.

It was felt that a monument to a British spy was an insult to George Washington; for this reason, a bronze tablet was later added to commemorate the bravery of Washington and his generals during a crisis of the war.

After Cyrus Field's death, his heirs refused to pay the taxes of $6.38 on the property. George Dickey of Nyack bought the land in a tax auction in October 1895. Mr. Dickey sold the land to the American Scenic and Historic Preservation Society for $250 on November 13, 1905. After the Society disbanded in 1983, the property was conveyed to Rockland County NY.

== Gallery ==
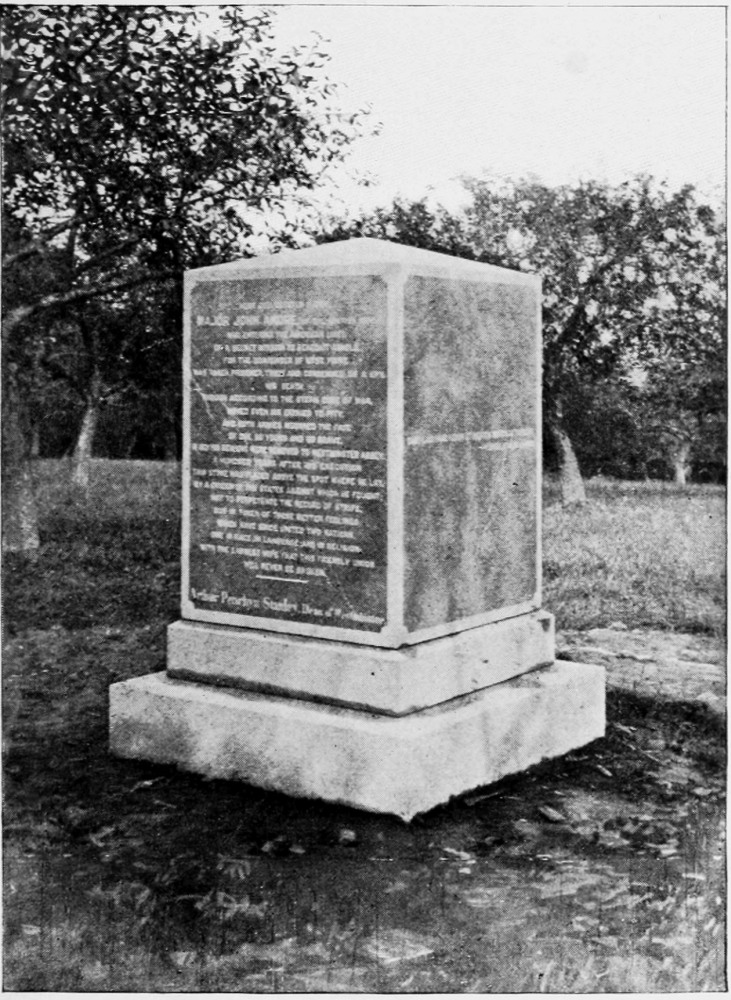
Monument with base

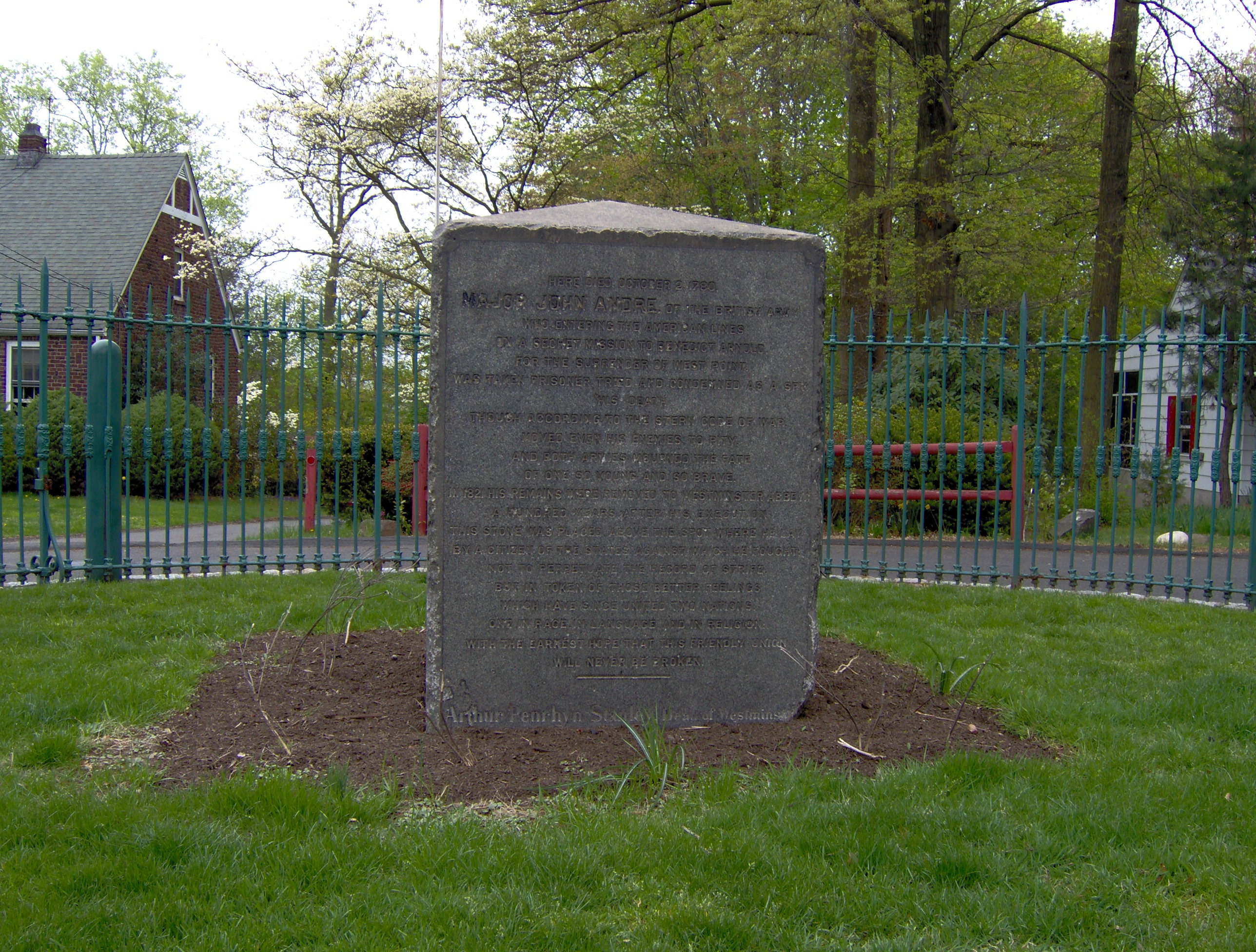
Major John André Monument inscription, April 2008

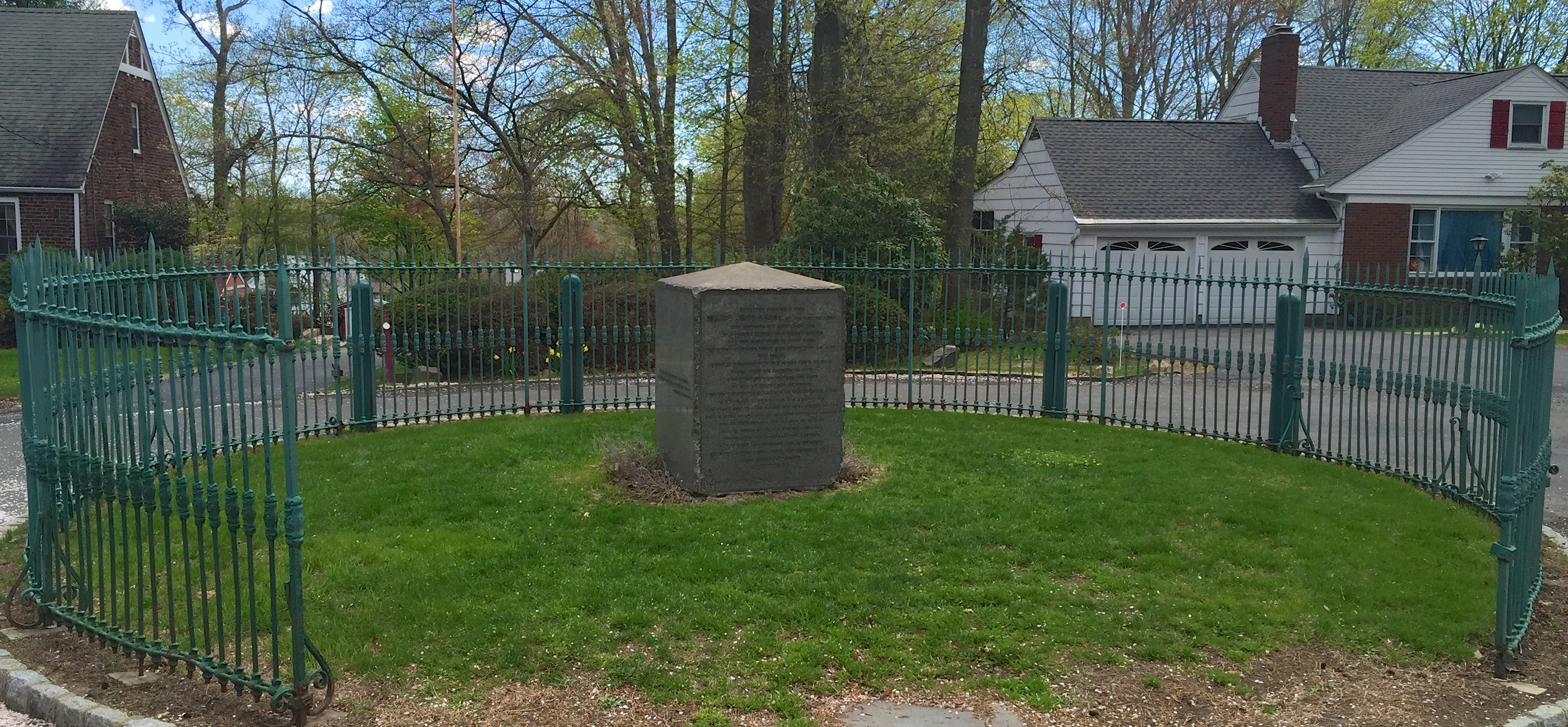

== Inscription ==
HERE DIED OCTOBER 2, 1780.
MAJOR JOHN ANDRE, OF THE BRITISH ARMY
WHO ENTERED THE AMERICAN LINES
ON A SECRET MISSION TO BENEDICT ARNOLD
FOR THE SURRENDER OF WEST POINT,
WAS TAKEN PRISONER TRIED AND CONDEMNED AS A SPY.
HIS DEATH
THOUGH ACCORDING TO THE STERN CODE OF WAR
MOVED EVEN HIS ENEMIES TO PITY,
AND BOTH ARMIES MOURNED THE FATE
OF ONE SO YOUNG AND BRAVE.
IN 1821 HIS REMAINS WERE REMOVED TO WESTMINSTER ABBEY,
A HUNDRED YEARS AFTER HIS EXECUTION.
THIS STONE WAS PLACED ABOVE THE SPOT WHERE HE LAY,
NOT TO PERPETUATE THE RECORD OF STRIFE
BUT IN TOKEN OF THOSE BETTER FEELINGS
WHICH HAVE SINCE UNITED THE NATIONS
ONE IN RACE, IN LANGUAGE AND IN RELIGION,
WITH THE EARNEST HOPE THAT THIS FRIENDLY UNION
WILL NEVER BE BROKEN.

Arthur Penrhyn Stanley, Dean of Westminster
