= Reformed Church of Tappan =

Historic church in New York, United States

- U.S. Historic district – Contributing property
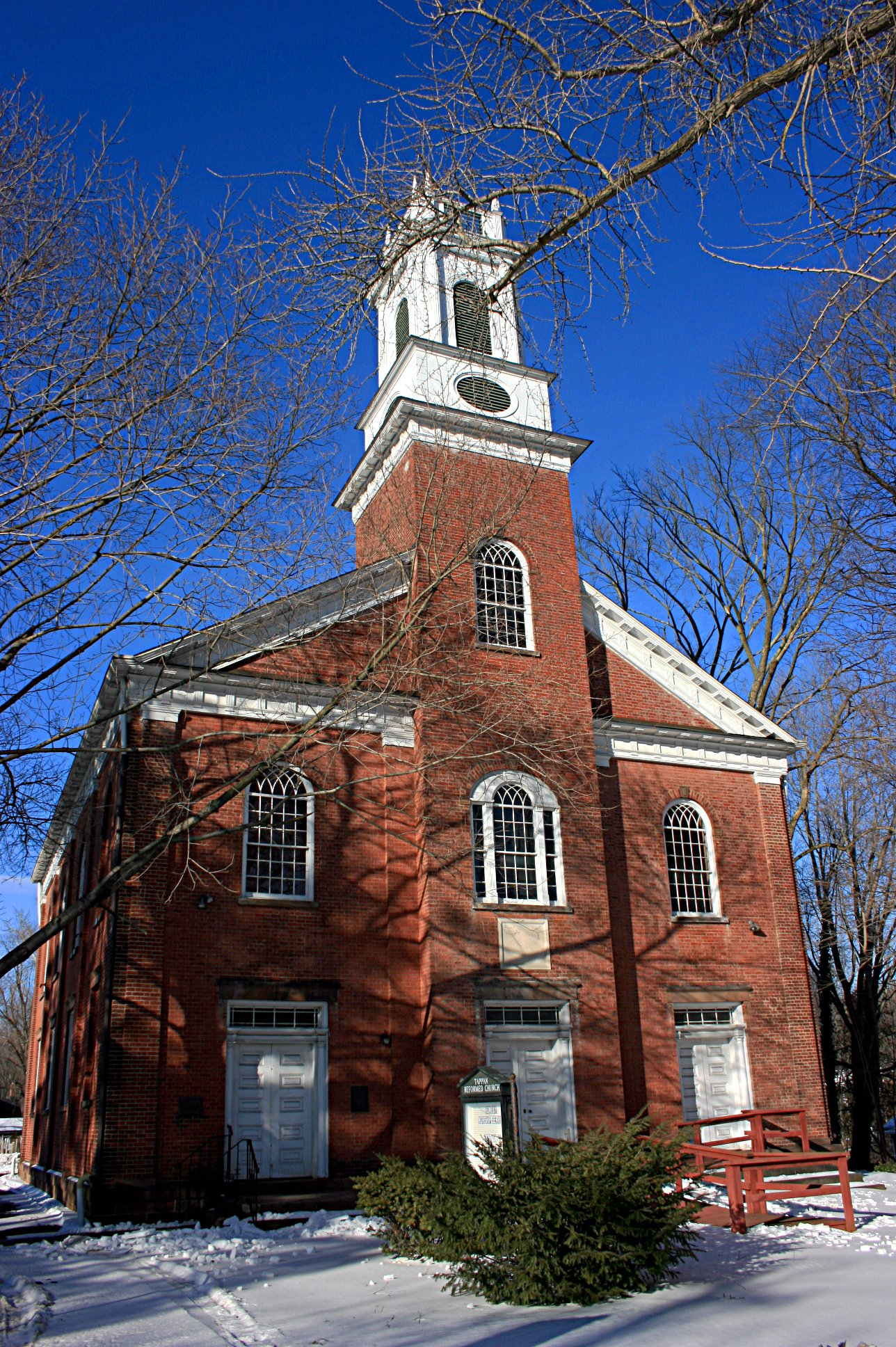
- The church in February 2007

- Location within New York Location within the United States
- Location: Tappan, NY
- Coordinates: 41°1′21.0897″N 73°56′51.6443″W
- Built: 1835
- Architectural style: Federal
- Part of: Tappan Historic District (ID90000689)
- Designated CP: April 26, 1990

The Reformed Church of Tappan in Tappan, Rockland County, New York (formed, 1694) is a historic church. It is a contributing property to the Tappan Historic District.

== History ==
Its first structure built 1716 (worshipers met in homes before this), was used in 1780 for the trial of British Major John André, who conspired with Benedict Arnold to buy the plans for the fortifications at West Point for the British and of Joshua Hett Smith, tried for and acquitted of treason.

The church was used in 1778 after the Baylor Massacre as a prison/hospital.

The current building on the site dates from 1835. The building is designed according to the Federal style and was inspired by the Cedar Street Presbyterian Church in Manhattan. It has box pews to help keep in warmth from little foot stoves brought by worshipers in winter.

In its cemetery are buried original settlers of county, early ministers of church, and American Revolutionary War soldiers. John Haring (1739–1809), a delegate for New York to the Continental Congress, is buried here. Some stones are inscribed in Dutch; there is a marker at this site.

== See also ==
- Tappan Historic District
- The Burton Store
- The Old 76 House
