= Blaise Winter =

American football player, coach, and motivational speaker (born 1962)

No. 96, 68
- Positions: Defensive end, defensive tackle

Personal information
- Born: January 31, 1962 (age 64); Blauvelt, New York, U.S.
- Listed height: 6 ft 3 in (1.91 m)
- Listed weight: 278 lb (126 kg)

Career information
- High school: Tappan Zee (Orangeburg, New York)
- College: Syracuse
- NFL draft: 1984: 2nd round, 35th overall pick

Career history

Playing
- Indianapolis Colts (1984–1985); San Diego Chargers (1986–1987); Green Bay Packers (1988–1991); San Diego Chargers (1992–1993); Tampa Bay Buccaneers (1994)*; San Diego Chargers (1994); Buffalo Bills (1995)
- * Offseason or practice squad member only

Coaching
- UCF (2012) Defensive line coach; Finlandia (2021–2022) Defensive line coach

Awards and highlights
- PFWA All-Rookie Team (1984)

Career NFL statistics
- Tackles: 300
- Sacks: 21
- Fumble recoveries: 5
- Stats at Pro Football Reference

Blaise Winter (born January 31, 1962) is an American motivational speaker as well as a former football player and coach. Winter played professionally as a defensive end for the Indianapolis Colts, San Diego Chargers and Green Bay Packers on the National Football League (NFL), and coached college football for the UCF Knights.

== College career ==
After playing football, basketball and track at Tappan Zee High School, Winter took a tour of colleges in the Northeast United States after his senior year of high school, looking for an opportunity to play college football. Syracuse was the only school to offer Winter a scholarship, and that was only after a previous commit decommitted. Winter was named a team captain and most valuable player during his senior season with the Orange.

== Professional career ==
=== Indianapolis Colts ===
Winter was selected by the Indianapolis Colts in the second round (35th overall) of the 1984 NFL draft. He started all but one game during his rookie season, and was named to some all-rookie teams. A shoulder injury landed him on injured reserve during his sophomore season; the Colts released him at the end of the year.

=== San Diego Chargers (first stint) ===
Winter played with the San Diego Chargers during the 1987 season, which was shortened by a players strike.

=== Green Bay Packers ===
Winter was traded to the Green Bay Packers in early 1988 in exchange for past considerations. He started most of the 1988 and 1989 seasons, but played in a limited role in 1990 and was cut by the Packers early in the 1991 calendar year.

Following his release from the team, Winter made telephone calls to every NFL team and also made a highlight reel which was shipped to every team. He started driving to team facilities in an effort to get signed, but did not draw any interest until the offseason, when the San Francisco 49ers, Minnesota Vikings and Los Angeles Rams showed interest, and Winter participated in workouts for the Vikings and 49ers.

=== San Diego Chargers (second stint) ===
Winter was signed by the San Diego Chargers in the time period preceding the 1992 NFL draft. He originally sat third-string on the depth chart, but later started during the season after Joe Phillips refused to agree to a contract and George Thornton did not play well. He played the 1993 season before being cut by the team.

=== Tampa Bay Buccaneers ===
Winter was a member of the Tampa Bay Buccaneers for a brief time in the 1994 offseason.

=== San Diego Chargers (third stint) ===
The Chargers brought Winter back for the 1994 season, but a cut block by Dave Cadigan of the Cincinnati Bengals tore Winter's anterior cruciate ligament in September, ending his season.

=== Buffalo Bills ===
Winter signed with the Buffalo Bills in spring 1995 after an onslaught of injuries to the team's defensive line, but he himself spent the year on the injured reserve list.

== After playing ==
Winter, his wife and children moved to Appleton, Wisconsin after his playing career ended. He wrote an autobiography, entitled "A Reason to Believe". The University of Central Florida hired Winter as a defensive line coach for the 2012 season. Winter spent one season on the coaching staff and then departed, citing a lack of family time. After coaching, Winter became a motivational speaker.

== Personal life ==
Winter was born with a cleft palate and he later grew tumors in both of his ears. He dabbled in martial arts in high school. Winter was diagnosed with a brain tumor in 2016.
