= Cynthia Hesdra =

19th-century American former slave and business owner

Cynthia Hesdra (March 6, 1808, in Tappan, New York, Rockland County – February 9, 1879), daughter to John and Jane Moore. Although Hesdra spent a portion of her life as a slave, at the time of her death, she was quite wealthy. She operated businesses in Nyack, New York and in the city of New York. She also owned several properties in Nyack, New York City, and Bergen County, New Jersey. Her heirs, including her husband Edward, fought over her estate, in a series of precedent setting court cases.

== Early life ==
Hesdra's father, John Moore, was well known in Rockland County. He too was one of the wealthiest men of his town. He owned and operated several businesses, including a mill in Sparkill, New York. The mill wheels he designed were said to have produced blankets for soldiers fighting in the American Civil War and used widely throughout Rockland County.

Very little is known about Hesdra's mother, Jane. She may have been a slave which might explain how Hesdra became enslaved. Cynthia eventually met and married a man by the name of Edward D. Hesdra. Edward Hesdra, a Hebrew mulatto, was the son of a white Virginia planter and a free black woman from Haiti. After their marriage, the couple purchased Cynthia's freedom. The two settled on Amity Street in New York City.

She operated a successful laundry business in New York City and she owned several properties there too. Eventually, she took her trade to Nyack, New York where she also accumulated property and operated her businesses. Among the many properties was a house that was part of the historic Underground Railroad in Nyack. A historical marker at Main Street and Route 9W now stands on the place where the historic house once stood.

The New York Times and other sources reported that she was worth more than $100,000 or more than $3 million in contemporary dollars. At first, there was no indication that Hesdra had a will. Her husband eventually produced a will that he alleged left everything to him. Hesdra's relatives argued that the will was fraudulent and that the signatures had been forged. The battle over Hesdra's fortune went to court. The dispute over her estate included the first application of a new law in New York State that allowed for comparisons between known and disputed signatures.

== Trials after her death and legacy ==
Many people testified during the trials, including several expert witnesses. Ultimately, the courts decided that Cynthia's will was legitimate and awarded the estate to her husband. Ironically, when Edward Hesdra died, there was a dispute concerning his will. Much of Cynthia D Hesdra's fortune was lost in all of the litigation and much of what was left went to several charities and to the state.

On Monday, May 18, 2015, the Toni Morrison Society's Bench by the Road project honored Cynthia D Hesdra in Nyack, New York with the dedication of a bench in Nyack's Memorial Park. Toni Morrison was present for the dedication. The Nyack Bench is one of the first twenty benches dedicated by the Toni Morrison Society to honor the contributions of individuals and organizations of the African Diaspora in the U.S. and beyond.

== Lori Latrice Book ==
There is a book written by Lori L Martin, a sociology professor and Nyack native, which describes the story of not only the Hesdra family, but also of Nyack and the surrounding area, their connection to the Underground railway and the court cases after the death of Hesdra and the management of her fortune. It is not only an account of the experience of this family, but of African Americans as a whole during the late 18th to mid 19-century.
