= Cereo Company =

American manufacturer of soy and cereal products

The Cereo Company of Tappan, New York was an American manufacturer of soy and cereal products in the early 1900s. Among their products were soy flour, which it produced from 1910, and the dextrinizing agent Cereo, which was America's first commercial baby food. It was produced by Macy Deming at the Haring Adams (Deming) House, built in 1790.
