= Tappan Historic District =

Historic district in New York, United States

- U.S. National Register of Historic Places
- U.S. Historic district
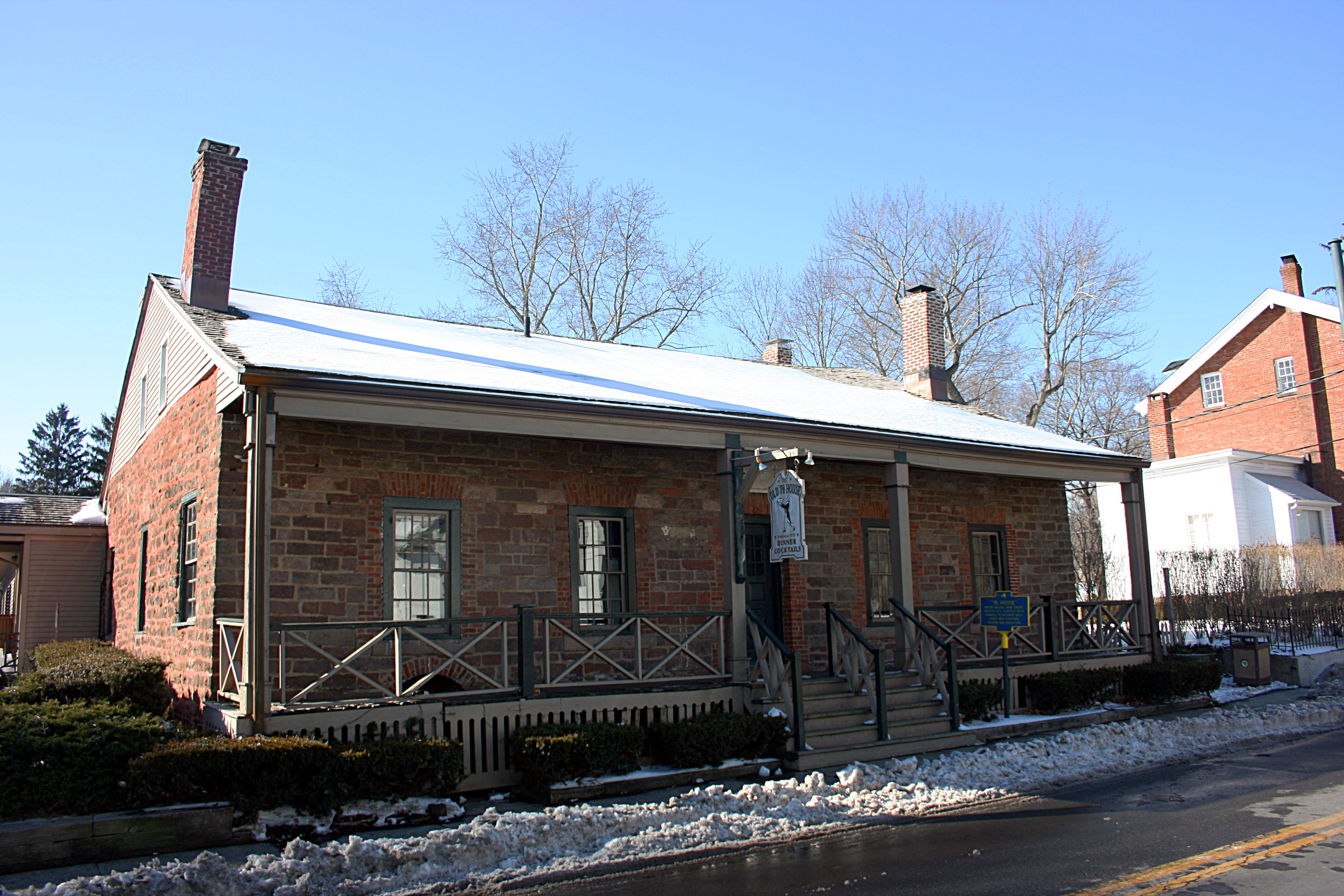
- The Old 76 House, January 2007

- Location within New York Location within the United States
- Location: Roughly bounded by Main St./Kings Hwy., Andre Ave. and New York Central RR, Tappan, New York
- Coordinates: 41°1′18″N 73°56′58″W
- Area: 26 acres (11 ha)
- Built: 1753
- Architectural style: Early Republic, Greek Revival, Colonial
- NRHP reference No.: 90000689
- Added to NRHP: April 26, 1990

Tappan Historic District is a national historic district located at Tappan in Rockland County, New York. It encompasses 26 contributing buildings and three contributing sites. The district consists of 30 properties that reflect the historic commercial and residential core of the late 18th and 19th century village of Tappan. The Reformed Church of Tappan, The Old 76 House, Borcher's Stable and The Burton Store are located within the district boundaries.

It was listed on the National Register of Historic Places in 1990.

== Gallery ==
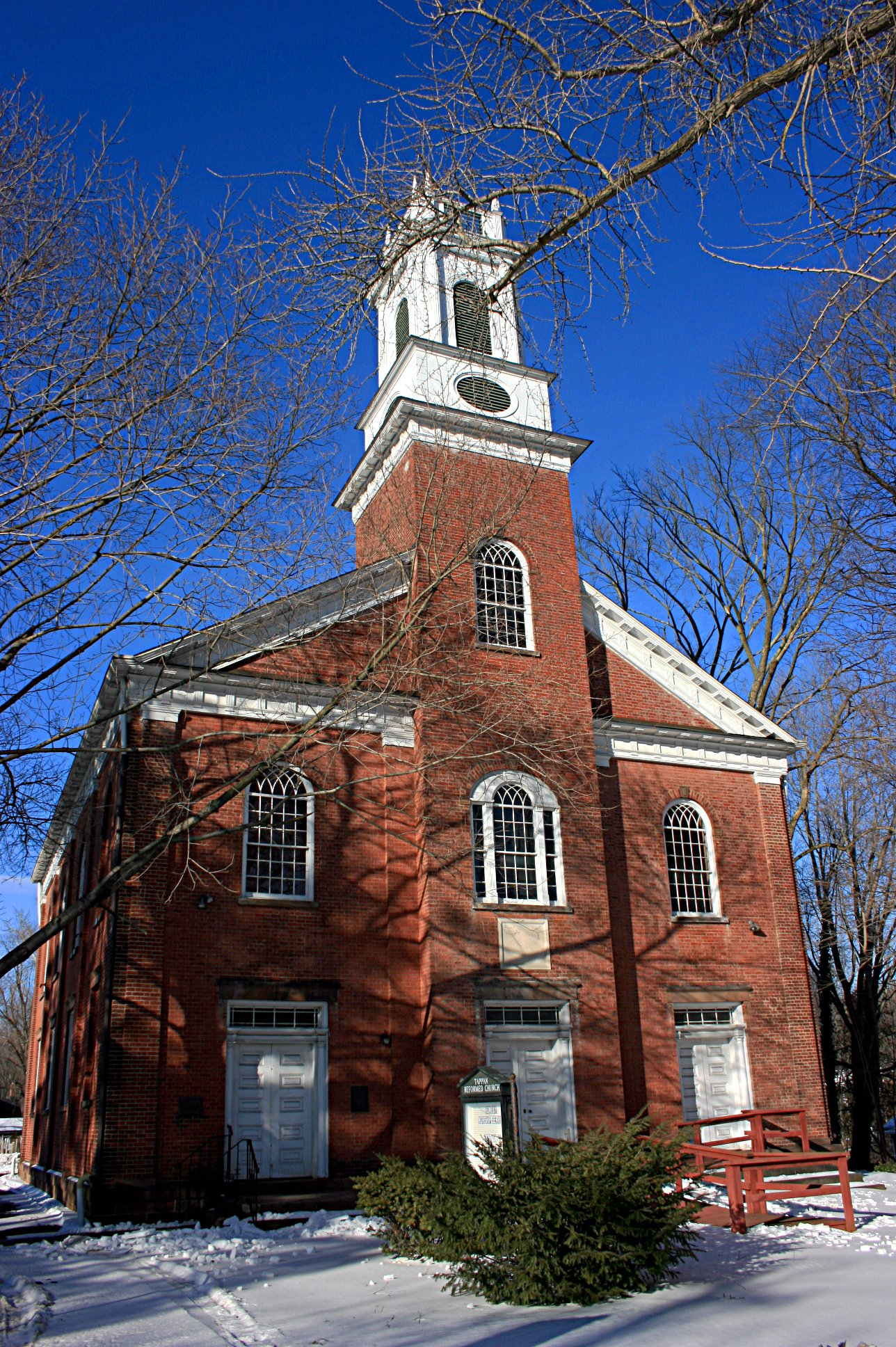
Reformed Church of Tappan, January 2007

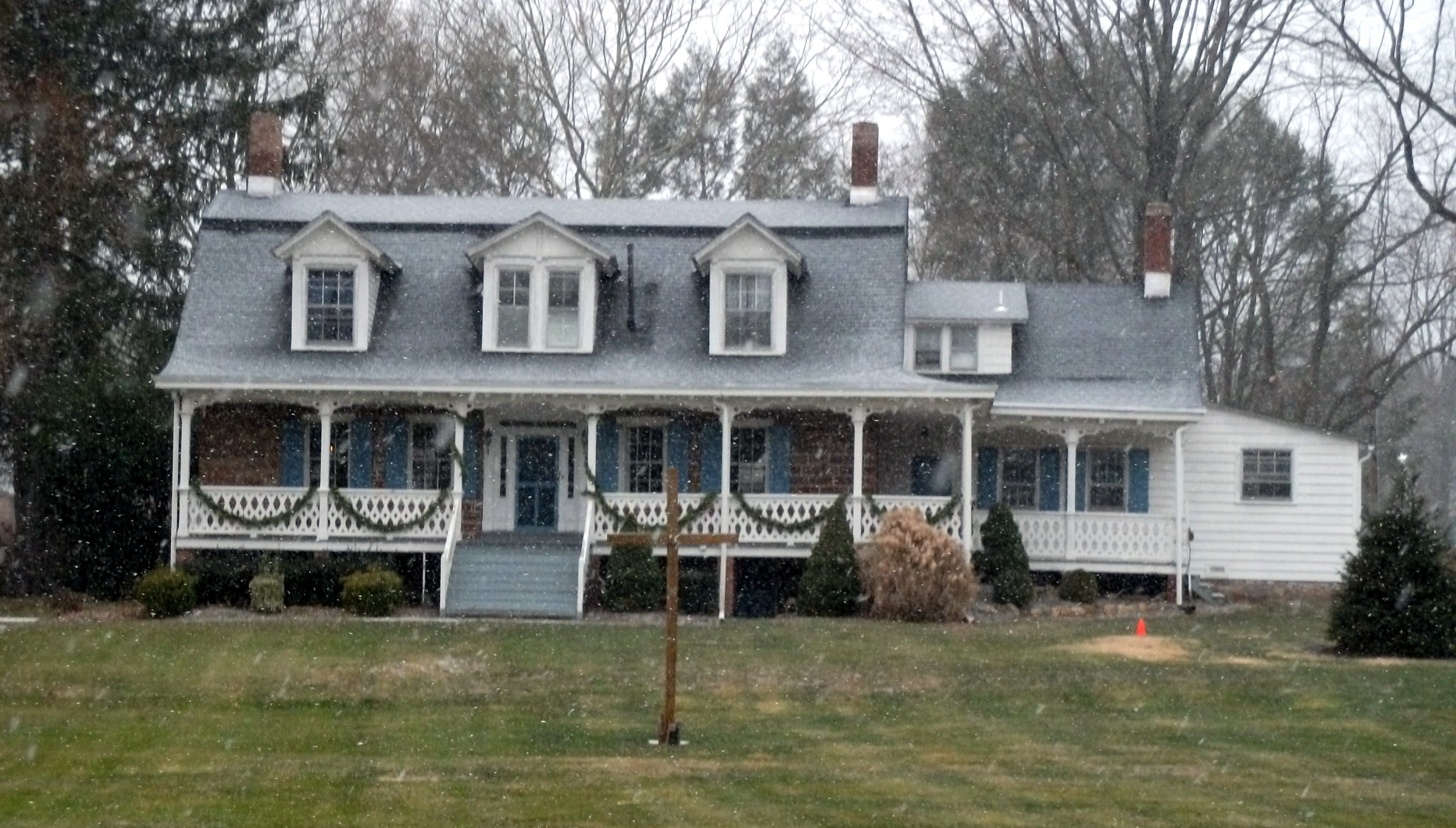
Tappan Reformed Church Manse, December 2010
