= Orangetown, New York =

Orangetown
- Town
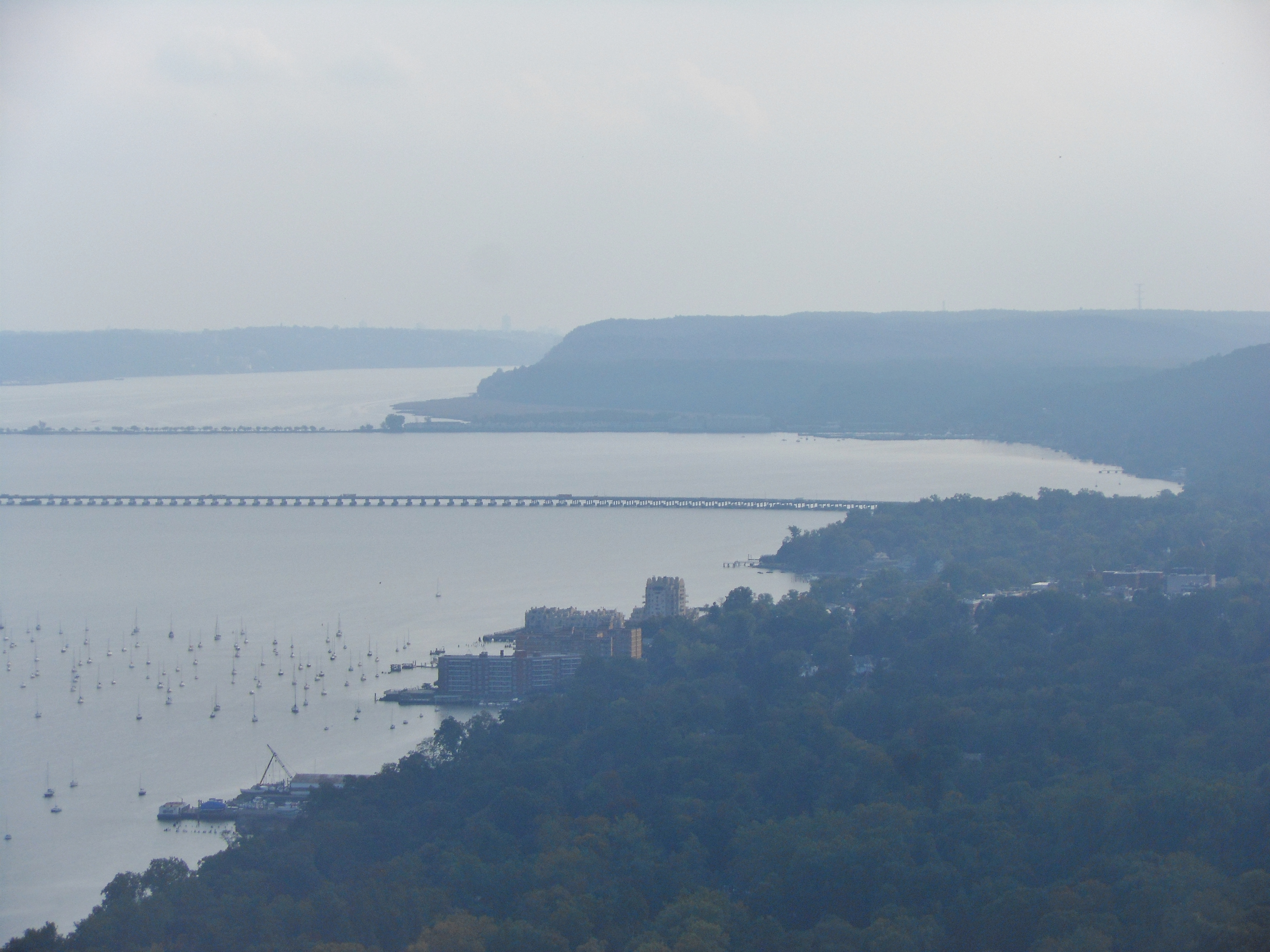
- View of the Hudson River

- Seal

- Location in Rockland County and the state of New York.

- Location within the state of New York
- Coordinates: 41°3′31″N 73°57′42″W
- Country: United States
- State: New York
- County: Rockland
- Settled: 1680
- Established: March 7, 1788

Government
  - Supervisor: Teresa M. Kenny (R)

Area
  - Total: 31.33 sq mi (81.15 km^{2})
  - Land: 24.06 sq mi (62.32 km^{2})
  - Water: 7.27 sq mi (18.83 km^{2})
- Elevation: 95 ft (29 m)

Population (2020)
  - Total: 48,655
  - Density: 2,022.2/sq mi (780.8/km^{2})
- Time zone: UTC−5 (Eastern (EST))
  - Summer (DST): UTC−4 (EDT)
- FIPS code: 36-55211
- GNIS feature ID: 0979316
- Website: www.orangetown.com

Orangetown (English pronunciation: /ˈɒrənd͡ʒˌtaʊn/) is a town in Rockland County, New York, United States, located in the southeastern part of the county. It is northwest of New York City, north of New Jersey, east of the town of Ramapo, south of the town of Clarkstown, and west of the Hudson River. The population was 48,655 at the 2020 census.

== History ==
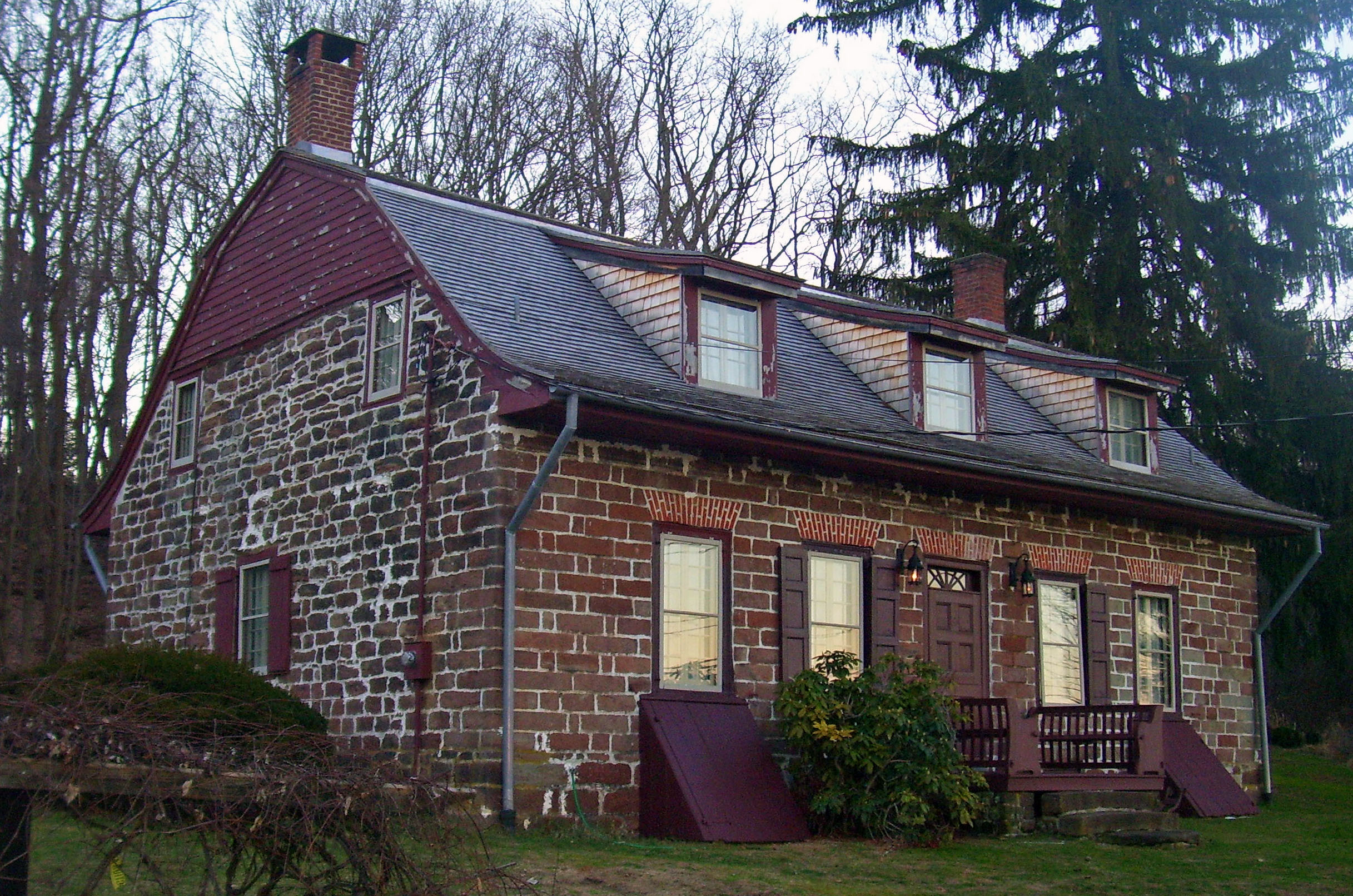
Michael Salyer Stone House

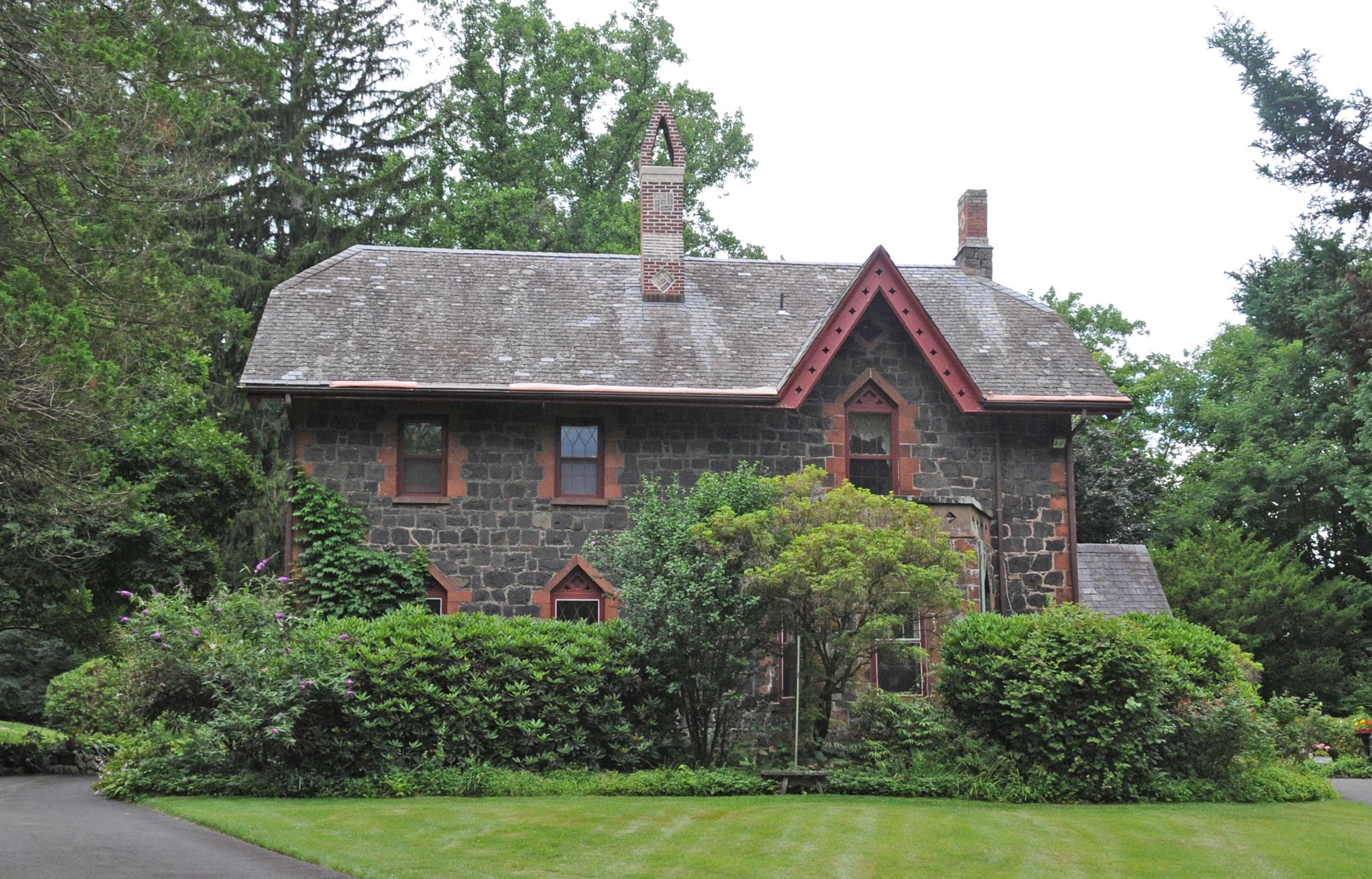
Stonehurst (Granite) - circa 1865

Orangetown was first settled around 1680. The first settlers were Dutch men who purchased a tract of land from the Tappan people in 1686; their patent of the same year called the place Orange, but it was also known as Orangetown and Tappan (after the first village). When the state's first twelve counties were established in 1683, the territory that would become Orangetown lay within Orange County. It became part of Rockland County when that county was created in 1798.

Historical material from the Gazetteer of New York, 1860 & 1861:

ORANGETOWN—was formed March 7, 1788, and was named from Orange co., of which it then formed a part. It lies upon the Hudson, in the S. angle of the co. Its surface is broken by abrupt and rocky hills in the E.; but in the center and W. it spreads out into a rolling or moderately hilly region. The Nyack Hills, extending along the river, are 300 to 500 feet high, with steep, rocky declivities upon the E., but more gradual slopes upon the W. Their summits are rocky and covered with a light growth of forest trees. Snake Hill, in the N.E. corner, upon the line of Clarks- town, is one of the principal peaks. The principal stream is Hackensack River, flowing S. through the W. part. Pascack Creek flows through the extreme W. angle, and Spar Kil is a tributary of the Hudson. Near the N. line are several bog or peat meadows, generally well drained and under cultivation. The red sandstone which crops out on the E. declivities of the hills, within a few rods of the river, between Piermont and Nyack, is extensively quarried and exported for building stone. The soil is a reddish, sandy loam intermixed with clay. Fruit growing and furnishing milk for the New York market have become leading pursuits. Nyack, (p.v.,) upon the Hudson, in the N.E. corner of the town, contains 5 churches, 5 shoe manufactories, a steam tub and pail factory, the Rockland Female Institute, and a private academy. Pop. 1,458. Piermont, (p.v.,) upon the Hudson, in the S. part, was incorp. May 21, 1850. It is the E. terminus of the Piermont Branch of the N. Y. & Erie R. R.,—the one over which the freight is carried. Nearly the whole business of the place is connected with the R.R. establishment. A pier 1 mi. long has been built into the river, where the freight is transferred to and from the cars and barges in the river. Upon each end of the pier are extensive offices for the transaction of the busi- ness of the road. At this place the R.R. co. also have a large iron foundery and extensive repair shops. Pop. 2,204. Tappantown, (p.v.,) near the N. J. line, contains 2 churches and 30 dwellings. This place was the scene of the trial of Andre, and for a time in 1780 was the head- quarters of Gen. Washington. Rockland, (Palisades p.o.,) upon the Hudson, in the S. part of the town, contains 3 churches and 40 dwellings. Orange Mills, Middletown, and Blauveltville, (p. o.,) a station on the N. Y. & E. R. R., are hamlets. The first settlement is supposed to have been made by the Dutch, as early as 1680. The first church (Ref. Prot. D.) was formed Oct. 24, 1694; and the first preacher was Rev. Guilllam Bartholf. The first church edifice was erected in 1716. There are 16 churches in town.

The Orangetown Resolutions, a protest of the imposition of duties and the closing of the port of Boston by the British Parliament, were passed in Tappan on July 4, 1774, a precursor of the American Revolution.

== Geography ==
According to the United States Census Bureau, the town has a total area of 31.4 square miles (81 km^{2}), of which 24.2 square miles (63 km^{2}) is land and 7.2 square miles (19 km^{2}), or 22.92%, is water.

The eastern border is defined by the Hudson River, and the southern border is New Jersey. The town is bordered to the north by the town of Clarkstown and to the northwest by the town of Ramapo.

== Demographics ==
Historical population
Census	Pop.	Note	%±
1790	1,175		—
1820	2,257		—
1830	1,947		−13.7%
1840	2,771		42.3%
1850	4,769		72.1%
1860	7,060		48.0%
1870	6,810		−3.5%
1880	8,077		18.6%
1890	10,343		28.1%
1900	10,456		1.1%
1910	14,370		37.4%
1920	14,284		−0.6%
1930	18,029		26.2%
1940	26,662		47.9%
1950	34,554		29.6%
1960	43,172		24.9%
1970	53,533		24.0%
1980	48,612		−9.2%
1990	46,742		−3.8%
2000	47,711		2.1%
2010	49,212		3.1%
2020	48,655		−1.1%
U.S. Decennial Census 2020

As of the census of 2000, there were 47,711 people, 17,330 households, and 11,940 families residing in the town. The population density was 1,973.1 inhabitants per square mile (761.8/km^{2}). There were 17,827 housing units at an average density of 737.3 per square mile (284.7/km^{2}). The racial makeup of the town was 83.97% White, 5.88% African American, 0.11% Native American, 6.42% Asian, 0.02% Pacific Islander, 1.66% from other races, and 1.93% from two or more races. Hispanic or Latino residents of any race were 6.02% of the population.

There were 17,330 households, out of which 30.3% had children under the age of 18 living with them, 57.1% were married couples living together, 8.8% had a female householder with no husband present, and 31.1% were non-families. 25.8% of all households were made up of individuals, and 11.0% had someone living alone who was 65 years of age or older. The average household size was 2.62 and the average family size was 3.18.

In the town, 22.5% of residents were under the age of 18, 8.1% were from 18 to 24, 28.9% from 25 to 44, 24.9% from 45 to 64, and 15.6% were 65 years of age or older. The median age was 39 years. For every 100 females, there were 92.6 males. For every 100 females age 18 and over, there were 89.7 males.

The median income for a household in the town was $70,477, and the median income for a family was $87,341 (these figures had risen to $91,497 and $111,742 respectively as of a 2007 estimate. Males had a median income of $53,596 versus $39,886 for females. The per capita income for the town was $33,170. About 2.4% of families and 4.8% of the population were below the poverty line, including 4.2% of those under age 18 and 8.0% of those age 65 or over.

As of the 2020 Census, there were 48,655 people residing in the Town of Orangetown.

== Education ==
Education in the town is provided by the South Orangetown Central School District and the Nyack School District

== Elected representation ==
Orangetown has a Town Supervisor, presently Teresa Kenny (R). Orangetown is represented by the council-form of government, with four councilmen elected alternating years for four year terms. Presently the Orangetown Town Council consists of Gerald "Jerry" Bottari (D), Paul Valentine (R), Thomas F. Diviny (R), and Brian Donohue (R). Orangetown is part of New York's 17th Congressional District represented in the United States House of Representatives by Mike Lawler. In state government, it is represented by Senator Bill Weber and Assemblyman Aron Wieder.

== Communities and locations ==
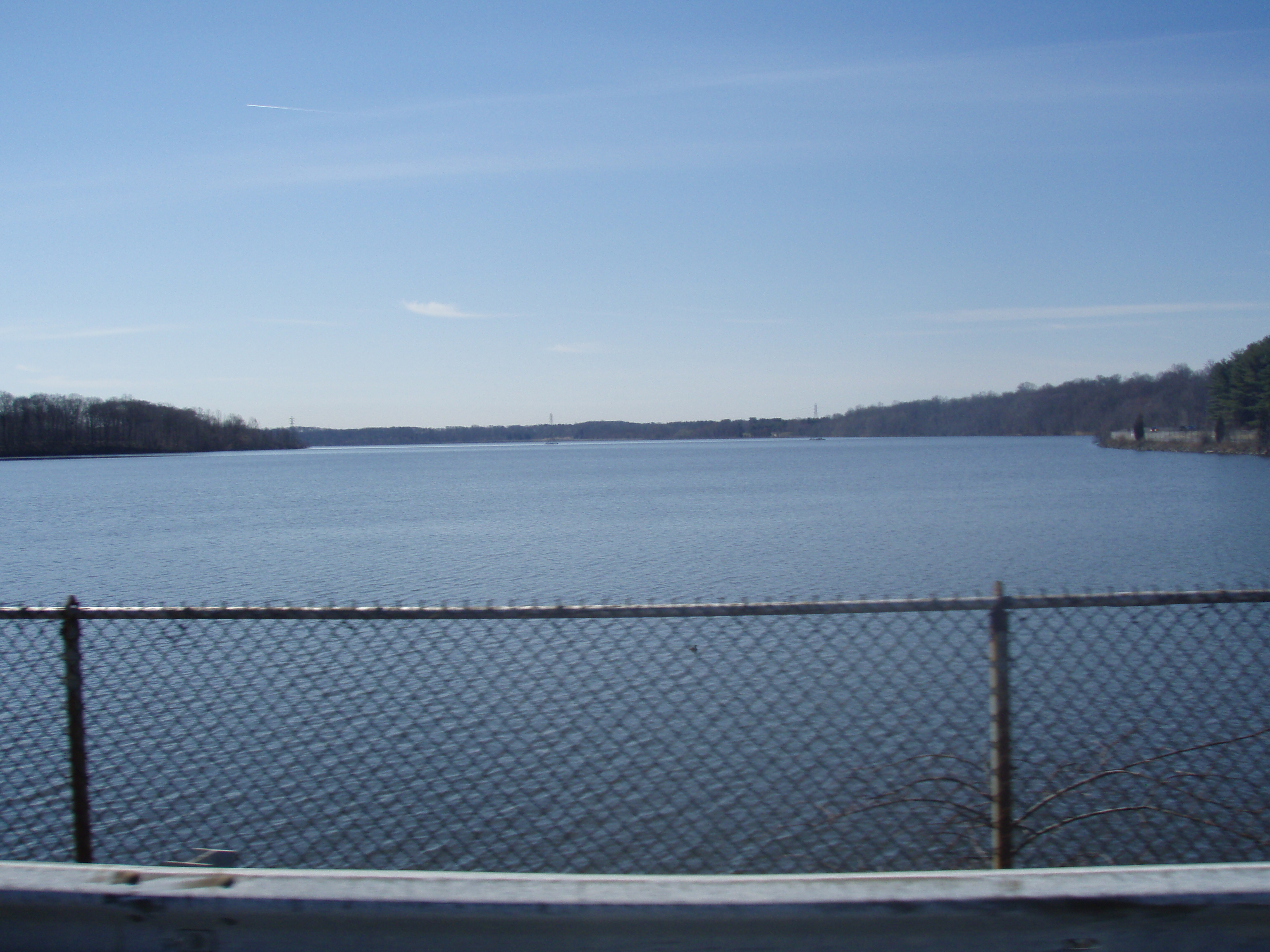
Lake Tappan

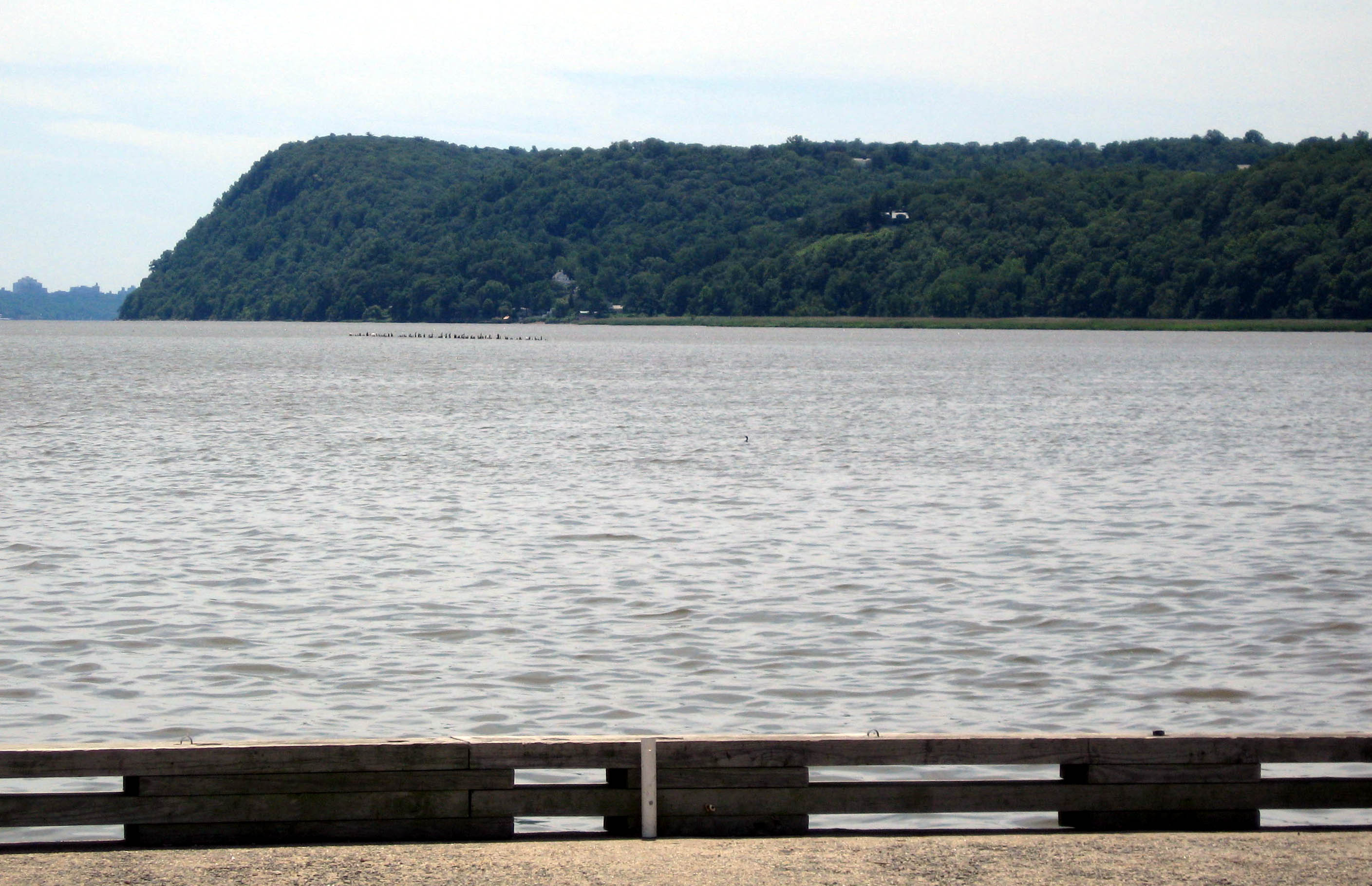
Tallman Mountain

=== Incorporated villages ===
- Grand View-on-Hudson
- Nyack
- Piermont

=== Unincorporated hamlets ===
- Blauvelt – A hamlet in the central part of the town.
- Nauraushaun – A hamlet east of Pearl River.
- Orangeburg – A hamlet in the southern part of the town.
- Pearl River – A hamlet in the western part of the town.
- Palisades – A hamlet in the southeastern corner of the town.
- South Nyack – A hamlet south of the village of Nyack. Was formerly incorporated from 1878 until 2022
- Sparkill – A hamlet southwest of the village of Piermont.
- Tappan – A hamlet in the southeastern corner of the town.
- Upper Grandview – A hamlet south of the village of South Nyack.

=== Other notable locations ===
- Blauvelt State Park – A state park northeast of Blauvelt.
- Dederer Stone House-Stonehurst - (NRHP)
- Lake Tappan – A reservoir running north to south, roughly bisecting the town, and entering New Jersey at the southern town line.
- Tallman Mountain State Park – A state park in Palisades, south of the village of Piermont.

=== Former Unincorporated hamlets ===
- Sickletown – A hamlet.
- Middletown – A hamlet.

== Transportation ==
Pearl River station in Pearl River gives commuter rail service from Spring Valley south to Hoboken Terminal, on New Jersey Transit's Pascack Valley Line.

The New York Thruway carries I-87 through the town. The highway continues to the east, on the Tappan Zee Bridge, over the Hudson River, to Westchester County.

== Notable people ==
- Bill Murray
- George Worth, born Gyorgy Woittitz (1915–2006), a Hungarian-born American Olympic medalist fencer, served as captain of the South Orangetown Ambulance Corps
