= South Orangetown Central School District =

School district in New York, United States

- 160 Van Wyck Rd, Blauvelt, NY 10913

District information
- Grades: PreK to 12
- Schools: 4

Other information
- Website: www.socsd.org

South Orangetown Central School District (SOCSD) is a school district headquartered in Blauvelt, New York.

== Schools ==
Its schools are William O. Schaefer Elementary School in Tappan, Cottage Lane Elementary School in Blauvelt, South Orangetown Middle School in Blauvelt, and Tappan Zee High School in Orangeburg.

=== Former schools ===
Tappan Zee Elementary School used to be a part of the district but closed in 2016 due to declining enrollment.

== Superintendents ==
- Kenneth Mitchell (2008–2014)
- Robert Pritchard (2015–2022)
- Brian Culot (2022–present)
