= Orangetown Resolutions =

1774 declaration of protest against the Intolerable Acts in Orangetown, colonial New York

The Orangetown Resolutions were adopted on July 4, 1774, exactly two years prior to the adoption of the United States Declaration of Independence. The resolutions were part of a widespread movement of town and county protests of the Intolerable Acts passed by the British Parliament in 1774.

The resolutions were adopted at the home of Yoast Mabie, a Dutch colonial house in Tappan, New York, in the town of Orangetown in Rockland County. The house was demolished in 1835.

== Text of the resolutions ==
The resolutions read:

At a meeting of the Freeholders and inhabitants of Orangetown and Province of New York, on Monday, the fourth day of July, 1774, at the house of Mr. Yoast Mabie in said town, the following resolves were agreed upon and passed, viz:

- 1st, That we are and ever wish to be, true and loyal subjects to his Majesty George the Third, king of Great Britain.
- 2nd, That we are most cordially disposed to support his majesty and defend his crown and dignity in every constitutional measure, as far as lies in our power.
- 3rd, That however well disposed we are towards his majesty, we cannot see the late acts of Parliament imposing duties upon us, and the act for shutting up the port of Boston, without declaring our abhorrence of measures so unconstitutional and big with destruction.
- 4th, That we are in duty bound to use every just and lawful measure to obtain a repeal of acts, not only destructive to us, but which, of course, must distress thousands in the mother country.
- 5th, That it is our unanimous opinion that the stopping of all exportation and importation to and from Great Britain and the West Indies would be the most effectual method to obtain a speedy repeal.
- 6th, That it is our most ardent wish to see concord and harmony restored to England and her colonies.
- 7th, That the following gentlemen, to wit: Colonel Abraham Lent, John Haring, Esquire, Mr. Thomas Outwater, Mr. Gardner Jones, and Peter T. Haring, may be a committee for this town to correspond with the City of New York, and to conclude and agree upon such measures as they shall judge necessary in order to obtain a repeal of said acts.

== Signers ==
Signers and objectors can be found in Historical record to the close of the nineteenth century of Rockland County, New York. Ed. by Arthur S. Tompkins. Nyack, N.Y., Van Deusen and Joyce, 1902: pages 93-97. https://babel.hathitrust.org/cgi/pt?id=loc.ark:/13960/t7xk8n73f&seq=105

== See also ==
- Continental Association, adopted by the First Continental Congress on October 20, 1774
- Non-importation Act, passed by the United States Congress in 1806
