= Tappan, New York =

- Census-designated place
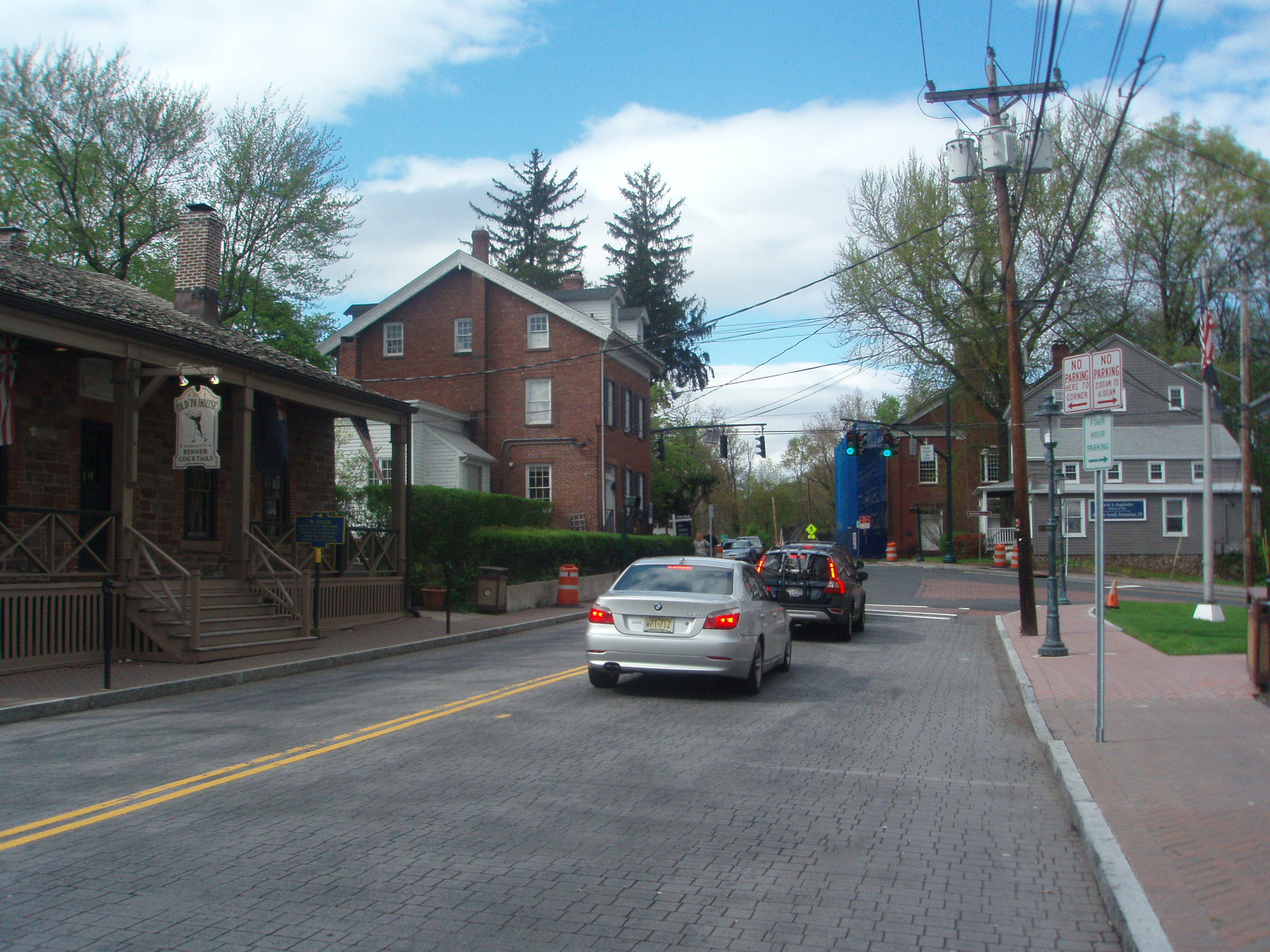
- Main Street In Tappan

- Location in Rockland County and the state of New York.

- Location within the state of New York
- Coordinates: 41°1′33″N 73°57′4″W
- Country: United States
- State: New York
- County: Rockland
- Town: Orangetown

Area
  - Total: 2.76 sq mi (7.16 km^{2})
  - Land: 2.76 sq mi (7.14 km^{2})
  - Water: 0.0077 sq mi (0.02 km^{2})
- Elevation: 46 ft (14 m)

Population (2020)
  - Total: 6,673
  - Density: 2,420.1/sq mi (934.42/km^{2})
- Time zone: UTC-5 (Eastern (EST))
  - Summer (DST): UTC-4 (EDT)
- ZIP code: 10983
- Area code: 845
- FIPS code: 36-73154
- GNIS feature ID: 0967057

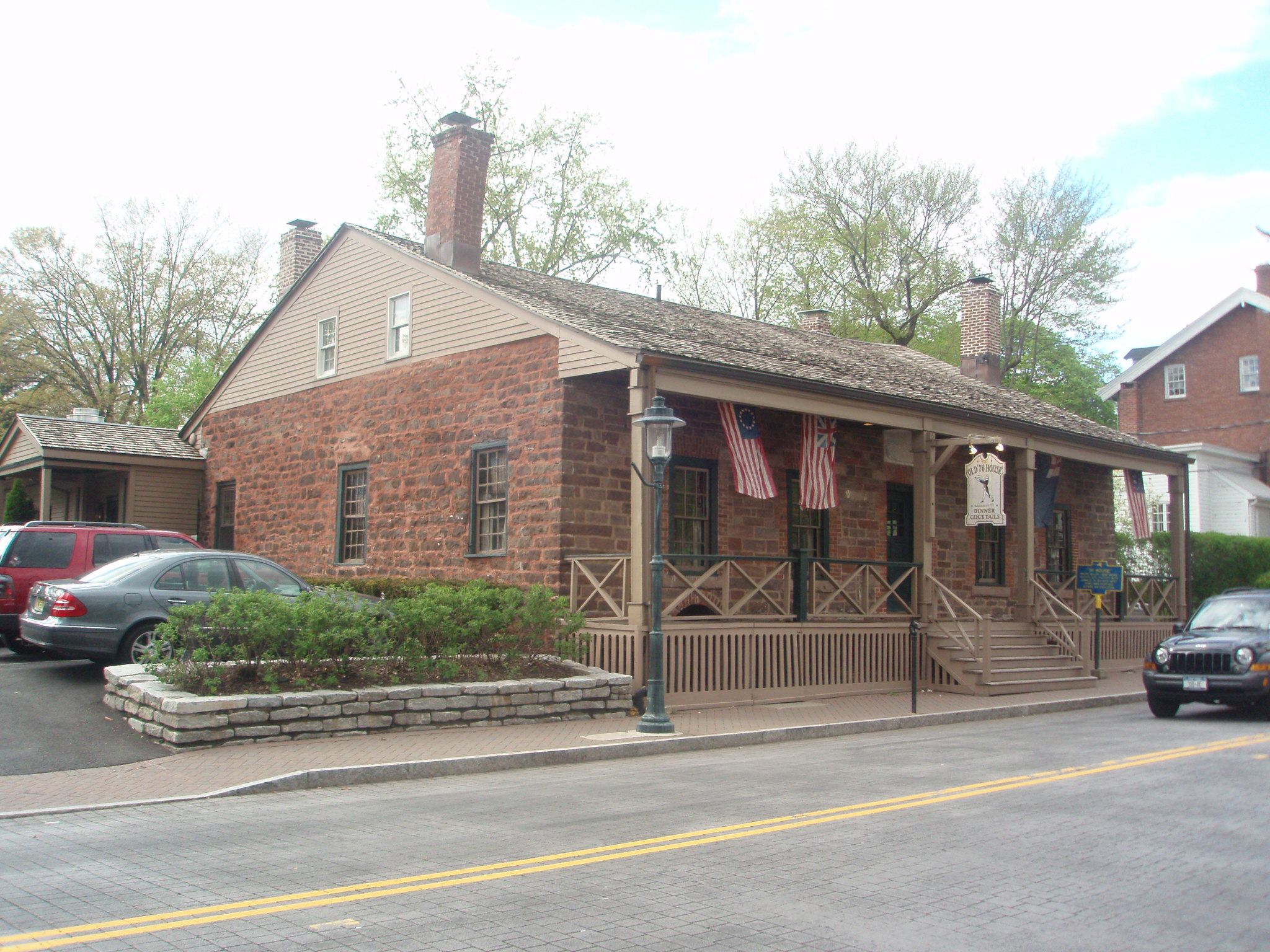
Old 76 House Restaurant in Tappan, NY

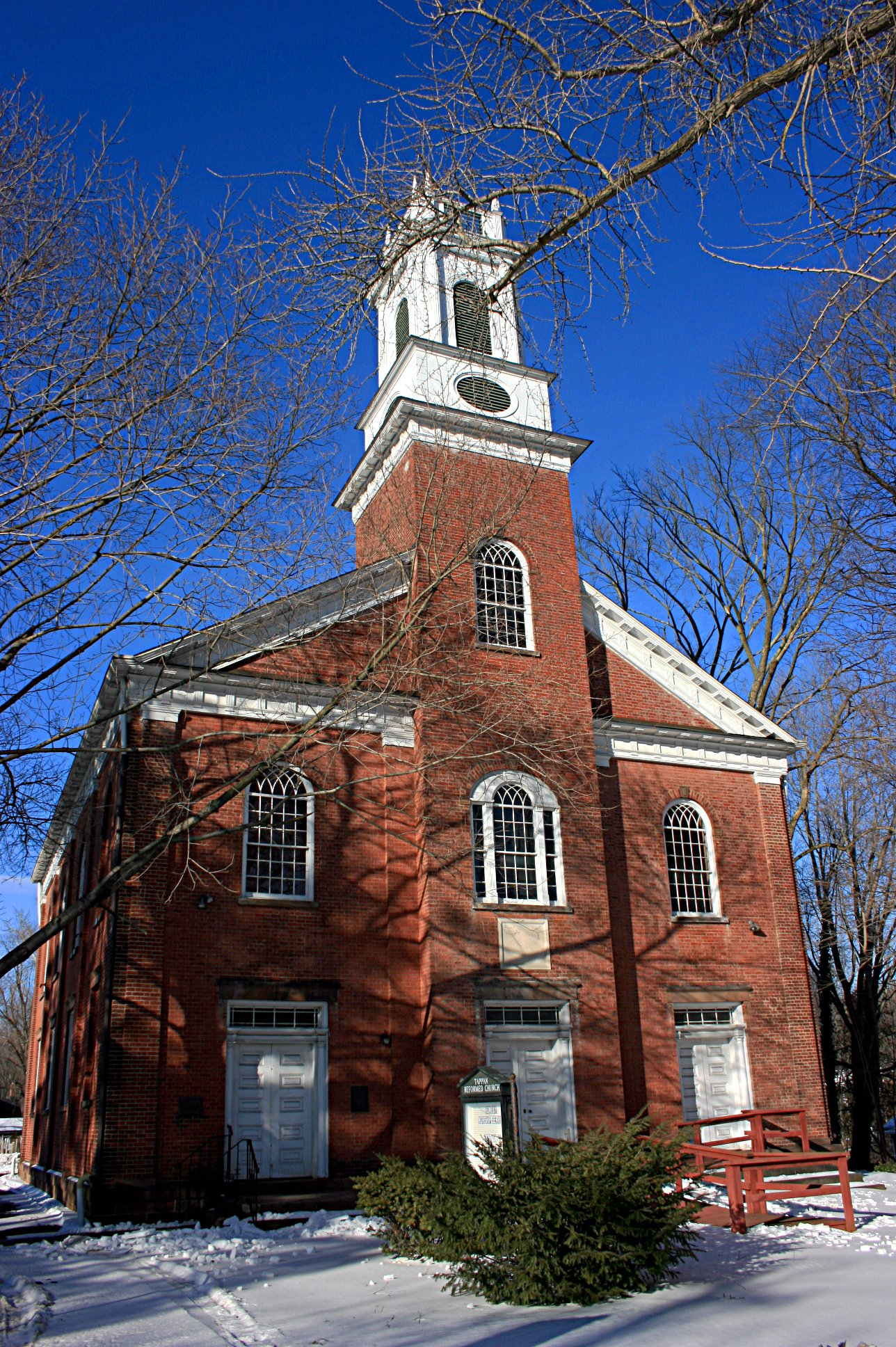
Reformed Church of Tappan

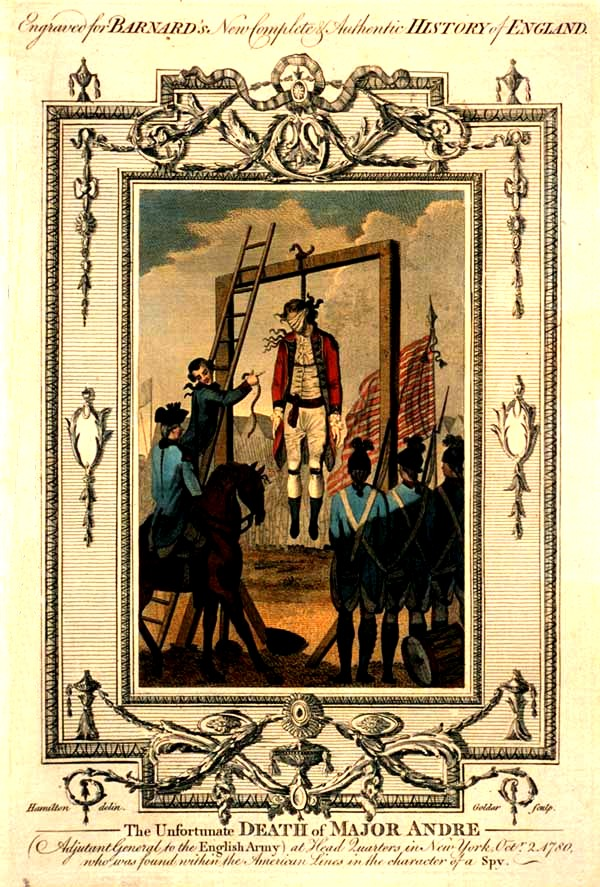
Hanging of Major André

West Shore Railroad, circa 1910.

Tappan (English pronunciation: /tæˈpæːn/) is a hamlet and census-designated place in the town of Orangetown, New York, United States. It is located northwest of Alpine, New Jersey, north of Northvale, New Jersey and Rockleigh, New Jersey, northeast of Old Tappan, New Jersey, east/southeast of Nauraushaun and Pearl River, south of Orangeburg, southwest of Sparkill, and west of Palisades; Tappan shares a border with each. The population was 6,673, according to the 2020 census.

== History ==
=== Early history ===
The Tappan tribe were a Lenape people who inhabited the region radiating from the Hudson Palisades and the New York – New Jersey Highlands at the time of European colonization in the 17th century. "Tappan" is derived from the Lenape word "tuphanne" thought to mean "cold water."

The first Orange County courthouse was built in 1691 in Tappan, though by 1737, sessions alternated between Tappan and Goshen. The first school house in Rockland County was built in 1711 in Tappan. It was used as a school until 1860. There would not be another school in the county until late in the 18th century.

=== American Revolution ===
The Orangetown Resolutions were adopted in 1774 at the home of Yoast Mabie. The Dutch colonial house was built by his brother Casparus Mabie in Tappan. When Great Britain imposed duties on the colonies and closed the port of Boston, local inhabitants passed resolutions calling for a boycott of British imports and exports on Monday, July 4, 1774, two years to the day before the Declaration of Independence was proclaimed.

British Major John André, who conspired with Benedict Arnold to allow the takeover of West Point by the British, was captured in 1780 in Tarrytown on his way back to the British lines with the plans of the fort's fortifications. Major André was brought to Tappan, confined at Caspurus Mabie's home, known as "Mabie's Inn," and brought to trial at the Reformed Church of Tappan; he was found guilty of espionage, hanged, and buried nearby.

Strickland, Major André's executioner, who was confined at the camp in Tappan as a dangerous Tory during André's trial, was granted liberty for accepting the duty of hangman and returned to his home in the Ramapo Valley or Smith's Cove. Joshua Hett Smith, accused of conspiring with Major André, was also brought to trial at the Reformed Church of Tappan. The trial lasted four weeks and ended in Smith's acquittal.

General George Washington, who in 1789 became the first president of the United States, used the 1700 DeWint House, Rockland County's oldest existing structure, as his headquarters four times between 1780 and 1783, and dined at Mabie's Inn during the American Revolution. Today the house known as Mabie's Inn is a restaurant operating as The Old 76 House.

=== Recent history ===
- Cereo, an early commercially produced baby food, was manufactured in the early 1900s by Macy Deming at the Haring Adams (Deming) House.
- The Tappan Fire Department's 100th anniversary was celebrated on October 13, 2007, with a Mardi Gras-style parade, complete with beaded necklaces and confetti. The Budweiser Clydesdale horses made an appearance.

== Geography ==
Tappan is located at 41°1′33″N 73°57′4″W (41.025897, −73.951180).

According to the United States Census Bureau, the region has a total area of 2.8 square miles (7.3 km^{2}), all land.

== Demographics ==
Historical population
Census	Pop.	Note	%±
2020	6,673		—
U.S. Decennial Census

As of the census of 2000, there were 6,757 people, 2,261 households, and 1,887 families residing in the community. The population density was 2,423.0 inhabitants per square mile (935.5/km^{2}). There were 2,294 housing units at an average density of 822.6 per square mile (317.6/km^{2}). The racial makeup of the CDP was 82.27% White, 1.27% African American, 0.12% Native American, 13.51% Asian, 0.07% Pacific Islander, 1.48% from other races, and 1.27% from two or more races. Hispanic or Latino of any race were 6.36% of the population.

There were 2,261 households, out of which 37.1% had children under the age of 18 living with them, 73.6% were married couples living together, 7.3% had a female householder with no husband present, and 16.5% were non-families. 13.6% of all households were made up of individuals, and 7.1% had someone living alone who was 65 years of age or older. The average household size was 2.98 and the average family size was 3.27.

In the region the population was spread out, with 24.9% under the age of 18, 6.2% from 18 to 24, 26.0% from 25 to 44, 28.1% from 45 to 64, and 14.8% who were 65 years of age or older. The median age was 41 years. For every 100 females, there were 94.7 males. For every 100 females age 18 and over, there were 91.8 males.

The average household income in Tappan is $167,568 with a poverty rate of 2.43%. The median rental costs in recent years comes to $2,256 per month, and the median house value is $497,700. The median age in Tappan is 45.5 years, 40.7 years for males, and 49.3 years for females. For every 100 females there are 103.5 males.

== Tourism ==
=== Historical markers ===
- 1700 DeWint House, Oak Tree Road and Livingston Avenue
- Major John Andre Monument, Old Tappan Road and 42 André Hill Road
- General Lafayette, Western Highway and Christine Lane
- Hickory Hill Cooperative, Hickory Hill and Old Tappan roads
- The First Court House, Tappan Green
- Trial of André, 32 Old Tappan Road
- Washington's Camp, Western Highway and Christine Lane

=== Landmarks and places of interest ===
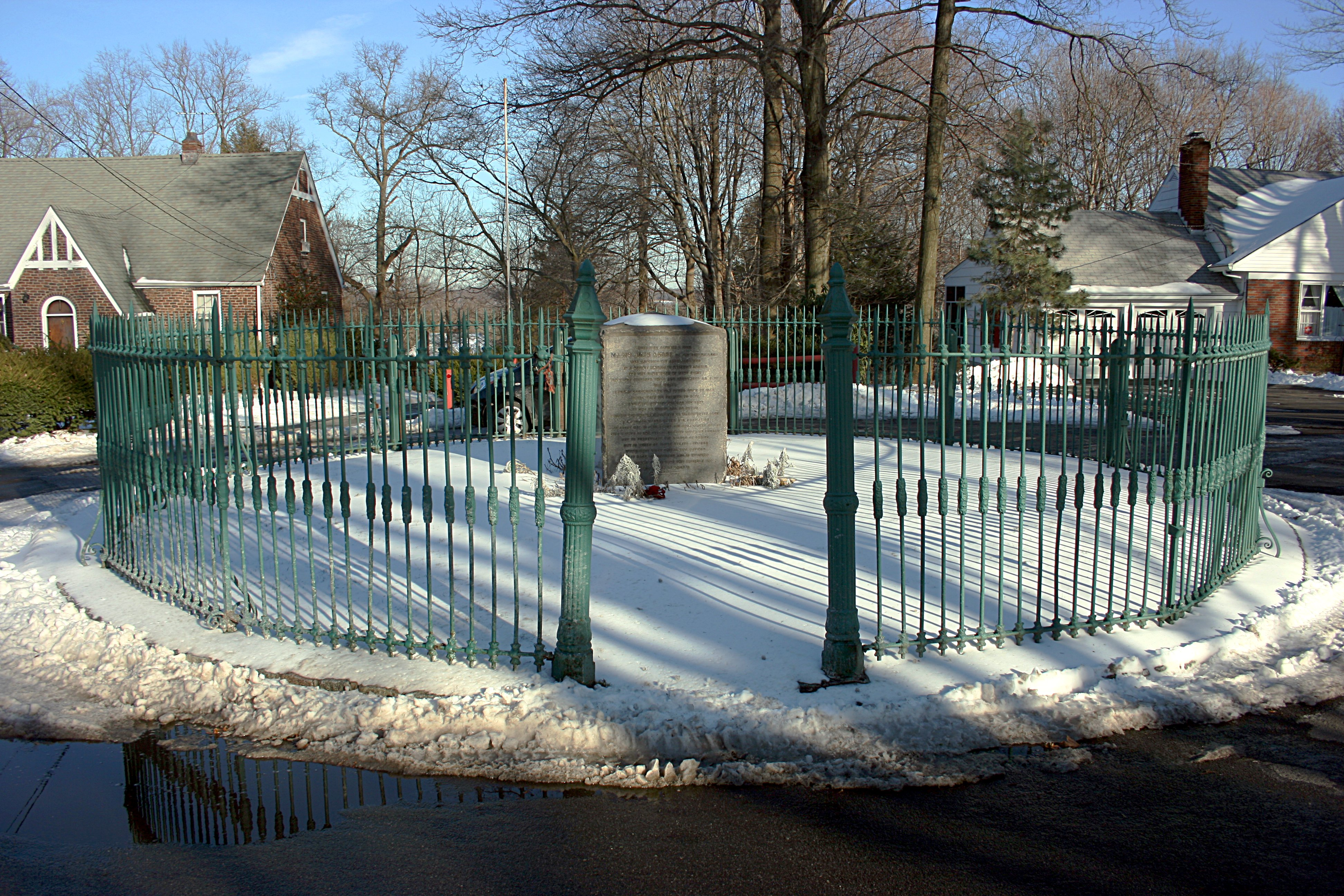
Major John André's Memorial

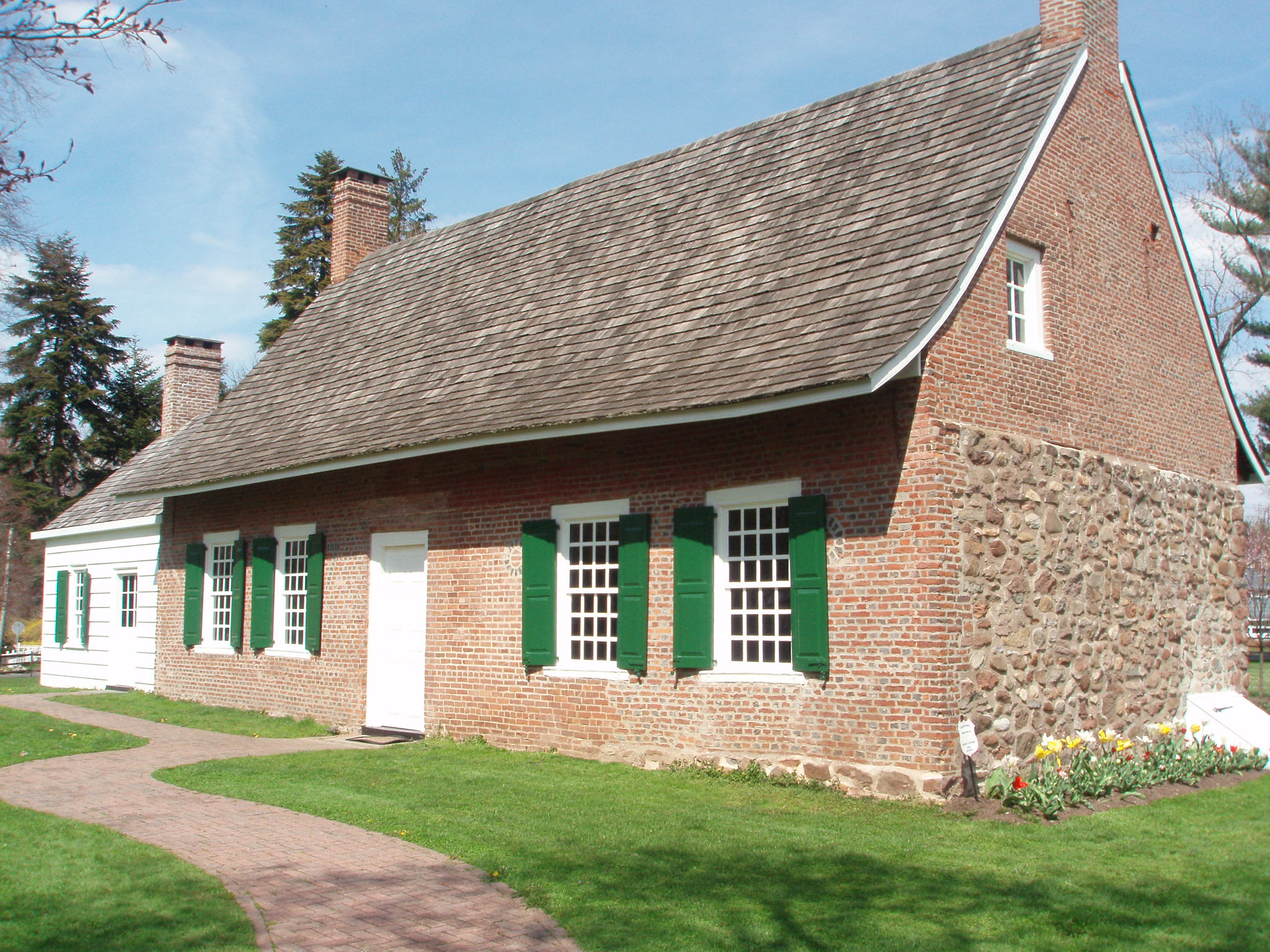
DeWint House

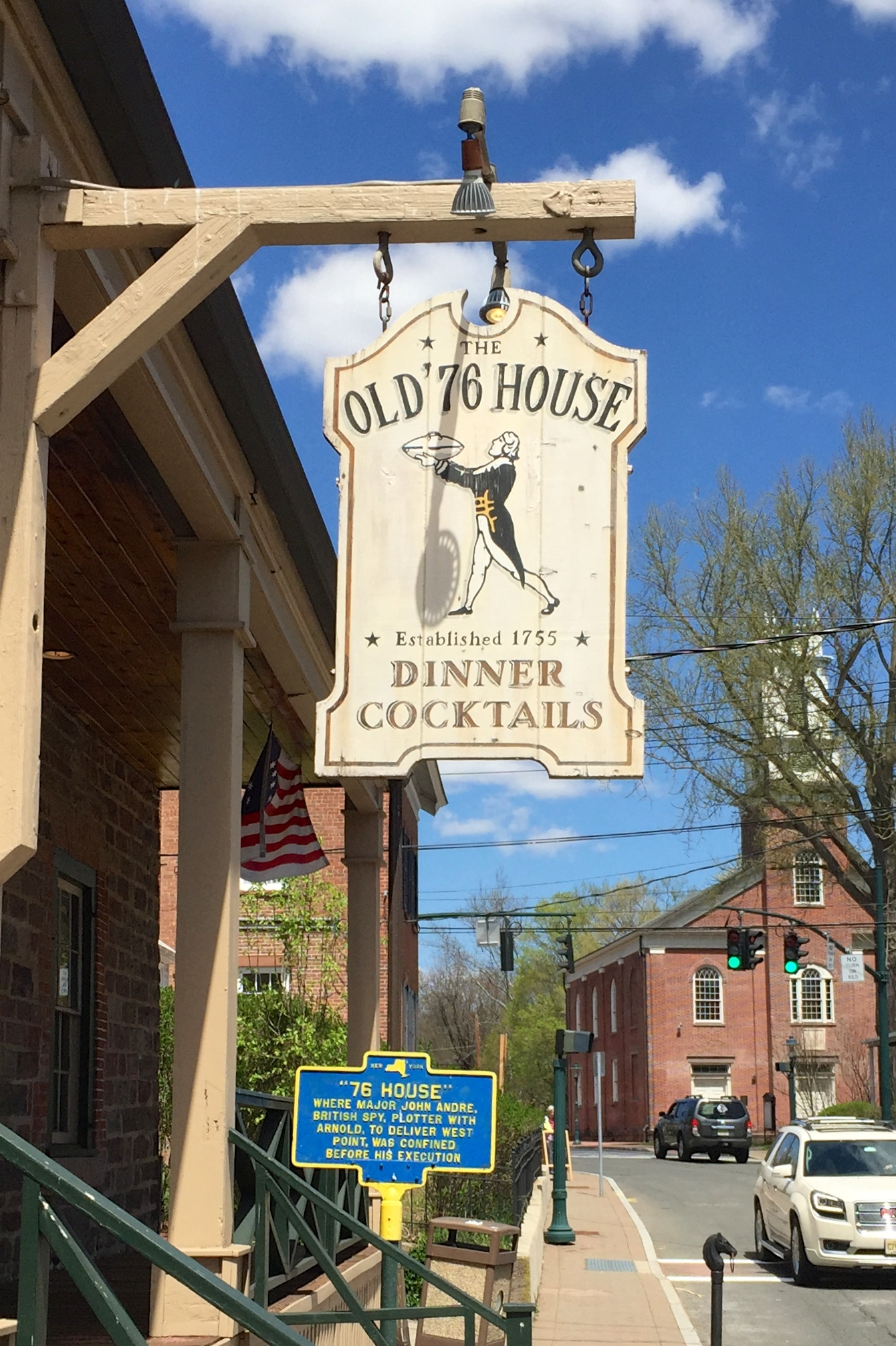
The Old '76 House, established 1755 – '76 House, where Major John André was confined

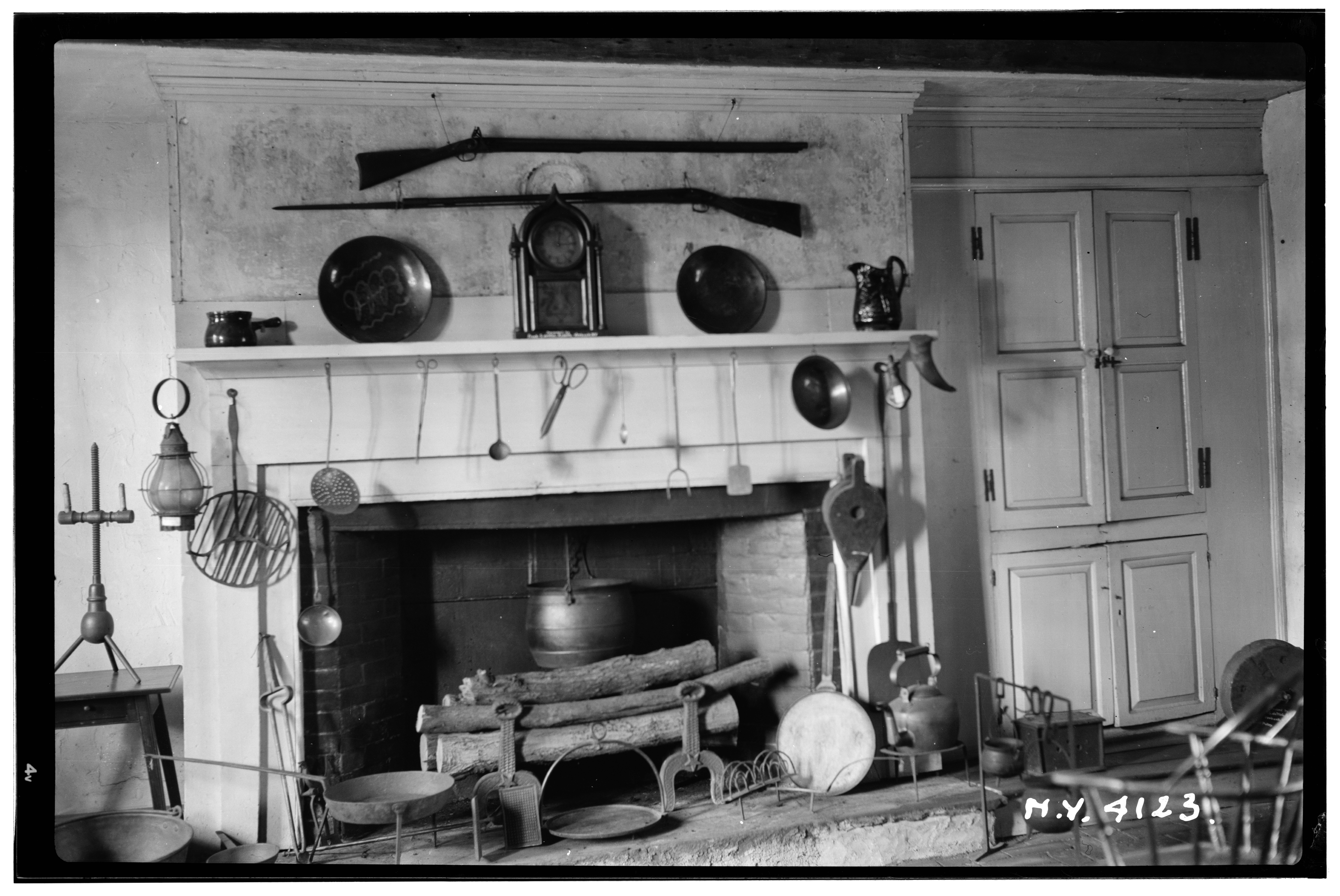
Inside DeWint House

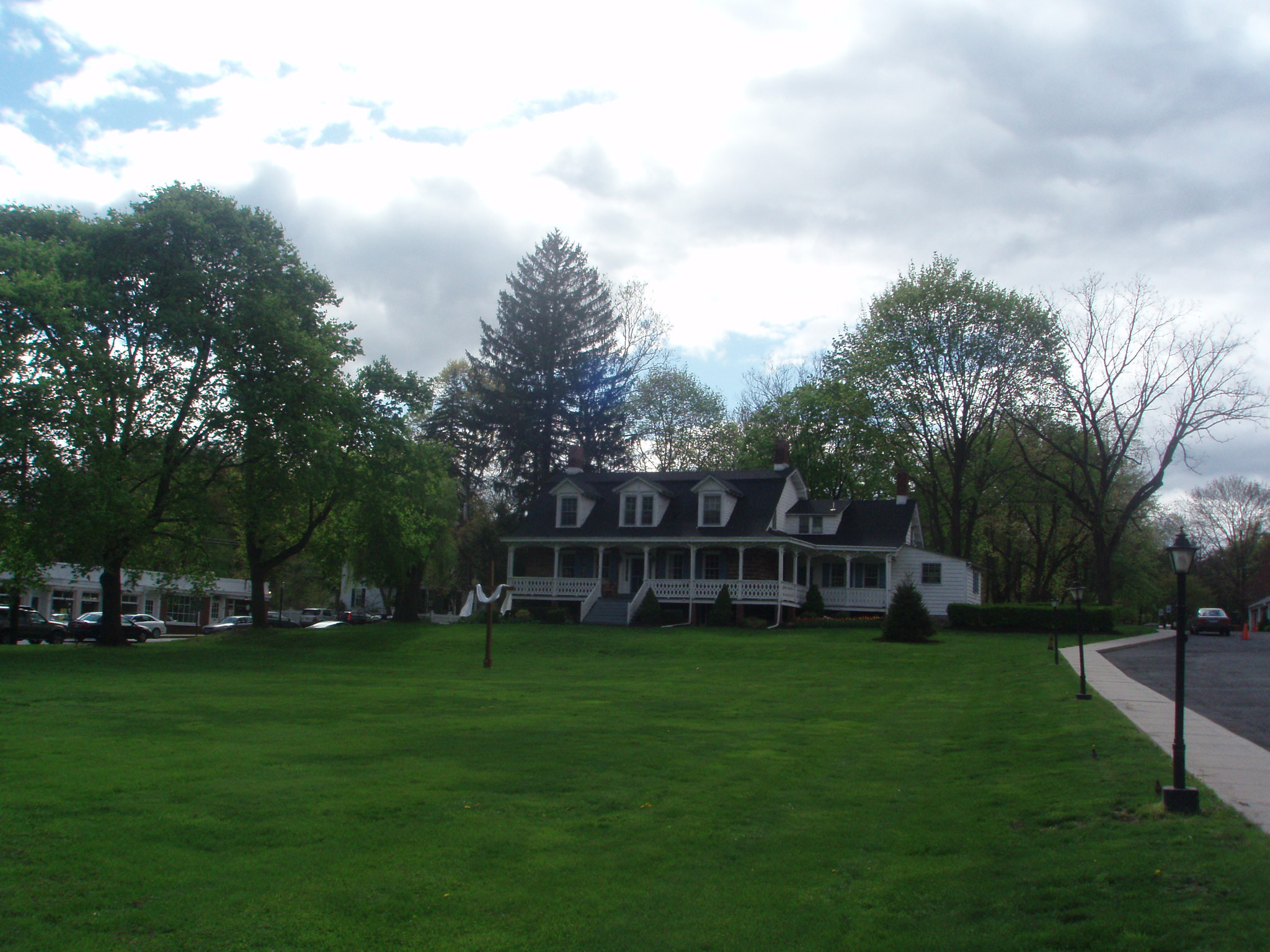
The Manse

- André Monument – André Hill, south of Old Tappan Road, 0.2 miles (0.32 km) west of railroad crossing – Marks the reported site of the execution of Major John André, hanged for espionage. (NRHP)
- The academy. Built in 1843 as a private school on land leased by the church.
- Bartow-Samett Town House – Built in 1835 by Morris Bartow. Adjacent to The Old 76 House. Probable site of Yost Mabie's house where the Orangetown Resolutions were signed in 1774.
- Bogert-Haring House – Late eighteenth century sandstone house which was home to nine generations of Bogerts and Harings.
- Burton Store – Tappan's former general store.
- Cardona House – First Rockland County schoolhouse. Built of stone and brick in 1711 on church land and used as a school until 1860.
- 1700 DeClark-DeWint House – 20 Livingston Street – Built in 1700, oldest house in Rockland County. To the northwest and northeast of the front entrance of the 1700 DeWint house are the carriage house and a stone mill. At the rear of house stand seven initialed headstones which came from a nearby property. It is believed these headstones marked where the slaves of that home were buried.(NRHP) Threatened with demolition in 1932, the house and grounds were purchased and preserved by the Grand Lodge of Free and Accepted Masons of the State of New York, as a National Historic Site and a memorial to George Washington (who was himself a lifelong Mason). Since 1984, in the month of September The Tappantown Historical Society has held Colonial Day featuring Colonial Army re-enactors and Encampment Soldiers. Tour of the DeWint house include ladies and gentlemen in colonial attire preparing for winter. The Carriage House Museum houses local artifacts. On the Dewint House Grounds people in colonial attire demonstrate apple pressing, buttermaking, Sheep shearing, blacksmith and cooper, spinning and other events showing how colonial ancestors lived.
- Haring-Adams House – Built in 1790. Cereo, first baby food, was manufactured by Macy Deming at this location.
- The Manse – Kings Highway & 28 Old Tappan Road – Built of stone in 1726 on land donated by five of the surviving 16 original Tappan patentees, Daniel deClerk, Peter Haring, Johannes Blauvelt, Lambert Smith and Cosyn Haring, the Manse is considered to be the oldest parsonage in continuous use in the United States. Architecture is typical Hudson Valley Dutch colonial, ornamentation on exterior being added later. Restructured 1788; frame wing added about 1830. There is a historical marker at this site. Reverend Samuel Verbryck, friend of George Washington and a founder of Rutgers University, resided here.
- Mabie-Beech House – Built in 1835 by Cornelius Mabie.
- The Old 76 House (Mabie's House)- 110 Main Street. Tavern since the 18th century.
- Reformed Church of Tappan – Kings Highway, 32 Old Tappan Road – Organized as Low Dutch Christian Reformed Church of Tappan 1694, it is the oldest congregation in Rockland County. The present church (third) was built in 1835. The second church, enlarged in 1788, was the scene of Major John André's trial. The church was also used as a prison/hospital after Baylor Massacre in 1778.
- Village Church Green – West of the Reformed Church of Tappan. This site was the first Orange County courthouse until 1798 (Rockland County was a part of Orange County). It was destroyed by fire along with the jail in 1773. The green had a whipping post and stocks, a stray cattle pound and during the American Revolution, a Liberty Pole (flag pole).
- Tappan Tar Barrel Elm site – located in the middle of Oak Tree Road just south of the Sparkill Creek. It was part of the Revolutionary War Alarm System. A flaming tar barrel was to be hoisted to the top of the tree if the British were to approach. It was used just once, in 1783, as a signal that Washington and Carleton agreed to a prisoner exchange and the evacuation of New York. It was cut down in 1953.
- Tappan Free Library – Built in 1750. Four additions have been added since.
- Tappan Historic District – (NRHP)
- Tappantown Historical Society

=== In popular culture ===
- Tappan was the filming site in the episode "New Car Smell" of the NBC comedy show, Ed. Ed was getting a kite down for a woman, but got stuck in a tree.
- A shot for the introduction to the film "No Looking Back" was shot in Tappan. The shot is facing east down Old Tappan Road from the perspective of Western Highway.
- Tappan was the location of the movie studio of Helen Gardner, who was the first film actor, male or female, to form her own production company. "The Helen Gardner Picture Players" made eleven feature films there between 1912 and 1914.

== Notable people ==
People who were born in, residents of, or otherwise closely associated with Tappan include:

- Nat Fein (1914–2000), photographer for the New York Herald Tribune for 33 years
- Cynthia Hesdra (1808–1879), former slave and businesswoman
- John Andre (1751–1780), British major and spy executed by hanging in Tappan
- John Quidor (1801-1881), American painter

== Transportation ==
The Palisades Interstate Parkway runs northwest–southeast to the north of Tappan. New York State Route 303 runs north–south through the area.

Until 1958, the New York Central Railroad operated passenger service on the West Shore Railroad between Weehawken, New Jersey, opposite Midtown Manhattan up through the western part of Tappan to Newburgh, Kingston and Albany. The service ran to West Haverstraw, in the north of Rockland County until 1959. The Erie Railroad ran train service on the Northern Branch through the eastern part of Tappan up to 1966.
