= George M. Beebe =

American politician (1836–1927)

George Monroe Beebe
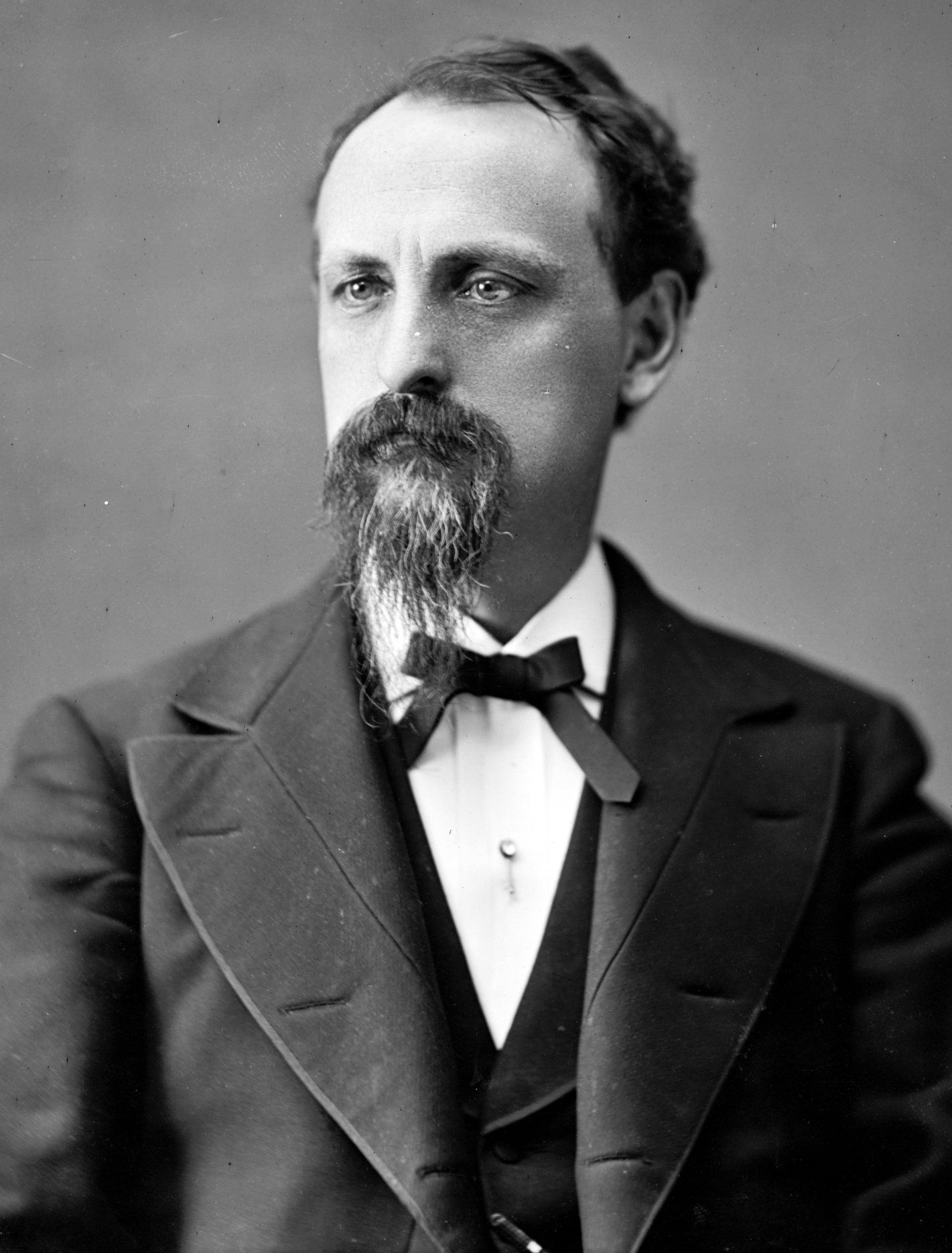

Member of the U.S. House of Representatives from New York's 14th district
- In office March 4, 1875 – March 3, 1879
- Preceded by: David M. De Witt
- Succeeded by: John W. Ferdon

Member of the New York State Assembly from the Sullivan County district
- In office January 1, 1873 – December 31, 1874
- Preceded by: Frank Buckley
- Succeeded by: Adolphus E. Wenzel

Acting Governor of Kansas Territory
- In office September 11, 1860 – November 26, 1860
- Preceded by: Samuel Medary
- Succeeded by: Samuel Medary
- In office December 17, 1860 – February 9, 1861
- Preceded by: Samuel Medary
- Succeeded by: Charles L. Robinson (State of Kansas)

Personal details
- Born: October 28, 1836 New Vernon, New York
- Died: March 1, 1927 (aged 90) Ellenville, New York
- Citizenship: United States
- Party: Democratic Party
- Spouses: Jessie H. Beebe; Jessie Millington Beebe
- Education: Albany Law School
- Profession: Lawyer; Politician; Judge

George Monroe Beebe (October 28, 1836 – March 1, 1927) was an American lawyer and politician who served two terms as a U.S. Representative from New York from 1875 to 1879.

== Biography ==
Born in New Vernon, New York, Beebe was the son of Primitive Baptist minister Gilbert Beebe and Pheobe Ann Cunningham Beebe. He attended the common schools, and Walkill Academy, Middletown, New York. He studied law and graduated from the Albany Law School in 1857. In 1861 he married Cornelia Foster of Monticello, New York.

== Career ==
Beebe was admitted to the bar in 1857 and commenced practice in Monticello, New York. He moved to Peoria, Illinois, in 1857 and became editor of the Central Illinois Democrat. He moved to Troy, Doniphan County, Kansas Territory, in 1858; and continued the practice of law, and served as member of the Territorial council in 1858 and 1859. He was appointed by President James Buchanan as secretary of the Territory in 1859 and was Acting Governor in 1860 and 1861.

Beebe moved to St. Joseph, Missouri, in 1861 and to Virginia City, Nevada, in 1863, continuing the practice of law. He was an unsuccessful candidate for associate judge of the State supreme court in 1865 and returned to Monticello, New York. He became editor of the Republican Watchman in 1866. An unsuccessful candidate for the State senate in 1871, he was a member of the New York State Assembly (Sullivan Co.) in 1873 and 1874. Commissioned by Governor Dix as chief of artillery with the rank of colonel in the Fifth Division, National Guard of New York, in 1873, he resigned in 1874 to enter Congress.

Elected as a Democrat to the Forty-fourth and Forty-fifth Congresses Beebe was U. S. Representative for the fourteenth district from March 4, 1875, to March 3, 1879. He served as chairman of the Committee on Expenditures in the Department of the Navy (Forty-fourth Congress), and was on the Committee on Mines and Mining (Forty-fifth Congress). An unsuccessful candidate for reelection in 1878 to the Forty-sixth Congress, he resumed his former newspaper pursuits.

A delegate to the Democratic National Conventions in 1876, 1880, and 1892, Beebe also served as member of the State court of claims from 1883 until 1900. He stayed in Monticello until 1892 when he moved to Ellenville, New York. He retired from active business pursuits in 1900.

== Death ==
Beebe died in Ellenville, New York, on March 1, 1927 (age 90 years, 124 days). He is interred at Woodlawn Cemetery, New Windsor, New York.

New York State Assembly
Preceded by Frank Buckley	New York State Assembly; Sullivan County; 1873-1874	Succeeded by Adolphus E. Wenzel
U.S. House of Representatives
Preceded by David M. De Witt	Representative of the 14th Congressional District of New York; March 4, 1875 – March 3, 1879	Succeeded by John W. Ferdon
