= New Vernon =

New Vernon may refer to:

- New Vernon, New Jersey
- New Vernon, New York
- New Vernon Township, Pennsylvania
