= John Van Dyke (politician) =

American judge (1807–1878)

Judge of the New Jersey Supreme Court
- In office 1859–1866

Member of the U.S. House of Representatives from New Jersey's 4th district
- In office March 4, 1847 – March 3, 1851
- Preceded by: Joseph E. Edsall
- Succeeded by: George H. Brown

Member of the Minnesota Senate
- In office 1872–1873

17th Mayor of New Brunswick, New Jersey
- In office 1846–1847
- Preceded by: Martin A. Howell
- Succeeded by: William H. Leupp

Personal details
- Born: April 3, 1807 Lamington, New Jersey, U.S.
- Died: December 24, 1878 (aged 71) Wabasha, Minnesota, U.S.
- Party: Whig
- Spouse: Mary Dix Strong
- Relations: W. S. Van Dyke (grandson); Theodore Strong (nephew)
- Parent(s): Abraham Van Dyke; Sarah Honeyman Van Dyke
- Profession: Politician

John Van Dyke (April 3, 1807 – December 24, 1878) was an American jurist and Whig Party politician who represented New Jersey's 4th congressional district in the United States House of Representatives from 1847 to 1851.

== Early life ==
He was born on April 3, 1807, in the Lamington section of Bedminster Township in Somerset County, New Jersey. He was a son of Abraham Van Dyke and Sarah (née Honeyman) Van Dyke.

After completing his preparatory and law studies, Van Dyke was admitted to the Bar in 1836.

== Career ==
He began practice in New Brunswick, New Jersey. In 1841, Van Dyke became prosecuting attorney of Middlesex County. A few years later, in 1846–1847, he served as president of the Bank of New Jersey at New Brunswick, while also serving as Mayor of New Brunswick, New Jersey.

Van Dyke's political career also began in 1847; he was elected to the Thirtieth and Thirty-first Congresses as a Whig. He served until March 3, 1851. Van Dyke declined re-nomination for another term, choosing instead to continue his law practice. He was a delegate to the 1856 Republican National Convention, and from 1859 to 1866 he served as a judge on the New Jersey Supreme Court.

In 1868, Van Dyke moved to Wabasha, Minnesota, where he went on to serve in the Minnesota Senate from 1872 to 1873 and a judge of the third judicial district from 1873 to 1878.

== Personal life ==
On October 7, 1841, Van Dyke was married to Mary Dix Strong (1819–1873), a daughter of prominent mathematician and professor Theodore Strong. His wife was the aunt of New Jersey State Senator Theodore Strong. Together, they were the parents of nine children, four of whom died in infancy:

- Theodore Strong Van Dyke (b. 1842), a Princeton graduate and lawyer who married Lois A. Funk.
- John Van Dyke (1844–1845), who died young.
- Abraham Van Dyke (1847–1848), who died young.
- John Van Dyke (1849–1850), who died young.
- Frederick William Van Dyke (b. 1852), a doctor who married Minnie E. Comstock in 1878.
- Robert Van Dyke (1854–1885), a lawyer who married Mary Westphal.
- John Charles Van Dyke (b. 1856), who was the librarian of Sage Library in New Brunswick, New Jersey.
- Mary Augusta Van Dyke (1859–1860), who died young.
- Woodbridge Strong Van Dyke (1862–1889), who married Laura Winston (1867–1951).

Van Dyke died in Wabasha, Minnesota, on December 24, 1878. He is interred in Wabasha's Riverview Cemetery.

=== Descendants ===
Through his son Woodbridge, he was the grandfather of film director and writer Woodbridge Strong Van Dyke II, (known as W. S. Van Dyke), who received two Academy Award nominations for Best Director.

U.S. House of Representatives
Preceded by Joseph E. Edsall	Member of the U.S. House of Representatives from New Jersey's 4th congressional district March 4, 1847 – March 3, 1851	Succeeded by George Houston Brown
