= Samuel S. Trott =

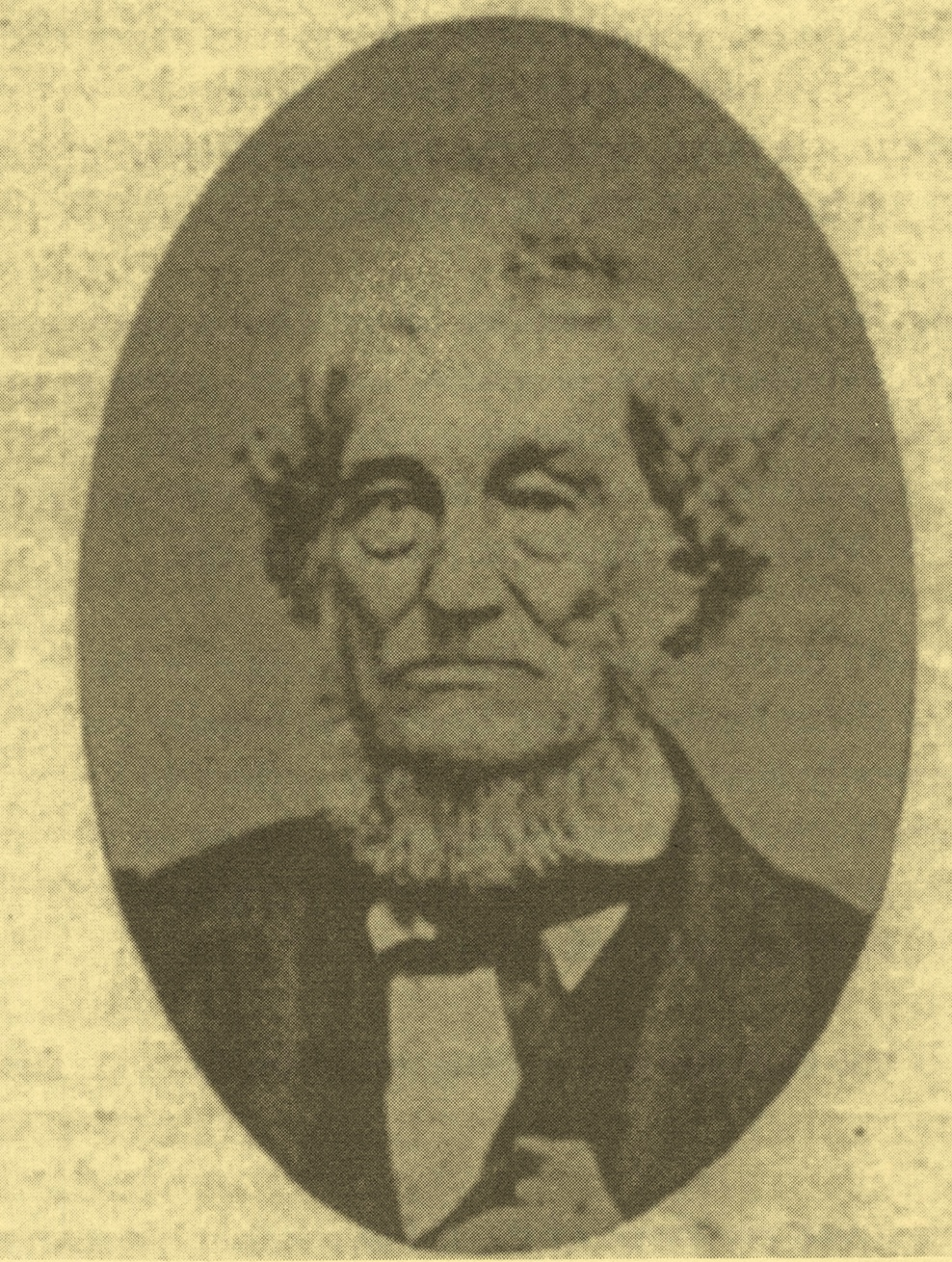
Samuel S. Trott (1783–1866)

Samuel S. Trott (1783 – 1866) was an American Baptist preacher, who was one of the writers of the Black Rock Address of 1832. Along with Gilbert Beebe, he was a leader in the Old School Baptist movement which disavowed any participation in the new extra-church societies being introduced into Baptist and Protestant churches in America and the United Kingdom from the late 1700s to the mid 1800s. These new missionary societies, Bible societies and Sunday schools were considered extra-biblical and not warranted by Christ and His Apostles.
