= Senator Doherty =

Senator Doherty may refer to:

- John Doherty (New York politician) (1826–1859), New York State Senate
- Michael J. Doherty (born 1963), New Jersey State Senate
- Pearse Doherty (born 1977), Senate of Ireland

== See also ==
- Senator Dougherty (disambiguation)
