= John W. Ferdon =

American politician (1825–1884)

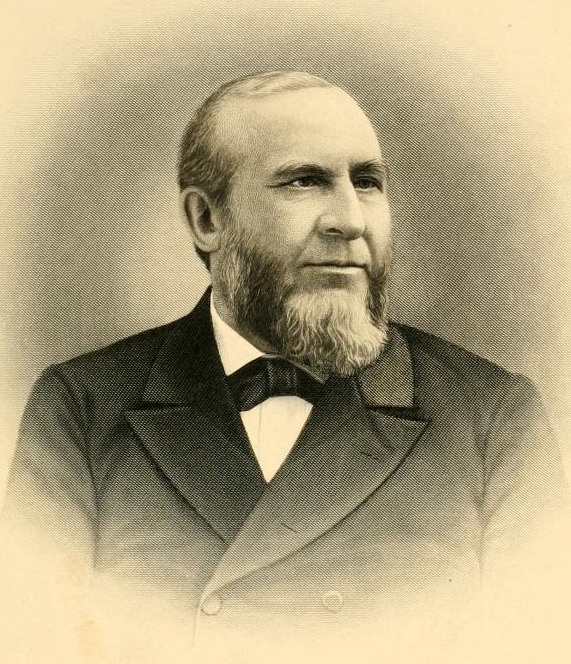

Member of the U.S. House of Representatives from New York's 14th district
- In office March 4, 1879 – March 3, 1881
- Preceded by: George M. Beebe
- Succeeded by: Lewis Beach

Member of the New York State Senate for the 7th District
- In office January 1, 1856 – December 31, 1857
- Preceded by: William H. Robertson
- Succeeded by: John Doherty

Member of the New York State Assembly for Rockland County
- In office January 1, 1855 – December 31, 1855
- Preceded by: John I. Suffern
- Succeeded by: Edward Whritenour

Personal details
- Born: December 13, 1826 Piermont, New York, U.S.
- Died: August 5, 1884 (aged 57) Monmouth Beach, New Jersey, U.S.
- Party: Know Nothing; Republican
- Education: Rutgers College

John William Ferdon (December 13, 1826 – August 5, 1884) was a U.S. representative from New York.

== Early life ==
Ferdon was born in Piermont, New York, on December 13, 1826. He was the son of William Ferdon (1787–1872) and Elizabeth (née Perry) Ferdon (1792–1869).

Ferdon graduated from Rutgers College in 1847. Then he studied law, was admitted to the bar, and practiced.

== Career ==
He was a Know Nothing member of the New York State Assembly (Rockland Co.) in 1855; and of the New York State Senate (7th D.) in 1856 and 1857.

He was delegate to the 1864 (where Abraham Lincoln was renominated for President) and 1876 Republican National Conventions (where Rutherford B. Hayes was nominated for President).

Ferdon was elected as a Republican to the 46th United States Congress, holding office from March 4, 1879, to March 3, 1881.

== Personal life ==
Ferndon was married to Harriet Strong (1825–1893), a daughter of prominent mathematician and professor Theodore Strong. His wife was the aunt of New Jersey State Senator Theodore Strong. Together, they were the parents of five children, three daughters and two sons:

- Lucy Dix Ferdon (1851–1896), who married Hoffman Rogers (1846–1912), a descendant of William Bayard Jr., in 1872.
- James Perry Ferdon (1856–1937).
- Elizabeth Perry Ferdon (1857–1896), who married George Matthew Gillies (1859–1918).
- Mary Van Dyke Ferdon (1860–1924), who married William Herbert Shaw (1857–1915).
- Theodore William Dwight Ferdon (1869–1904).

Ferdon died of kidney disease after an illness of six weeks on August 5, 1884, in Monmouth Beach, New Jersey. He was buried at a private cemetery on the Ferdon estate in Piermont, New York. His home at Piermont, known as Ferdon Hall was listed on the National Register of Historic Places in 2011.

New York State Assembly
Preceded by John I. Suffern	New York State Assembly; Rockland County; 1855	Succeeded by Edward Whritenour
New York State Senate
Preceded by William H. Robertson	New York State Senate; 7th District; 1856–1857	Succeeded by John Doherty
U.S. House of Representatives
Preceded by George M. Beebe	Member of the U.S. House of Representatives from New York's 14th congressional district 1879–1881	Succeeded by Lewis Beach
