= William Ferdon House =

Historic house in New York, United States

- U.S. National Register of Historic Places
- U.S. Historic district – Contributing property
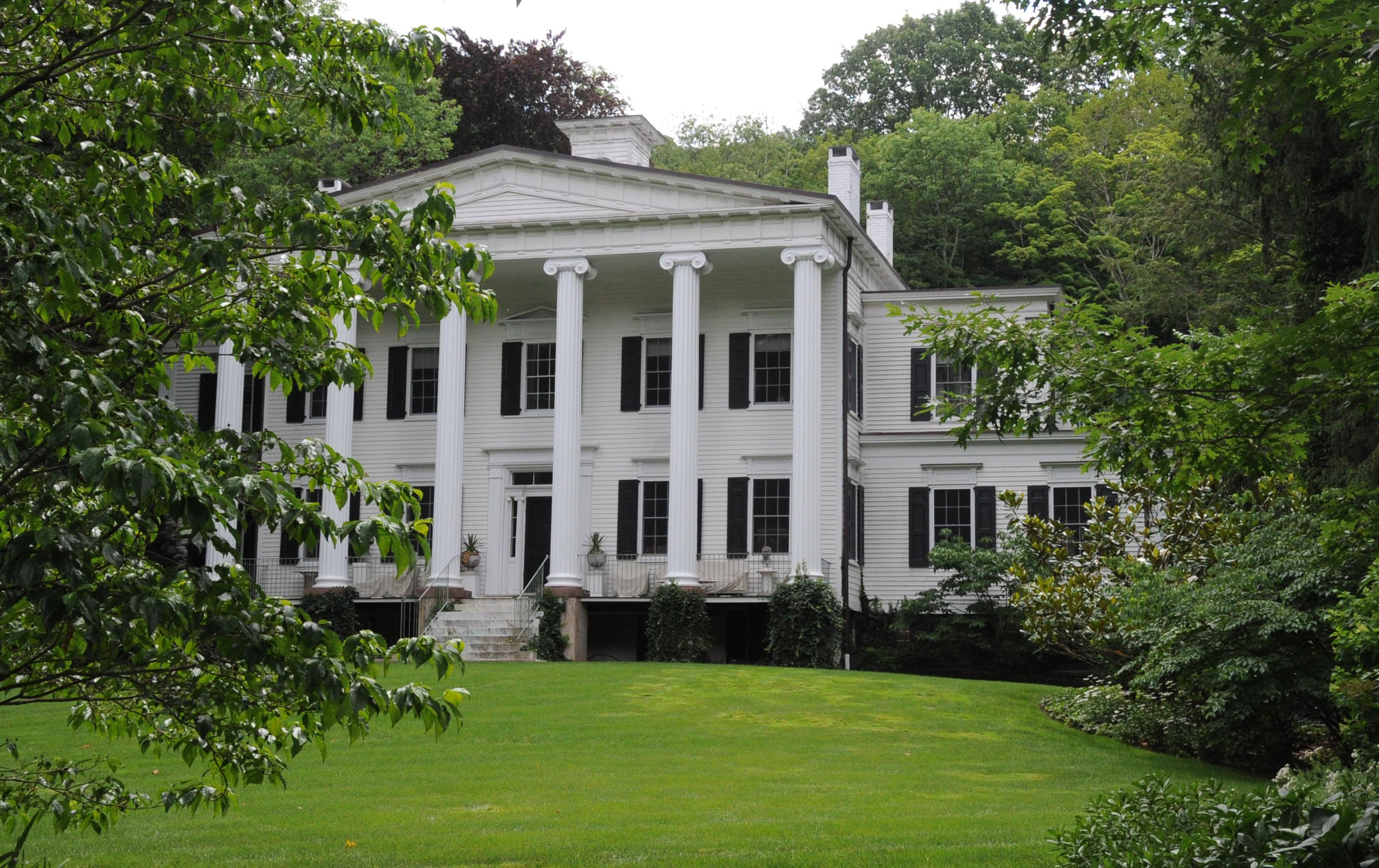

- Location within New York Location within the United States
- Location: 270 Ferdon Ave., Piermont, New York
- Coordinates: 41°02′06″N 73°55′08″W
- Area: 1.48 acres (0.60 ha)
- Built: c. 1835
- Architectural style: Greek Revival
- Part of: Rockland Road Bridge Historic District (ID11000709)
- NRHP reference No.: 11000292

Significant dates
- Added to NRHP: May 18, 2011
- Designated CP: September 29, 2011

William Ferdon House, also known as Ferdon Hall, is a historic home located at Piermont in Rockland County, New York. It was built about 1835, and is a two-story, Greek Revival style frame dwelling. It features a monumental front portico supported by six Ionic order columns. It has modern two-tiered flanking wings and a rear verandah. It was the home of U.S. Congressman John W. Ferdon (1826-1884).

It was listed on the National Register of Historic Places in 2011.
