= Richard B. Connolly =

Irish-American politician and Tweed Ring member (1810–1880)

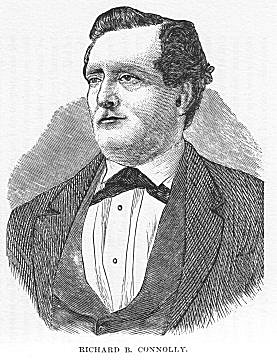

New York City Comptroller
- In office 1867 – November 18, 1871

Member of the New York Senate from the 7th district
- In office 1860–1863
- Preceded by: John Doherty
- Succeeded by: Thomas C. Fields

Clerk of New York County
- In office 1853–1858

Personal details
- Born: Richard Barrett Connolly; 1810 Dunmanway, County Cork, Ireland
- Died: May 30, 1880 (aged 69–70) Marseille, France
- Party: Democratic
- Spouse: Maria S. Townsend (m. 1837; died 1879)
- Children: 4
- Occupation: Politician, clerk

Richard Barrett Connolly (1810 – May 30, 1880), also known as "Slippery Dick", was an Irish-American politician from New York. He was a member of the New York State Senate and later the New York City Comptroller, and was a key figure in the infamous Tweed Ring. He died as a fugitive from justice in France.

== Early life ==
Connolly was born in 1810 in Dunmanway, County Cork, Ireland. He came to New York City in 1826 and worked first for auctioneers John Haggerty & Sons, and later for merchant Simeon Draper, Haggerty's son-in-law.

In 1837, Connolly married Maria S. Townsend (1816–1879), and the two had four children.

In 1845, Collector of the Port Cornelius Van Wyck Lawrence appointed Connolly as a clerk in the customs house. In 1849, he became a discount clerk at the Bank of North America.

== Political career ==
As a Tammany Hall Democrat, Connolly served as Clerk of New York County from 1853 to 1858.

He was a member of the New York State Senate (7th District) from 1860 to 1863, sitting in the 83rd, 84th, 85th, and 86th New York State Legislatures. Afterward, he became a discount clerk at the Central National Bank.

=== Tweed Ring and City Comptroller ===
Connolly was elected New York City Comptroller in 1867 and became a member of the infamous "Tweed Ring." Some newspaper writers referred to him at that time as "Slippery Dick."

He was re-appointed by Mayor A. Oakey Hall as City Comptroller under the "Tweed Charter" and remained in office until his resignation on November 18, 1871. A week later, Connolly was arrested and later indicted on 15 counts of misdemeanors.

On New Year's Day, 1872, he was released on bail by Judge George G. Barnard and went abroad, never to return to the United States.

== Death ==
Connolly died from Bright's disease on May 30, 1880, in Marseille, France, while a fugitive from justice. He was 70 years old.

New York State Senate
Preceded by John Doherty	New York State Senate; 7th District; 1860–1863	Succeeded by Thomas C. Fields
