= Theodore Strong =

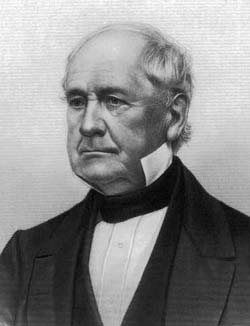
- Born: July 26, 1790; South Hadley, Massachusetts, U.S.
- Died: February 1, 1869 (aged 78); New Brunswick, New Jersey, U.S.
- Education: Yale College
- Occupation: Mathematician
- Spouse: Lucy Dix (m. 1818)
- Children: 7
- Parent(s): Joseph Strong; Sophia Woodbridge Strong
- Relatives: Maltby Strong (brother); Benjamin Ruggles Woodbridge (uncle)

Theodore Strong (July 26, 1790 – February 1, 1869) was an American mathematician.

== Early life ==
Strong was born in South Hadley, Massachusetts on July 26, 1790. He was the second son of Rev. Joseph Strong and Sophia (née Woodbridge) Strong. Through his paternal grandfather, also known as Rev. Joseph Strong, he was a direct descendant of Joseph Strong, who settled in Dorchester, Massachusetts in 1630, and through his maternal grandfather, Rev. John Woodbridge of South Hadley, he was a direct descendant of Governor Thomas Dudley, and Rev. John Woodbridge, who came to Massachusetts in 1634. His brother was Maltby Strong, mayor of Rochester, New York.

After his father's death, he was adopted by his wealthy unmarried uncle, Benjamin Ruggles Woodbridge, who raised him as his own son. Strong graduated from Yale College in 1812.

== Career ==
Upon his graduation he was appointed Tutor in Mathematics in Hamilton College, then just organized, and in 1816 he was made Professor of Mathematics and Natural Philosophy, and so remained until 1827, when he was called to a similar position in Rutgers College, New Brunswick, New Jersey, where he also served as the college's longtime vice president. Strong was elected an Associate Fellow of the American Academy of Arts and Sciences in 1832. He retired from Rutgers in 1863.

He published various mathematical papers in the first series of Silliman's Journal, and an Algebra of high order in 1859. A Treatise on the Differential and Integral Calculus was in press at the time of his death. He received the degree of Doctor of Laws from Rutgers College in 1835. He was one of fifty charter members of the National Academy of Sciences, to which he was formally named in 1863, shortly after the death of a son. Strong was also an associate of many other scientific bodies.

He was elected as a member of the American Philosophical Society in 1844.

== Personal life ==
On September 3, 1818, Dr. Strong was married Lucy Dix (1798–1875) of Littleton, Massachusetts. Lucy and her twin brother John Dix were children of Captain John Dix and Huldah (née Warren) Dix. Her sister, Mary Hartwell Warren was the wife of Asa Mahan, the 1st President of Oberlin College. Together, Theodore and Lucy were the parents of seven children, two sons and five daughters:

- Mary Dix Strong (1819–1873), who married U.S. Representative John Van Dyke.
- Sophia Woodbridge Strong (b. 1821), who married Richard Hasluck.
- Sarah Bowers Strong (1823–1839), who died young.
- Harriet Strong (1825–1893), who married U.S. Representative John W. Ferdon.
- Benjamin Ruggles Woodbridge Strong (1827–1907), who married Harriet Anna Hartwell (1827–1909).
- Lucy Dix Strong (1832–1834), who died young.
- Theodore Strong Jr. (1836–1863), who died in Belle Plains, Virginia while serving with the Union Army.

Strong resided in New Brunswick until his death, which took place on February 1, 1869. He was survived by his wife, one son and two daughters.

=== Descendants ===
Through his son Woodbridge, he was a grandfather of New Jersey State Senator, Theodore Strong, who married Cornelia Livingston Van Rensselaer, parents of prominent lawyer, Stephen Van Rensselaer Strong.
