= Senator Dougherty =

Senator Dougherty may refer to:

- Charles F. Dougherty (born 1937), Pennsylvania State Senate
- Charles Dougherty (Florida politician) (1850–1915), Florida State Senate
- John Dougherty (Illinois politician) (1806–1879), Ohio State Senate
- Pat Dougherty (born 1948), Missouri State Senate

== See also ==
- Senator Doherty (disambiguation)
