= Rockland Road Bridge Historic District =

Historic district in New York, United States

- U.S. National Register of Historic Places
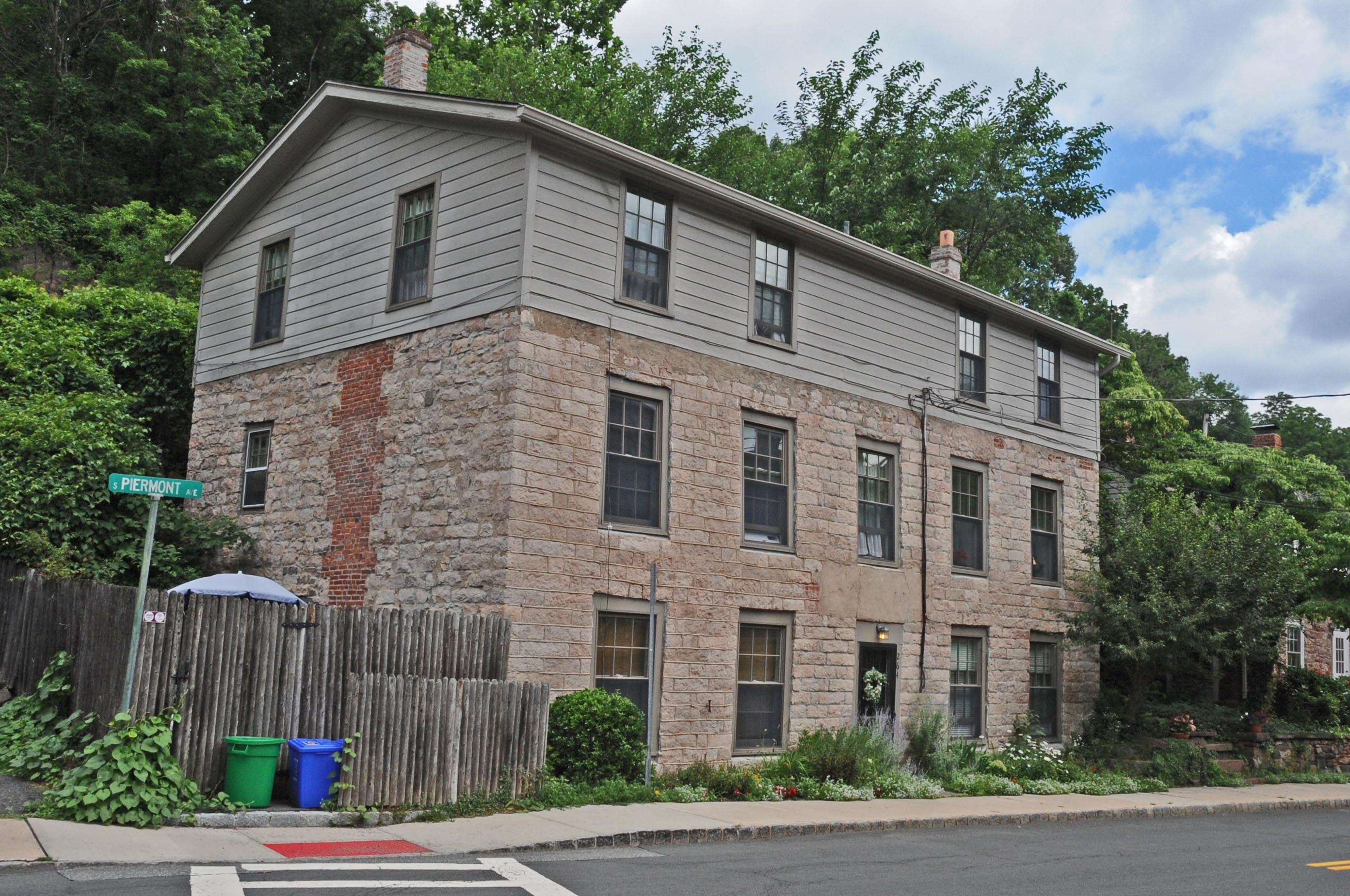
- 264 Piermont Avenue

- Location within New York Location within the United States
- Location: Ferdon Ave., Rockland Rd. & S. Piermont Ave., Piermont, New York
- Coordinates: 41°02′06″N 73°55′10″W
- Area: 5.38 acres (2.18 ha)
- Built: c. 1785-1940
- Architect: Hand, William
- Architectural style: Federal, Greek Revival, Italianate, Second Empire
- NRHP reference No.: 11000709
- Added to NRHP: September 29, 2011

Rockland Road Bridge Historic District is a national historic district located at Piermont in Rockland County, New York. The district encompasses 12 contributing buildings and 8 contributing structures in the village of Piermont. It developed between about 1785 and 1940, and includes representative examples of Federal, Greek Revival, Italianate, and Second Empire style architecture. Located in the district are the separately listed William Ferdon House, Haddock's Hall, and the Rockland Road Bridge. Other notable buildings and structures include the Sparkill Pump House and Dam (c. 1940), "Protection Engine Company" (c. 1854 and later), and The Mine Hole.

It was listed on the National Register of Historic Places in 2011.
