= Gilbert Beebe =

Primitive Baptist printer & editor

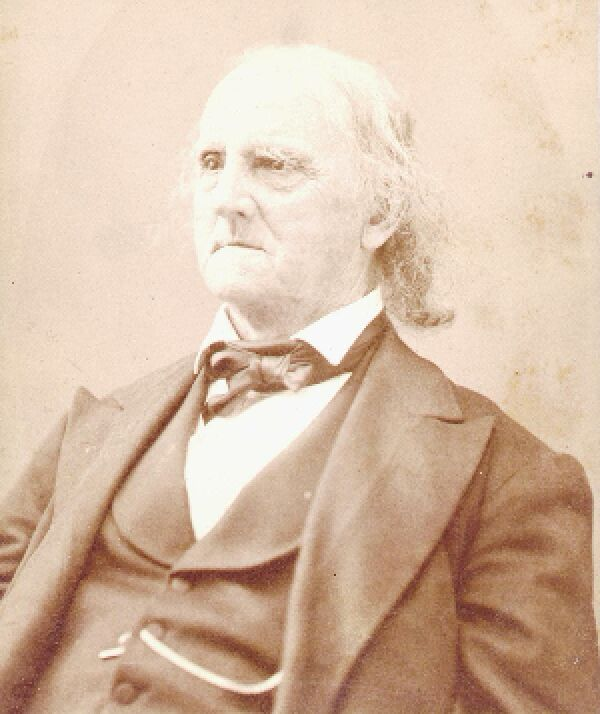
Portrait of Gilbert Beebe

Gilbert Beebe (1800–1881) was an American Baptist minister (of the Old School, Particular or often referred to as the Primitive Baptist Persuasion); a printer and editor, (founded the Signs of the Times periodical) and was, for 35 years, Pastor of the New Vernon Primitive Baptist Church of New York. Through his periodical, the SIGNS OF THE TIMES, 1832-2010, he became the leading voice of the Primitive Baptists in the United States.

== Biography ==
Gilbert Beebe, (according to his brief autobiography, as published in the April, 1876 Edition of the Signs of the Times), was born in Norwich, Connecticut, on November 25, 1800. He joined the Baptist Church at Norwich in 1811, and was baptized by Elder John Stipp. In 1816 he moved to New York City and joined Ebenezer Baptist Church, where he was called upon to exercise his gift of Preaching the Gospel. He was finally licensed to preach the Gospel in 1818 and spent several years traveling to various States as an itinerant preacher, supplying the Third Baptist Church, Baltimore, Maryland for three or four months in about 1821-22. In February, 1823, he was married in the City of New York, to Phebe Ann Cunningham and in the same year was ordained pastor of the Baptist Church at Ramapo, New York, and continued there until May, 1826. He was then called to the pastorate of the Baptist Church at New Vernon, New York, becoming only the second pastor of the church since its constitution in 1786. This, and the Middletown and Wallkill Church, was to be the scene of his labors except for three years in Alexandria, Virginia, also serving the Broad Run, Virginia, Church and Shiloh Church in Washington, D.C. He continued, however, during this time to go to New Vernon which he served until his death in 1881.

According to the 1870 Census, (Middletown, New York), he was 69 and earning $35,000 a year, (from his Printing Business), which compared with a physician (who on the average made about $8000.00 per year), was a considerable amount.

Sylvester Hassell in his History of the Church of God, on page 822, had this to say. “Elder Gilbert Beebe, of Middletown, N.Y., has had few equals, since the days of the apostles, in natural and spiritual abilities, in bold and faithful defense, both by tongue and pen, of great fundamental truths of the Scriptures, and in the extensiveness of his ministerial labors. During his long ministry of sixty-three years he is believed to have preached about 10,000 sermons and traveled about 200,000 miles – sent forth, not in the manner of the nineteenth century, by “Missionary Funds,” but in the manner of the first century, by the God of Grace and Providence.”

=== Death ===
His obituary which appeared in the May 3, 1881 edition of the New York Times, had this to say: “When the Division in the Baptist Churches took place, nearly 50 years ago, (written in 1881), and the Fullerites (named after Andrew Fuller) or New School Baptist, separated, Elder Beebe remained with the Primitive Body, and became its leading advocate ... as a Preacher he was remarkable for power, having a profound knowledge of the Scriptures, and was a vigorous writer ... he retained his physical powers and mental vigor to the last, preaching the day before his death. His wife and several children survive him.”

=== Writings ===
Most of his extensive writings are as applicable now as when they were written. These were confined to his periodical, THE SIGNS OF THE TIMES, to which he, in every issue, contributed an editorial article, from its inception in 1832 to the time of his death in 1881. The SIGNS OF THE TIMES continued well after his departure, and was still being published on a monthly basis up until sometime in 2010. A Compilation of his Editorial Writings, as copied from the SIGNS OF THE TIMES, were published in 1868 (Volume 1) and 1874 (Volume 2) and these were reprinted along with 5 Additional Volumes (between the years 1984-2000) by Welsh Tract Publications, located in Salisbury, Maryland. A Hymn Book, which he compiled, entitled THE BAPTIST HYMN BOOK, was published in 1873. Its title page sets forth the following description: The Baptist Hymn Book Comprising a Large and Choice Collection of Psalms, Hymns and Spiritual Songs, adapted to the Faith and Order of the Old School or Primitive Baptists in the United States of America, carefully selected from various Authors, and published by Gilbert Beebe. This also was republished in 1991 by Welsh Tract Publications, Salisbury, Maryland.
