= David M. De Witt =

American politician

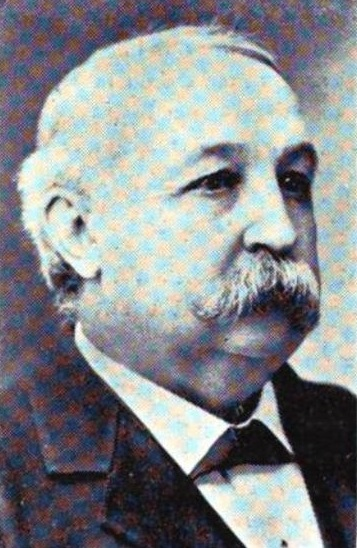

New York State Assembly (Ulster Co., 2nd D.)
- In office 1883

Member of the U.S. House of Representatives from New York's 14th district
- In office March 4, 1873 – March 3, 1875
- Preceded by: Eli Perry
- Succeeded by: George M. Beebe

District attorney of Ulster County
- In office 1863–1870

Personal details
- Born: November 25, 1837 Paterson, New Jersey, United States
- Died: June 23, 1912 (aged 74) Kingston, New York, United States
- Resting place: Wiltwyck Rural Cemetery
- Party: Democratic
- Education: Rutgers College
- Occupation: Attorney, politician

David Miller De Witt (November 25, 1837 – June 23, 1912) was an American lawyer and politician who served one term as a U.S. Representative from New York from 1873 to 1875.

== Early life and family ==
Born in Paterson, New Jersey, he was the son of Moses Edwards and Lydia Ann (Miller) DeWitt. His father was from Rosendale, New York and his mother from Hunterdon County, New Jersey. His father was a merchant who had moved to New Jersey around 1823 or 1824. His first wife, whom he married October 4, 1826 in Paterson, New Jersey, was Margaret Salome Goetschius (1791-1833), who was also an Ulster County native and was his third cousin. They had two children, Charles DuBois DeWitt and Catherine DeWitt.

His father married a second time, to Lydia, on September 8, 1835 in Clinton, New Jersey. Lydia was the daughter of David and Elizabeth (Welsh) Miller, and younger sister of United States Congressman from New Jersey Jacob W. Miller. David was the oldest of the children born to Moses and Lydia, with his younger full siblings being William Cantine DeWitt, John Henry DeWitt, Thomas DeWitt and Elizabeth DeWitt.

De Witt moved to New York in 1845 with his parents, who settled in Brooklyn. As a youth, De Witt attended the public schools of Brooklyn, a select school at Saugerties, and the local academy at Kingston.

== Schooling and Law career ==
He was graduated from Rutgers College, New Brunswick, New Jersey, in 1858, where he studied law. De Witt was admitted to the bar in 1858 and commenced practice in Kingston, New York. Principal of New Paltz Academy (later a State normal school) in 1861 and 1862. He served as district attorney of Ulster County 1863–1870. He was an unsuccessful candidate for reelection.

=== Congress ===
De Witt was elected as a Democrat to the Forty-third Congress (March 4, 1873 – March 3, 1875). He was not a candidate for renomination.

=== Later career and death ===
He resumed the practice of law and also engaged in literary pursuits, including The Judicial Murder of Mary E. Surratt (1895), The Assassination of Abraham Lincoln (1898), and The impeachment and Trial of Andrew Johnson (1903). From 1878 to 1881, he served as assistant corporation counsel of Brooklyn, New York He was a member of the New York State Assembly (Ulster Co., 2nd D.) in 1883. Corporation counsel of Kingston in 1884. Surrogate of Ulster County from November 20, 1885, to December 31, 1886.

He again engaged in the practice of law.

He died in Kingston, New York, June 23, 1912 and was interred in Wiltwyck Rural Cemetery in Kingston.

== Personal life ==
On April 10, 1867, De Witt married Mary Antoinette MacDonald (1844-1923) in New Brunswick, New Jersey. She was the daughter of Richard MacDonald (1803-1894), who served as mayor of New Brunswick from 1863 to 1865. David and Mary had four sons:

- Richard De Witt (1871-1903)
- William Cantine De Witt (1873-1951); served as the Ulster County Clerk from 1913 to 1916
- David Miller De Witt Jr. (1876-1918)
- Macdonald De Witt (1878-1967); graduated in 1901 from New York Law School, and was active as a lawyer in Kingston, New York. He was instrumental in the establishment of SUNY Ulster, and the library there is named for him

De Witt's grandfather, John Charles DeWitt (1755-1833), was a New York State Assemblyman for several terms and the town supervisor of Hurley, New York multiple times. His great-grandfather was Charles DeWitt; he is also a distant cousin of New York Governor DeWitt Clinton through the DeWitt family, as well as a descendant of Louis DuBois.

His uncle, Matthew Cantine DeWitt, served as Marbletown, New York town supervisor in 1843; his uncle, William Henry Romeyn (who married his aunt Mary Margaret DeWitt) was postmaster of Kingston, New York from 1849 to 1853. His first cousin was George Macculloch Miller.

== See also ==
- United States Congress. "David M. De Witt (id: D000285)". Biographical Directory of the United States Congress.

U.S. House of Representatives
Preceded by Eli Perry	Member of the U.S. House of Representatives from New York's 14th congressional district 1873–1875	Succeeded by George M. Beebe
New York State Assembly
Preceded by Eugene F. Patten	New York State Assembly; Ulster County, 2nd District; 1883	Succeeded by Gilbert D. B. Hasbrouck
