= Maltby Strong =

American politician (1796–1878)

Mayor of Rochester, New York
- In office 1855–1856
- Preceded by: John Williams
- Succeeded by: Charles J. Hayden

Personal details
- Born: November 24, 1796 Heath, Massachusetts, U.S.
- Died: August 5, 1878 (aged 81) Rochester, New York, U.S.
- Resting place: Salem, Massachusetts, U.S.
- Party: Whig
- Spouse: Eliza B. Sprague (m. 1835)
- Relatives: Theodore Strong (brother)
- Education: Yale College; Yale Medical School; Harvard University; Bowdoin College (MD)
- Occupation: Physician; businessman; politician

Maltby Strong (November 24, 1796 – August 5, 1878) was an American medical doctor, businessman, and politician. He was mayor of Rochester, New York, from 1855 to 1856.

== Early life ==
Maltby Strong was born on November 24, 1796, in Heath, Massachusetts, as the fourth son of Sophia (née Woodbridge) and Joseph Strong. His father was a reverend of the Congregational Church and graduate of Yale College. His brother was mathematician Theodore Strong. They lived over the church in Heath. He graduated from Yale in 1819 and his two older brothers also graduated from Yale. He attended a course of lectures at Yale Medical School. He then entered the office of his brother, Dr. Woodbridge Strong, of Boston, as a student, and attended two courses of lectures at Harvard University. In 1822, he accompanied Dr. Nathan Smith, the head of the Yale Medical School to Brunswick, Maine, as a private pupil and surgical assistant in a course of lectures, and while there received the degree of M.D. from Bowdoin College.

== Career ==
Strong began practicing medicine in South Hadley. In 1831, he removed to Rochester, New York, where he continued to practice medicine. In 1832, he engaged in the business of milling flour and later of cotton in connection with his eldest brother, Joseph Strong. He purchased and sold real estate for a time, including Hawley Farm, several hundreds of acres of land that became part of Rochester. He conducted business with his brother until his brother died in 1847 and then he returned to practicing medicine. He retired around 10 years prior to his death. He was a member of the committee that established Mount Hope Cemetery.

Strong was a Whig. In 1854, he was elected mayor of Rochester, and held the office for one term. He worked on the improvement of education in Rochester, including being one of the founders of the Rochester Female Academy. During his tenure, the Exchange Street Canal Bridge was demolished and a swing bridge was constructed to replace it.

== Personal life ==
Strong married Eliza B. Sprague, daughter of Joseph E. Sprague, of Salem, Massachusetts, on September 9, 1835. They had no children.

Strong died on August 5, 1878, in Rochester. He was buried in Salem.
