= Haddock's Hall =

Historic commercial building in New York, United States

- U.S. National Register of Historic Places
- U.S. Historic district – Contributing property
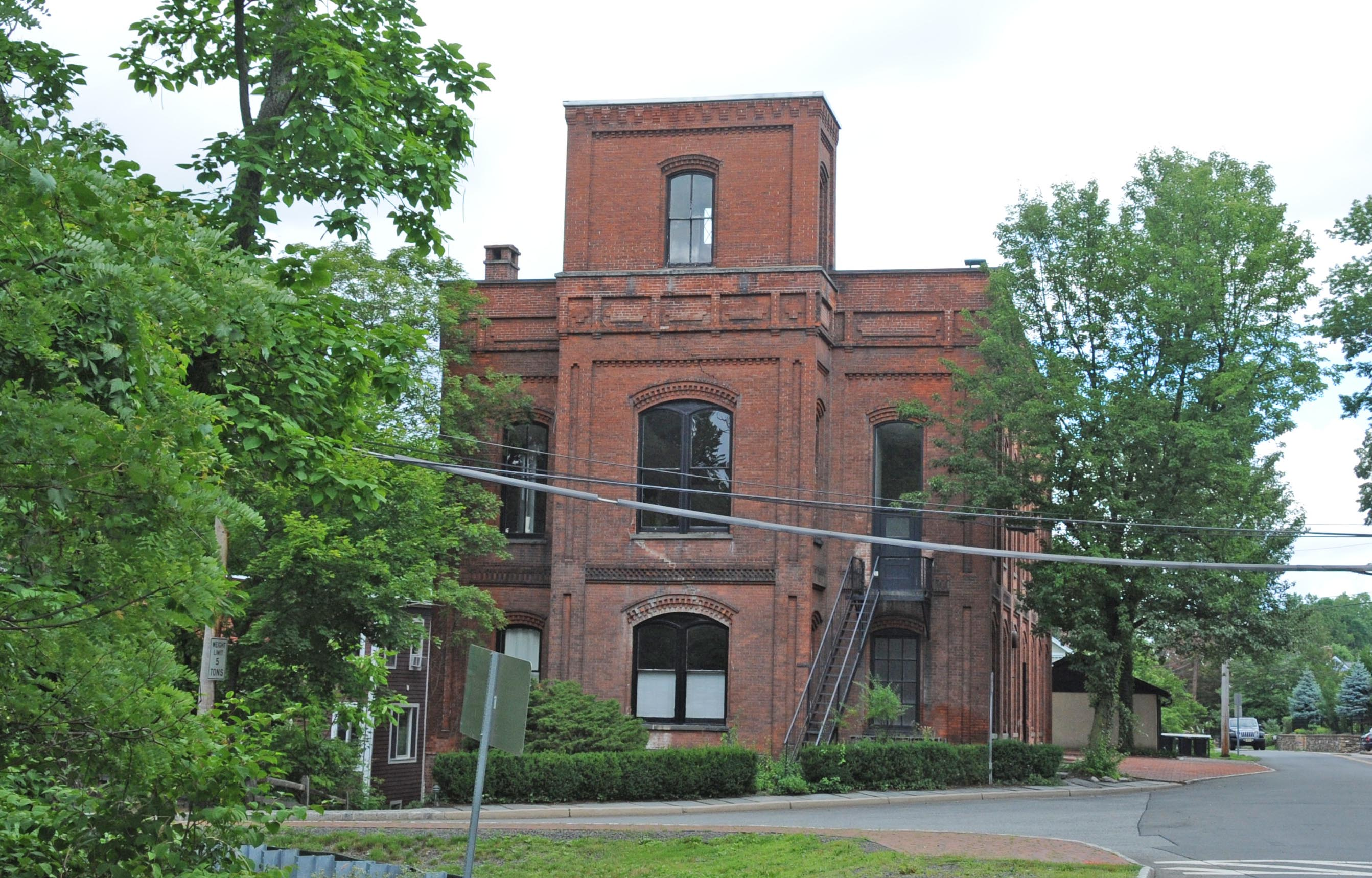

- Location within New York Location within the United States
- Location: 300 Ferdon Ave., Piermont, New York
- Coordinates: 41°2′7″N 73°55′8″W
- Area: 0.5 acres (0.20 ha)
- Built: 1875
- Architect: Hand, William
- Architectural style: Neo-Grec
- Part of: Rockland Road Bridge Historic District (ID11000709)
- NRHP reference No.: 91000103

Significant dates
- Added to NRHP: June 20, 1991
- Designated CP: September 29, 2011

Haddock's Hall is an historic commercial building located at Piermont in Rockland County, New York, United States. It was built about 1875 and is a two-story, three bay wide, brick commercial / civic building. It features a three-story tower. It was originally constructed for use as a store, warehouse, and village hall.

The building was commissioned by Roger Haddock (1827–1891) from his brother-in-law William Henry Hand (1837–1898). Haddock started his business in 1857 in a store first established by Major Taulman. The current brick structure replaced the old store and was reputed to be the largest general store in Rockland County.

The store was closed and the contents auctioned after Haddock's death.

In 1900 it became the Hasbrouck Motor Works, making motors for yachts. And then from 1926 until 1975 a silk mill operated by the Buser Silk Company and later the Miesch Silk Manufacturing Co. that produced ribbons for military decorations and rip cords for parachutes.

The building is now divided into residential apartments.

It was listed on the National Register of Historic Places in 1991.
