= Woodbridge's Regiment of Militia =

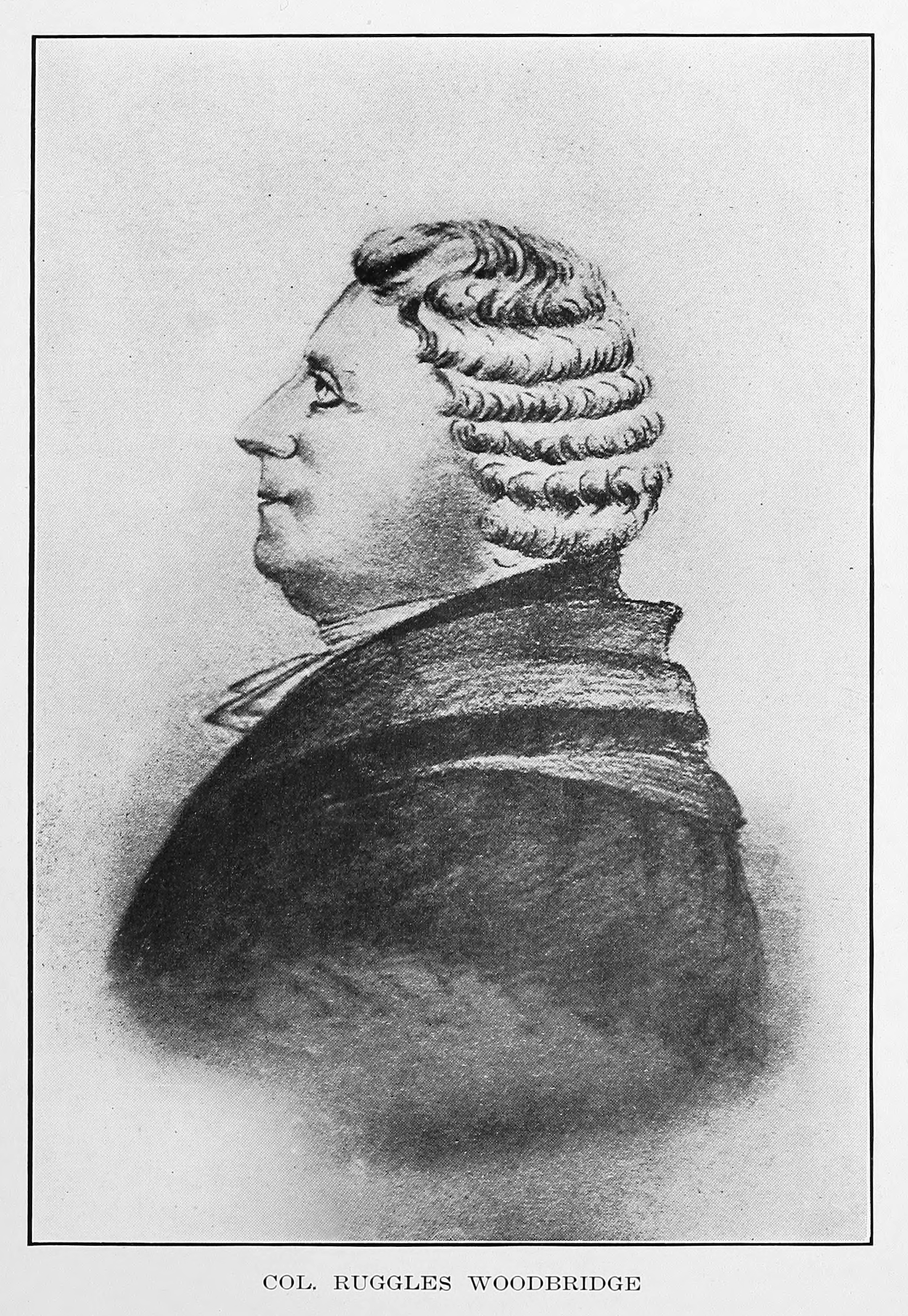
- Benjamin Ruggles Woodbridge
- Active: 1775–1777
- Allegiance: State of Massachusetts
- Type: Infantry
- Part of: Massachusetts militia
- Engagements: Saratoga Campaign

Commanders
- Notable commanders: Benjamin Ruggles Woodbridge, William Stacy

Woodbridge's Regiment of Militia, also known as the "1st Hampshire County Militia Regiment" and "Woodbridge's (25th) Regiment" and "The 25th Regiment of Foot". On April 20, 1775, the day immediately following the Battles of Lexington and Concord, Woodbridge's regiment was formed and marched to Cambridge, Massachusetts near Boston, and participated in the siege of Boston and the Battle of Bunker Hill.

The regiment spent part of the summer and the fall of 1776 as part of the Fort Ticonderoga garrison. The next year the regiment was called up at South Hadley, Massachusetts on August 16, 1777 as reinforcements for the Continental Army during the Saratoga Campaign. The regiment marched quickly to join the gathering forces of General Horatio Gates as he faced British General John Burgoyne in northern New York. The regiment served in General Warner's brigade. With the surrender of Burgoyne's Army on October 17, the regiment was disbanded on November 29, 1777.
