= John Doherty (New York politician) =

American politician (1826–1859)

Member of the New York Senate from the 7th district
- In office 1858–1859
- Preceded by: John W. Ferdon
- Succeeded by: Richard B. Connolly

Member of the New York City Board of Aldermen from the 19th Ward
- In office 1852–1853

Personal details
- Born: January 16, 1826 New York City, New York, U.S.
- Died: April 20, 1859 (aged 33) Albany, New York, U.S.
- Party: Democratic
- Parent: Patrick Doherty (father)
- Occupation: Lawyer, politician

John Doherty (January 16, 1826 – April 20, 1859) was an American politician from New York. He served in the New York State Senate in 1858 and 1859, representing the 7th District.

== Early life and legal career ==
Doherty was born on January 16, 1826, in New York City. He was the son of Patrick Doherty (1794–1849), who came from Ireland to New York City about 1811 and fought in the War of 1812.

Doherty studied law, was admitted to the bar in 1847, and commenced practice in New York City. After the death of his father, he abandoned the law and looked after his father's business instead.

== Political career ==
Doherty was a member of the New York City Board of Aldermen (19th Ward) in 1852 and 1853.

He was a member of the New York State Senate (7th District) in 1858 and 1859.

== Death ==
Doherty died on April 20, 1859, in Albany, New York, the day after the Legislature adjourned. He never married.

New York State Senate
Preceded by John W. Ferdon	New York State Senate; 7th District; 1858–1859	Succeeded by Richard B. Connolly
