= Benjamin Ruggles Woodbridge =

18th and 19th-century American military officer and politician

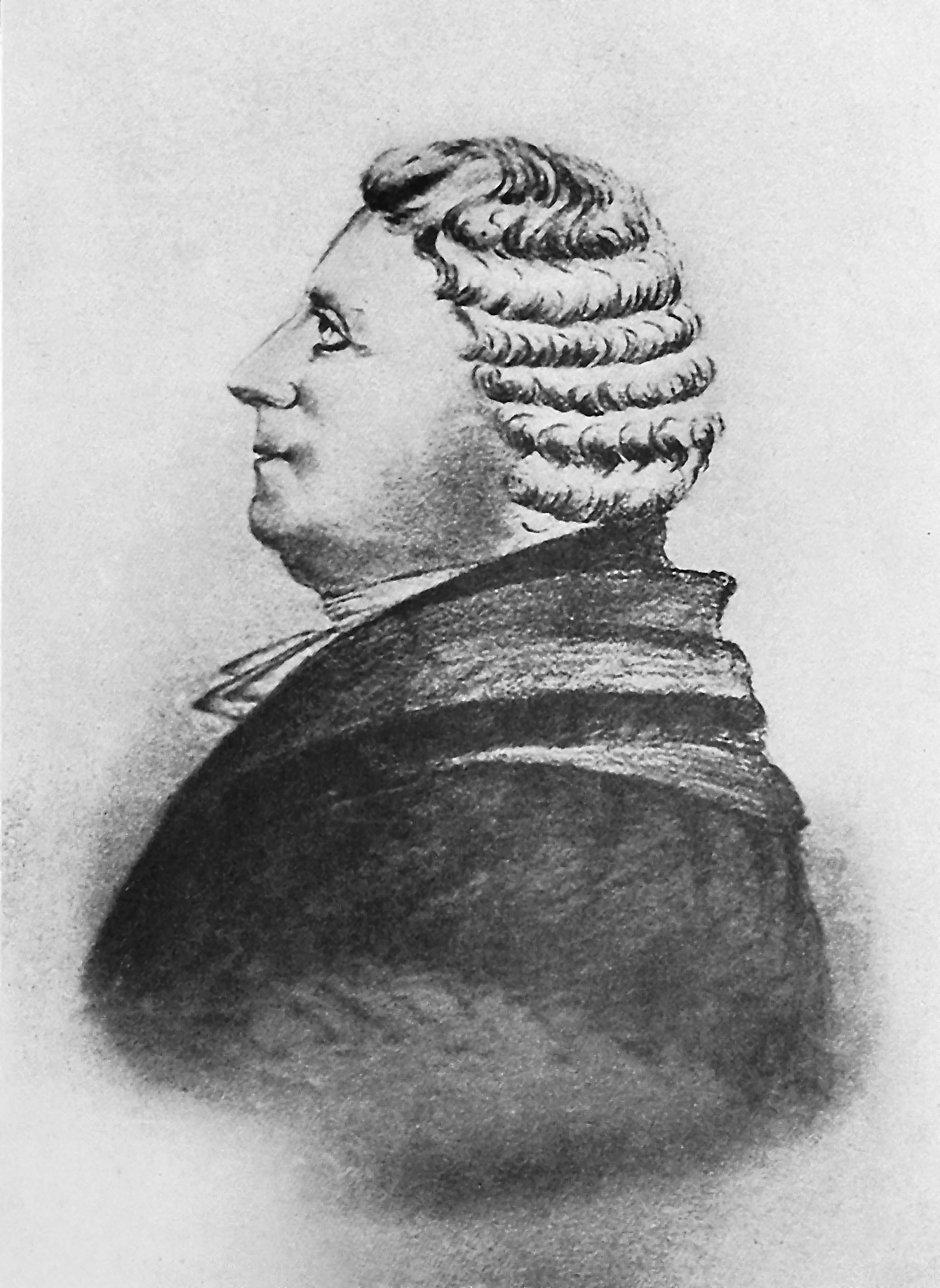
- Born: March 5, 1739; South Hadley, Massachusetts
- Died: March 8, 1819 (aged 80)
- Relatives: Theodore Strong (nephew)
- Military career
- Allegiance: United States of America
- Branch: Continental Army, Massachusetts militia
- Service years: 1775–1783
- Rank: Colonel
- Commands: Woodbridge's (25th) Regiment
- Conflicts: Revolutionary War: • Battle of Bunker Hill • Siege of Boston
- Other work: Farmer, doctor, lawyer, legislator

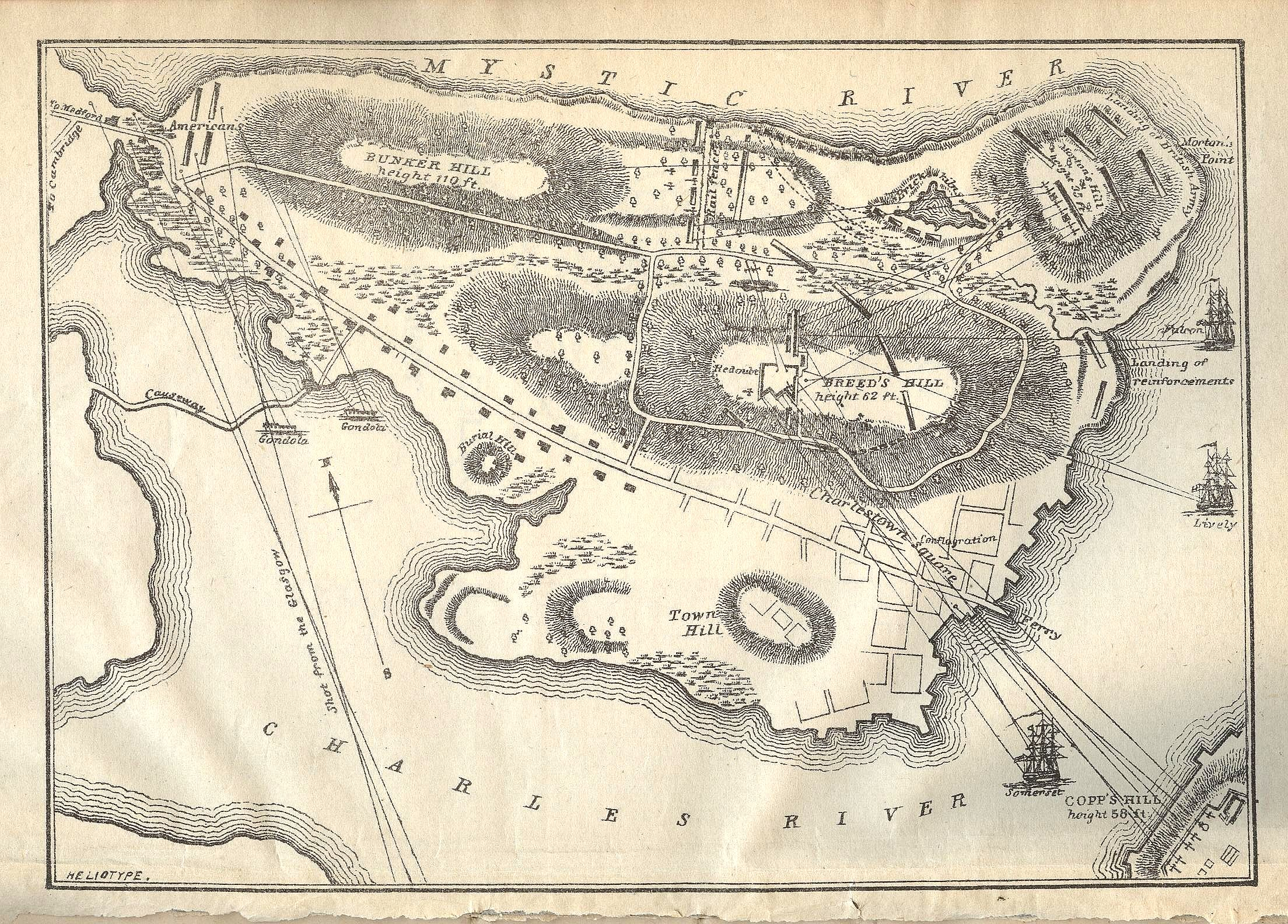
Map of the Battle of Bunker Hill

Map showing Lake Champlain and Lake George

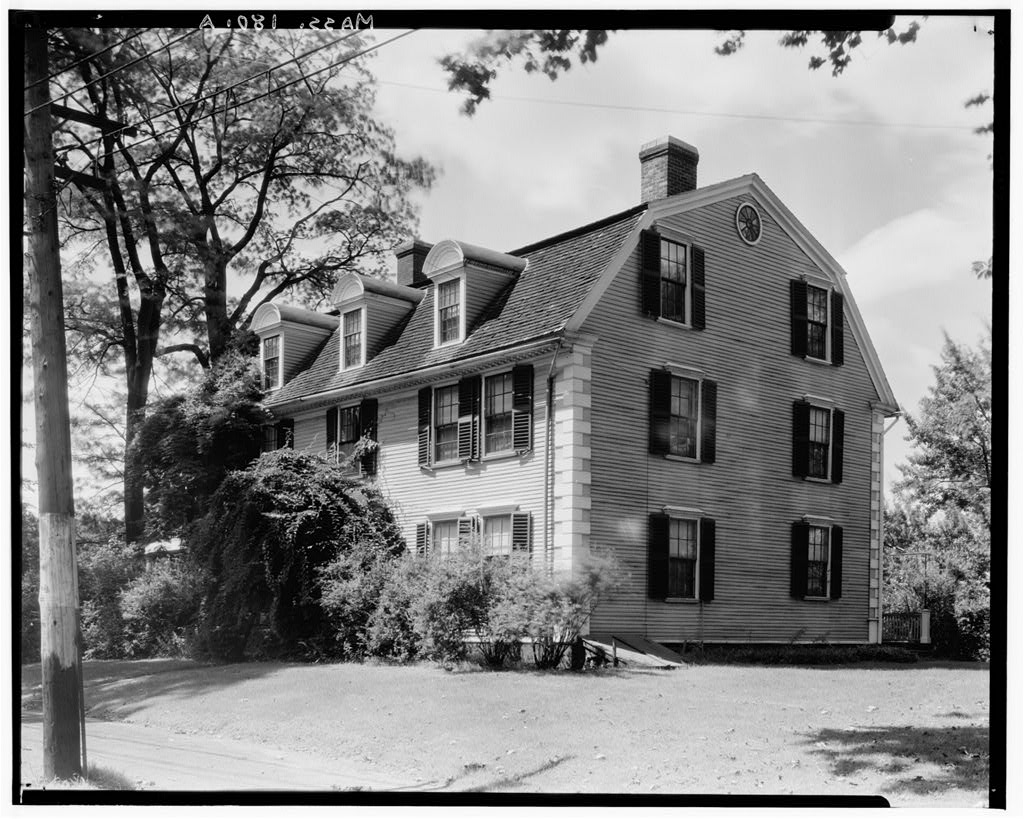
Woodbridge house, 'Sycamores', a former dormitory for Mount Holyoke College

Benjamin Ruggles Woodbridge (March 5, 1739 – March 8, 1819) was an American medical doctor, lawyer, farmer, and military officer who served as a colonel in the Massachusetts militia during the American Revolutionary War. Woodbridge was a commander at the Battle of Bunker Hill, and also owned a rum still, a wood lot, a grazing meadow, and a mill, and came to be the wealthiest man in South Hadley, Massachusetts. Colonel Woodbridge was also a member of the Massachusetts legislature for many years.

== Revolutionary War ==
=== Battle of Bunker Hill ===
Col. Woodbridge entered service on April 20, 1775, the day immediately following the Battles of Lexington and Concord. He commanded a regiment of Minutemen, which was organized into Woodbridge's (25th) Regiment. During the Siege of Boston, Woodbridge's regiment was based at Cambridge near Boston, and participated in the Battle of Bunker Hill, the first large-scale battle of the war. During the Siege of Boston and the Battle of Bunker Hill, Abijah Brown served as lieutenant colonel to Woodbridge, and William Stacy served as major.

On June 17, 1775, immediately prior to the Battle of Bunker Hill, Woodbridge marched his regiment in good order from the mainland across the Charlestown Neck, an isthmus connecting the mainland with the Charlestown Peninsula and the battlefield. The regiment was under fire from British naval vessels as they crossed the neck to reinforce Col. William Prescott's regiment; British vessels were bombarding the battlefield and the Charlestown Neck prior to the assault of the British troops. General Israel Putnam, riding his horse from the battlefield to the neck, met Woodbridge's regiment and urged them to run to the battlefield. The rush to battle caused confusion and separation of Woodbridge's men as they arrived at the field of action. Parts of the regiment engaged and joined the battle.

Woodbridge's regiment arrived at Bunker Hill immediately prior to the battle. A company from Woodbridge's regiment deployed on the right flank, and a portion of the regiment joined Colonel Prescott's regiment at the redoubt and breastwork on the hill. Woodbridge's regiment "was not commissioned, and there are few details of it, or of its officers, in the accounts of the battle." Reports of the battle indicate that the American defenders on the right flank fought valiantly from behind what cover they could find. The men at the redoubt and breastwork fought until they had no more bullets, finally fighting with the butts of their guns, rocks, and their bare hands. It is also reported that Woodbridge's regiment covered the retreat of the Continental Army across the Charleston Neck to the mainland after the hill was taken by the British.

=== Lechmere's Point ===
Woodbridge's regiment was actively involved throughout the Siege of Boston. On November 11, 1775, George Washington wrote to Congress of an incident during the siege, in which Col. Woodbridge and part of his regiment joined with Col. William Thompson's Pennsylvania regiment, defending against a British landing at Lechmere's Point, and "gallantly waded through the water, and soon obliged the enemy to embark under cover of a man-of-war…"

=== Pawlet Expedition ===
Colonel Woodbridge served under General Benjamin Lincoln during the Pawlet Expedition of September 1777. A revolutionary force gathered at Pawlet, Vermont for a three-pronged attack of 500 men each against Fort Ticonderoga. Col. John Brown led a force against the outposts of Ticonderoga, Col. Samuel Johnson led a diversionary force against Mount Independence across Lake Champlain from Ticonderoga, and Col. Woodbridge led a covering force to Skenesborough (now known as Whitehall) at the south end of Lake Champlain. Col. Brown's attack successfully crippled the British position at Ticonderoga, preventing supplies or reinforcements from reaching General John Burgoyne, who surrendered the following month at Saratoga.

== Later life ==
Benjamin Ruggles Woodbridge presented a bell to his parish in South Hadley, Massachusetts. Tradition says that Colonel Woodbridge went to the foundry and cast fifty silver dollars into the molten metal to give the bell a silvery tone. The memory of Colonel Woodbridge was honored with the following quotes:

The duties of his command he performed in a manner highly creditable to himself and to the advantage of the cause which he had espoused. At the call of his country during the Revolutionary War, he often and promptly exerted his military talents and ardor in vindicating the rights, the independence, and laws of his country.

The name of Ruggles Woodbridge, already mentioned, is among the proudest associations of the town [South Hadley]. He was a man of great wealth, was a Colonel in the Revolution, and for many years exercised a commanding influence in the town.

== Personal life ==
Woodbridge did not marry and raised his nephew Theodore Strong, whom he adopted, as his own son. Benjamin Ruggles Woodbridge died in 1819 at the age of 80. He is sometimes referred to as Ruggles Woodbridge or Benjamin Woodbridge.

The Woodbridge home, known as 'Sycamores', served as a dormitory for Mount Holyoke College (South Hadley, Massachusetts) from 1915 to 1970. The mansion, built in 1788 by Colonel Woodbridge, is on the National Register of Historic Places.
