= Theodore Strong (politician) =

Politician

Member of the New Jersey Senate from Middlesex County
- In office January 1, 1900 – December 31, 1903
- Preceded by: James H. Van Cleef
- Succeeded by: William H. C. Jackson

Personal details
- Born: January 15, 1863 New Brunswick, New Jersey, U.S.
- Died: December 24, 1928 (aged 65) New Brunswick, New Jersey, U.S.
- Party: Republican
- Spouse: Cornelia Livingston Van Rensselaer (m. 1900)
- Relations: Theodore Strong (grandfather)
- Children: 8
- Parent(s): Woodbridge Strong; Harriet Hartwell Strong
- Education: Rutgers University

Theodore Strong (January 15, 1863 – December 24, 1928) was an American lawyer and politician.

== Early life ==
Strong was born on January 15, 1863, in New Brunswick, New Jersey. He was the third son of Harriet Anna (née Hartwell) Strong (1827–1909) and Benjamin Ruggles Woodbridge Strong (1827–1907), presiding justice of the Court of Common Pleas of Middlesex County. Among his older siblings was brothers Edward Woodbridge Strong; Alan Hartwell Strong, who married Susan De Lancey Cullen Van Rensselaer; and Joseph Maltby Strong. Reportedly, his father caught "gold fever" in 1849, and journeyed to California, and is "credited with being among the pioneers who made gold discoveries in Oregon."

His paternal grandfather was the prominent mathematician, Theodore Strong, who was raised by his wealthy uncle Benjamin Ruggles Woodbridge (the namesake of his father). Through his father, he was a direct descendant of Governor Thomas Dudley, and Rev. John Woodbridge, who came to Massachusetts in 1634. Through his mother, he was a descendant of William Hartwell, who came to Plymouth County, Massachusetts in 1636.

Strong received his education at Rutgers College Grammar School and graduated from Rutgers University as a member of the class of 1883.

== Career ==
After studying law under his father at Woodbridge, Strong & Sons (founded in 1852), he was admitted to the bar in June 1886, and as a counselor in June 1889. When his father became a judge, the firm was dissolved and he formed a new firm with his brother Alan, known as Strong & Strong, and practiced until his death in 1928. In September 1912, after his brother Alan moved to Philadelphia and became General Counsel for the Pennsylvania Railroad Company, Theodore became solicitor for the company in New Jersey and "wholly withdrew from politics."

In November 1900, Strong was elected in a Republican wave to the New Jersey State Senate to represent Middlesex County, New Jersey defeating the incumbent Democratic candidate, and former mayor of New Brunswick, James H. Van Cleef, with 9,283 to 7,327. Strong had secured the Republican nomination in October after thirty-seven ballots. He was succeeded in the Senate by fellow Republican William Howard Crosby Jackson. In addition, Strong served two terms as a member of the Republican State Committee, served on the executive committee and "was a member of the coterie of Republican State Leaders once known as 'The Big Four'". In April 1903, he was appointed by Governor Franklin Murphy as a member of the New Jersey State Board of Assessors and later served as its president for several years.

== Personal life ==
On March 21, 1900, Strong was married to Cornelia Livingston Van Rensselaer (1879–1956). Cornelia, a graduate of the Misses Fenimore Coopers' School in Albany, New York, was the daughter of Visscher Van Rensselaer and Mary Augusta Miller (née Van Rensselaer) and a great-granddaughter of Jeremiah Van Rensselaer a U.S. Representative and the former Lieutenant Governor of New York. Together, Theodore and Cornelia lived at "Stronghold" at 272 Hamilton Street in New Brunswick and were the parents of six sons and two daughters:

- Theodore Strong (1901–1978).
- Cornelia Livingston Van Rensselaer Strong (1902–1989), who served as a president of the New York chapter of the Colonial Dames of America.
- Katharine Van Rensselaer Strong (b. 1904), who married Morrison Ulman.
- Stephen Van Rensselaer Strong (1906–1975), who married Marianne Schappert.
- Benjamin Ruggles Woodbridge Strong (1910–1997), who married Julie Maxilienne DeViry (1919–2000), a native of Thonon-les-Bains, France who was a daughter of Baron Humbert and Baroness Delphine Marie deViry.
- John Van Rensselaer Strong (1912–1990), who married Nancy (née Jones) de Rohan.
- Robert Livingston Strong (1914–2007), who married Mary Johnston Sutherland (1924–2006).
- Philip Livingston Strong (1918–1998), who married Sally Ann Borthwick (1928-2013).

Strong died at his home in New Brunswick on December 24, 1928, after several days suffering "from the grip" (today known as influenza). His funeral was held at his home and was conducted by Dr. William Henry Steele Demarest, then president of the New Brunswick Theological Seminary and former president of Rutgers University.

New Jersey Senate
Preceded by James H. Van Cleef	Member of the New Jersey Senate from Middlesex County; 1900–1903	Succeeded by William H. C. Jackson
