= New Vernon, New York =

Coordinates: 41°30′06″N 74°29′04″W

New Vernon is a hamlet in Orange County, in the U.S. state of New York.

== History ==
A post office called New Vernon was established in 1822, and remained in operation until 1853. The community's name means "New Spring", vernus meaning "spring" in Latin.
