= History of Rockland County, New York (1798–1900) =

Coordinates: 41.15°N 74.03°W

The recorded history of Rockland County, New York begins on February 23, 1798, when the county was split off from Orange County, New York and formed as its own administrative division of the state of New York. It is located 6 miles (9.7 km) north-northwest of New York City, and is part of the New York Metropolitan Area. The county seat is the hamlet of New City. The name comes from rocky land, an early description of the area given by settlers. Rockland is New York's southernmost county west of the Hudson River. It is suburban in nature, with a considerable amount of scenic designated parkland. Rockland County does not border any of the New York City boroughs, but is only 9.5 miles (15.3 km) north of Manhattan at the counties' (New York and Rockland) two respective closest points (Palisades, New York, in Rockland and Inwood Park in Manhattan)

Most of the early settlers were Dutch, with a sprinkling of Huguenot and Quaker families. The settlers lived almost entirely off the land, farming – berries, fruits and vegetables, as well as hunting, fishing, and trapping.

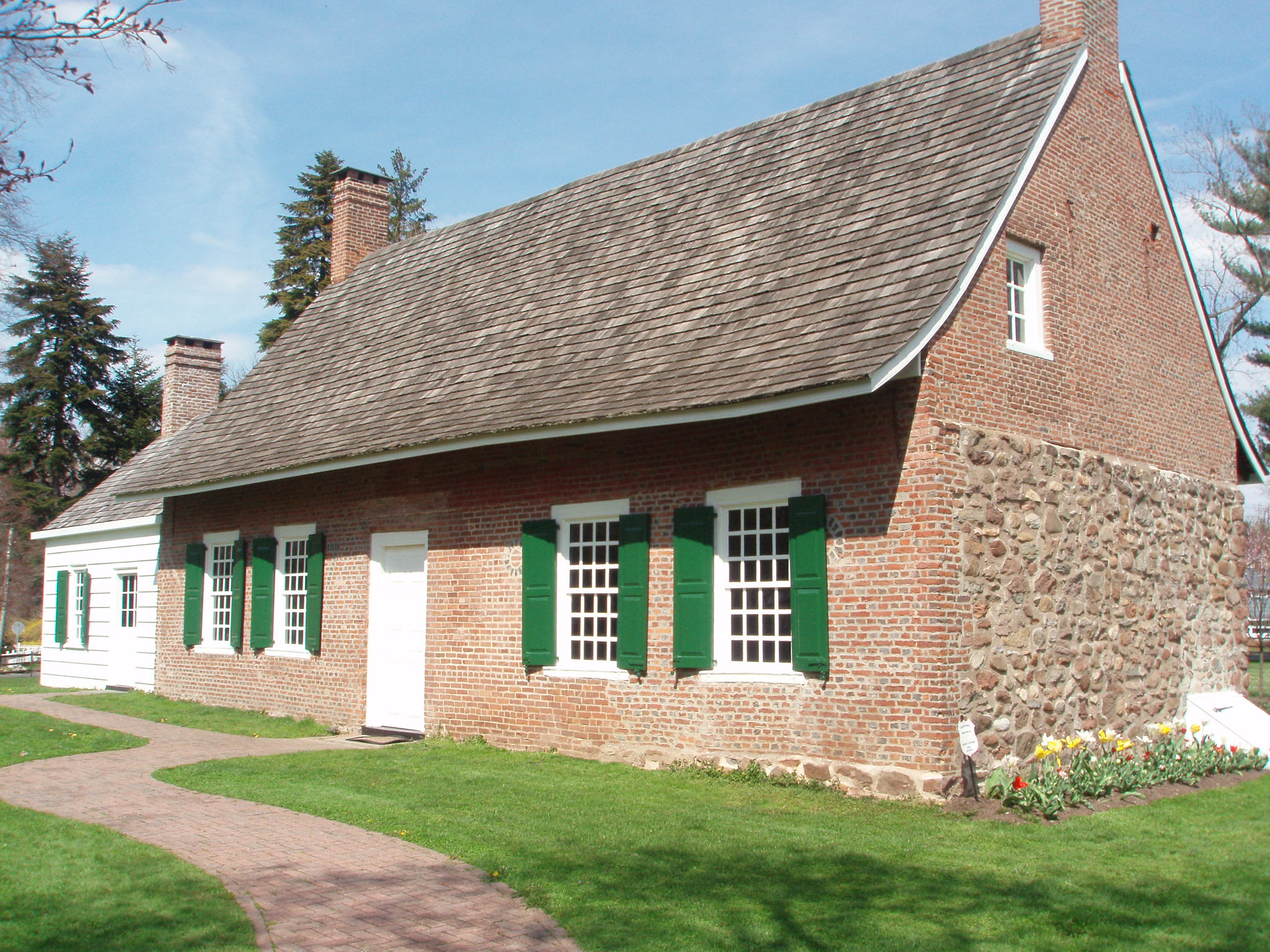
1700 DeWint House

Early attempts to settle the county by the Dutch were generally unsuccessful, and in 1664 they handed over the territory to the English. Yet the Dutch did leave a legacy in place names like Dunderberg Mountain, Sparkill and High Tor, as well as a small collection of unique sandstone houses like the 1700 DeWint House, built in Tappan and still exists, which later served as George Washington’s headquarters.

During the American Revolutionary War, Rockland County was a strategic crossroads, camping ground and vital link between the northern and southern colonies. Troops often used Kings Ferry at Stony Point and Dobbs Ferry at Snedens Landing in Palisades. The first post office in Rockland County was established at New Antrim, now Suffern, on October 4, 1797.

By 1800, the total population of the newly created County of Rockland was nearly 6,400. The land was cleared, homes, schools and churches were built and sawmills and gristmills erected along the numerous creeks.

By 1828, Native Americans had virtually disappeared from the county and slavery existed in a diminished form.

== History ==
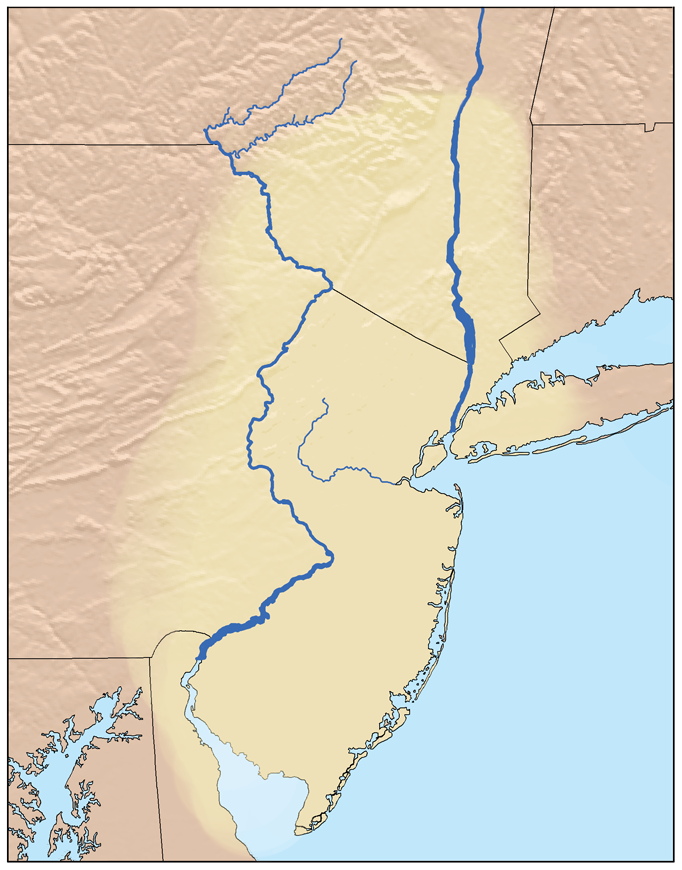
Lenapehoking

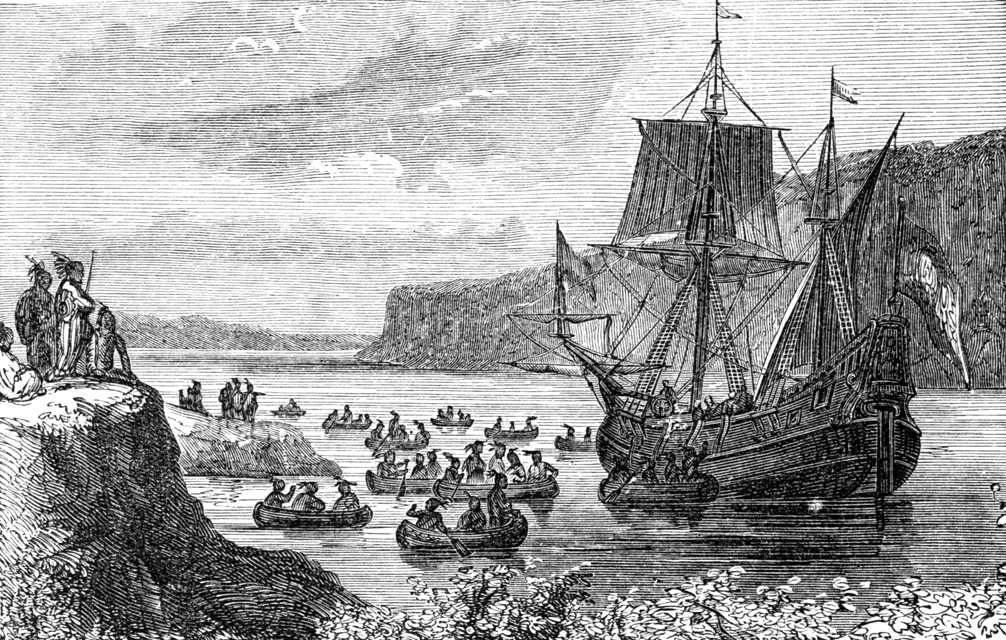
Halve Maen in Hudson

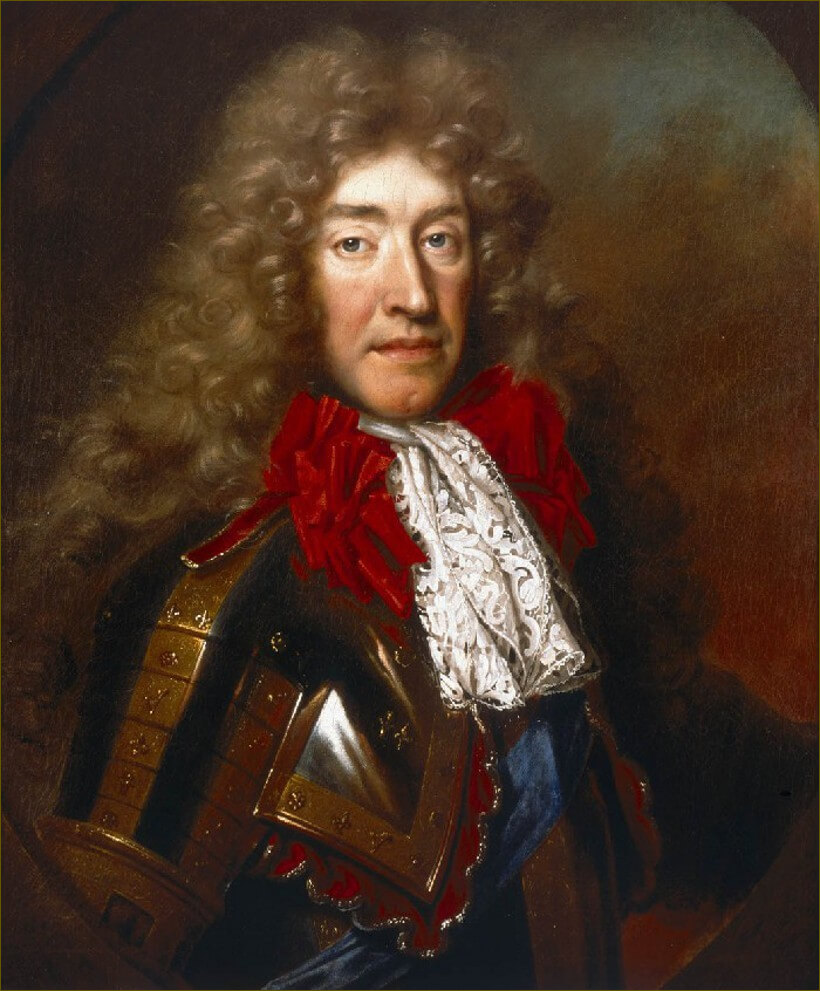
King James II of England

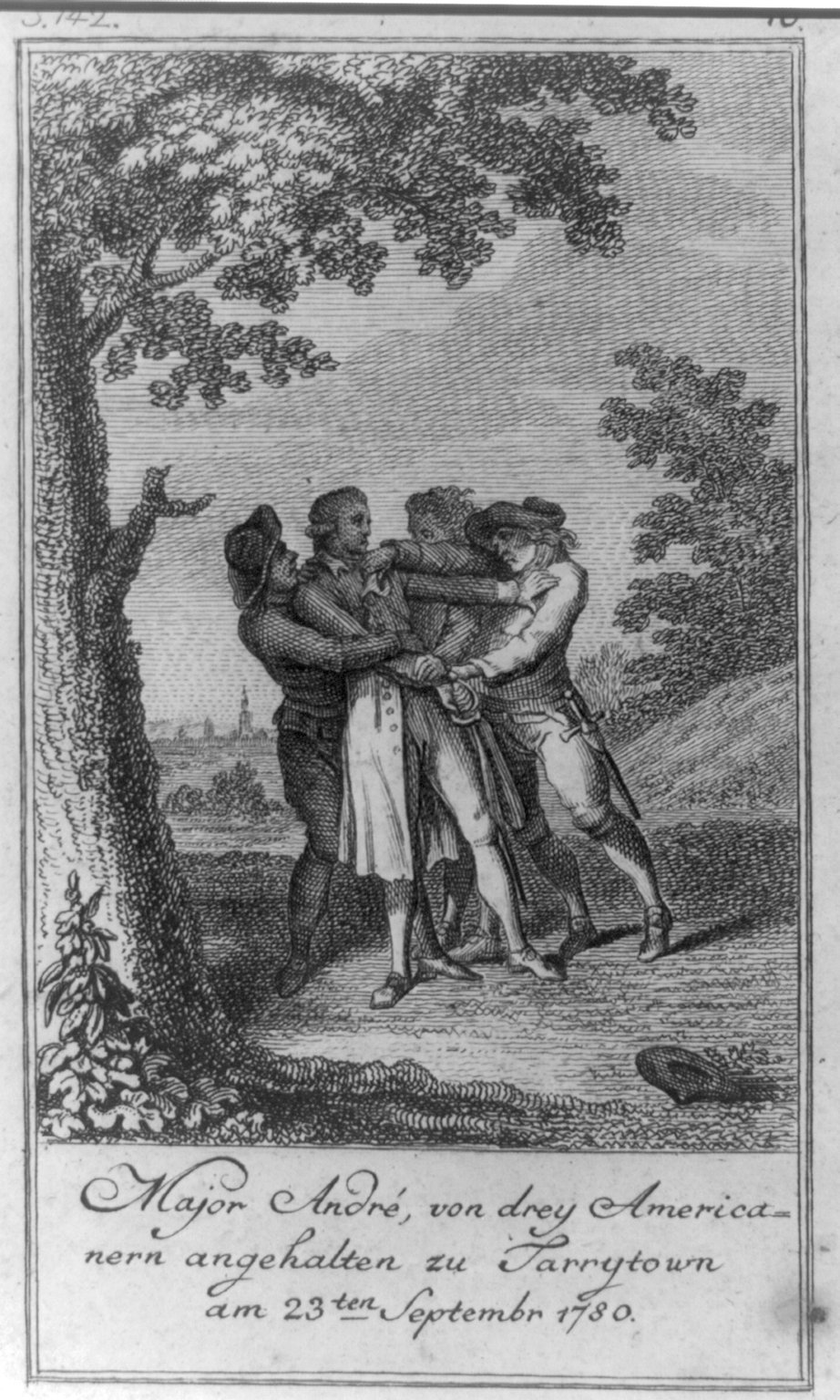
Capture of British Major John André

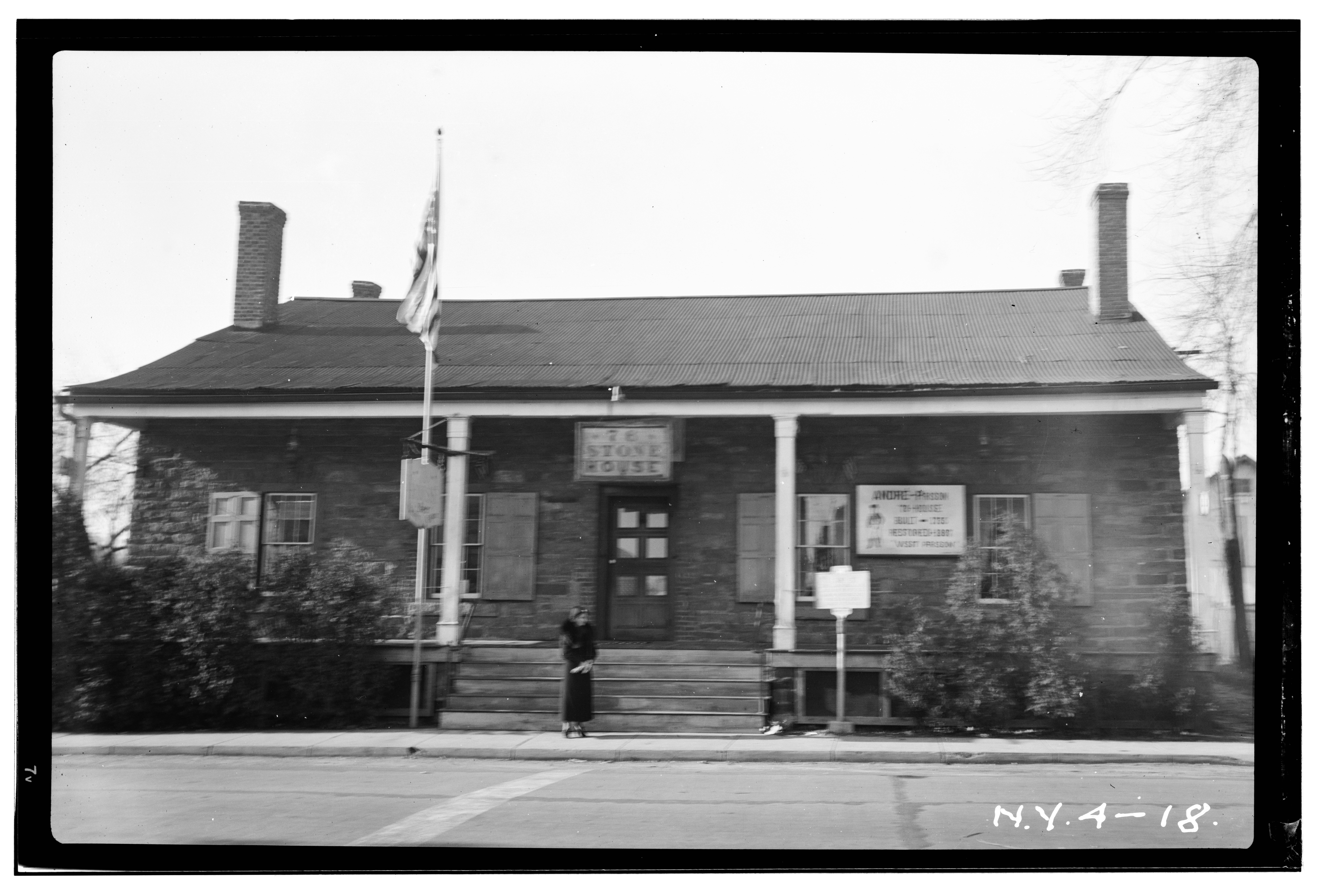
Major Andre House (Prison), Main Street, Tappan, Rockland County, NY

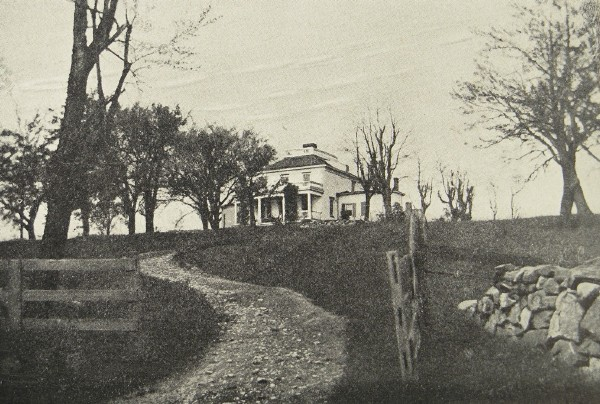
Joshua Hett Smith House, Treason Hill, West Haverstraw, New York

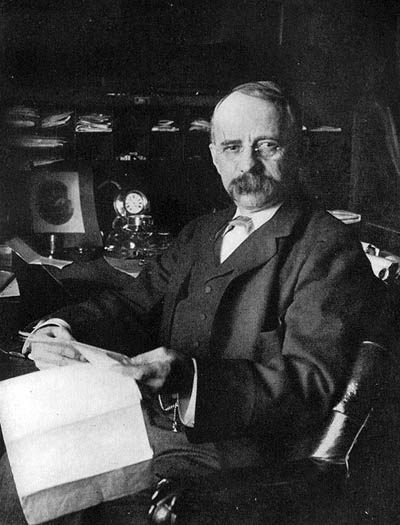
Edward Henry Harriman

The area that became Rockland County was originally inhabited by Algonquian-speaking Native Americans, including Munsees, or Lenni Lenape. The Tappan tribe had a particularly noteworthy presence in the area, extending from present-day Nyack, south to Sparkill and Tappan, down the Hackensack River valley through present-day Bergen County, NJ, and also along the Palisades and Hudson shore all the way down to present-day Edgewater, NJ.

In 1609, Henry Hudson was the first major Dutch explorer to arrive in the area. Hudson, thinking he had found the legendary "Northwest Passage", sailed on the Half Moon up the river that would one day bear his name, passing through the area that is now Haverstraw before exploring north towards what is now Albany.

In the years before 1664 when the area was formally a Dutch colony called New Netherland, present-day Rockland did not have formal European settlements. However, individuals did explore the area and made transactions with Tappan tribe for land with the idea that it could have future use. For example, in 1640, Dutch Captain David Pietersz. de Vries purchased from natives the area where the Sparkill Creek flows into the Hudson River.

In 1664, the British Crown assumed control of New Netherland from the Dutch. In June 1664, the Berkeley-Carteret land grant established the colony of New Jersey, dividing present-day Rockland and Bergen Counties into separate political areas. The northern border of New Jersey was placed in a straight line from the Delaware River at present-day Port Jervis to the Hudson River at 41 degrees even North latitude, where the Palisades Cliffs pause and give way to Sneden's Landing in Orangetown. The state line remains there to this day, though various disagreements along the exact border were had over the years.

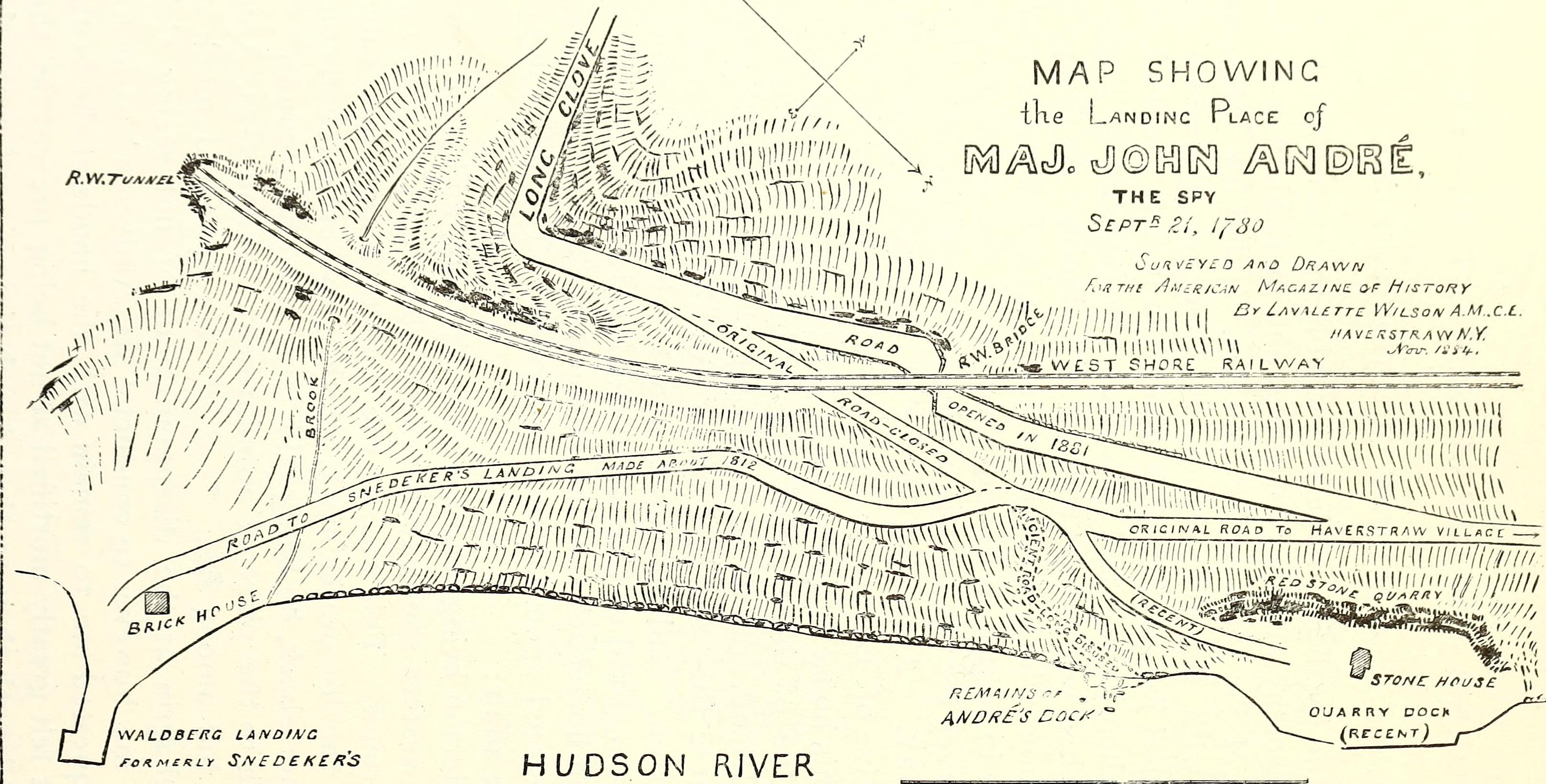

In the 1670s, permanent Dutch settlers began to arrive with land grants, starting with the Tappan area. These settlers were eager to escape "city life", moving from Manhattan to Rockland. A number of unique, Dutch-style red sandstone houses still stand, and many place names in the county reveal their Dutch origin.

In 1683, when the Duke of York (who became King James II of England) established the first twelve counties of New York, present-day Rockland County was part of Orange County, known then as "Orange County South of the Mountains". Orangetown was created at the same time under a royal grant, originally encompassing all of modern Rockland County. Around this time, as the English began to colonize Nyack and Tappan, the Native Americans began to leave Rockland in search of undisturbed land further north.

The natural barrier of the Ramapo Mountains and the size of the county made carrying out governmental activities difficult. At one point, two governments were active, one on each side of the Ramapo Mountains, so Rockland split off from Orange in 1798 to form its own county. That same year, the county seat was transferred from Tappan to New City, where a new courthouse was built.

Haverstraw was separated from Orangetown in 1719, and became a town in 1788; it included the present-day Clarkstown, Ramapo, and Stony Point. Clarkstown and Ramapo became towns in 1791, followed by Stony Point in 1865.

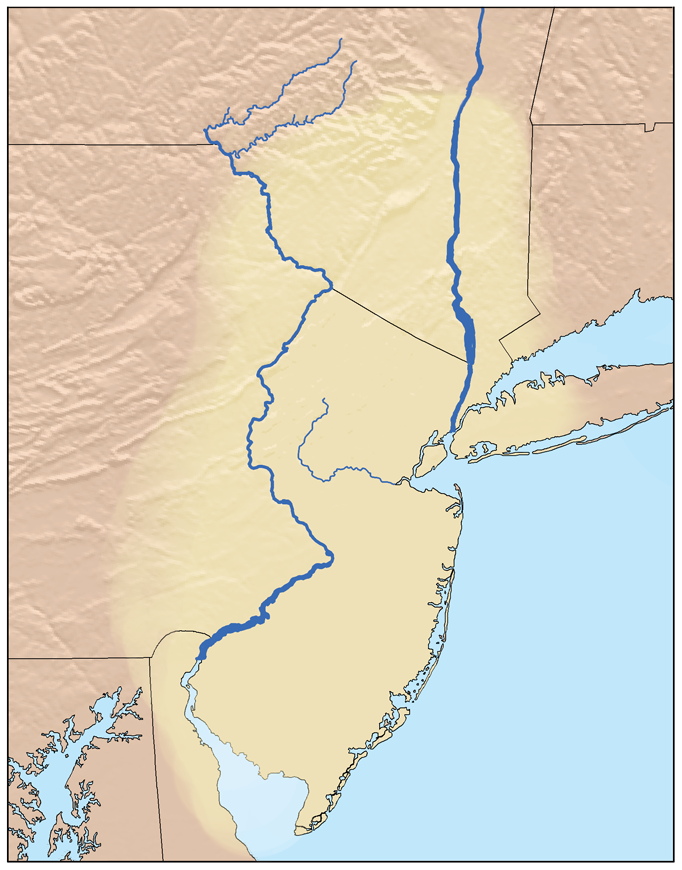
The territory of the Lenape in present-day southern New York, New Jersey, and eastern sections of Delaware and Pennsylvania

During the American Revolution, when control of the Hudson River was viewed by the British as strategic to dominating the American territories, Rockland had skirmishes at Haverstraw, Nyack, and Piermont, and significant military engagements at the Battle of Stony Point, where General "Mad" Anthony Wayne earned his nickname. George Washington had headquarters for a time at John Suffern's tavern, the later site of the village of Suffern. British Major John André met with American traitor Benedict Arnold near Stony Point to buy the plans for the fortifications at West Point. André was captured with the plans in Tarrytown on his way back to the British lines; he was brought to Tappan for trial in the Tappan church, found guilty, hanged, and buried nearby. Still another important chapter in the story of the Revolution was written on May 5, 1783, when General Washington received Sir Guy Carleton at the DeWint House, where they discussed terms of a peace treaty. Two days later, Washington visited Sir Guy aboard a British war vessel. On this day, the king's navy fired its first salute to the flag of the United States of America.

In the decades following the Revolution, Rockland became popular for its stone and bricks. Many buildings in New York City were built with bricks made in Rockland. These products, however, required quarrying in land that many later believed should be set aside as a preserve. Many unsuccessful efforts were made to turn much of the Hudson Highlands on the northern tip of the county into a forest preserve. Union Pacific Railroad president E. H. Harriman, though, donated land and large sums of money for the purchase of properties in the area of Bear Mountain. Bear Mountain/Harriman State Park became a reality in 1910 when Harriman's widow donated his lands to the state, and by 1914, more than an estimated one million people a year were coming to the park. After World War I, Rockland County became the most important sausage-making hub in New York.

Rockland remained semirural until the 1950s, when the Palisades Interstate Parkway, Tappan Zee Bridge, and other major arteries were built. In the decades that followed, the county became a maturely developed suburb of New York City. As people moved up from the five boroughs (particularly the Bronx in the early years) the population flourished from 89,276 in 1950 to 338,329 in 2020, a 279% increase.

=== Historical settlements ===
In the 19th century, the following settlements were created in these towns. Several have been renamed, some expanded and others disappeared. The naming of settlements mostly derived from the person who owned the land and/or the geography of the location. Currently Rockland County is one of 24 areas in New York State designated a Preserve America Community.

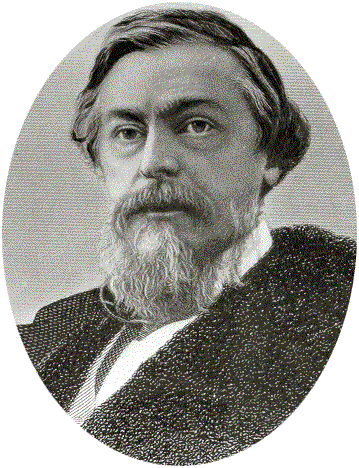
Thomas C. Durant

- Clarkstown
  - Cedar Grove Corner – North of the hamlet of Rockland Lake, East of New City.
  - Clarksville – Renamed Nyack Turnpike, then Mont Moor and presently West Nyack.
  - Durant – small settlement of private residences one mile (1.6 km) south of New City. In the 20th century, a railroad station named after Thomas C. Durant, organizer and builder of the Union Pacific Railroad, was the third stop of the New Jersey and New York Railroad. Durant's daughter, Heloise Durant Rose was the founder of the Rockland County Welfare Society and of the Dante League of America "for popular propaganda for the study of Dante" and was a signatory of the "Memorial to the Columbia College Board of Trustees", an 1883 petition to allow female students to attend lectures and examinations at Columbia College. (Other prominent signers included Susan B. Anthony - one of the main organizers of the American Equal Rights Association, Caroline Sterling Choate, Chauncey M. Depew, Parke Godwin, Emma Lazarus, Josephine Shaw Lowell, Theodore Roosevelt, Georgina Schuyler, and Charles Comfort Tiffany.)
  - Dutch – North of Nanuet, South of Spring Valley
  - Kakiat (Hackyackawet) - East of Mechanicsville/Viola, West of New City. Kakiat means neck of land between two hills.
  - Quaspeck – Located at the foot of Hook Mountain at the southern end of Rockland Lake. The original patent, which included 5,000 acres (20 km^{2}) is dated 1694. The creation of Rockland Lake State Park ended the community.
  - Rockland Lake – formerly known as Slaughterer's Landing. A thriving community in Rockland Lake State Park made up of the many workers at the Knickerbocker Ice Company, which owned numerous pieces of property. The hamlet included a number of hotels, Knickerbocker Fire House – established 1862, school, stores and the stone-crushing mill.
  - Sickletown – A hamlet named after the Sickles family located along the east and west side of Sickletown Road, also named after them. A few of the sandstone homes, mostly Pre-Revolutionary, built by the members of the Sickles family remain.
- Haverstraw
  - Archerville – Later changed to Samsondale. North of Haverstraw Village, South of Bensons Corners. Samsondale Iron Works was established in 1832.
  - Bensons Corners – North of Garnerville.
  - Diamond Valley – A farming community southeast of Johnsontown.
  - Johnsontown (Town of West Haverstraw) – Founded in the late 18th century by the Johnson brothers who came to the mountain area looking for timber to use for shipbuilding. It stretched along what is now known as Lake Sebago and Lake Kanawauke making it the largest settlement in the western part of the state park.
  - Meads Corner – South of Garnerville.

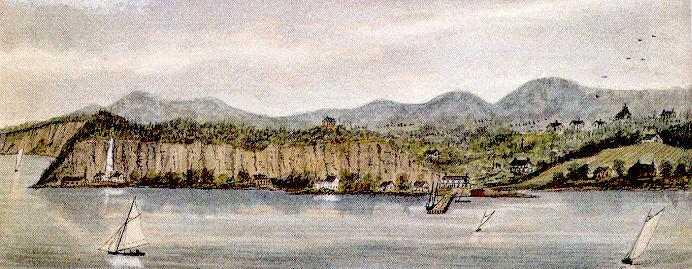
Sneden's Landing

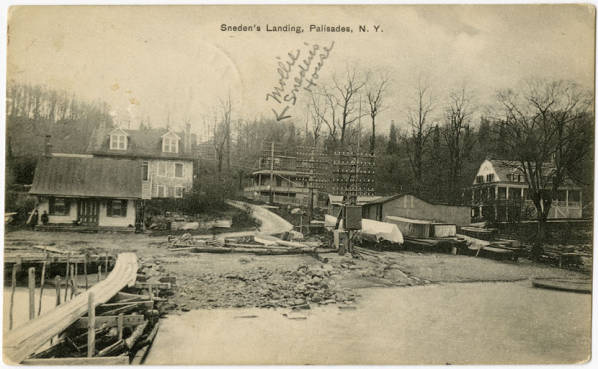
Mollie Sneden's house

- Orangetown
  - Middletown – A hamlet midway between the pioneers settled at Ramapo and Tappan.
  - Muddy Brook – Pearl River proper.
  - Orangeville Mills – Orangeville was a hamlet 2 miles (3.2 km) west from Blauvelt, formerly known as Blauveltville.
  - Pascack – A hamlet, often called "South Spring Valley" settled in the first half of the 18th century.
  - Sneden's Landing – Now known as Palisades. Painting shown is by Robert Knox Sneden an American landscape painter - Mollie Sneden operated her ferry service from here during the American Revolutionary War.
  - Upper Grandview
- Ramapo
  - Alexis Station – Hamlet.
  - Bulsontown – Hamlet.
  - Cassady's Corners – South of Mechanicsville/Viola.
  - Forshays Corners – North of Viola.
  - Furmanville – North of Sherwoodville, South of Ladentown.
  - Mechanicsville – present-day Viola.
  - Monsey - Hamlet.
  - Ladentown – 18th-century settlement within the Village of Pomona.
  - Pine Meadow – present site of Pine Meadows Lake. Mostly heavy forest, boulders, swamps and streams. Community, southeast of Johnsontown, populated mainly by farmers, wood-cutters and basket-weavers. James H. Conklin built a cabin which was posted as a historic site before it was vandalized and ultimately destroyed. Only the root cellar remains.
  - Sandyfield – was submerged when swampy Beaver Pond was dammed to create Lake Welch by the Palisades Interstate Park Commission.
  - Sherwoodville – North of Mechanicsville/Viola in the Village of Montebello.
  - Saint John's-in-the-Wilderness – Located about a mile from Sandyfield. It once was a thriving mission established in 1880. It is the only private land within the Harriman State Park.
  - Sterlington – One mile east of Sloatsburg. The name was adopted when the post office opened in 1882. The Sterling Mountain Railway transported ore to the furnaces at Sterling which was known as Sterling Junction or Pierson's Depot. Sterlington ceased when the railway ceased operation.
  - Woodburn – Hamlet.
  - Woodtown – Founded in the early 18th century. Between Pine Meadow and Ladentown, southeast of Johnsontown.

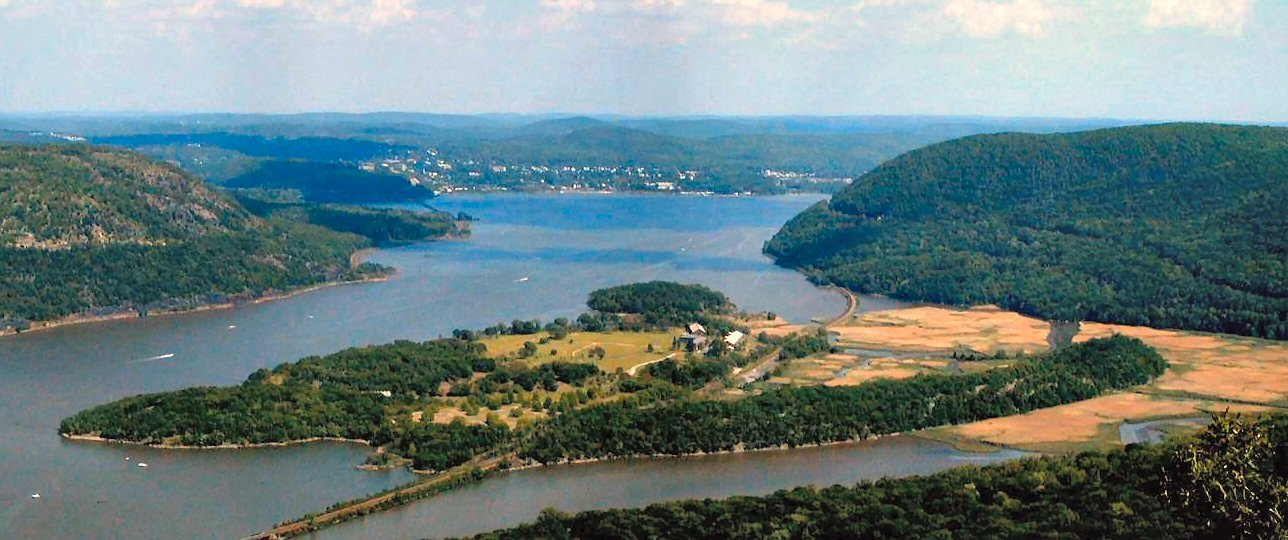
Iona Island

- Stony Point
  - Caldwells Landing – formerly known as Gibraltar. North of Tomkins Cove, South of Iona Island.
  - Doodletown – in Harriman State Park is now a ghost town.
  - Grassey Point – Renamed North Haverstraw on August 21, 1834. Renamed back to Grassy Point on September 10, 1836. The 1939 3-cent United States postage stamp commemorates the hundredth anniversary of baseball depicting the old baseball diamond at Grassy Point. The background of the stamp shows St. Joseph's Church and the Grassy Point school which was one of the last one-room schools in Rockland closing in 1963.
  - Iona Island (I own an island) – formerly known as Waggons (Weyant's) Island. It is said that it has always been a "picnic and pleasure ground visited annually by thousands from New York and other neighboring cities". Access is now restricted by the Palisades Interstate Park Commission.
  - Jones Point – a hamlet located in the town of Stony Point.
  - Mountville – An alternate name for the southern end of Doodletown. West of Stony Point.
  - Willow Grove – Contains part of the former New York State Letchworth Village facility.
- Dunderberg Mountain – A landmark for British forces during the American Revolutionary War, The formation of the Dunderberg Spiral Railway Corporation in 1889 and Thomas Edison, in 1890, began to establish an iron mine by acquiring nearly 200 acres (0.81 km^{2}) on the north slope of Dunderberg.
- Buckberg Mountain – The site of Washington's Lookout, an observation point used by General George Washington and Colonel "Mad" Anthony Wayne to plan a surprise attack on British troops in the Battle of Stony Point. The post overlooked Haverstraw Bay and afforded views of the Hudson River to the north and south.

=== Historical places of Rockland County ===
See National Register of Historic Places listings in Rockland County, New York.

==== Historical places and events ====
- St. Philip's AME Zion Church - The church was founded in 1859 by abolitionist John W Towt. A Methodist by faith, Towt was first exposed to the "cruel perversion of slavery" at age 19 while traveling through the American South in 1821. Towt was a contemporary of Harriet Tubman and Frederick Douglass, whose family was known to be involved in the clandestine Underground Railroad (UGRR) network. The church itself served as a community hub for Nyack's free Black population.
- Cereo, first baby food, was manufactured by Macy Deming at the Haring Adams (Deming) House in Tappan.
- The Christ Episcopal Church of Piermont – 416 Valentine Avenue in Sparkill – is Rockland's first established Episcopal Church. This stone church was built in 1865. The first service was held in 1847 in a converted warehouse.
- The Congregation of the Sons of Jacob, 37 Clove Avenue in the Village of Haverstraw begun in 1877 is the oldest Jewish congregation in Rockland County.
- Doodletown settlement is now a ghost town.
- Dr. Davies Farm, in Congers was owned by a relative of Meriwether Lewis (of the Lewis and Clark Expedition).
- Haverstraw King's Daughters Village Library – The oldest public library in Rockland County.
- Josephine Hudson House in the hamlet of Rockland Lake belonged to the first woman to work in the Knickerbocker Ice Company. Money is currently being raised to preserve the house.
- Julius Braunsdorf, industrial developer & founder of Pearl River was the inventor of carbon arc light bulbs and electric generators and installed the first indoor lighting in the world in U.S. Capitol in Washington, D.C.
- Knickerbocker Ice Company – established 1831 in Valley Cottage at Rockland Lake had the cleanest and purest ice in the area and became known as the "Icehouse of New York City".
- Lafayette Theatre – 97 Lafayette Ave in Suffern is Rockland's only surviving movie palace.
- Mount Moor African-American Cemetery - Located in West Nyack (near the Palisades Center Mall area), this historic segregated cemetery, deeded in 1849, is the final resting place for several Civil War veterans, including members of the U.S. Colored Troops, and is an important site for understanding the local Black community during that era.
- New Hempstead Presbyterian Church, known as The English Meeting House was the first English-speaking church west of the Hudson River in New York State.
- New Hope Christian Church, established in 1824 and the only continuing congregation that was once part of Classis Hackensack of the True Reformed Dutch Church.
- Nyack Brook This waterway served as a crucial natural landmark that guided freedom seekers to safe houses, including properties owned by the Hesdras, as it flowed toward the Hudson River.
- The Orangetown Resolutions were adopted in Tappan when Great Britain increased its taxes on tea and crops, prompting protest from local patriots on Monday, July 4, 1774, two years to the date before adopting the Declaration of Independence.
- The first railroad line across Rockland County was built in 1841 and ran from Piermont to Ramapo.
- St. John's in the Wilderness is the only private land within the Harriman State Park.
- St. Paul's Episcopal Church – 26 South Madison Ave in Spring Valley was added to the National Register of Historic Places in 2008.
- St. Peter's Catholic Church, 115 Broadway in the Village of Haverstraw is the first Catholic Church in Rockland County. The first Mass was celebrated on November 14, 1847.
- Tallman was named after Tunis Tallman, a direct descendant of Rockland's oldest family.
- Thurgood Marshall won a disparity case regarding integration of the schools of Hillburn, 11 years before his landmark case of Brown v. Board of Education, on behalf of the African-American parents.
- Tolstoy Foundation of Valley Cottage, New York, founded in 1939 by Alexandra Lvovna Tolstoy, youngest daughter of Leo Tolstoy.

== American Revolutionary War and War of 1812 ==
Two important battles took place in Rockland County during the American Revolutionary War – the capture by the British of Fort Clinton at Bear Mountain in October 1777 and the victorious attack by General "Mad Anthony" Wayne's army on the British fort at Stony Point in July 1779. Rockland was also the site of the first formal recognition of the new nation by the British. On May 5, 1783, General George Washington received the British Commander, Sir Guy Carleton, at the 1700 DeWint House to discuss the terms of the peace treaty. On May 7, 1783, Sir Guy Carleton received General George Washington aboard his vessel Perseverance. On this day, the King's Navy fired its first salute to the flag of the United States of America. During the War of 1812 against the British Empire, Rockland turned out more soldiers in proportion than any other county in the state. Four Union generals and four Medal of Honor recipients lived in Rockland.

- Abraham P. Stephens - Corporal in Captain Theunis Cooper's Company of Colonel Benjamin J. Gurnee's Regiment

=== 95th New York Volunteer Infantry ===
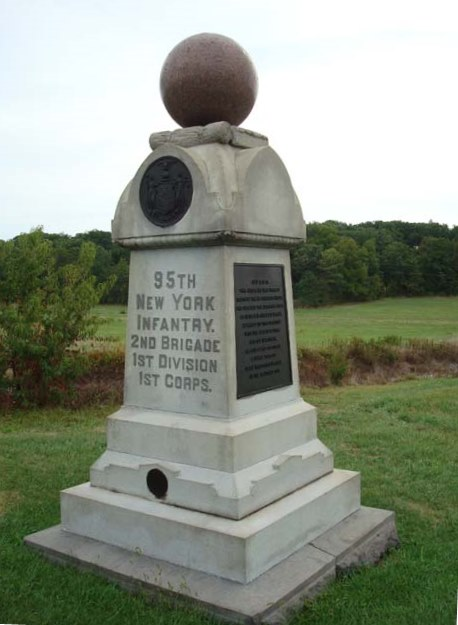
95th New York Infantry Monument

- The 95th New York Volunteer Infantry, nicknamed "Warren Rifles", fought in the American Civil War under the commandment of Ulysses S. Grant, Major General James Samuel Wadsworth and General Brigadier General Edmund Rice (general). The companies were recruited principally: A, B, C, D, G and H in New York city; E in Brooklyn and New York city; F at Haverstraw; I at Sing Sing; and K at Carmel, Peekskill, Sing Sing and White Plains. The infantry joined in the action of the Railroad cut on the first day of the Battle of Gettysburg. They fought many battles including Battle of Mine Run, Grant's Overland Campaign, Battle of the Wilderness, Battle of Spotsylvania Court House, Battle of North Anna, Battle of Cold Harbor and the Siege of Petersburg. They saw the war to the end including engagements in the Battle of the Weldon Railroad, Battle of Hatcher's Run, and the Appomattox Campaign.
  - Ira M. Hedges - private

== Rockland County's historical and notable people from the past ==
=== Historical figures who came to Rockland County ===
Aaron Burr – 3rd Vice President of the United States.
Alexander Hamilton – 1st United States Secretary of the Treasury.
Benjamin Harrison – 23rd President of the United States.
Millard Fillmore – 13th President of the United States.
Franklin Delano Roosevelt – then governor of the State of New York and afterwards the 32nd President of the United States.
George Clinton – First (and longest-serving) elected Governor of New York, and then 4th Vice President of the United States.
George Washington – 1st President of the United States (1776–1783) Approximately 20 times.
Grover Cleveland – 22nd and 24th President of the United States.
Harry S. Truman – 33rd President of the United States.
Martha Washington – The 1st First Lady of the United States.
Martin Van Buren – 8th President of the United States.
Theodore Roosevelt – 26th President of the United States.

Former President Herbert Hoover became the first honorary chairman of Tolstoy Foundation in Valley Cottage, New York, in 1939 and served in this capacity until his death in 1964.

=== Other historical figures who came to Rockland County ===
- Comte de Rochambeau – A French aristocrat, soldier, and a Marshal of France who participated in the American Revolutionary War.
- General "Mad" Anthony Wayne earned his nickname leading 1,350 Continental Army troops in a surprise attack against the 544 man British garrison at Stony Point.
- Frederick Douglass On August 3, 1965, delivered a lecture on Abraham and Emancipation. Douglass advocated for black suffrage and equality, emphasizing the role of slavery in causing the Civil War. Frederick Douglass address the people of Nyack on September 23, 1872 at Smithsonian Hall, which opened on April 2, 1872
- Henry Lee III – An early American patriot who served as the 9th Governor of Virginia and a member of the U.S. House of Representatives from Virginia's 19th district. He was also the father of Confederate general Robert E. Lee.
- Marquis de Lafayette – Revolutionary War hero and a leader of the Garde Nationale during the French Revolution visited in 1824.
- Washington Irving (April 3, 1783 – November 28, 1859) was an American author, essayist, biographer and historian of the early 19th century. He accompanied President Martin Van Buren when Van Buren came to call on Mrs. Gertrude Oblenis of West Nyack.

Thurgood Marshall – Associate Justice of the Supreme Court of the United States

=== Other historical figures who lived in Rockland County ===
- John Charles Frémont (January 21, 1813 – July 13, 1890), was an American military officer, explorer, the first candidate of the Republican Party for the office of President of the United States, and the first presidential candidate of a major party to run on a platform opposing slavery. During the 1840s, that era's penny press accorded Frémont the sobriquet The Pathfinder. It remains in use, and he is sometimes called "The Great Pathfinder". He is buried at Rockland Cemetery at Sparkill.
- Henry Honychurch Gorringe (August 11, 1841 – July 7, 1885) was a United States naval officer who attained national acclaim for successfully completing the removal of Cleopatra's needle from Alexandria, Egypt to Central Park, New York City. He is buried at Rockland Cemetery at Sparkill.

=== The Clarksville Witch 1816 ===
Jane (Naut) Kannif, the widow of a Scotch physician, lived in a small house on Germonds Road in West Nyack. She devoted herself to the care of her only child, a son by a previous marriage, named Tobias Lowrie. She treated, with great results, neighbors that came to her with herbs and methods she learned from her late husband. But "Naut Kannif", as she was called, seemed to have been exceedingly eccentric. According to the people at that time she dressed oddly, had strange hairdos and was unsociable. She was regarded as insane – worse yet – a witch in an era of superstition. It was decided to take "Naut" to Auert Polhemus's grist mill and using his great flour scales weigh her against the old Holland Dutch family Bible, iron bound, with wooden covers and iron chain to carry it by. If outweighed by the Bible, she must be a witch beyond any doubt, and must suffer accordingly. She was taken to the mill against her most earnest protest, put on the scales, and weighed. Weighing more than the Bible, the committee released her. This was the last witch trial in the state of New York.

=== Hangings in Rockland County ===
There are three recorded hangings in Rockland County. They all took place in the 18th century.

- Claudius Smith – (1736 – January 22, 1779) was a notorious Loyalist guerrilla leader during the American Revolution.
- British Major John André – (May 2, 1750 – October 2, 1780) was a British army officer hanged as a spy during the American Revolutionary War.
- Isaac Jones, 24 years old was hanged on Oct 5, 1792 for a bar room brawl killing.

== Early industries ==
The earliest of its industries was the growing of foodstuffs for the great city. Iona Island, known as Weyant's Island became famous with the noted Iona grape as well as hundreds of fruit trees and vines.

Besides agriculture, boat building was one of the early industries until after the American Civil War. Johnsontown in Haverstraw was the seat of the first boat building. Nanuet ran a lumber business. The mountain people in Ladentown made baskets, beer barrel hoops, bowls, chairs, ladles and spoons they made from the wood and reeds found in the mountain to sell or take to New York City to be sold.

Mills, both saw and grist, were among the first industries of the county. As early as 1792, tanneries were in existence. Theill's Corners, named after a Dane who came to the locality previous to the Revolution erected a forge. Water power of the Minisceongo was used for grinding grist in 1793; A 120-foot dam was constructed across the Ramapo River. By 1813, The Ramapo Works, owned by the Pierson brothers were producing a million pounds of nails annually. The addition of a cotton mill in 1814, and later woolen mills, nearly doubled the size of the Works, which in 1822 were incorporated under the name "Ramapo Manufacturing Company." During its heyday, the Pierson nail factory was a powerful economic stimulus to the region because of its links to existing agricultural and commercial trade. Ramapo developed into an agricultural marketplace and a locale for manufacturing innovations. Garnerville was the home of the John Suffern Paper Mill in 1850, and print cotton textile factories. West Haverstraw, once known as Samsondale, was where a large rolling mill was started in 1830;

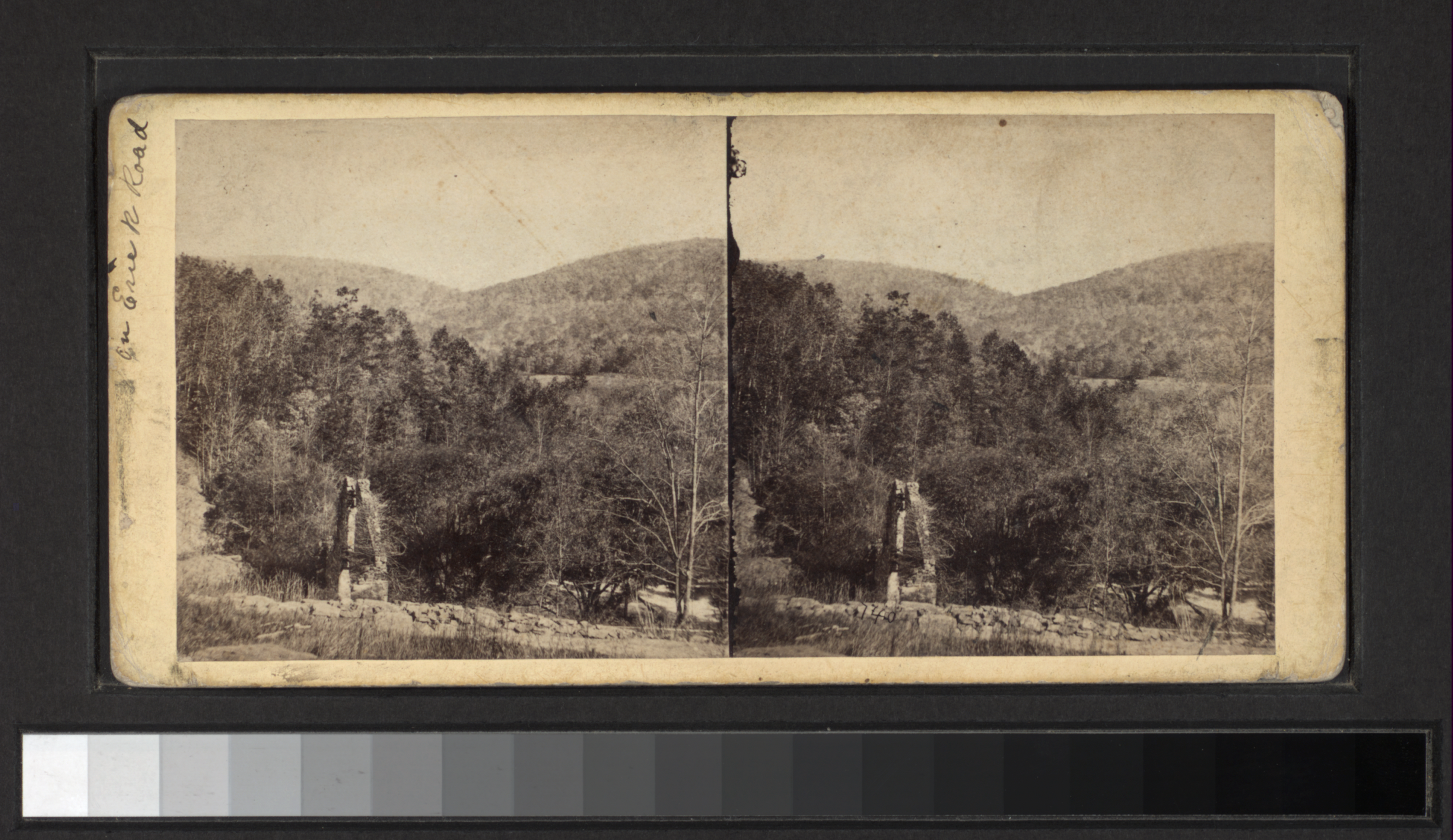
Ruins of the Old Furnace on the Ramapao, where the chain was made, that spanned the Hudson River at West Point during the Revolution

Ramapo built its early reputation in the iron industry. Iron mining was opened up by an English company in 1768 and in 1771 a nickel mine. Because of the proximity of iron mines, numerous metal products were made – plows, hoes, railings, nails, machinery, even cannonballs. The Ramapo Wheel and Foundry Company, organized in 1873, took the prize among all competitors for the productions of their wheels at the Vienna Exposition of 1873. Brigadier Feneral John Frederick Pierson served as president after his service in the American Civil War.

Grey and red sandstones were quarried in great quantities, Building stone from local quarries went into the old Capitol at Albany, Fort Lafayette and the old Trinity Church in New York destroyed in the Great Fire of New York (1776), and the first building at Rutgers College. In 1838 Calvin Tomkins and his brother Daniel purchased approximately 20 acres (81,000 m^{2}) of land, located in a cove north of the Stony Point promontory, limestone was found in usable quantities suitable for burning along the river shore for the purpose of making lime.

Rockland factories made shoes, straw hats, silk and cotton cloth, sulfur matches, smoking pipes and pianos. But the greatest of the industries was the making of brick followed by the ice-harvesting.

The first bricks, made for public market, were baked in 1810 on the banks of the Minisceongo, but not until James Wood, of England, set up a brick kiln at Haverstraw, in 1817, was the first successful plant erected. Wood developed the modern way of mixing coal dust with the clay, in 1828, which revolutionized the manufacture of brick. Commonly referred to as "Bricktown", Haverstraw was famous for its brick-making, which was a major industry for the village. Brick-making was so popular due to the clay formed by the Hudson River's water and the rich soil that lined Haverstraw's waterfront, that it was nicknamed the "Brickmaking Capital of the World". Many of the old brownstone and brick structures that were constructed in New York City in the late 1890s-early 1900s were composed of bricks manufactured by Haverstraw. At one point, in the early 20th century, there were more than forty brick-making factories lining the Hudson River within the village. Although brick-making involved all the ethnic groups, 60 percent of the brickyard workers were African-Americans.

Rockland Lake, a beautiful sheet of water a half mile back from the Hudson, at an elevation of more the 150 feet above that river was and is the most notable natural lake and the source of one of the largest branches of the Hackensack River. The lake, known to have had the cleanest and purest ice in the area, was harvested by The Knickerbocker Ice Company established 1831. The company harvested thousands of tons of ice from the lake annually and once harvested 1 million tons of ice. The wooden storehouse's walls were insulated with sawdust to keep the ice blocks frozen until they were shipped in the summer. By 1834, the company owned a dozen steamboats, 75 ice barges and employed about 3,000 to ship ice countrywide. The stored ice was placed on inclined railroad cars, transported down the mountainside, placed on barges on the Hudson River and shipped to New York City. Slaughter's Landing was used as the shipping point for the Ice harvested at Rockland Lake. So much ice was shipped that Rockland Lake became known as the "Icehouse of New York City".

== Early Sports ==
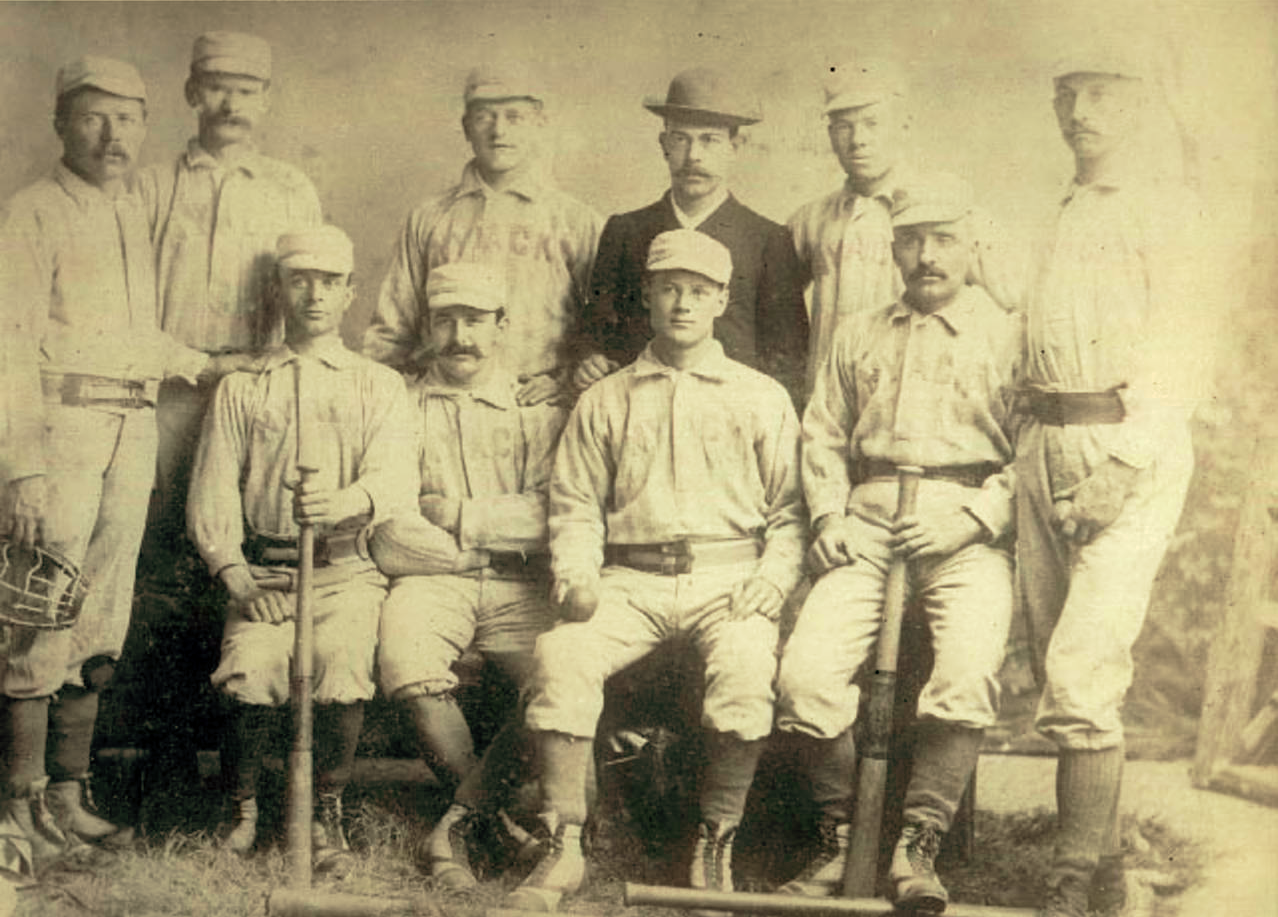
Nyack Baseball team 1890

== Transportation during the earlier years ==
=== Stagecoach ===
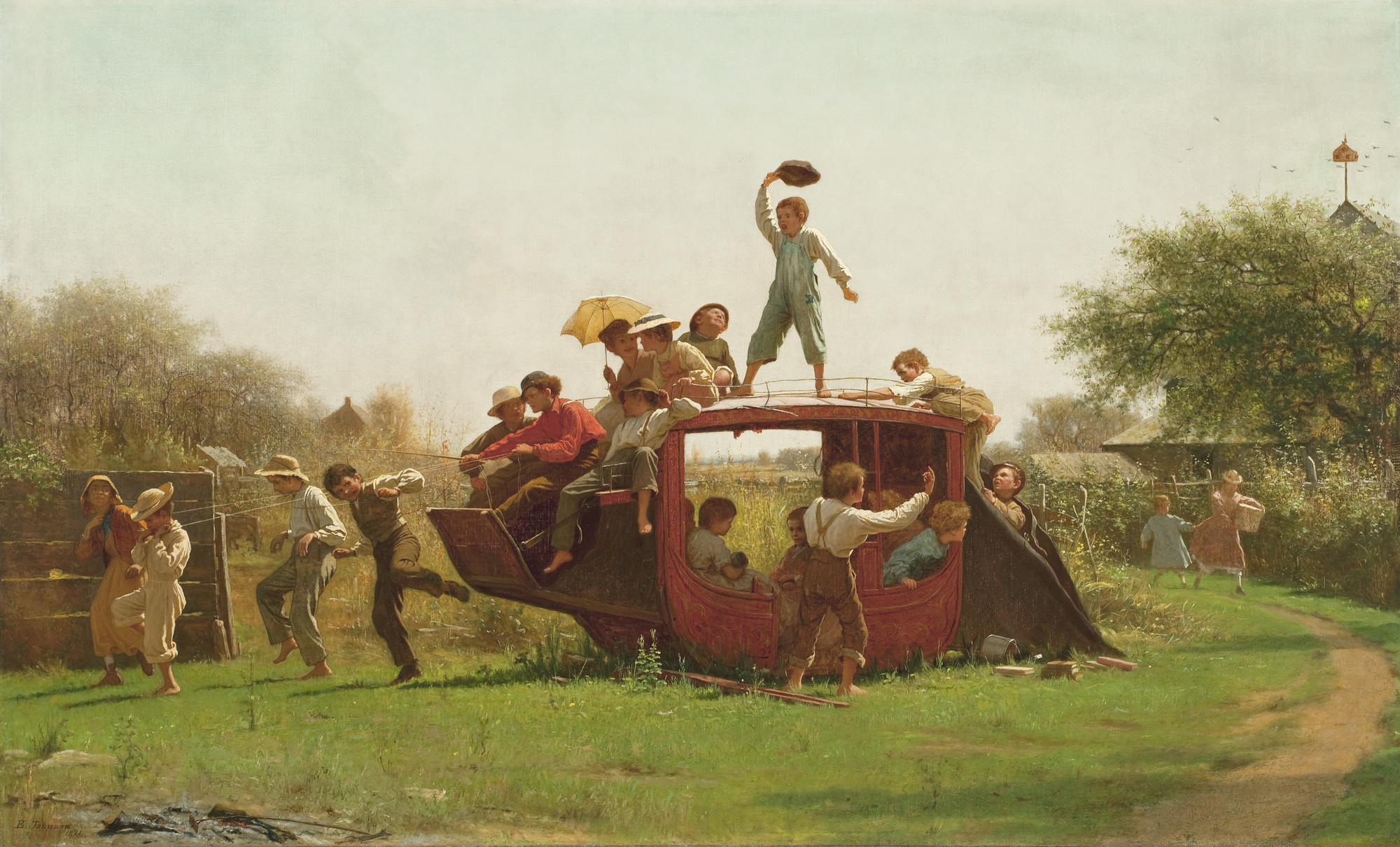
The old stagecoach

Roads were primitive and transporting products from the western end of the county to the Hudson River was very difficult. After legislative approval, it took 17 years to complete the Nyack Turnpike, a cross-country carriage road which connected Nyack to Suffern. The stagecoach which crossed the Ramapo Pass, was heavily traveled in winter when the Hudson River froze over to travel between Albany, New York and New York City.

=== Historic steamboats ===
With the lack of roads, travel was largely confined to sloops, which made regular trips up and down the river. Steamboats were built to travel up and down the Hudson, carrying both passengers and freight. Steamboats provided much of the transportation to New York City. Steamboat navigation in Rockland started with a local steam vessel named the "Orange" referred by some as "Pot-Cheese" in reference to her beauty and others “The Flying Dutchman" because of her speed. She provided regular schedule between Nyack and New York. The North River Steamboat or North River (often erroneously referred to as Clermont) is widely regarded as the world's first commercially successful steamboat. It was not until twenty years later that a boat was used that could be depended on to make a round trip in one day attracting competition from steamboats later built at Haverstraw and Tappan. To facilitate steamboat traffic from Tappan Landing, a road was built over the marshes to the end of a 500-foot pier, which within a few years became the terminus of the New York & Erie Railroad. The construction of this road was an invaluable aid in the development of the county. It caused the building of Piermont with its lone pier which made possible the founding of a half dozen villages and opened the way to the utilization of the mineral and agricultural resources of Rockland. Other railroads followed. The first steamer bringing passengers to the railroad for the historic trip from Piermont to Ramapo was named "South American" and the steamer "Utica" brought passengers from New York City on the opening of the Erie railroad to Goshen, New York.

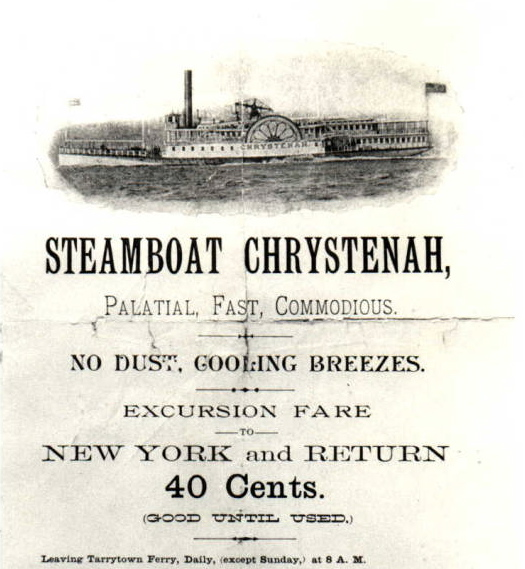
Chrystenah handbill

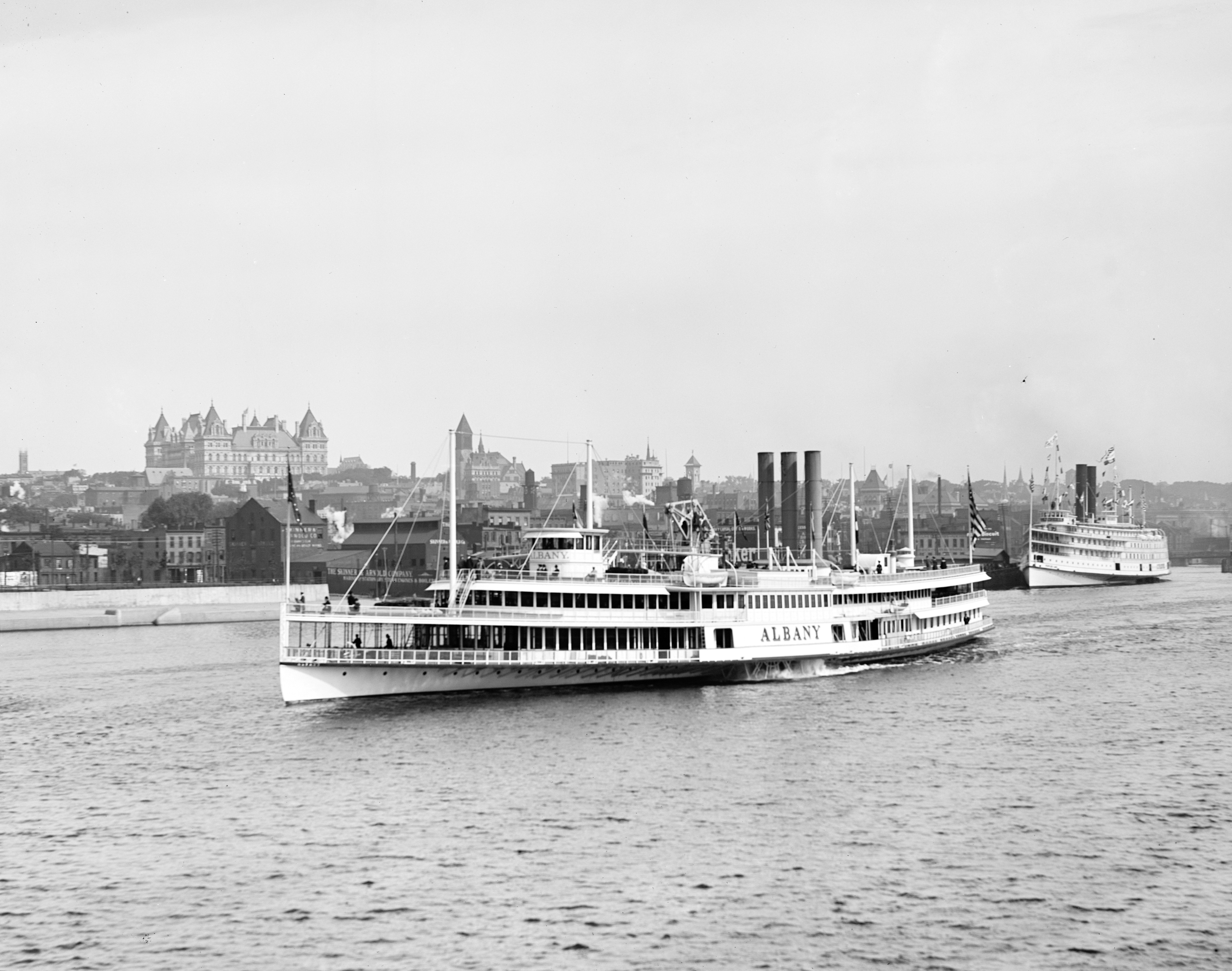
Steamship Albany

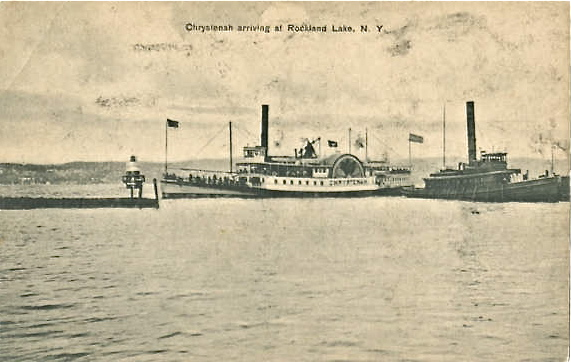
Chrystenah at Rockland Lake

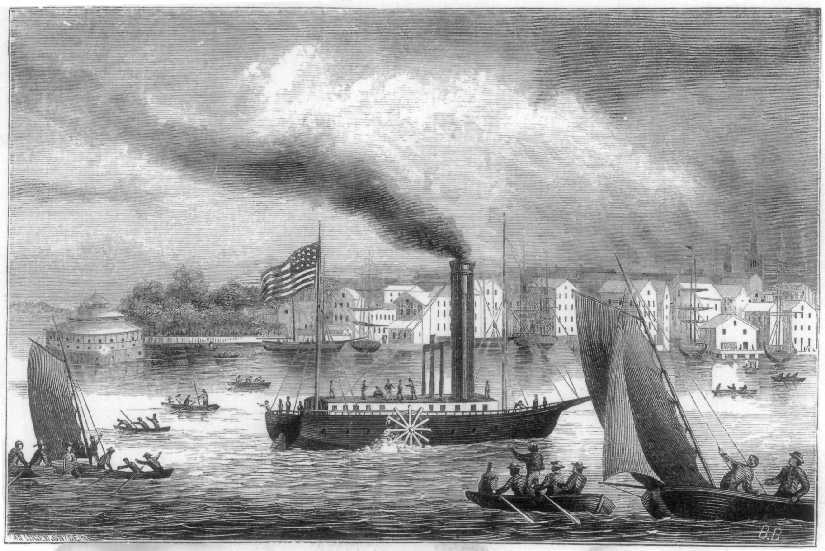
Clermont

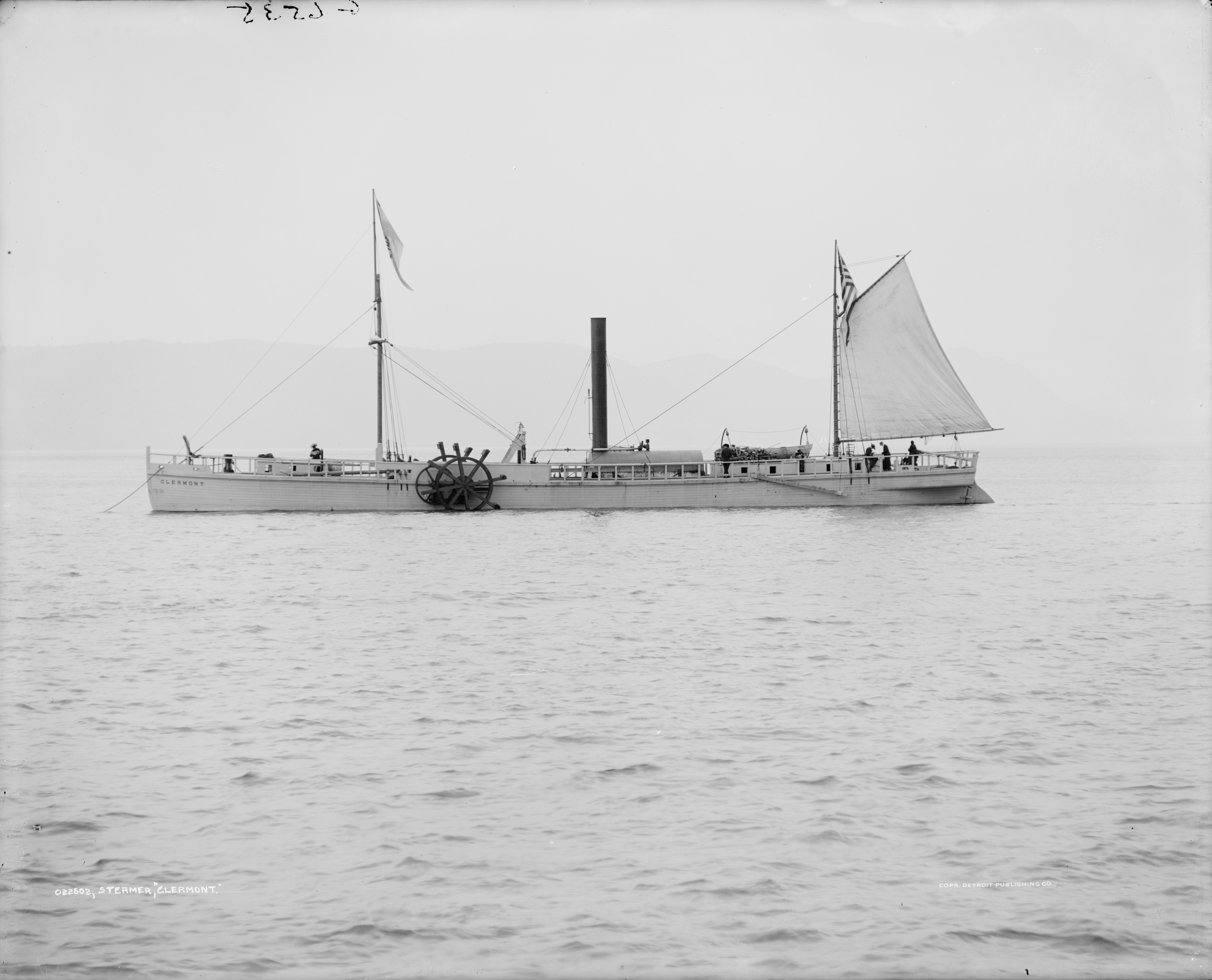
Clermont Replica

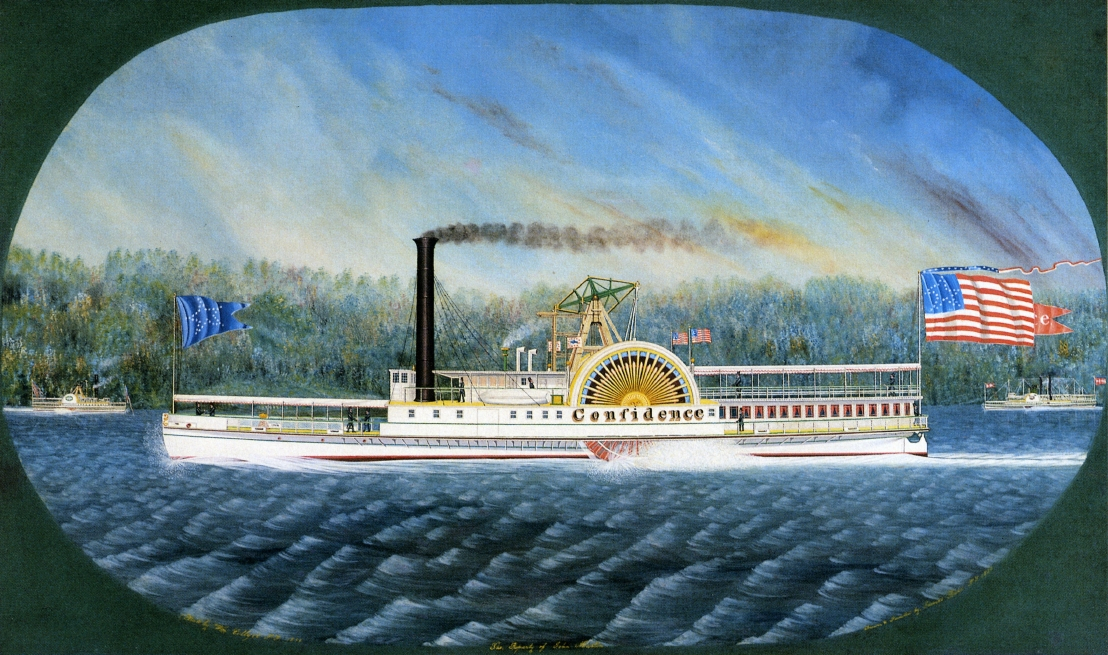
Confidence

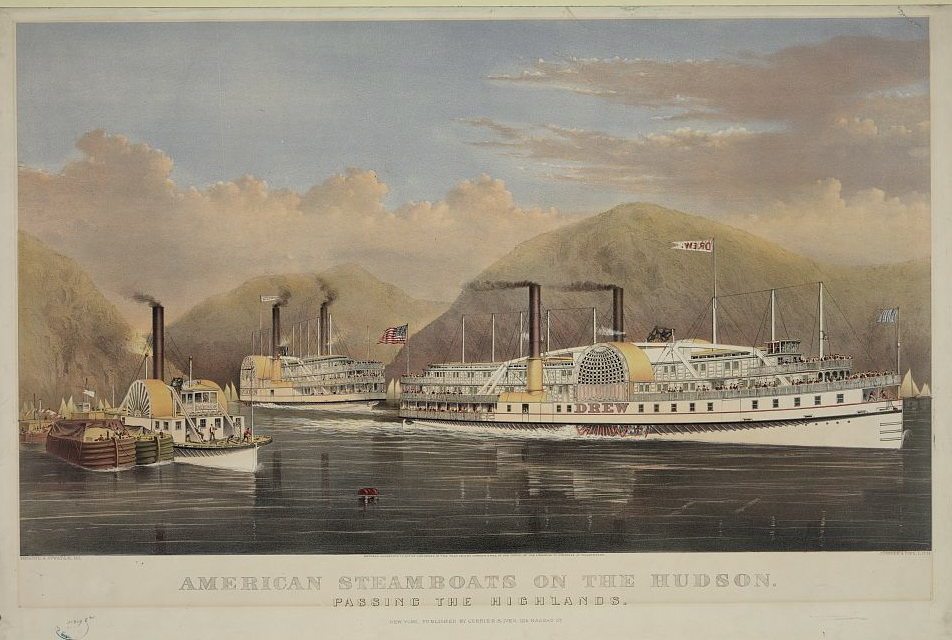
Drew

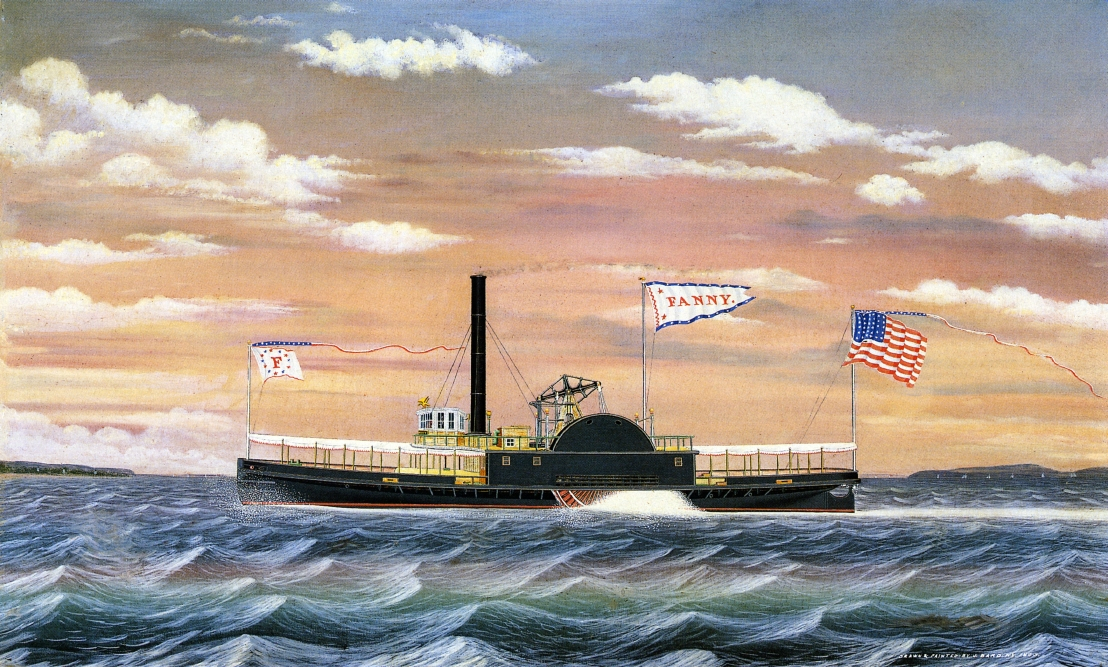
Fanny

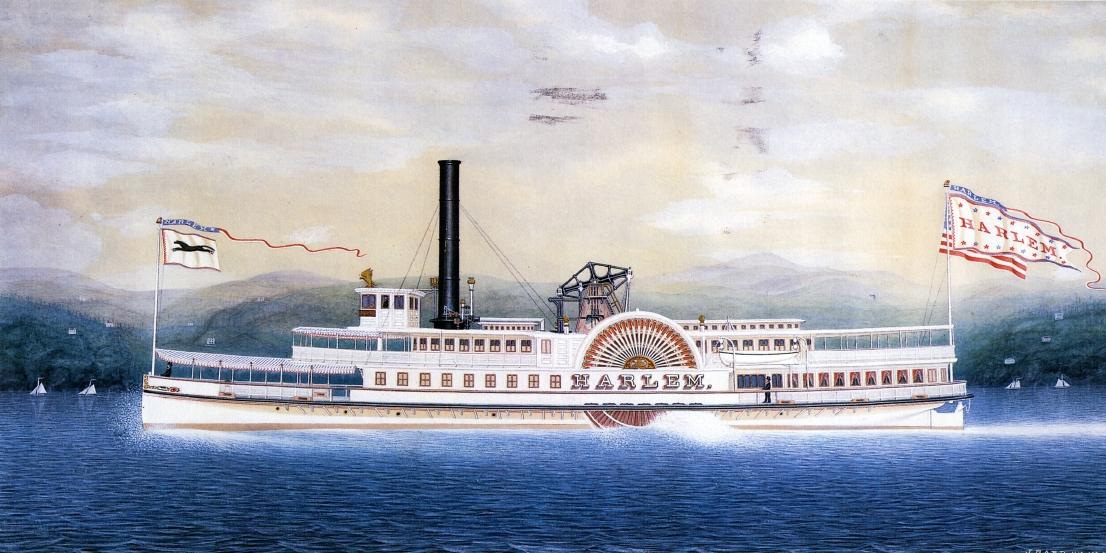
Harlem

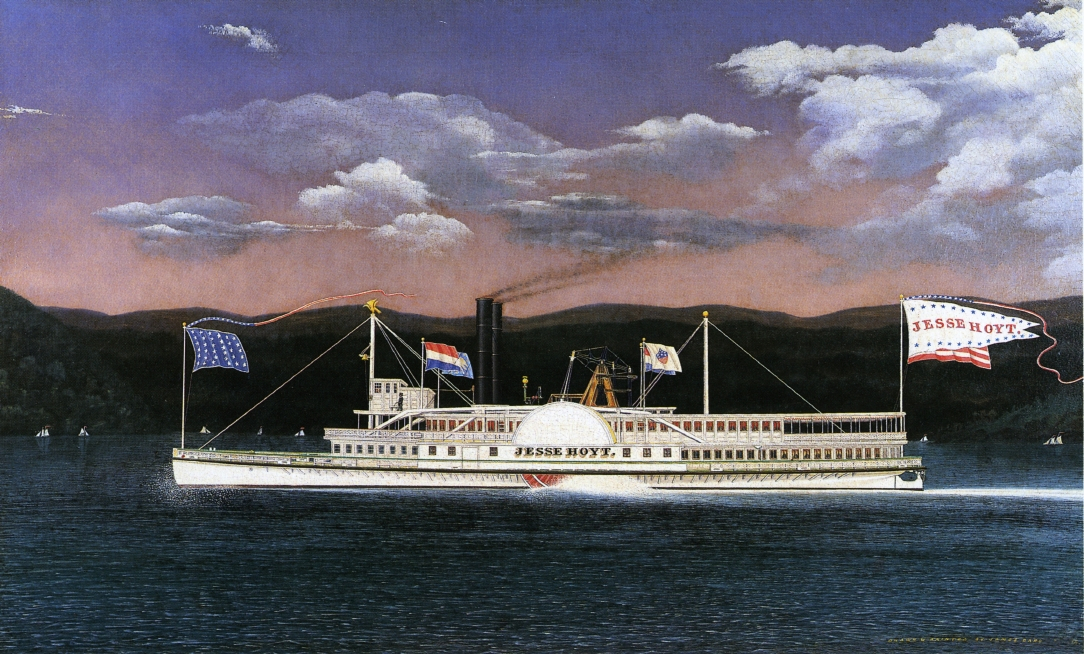
Jesse Hoyt

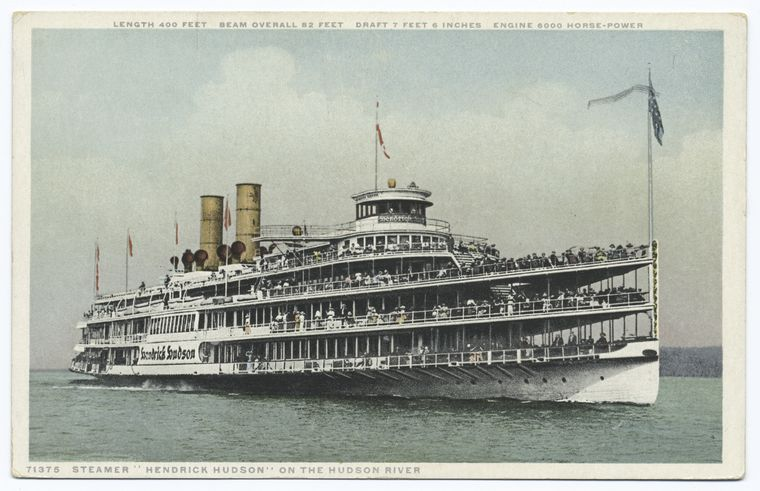
Hendrick Hudson

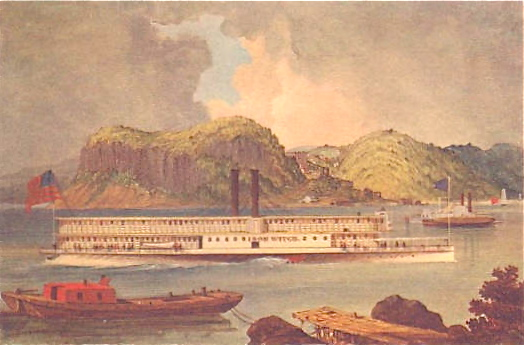
Iron Witch

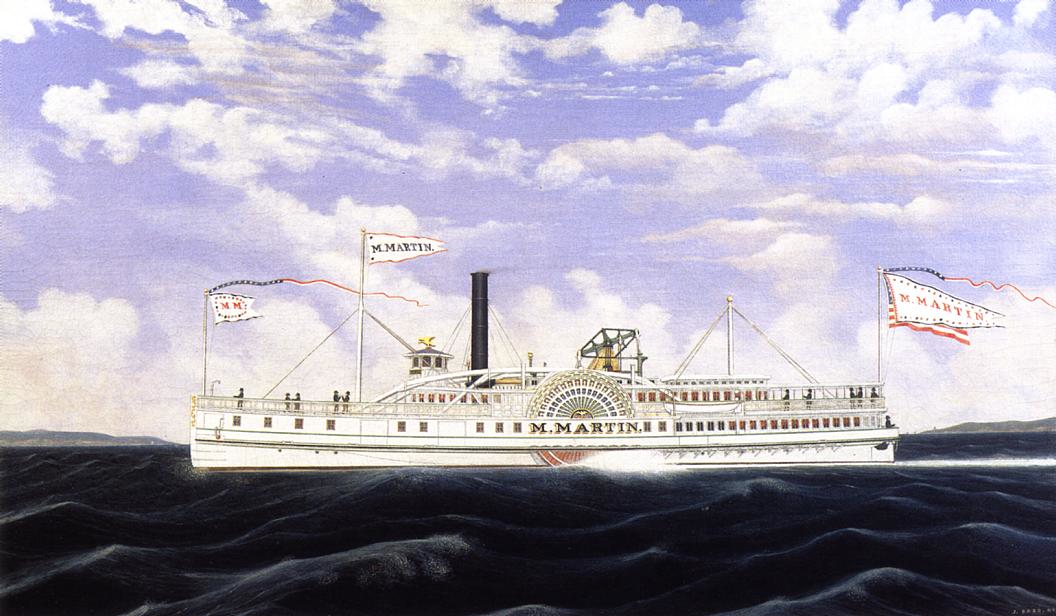
Milton Martin

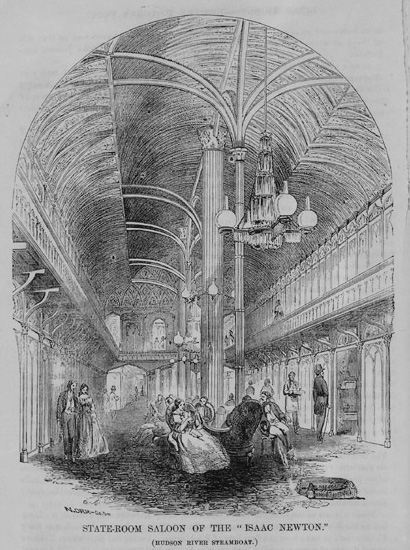
Isaac Newton

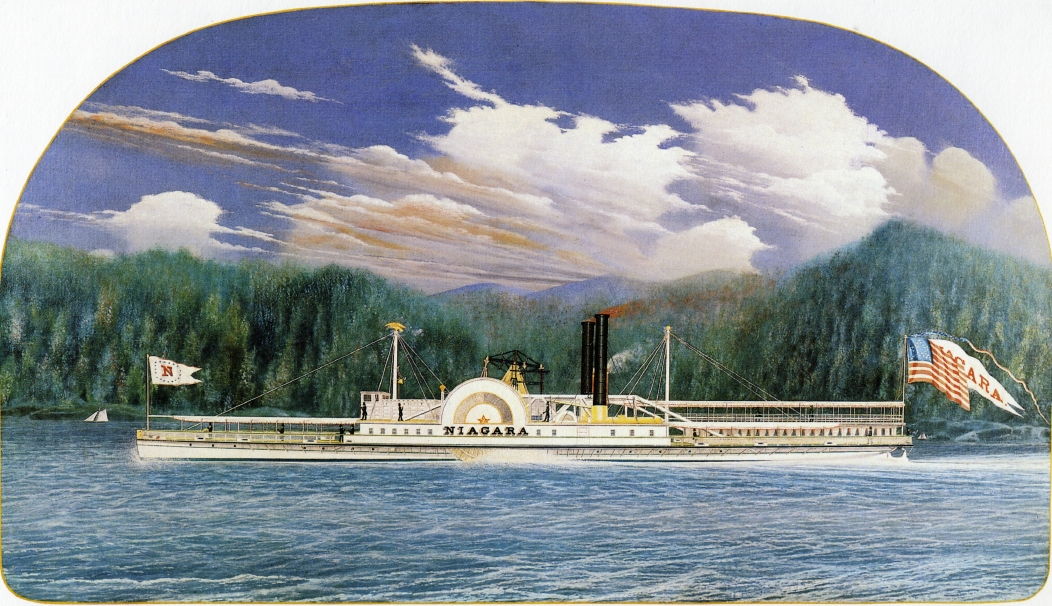
Niagara

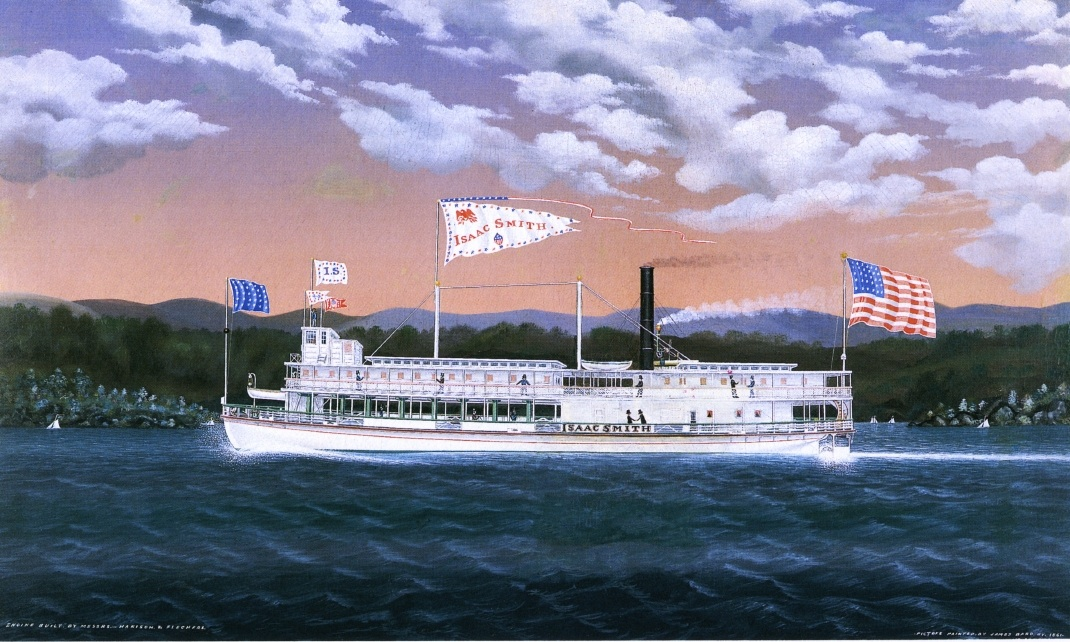
Isaac Smith

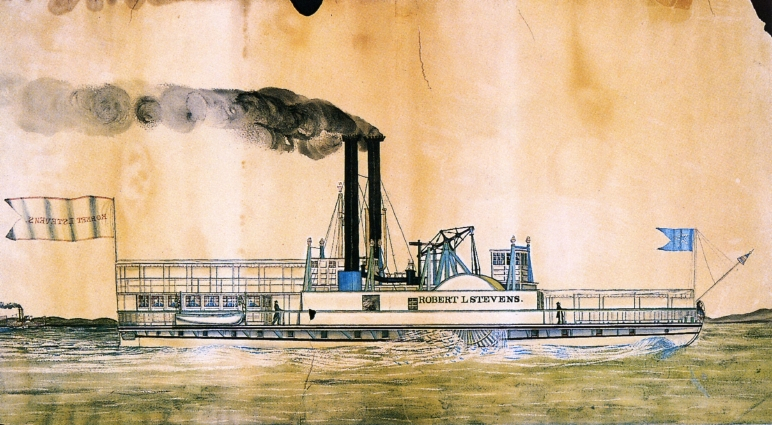
Robert L. Stevens

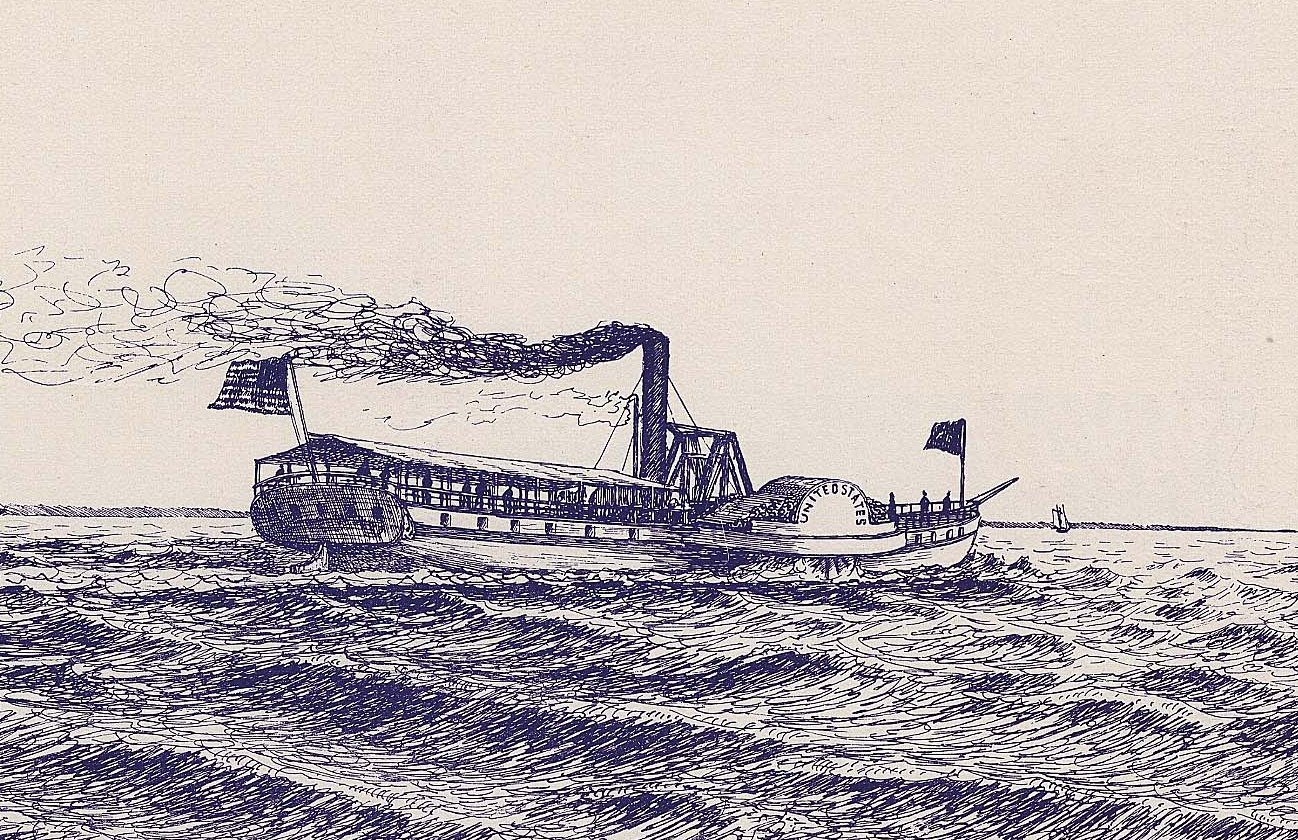
United States

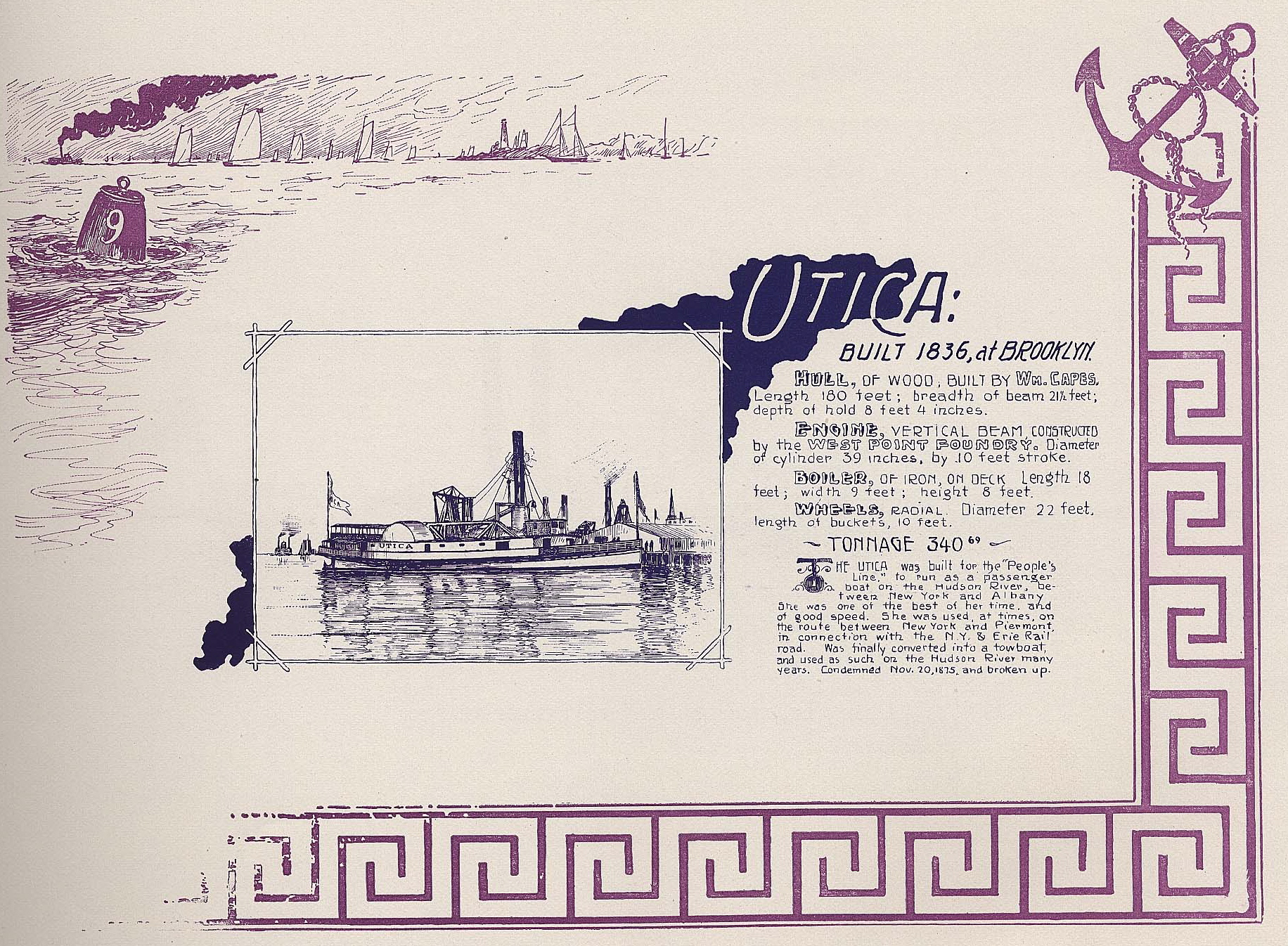
Utica

Hudson River Day liners included PS Alexander Hamilton, PS Chauncey Vibbard, PS Washington Irving

Prominent Hudson River steamboats included Chancellor Livingston (1816), James Kent (1823), DeWitt Clinton (1828), Robert L. Stevens (1835), Rip Van Winkle (1845), Isaac Newton (1846), Daniel Drew (1860), Thomas Cornell (1863), Chauncey Vibbard (1864), Dean Richmond(1864), Charles W. Morse (1904), Hendrick Hudson (1906), Robert Fulton (1909) constructed or engines built by Allaire Iron Works, Cornelius H. DeLamater, Harlan and Hollingsworth, Jonh Stevens, W. & A. Fletcher Company, West Point Foundry.

=== Historic railroads ===
In 1833, a charter was given to the New York and Erie Railroad, which had trains running in the county by 1840. New York and Erie Railroad was completed in 1851 becoming the longest railroad in the US stretching 483 miles from Piermont to Dunkirk on Lake Erie and the second-longest railroad in the world. The President of the United States, Millard Fillmore, 13th President of the United States and the Secretary of State, Daniel Webster, along with a score of national and state officials, boarded the train at the Piermont Pier for the first trip. Back in the 19th century railroads, freight and passenger lines, were instrumental for the development, growth and prosperity of Rockland County. Many of the hamlets and villages were built near the Depots. Most of the Post Offices were built near the stations. Passengers traveling to New York City would board steamers at Piermont. The first five locomotives were "Eleazar Lord", "Piermont", ""Rockland", "Orange" and "Ramapo" respectively.

(A) The New Jersey & New York Railroad – 1875 (B) New City Branch NJ&NY Railroad (C) Erie Railroad Piermont Branch −1870 (D) Northern Railroad of NJ – 1859 (E) New York, West Shore & Buffalo Railroad −1883 (F) Main Line (G) Sterlington Mountain Railway – May 18, 1864.

West Shore & Buffalo Railroad

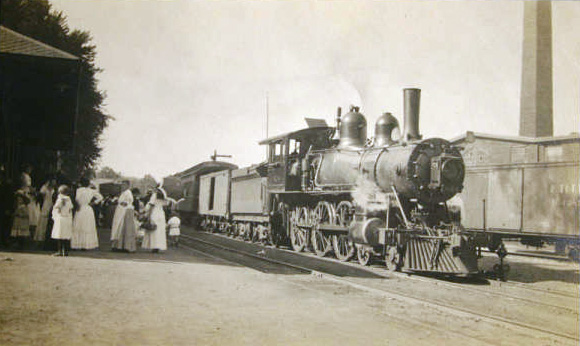
Pearl River Railroad Station

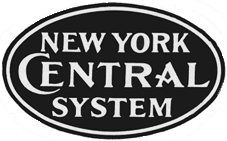

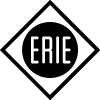

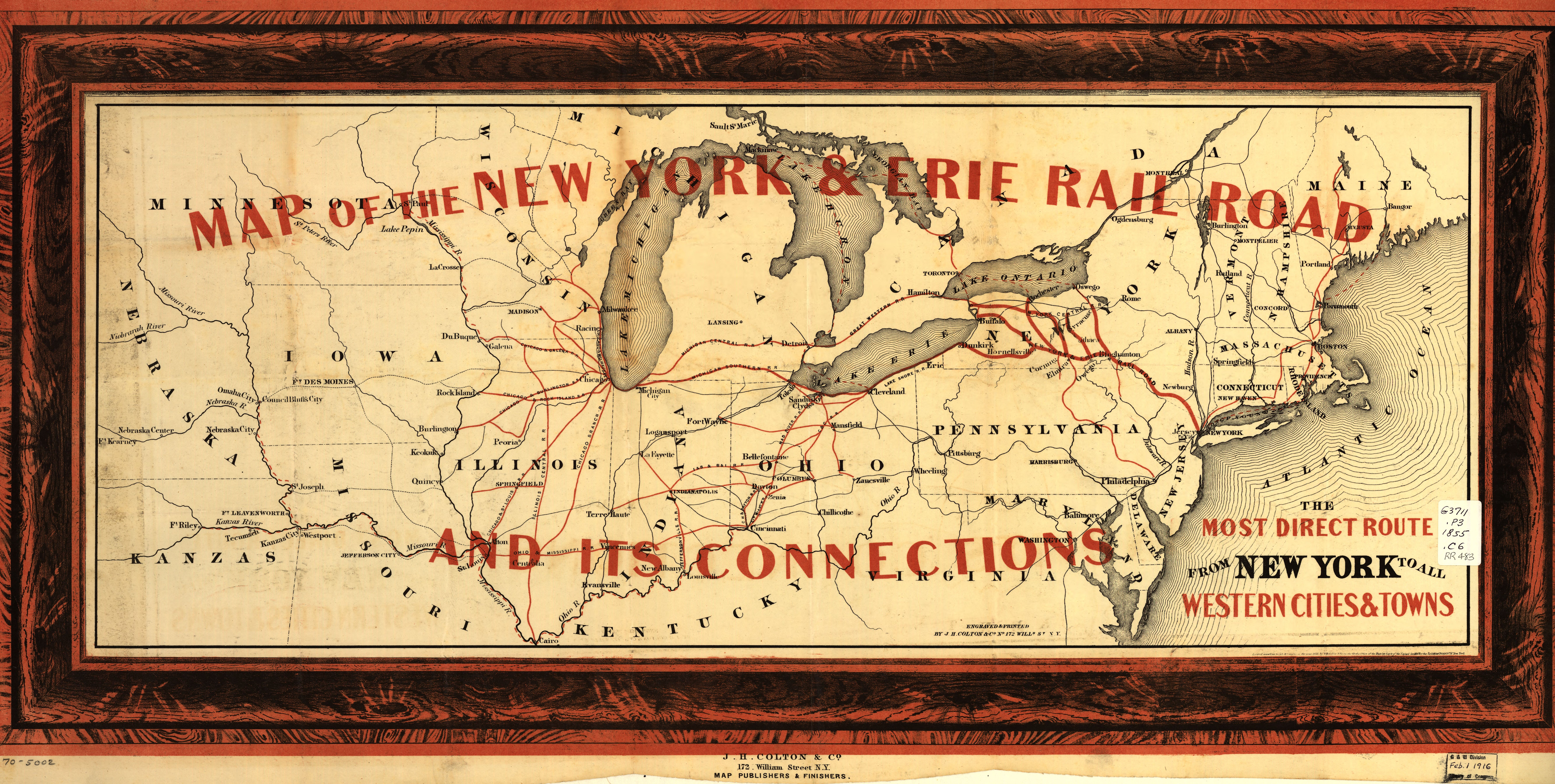

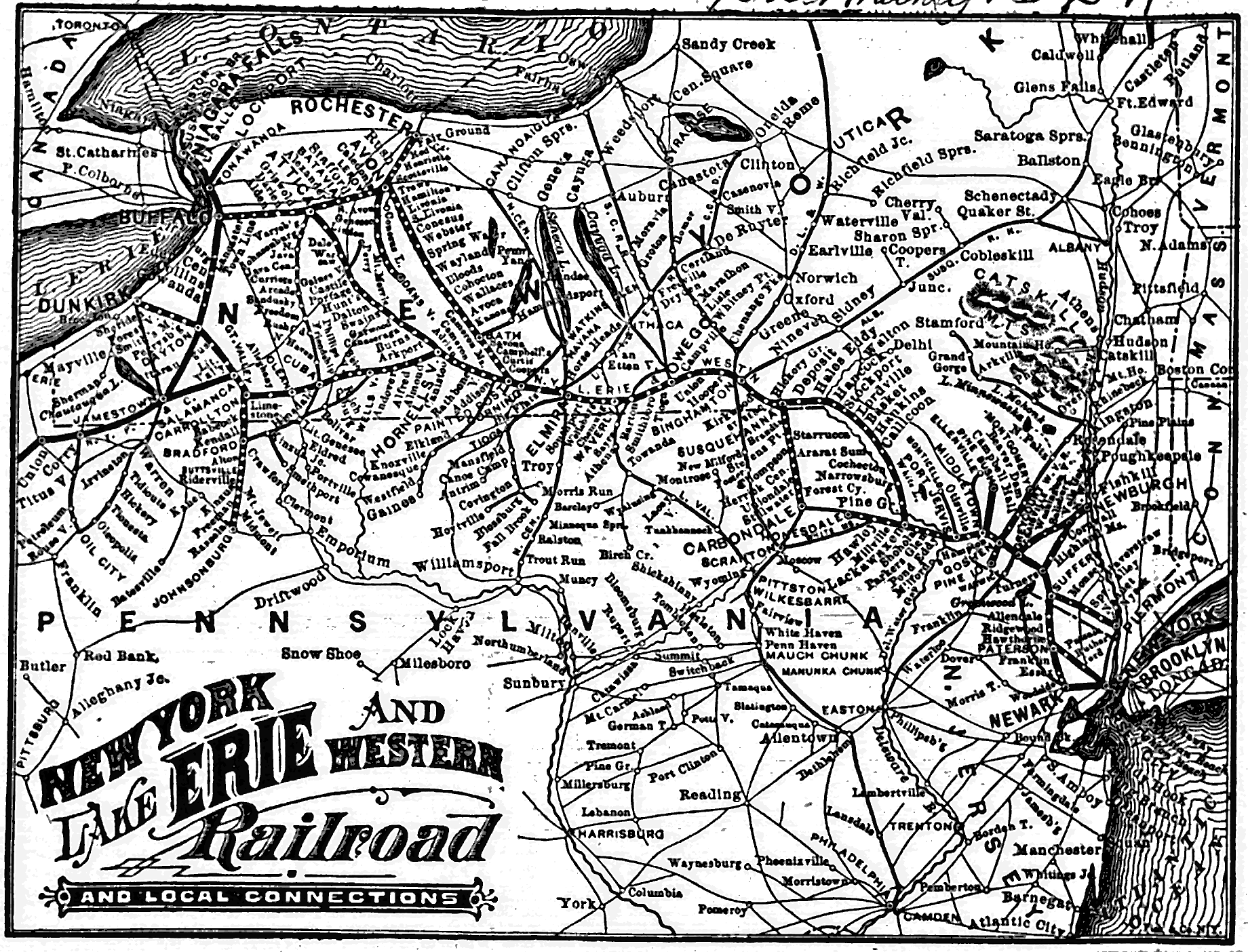

- -(A)-
  - Pearl River station
  - Nanuet Crossing
  - Spring Valley
  - Union
  - New Hempstead
  - Summit Park
  - Alexis
  - Pomona
  - Mount Ivy
  - Theills
  - West Haverstraw
  - Haverstraw
- -(B)-
  - Nanuet Crossing
  - Bardonia
  - Germonds
  - Durant
  - New City
- -(C)-
  - Piermont station
  - Orangeburg
  - Blauvelt
  - Nanuet Crossing
  - Spring Valley
  - Monsey
  - Tallman
  - Suffern
- -(D)-
  - Sparkill
  - Piermont
  - Grandview
  - South Nyack
  - Nyack
- -(E)-
  - Tappan
  - Orangeburg
  - Blauveltville
  - Rockland Park
  - Nyack Turnpike
  - Valley Cottage
  - Congers
  - Haverstraw
    - (Fairmont Ave)
  - West Haverstraw
    - (Crugers by ferry)
  - Stony Point
  - Tomkins Cove
  - Jones Point
  - Iona Island
- -(F)-
  - Suffern station
  - Hillburn
  - Ramapo
  - Sterlington
  - Sloatsburg
- -(G)-
  - Suffern
  - Sterlington

== Places of interest ==
=== Rockland County's rocks ===
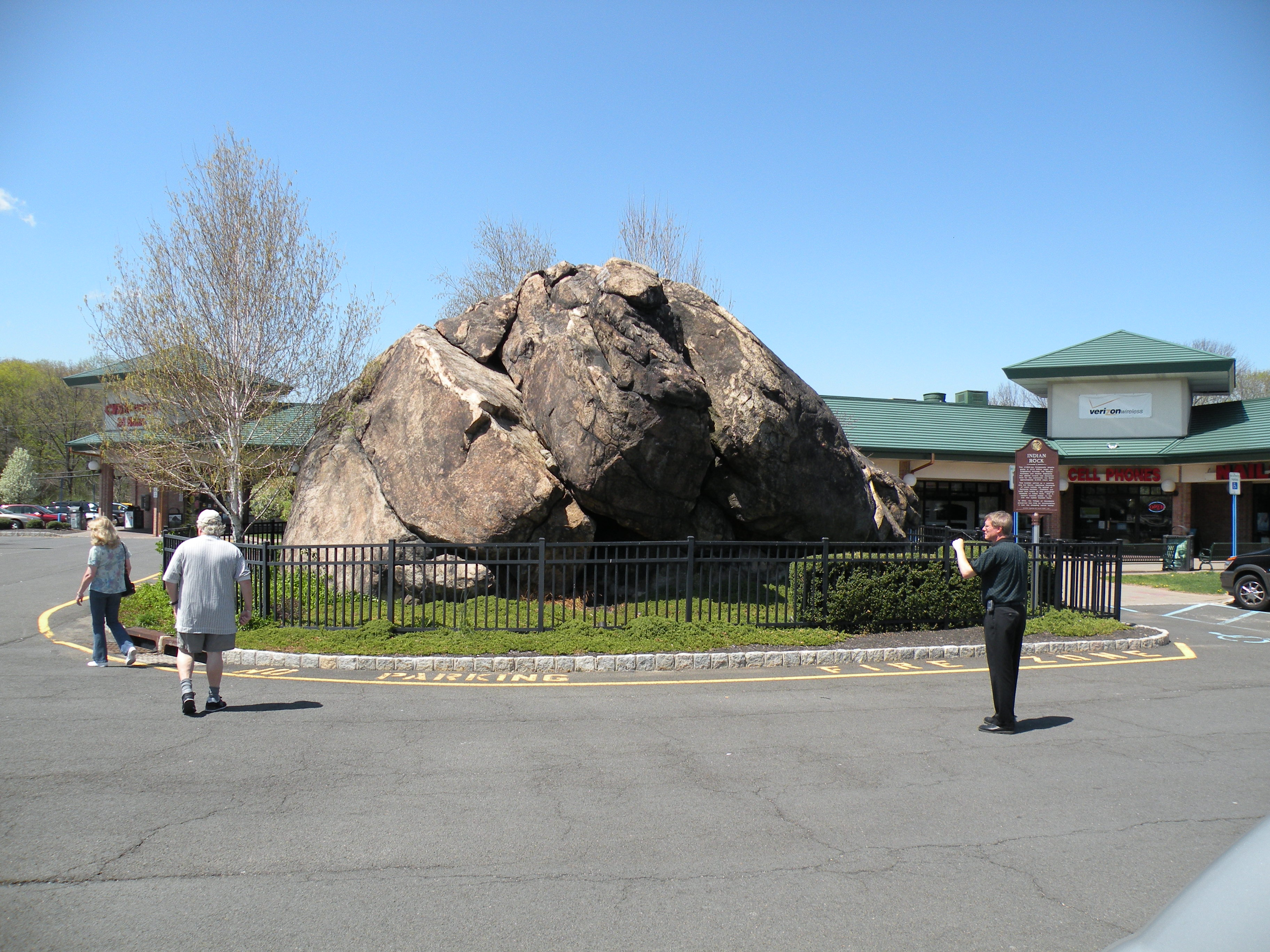
Indian Rock

- Indian Rock – This 17,300-ton Proterozoic granite gneiss is .8–1.2 billion years old. Originating between the Ramapo Mountains and Hudson Highlands, this glacial erratic was deposited in Montebello by the Laurentide Ice Sheet approximately 21,000 years ago.
- Maria's Rock – Front lawn of Pfizer/Wyeth – (Lederle Laboratories), North Middletown Road in Pearl River – An 18th-century legend tells of a little girl named Maria who wandered from her home in nearby Tappan and died of hunger and exposure. Tradition says that villagers found her bones near the massive boulder.
- Spook Rock is the largest of the cluster of rocks located on Spook Rock Road and Highview Avenue in Airmont. The Tappan and Warawankogs of the Lenni-Lenape Wolf Tribes, an Algonquian people, worshipped the sun, moon, stars, and a spirit called Manitou. Story has it that a Dutch farmer's daughter was sacrificed at this site and her ghost appears on the anniversary of her death.

=== The Dunderberg Spiral Railway ===
A pleasure railroad partially constructed in 1890–1891 and never finished. The first part of the ride would have taken the cars up two inclined planes to the summit 900 feet (270 m) above the Hudson River, where visitors could disembark to enjoy the scenery. Then the cars would have coasted by gravity down a nine-mile (14 km) scenic railway, making two spirals and three switchbacks. It would have been to this day the biggest roller coaster ever constructed.

=== Piermont hand-cranked drawbridge ===
The Piermont hand-cranked drawbridge was originally built in 1880 by The King Iron Bridge Company, a Cleveland company in the state of Ohio that constructed more than 10,000 bridges over six decades. The hand-cranked drawbridge is used as a pedestrian walkway providing a link to Tallman Mountain State Park. This bridge is the only hand-cranked drawbridge in Rockland County and perhaps in the United States. Back in the day, fishermen on sloops heading up and down the creek got out of their vessel, cranked up the drawbridge, sailed across, got out of their vessel and cranked down the drawbridge for vehicular traffic. The whole bridge was dismantled piece by piece, sent off-site for restoration and restored to its original state after a complete forensic analysis. Allan King Sloan, the great-great-grandson of the company's founder, provided some of the information that is on the historical marker nearby and attended the dedication ceremony on August 7, 2009.

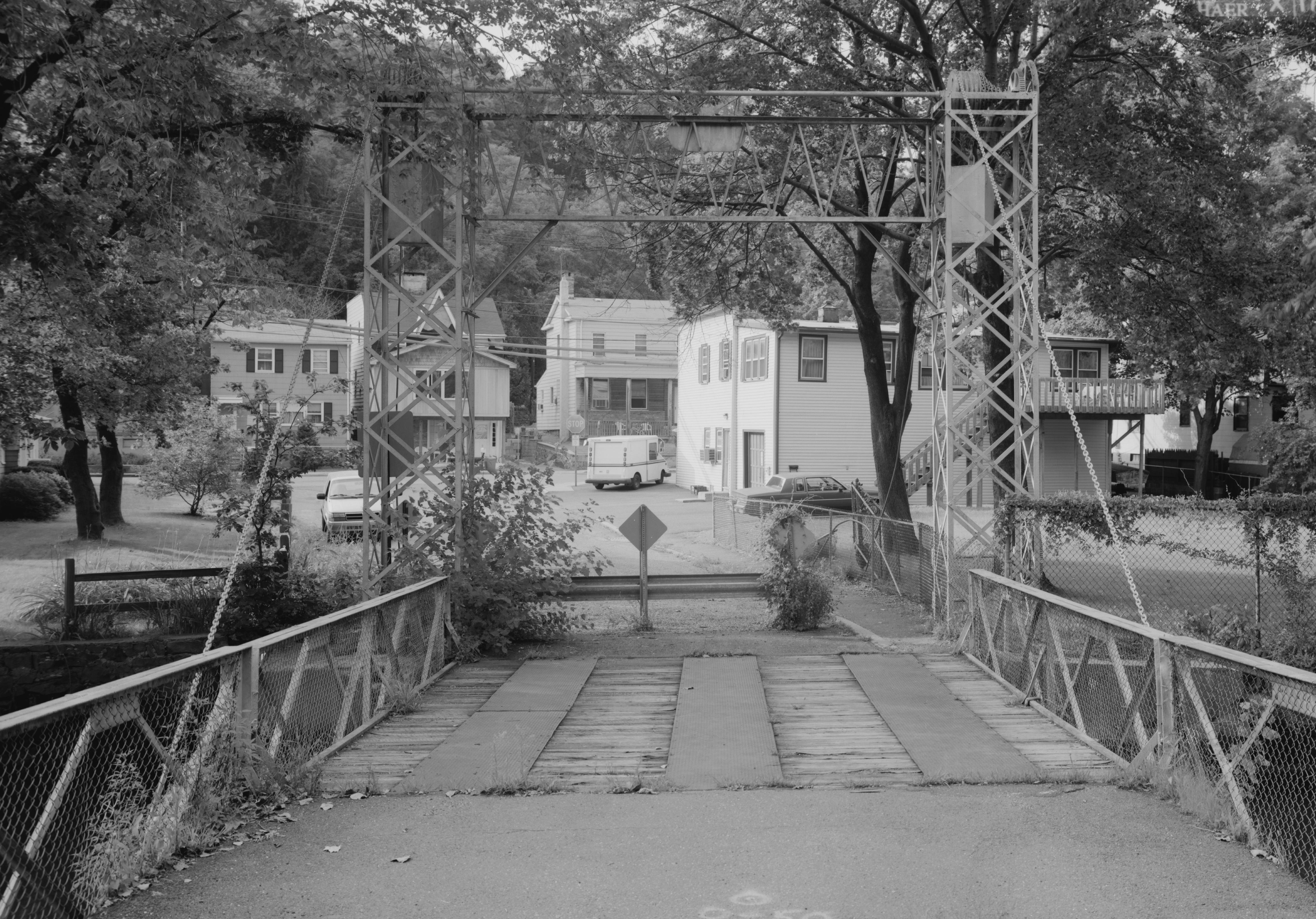
Sparkill Creek Drawbridge (1994)

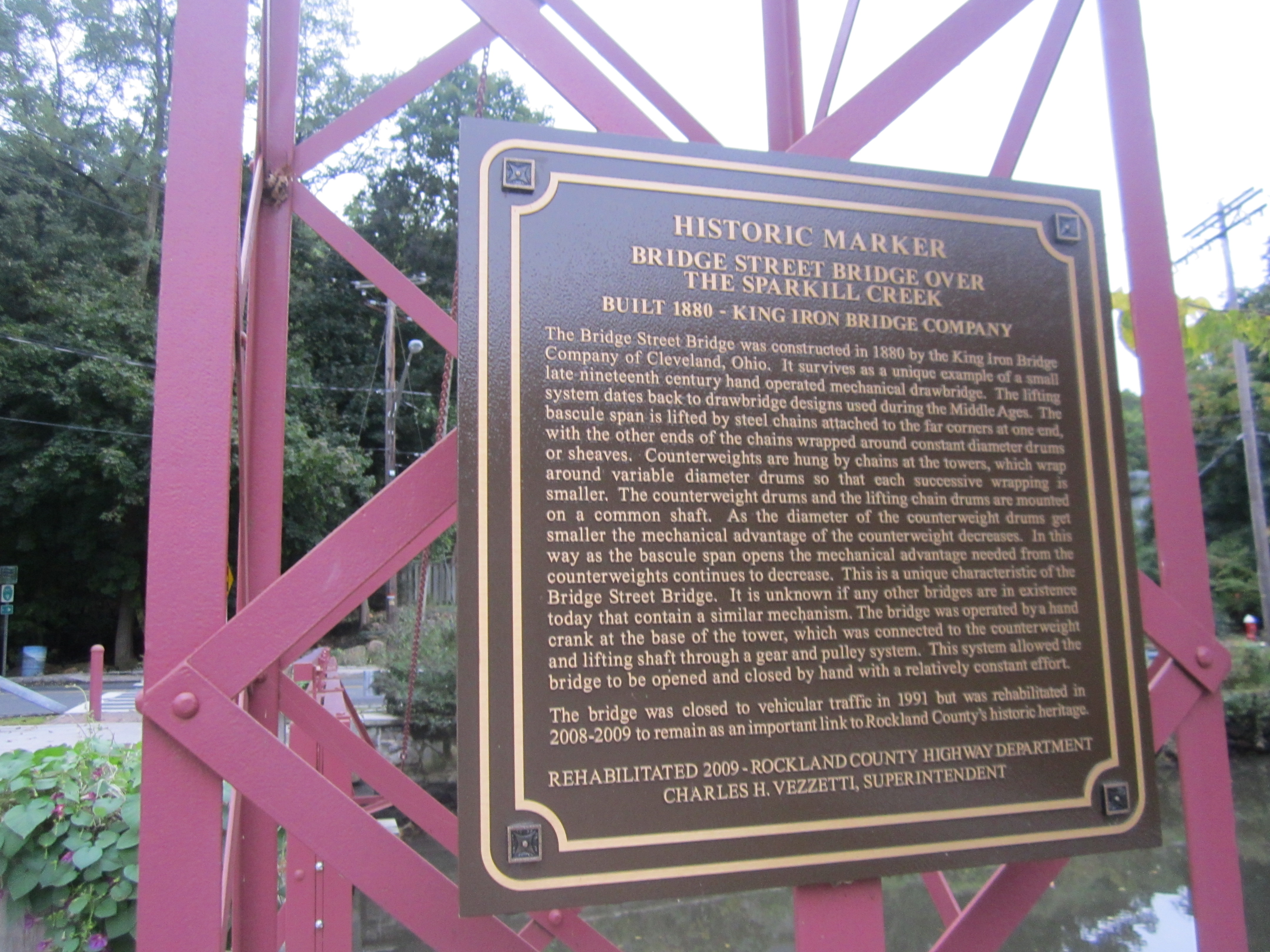
Historical Marker 2009

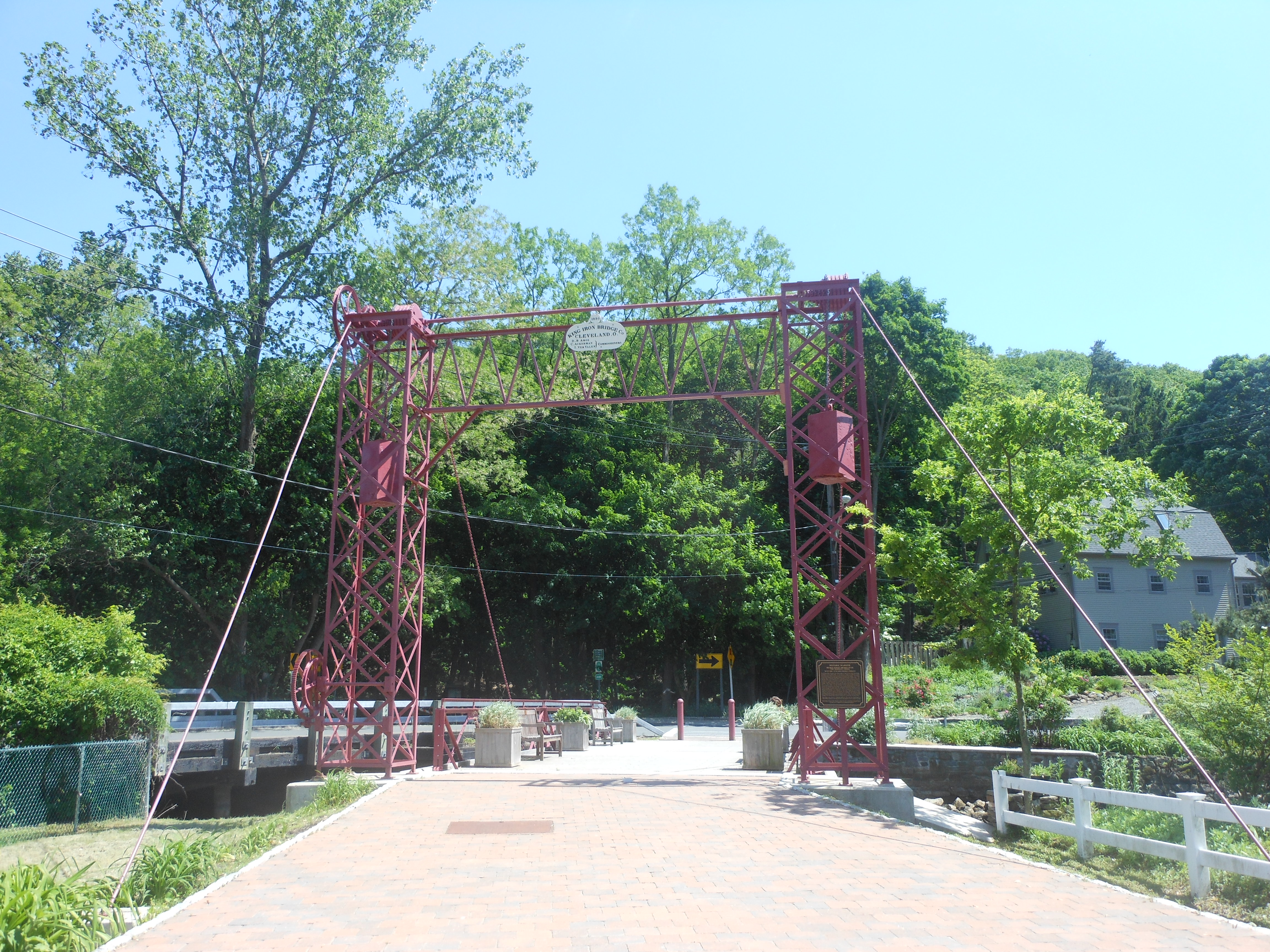
Renovated Drawbridge (2012)

== Art gallery ==
=== Historic paintings ===
The following artists studied at the Hudson River School:

- Jasper Francis Cropsey (February 18, 1823 – April 23, 1900)

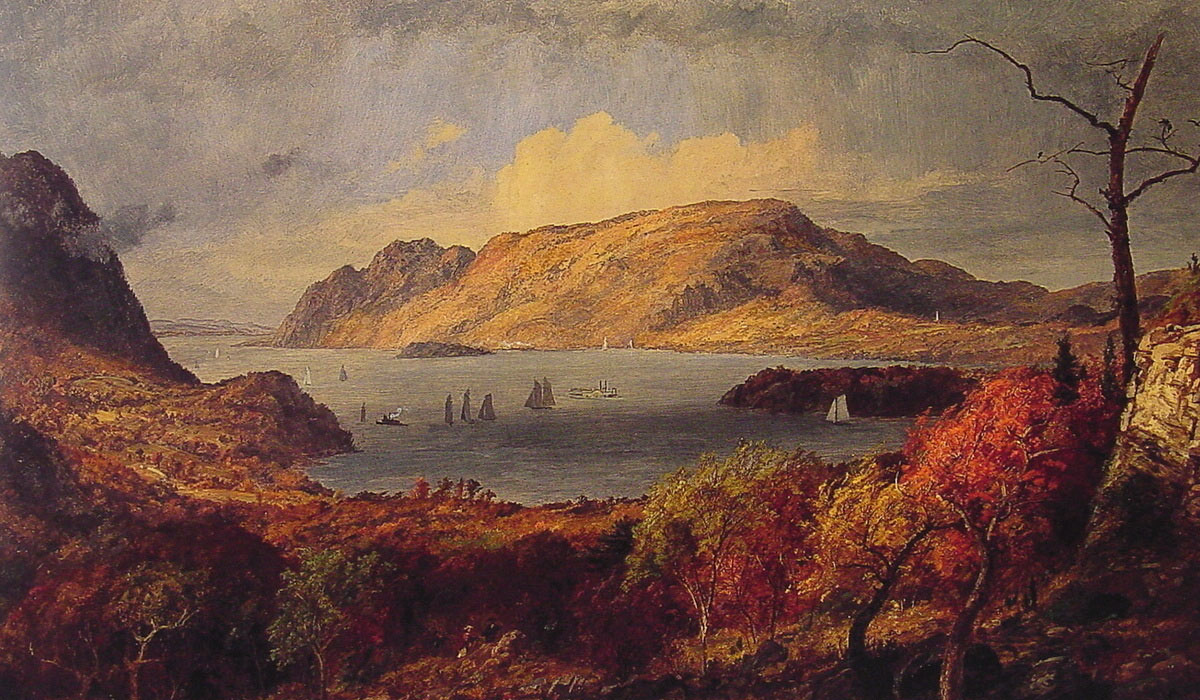
Gates of the Hudson

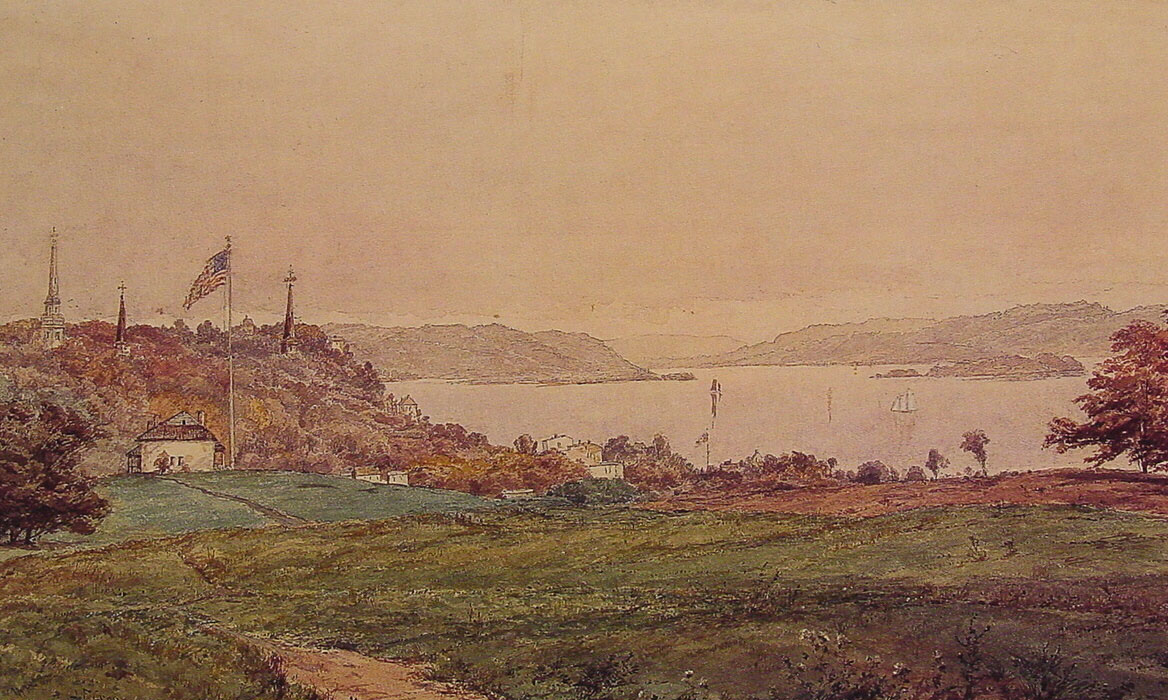
Looking North on the Hudson

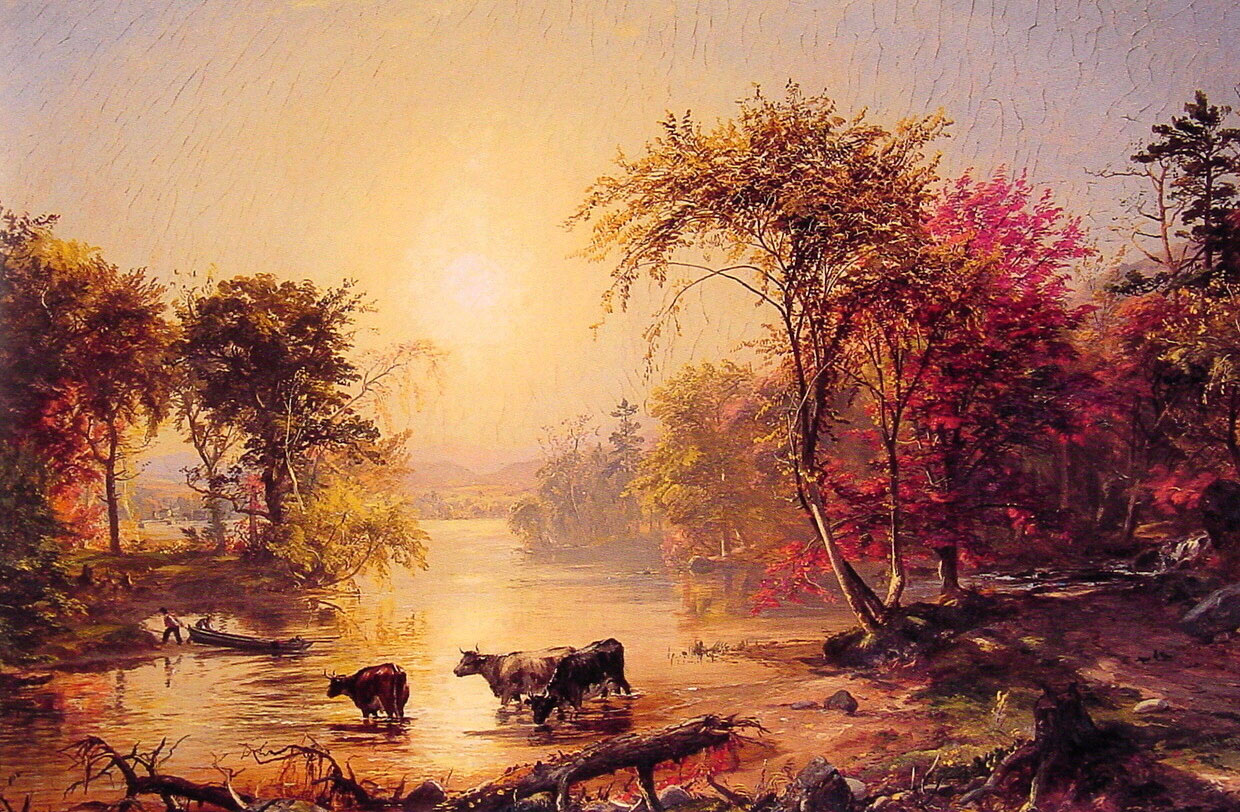
Autumn in America

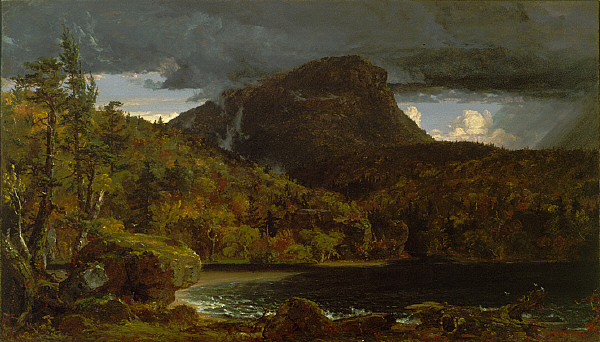
High Torne Mountain

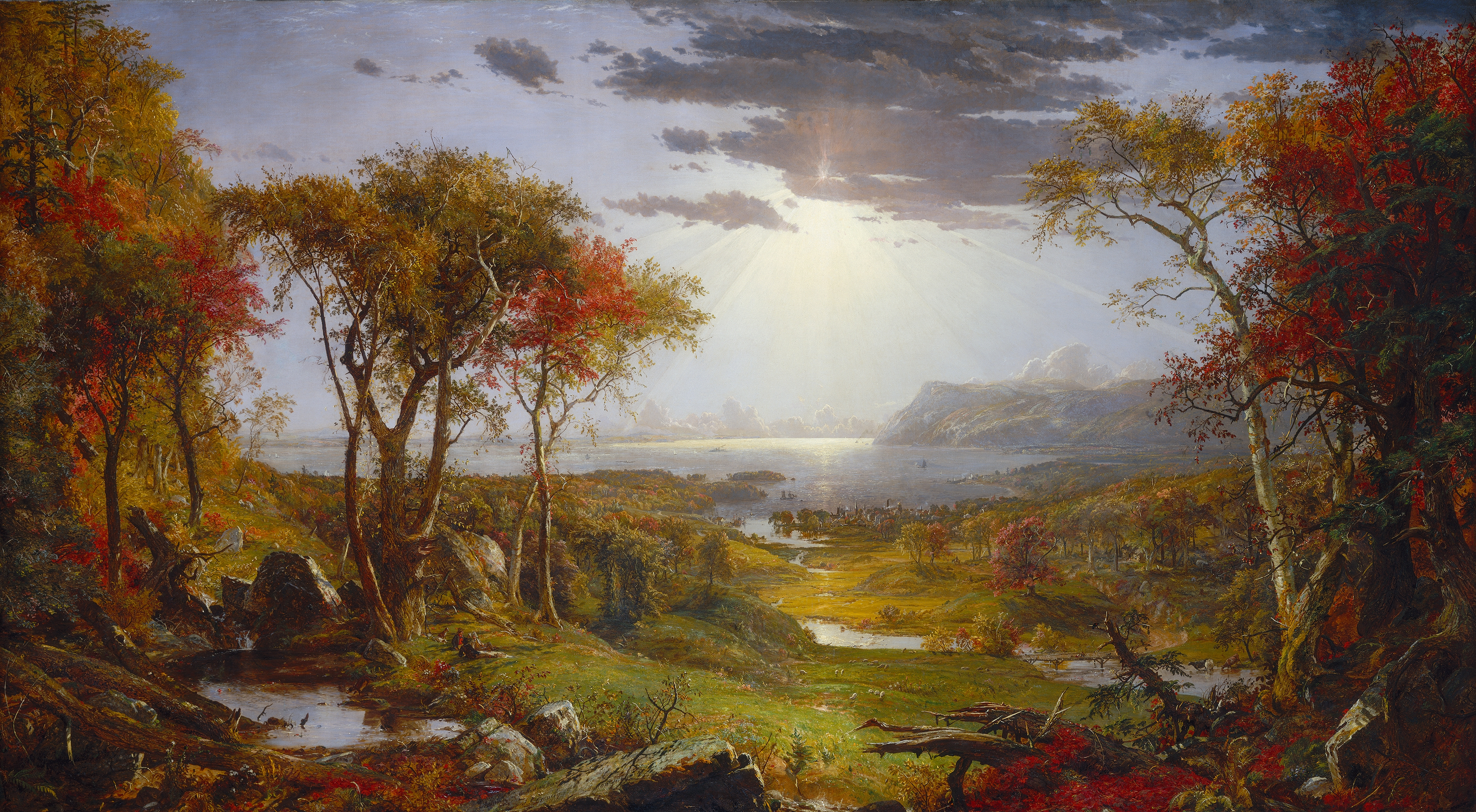
On the Hudson River

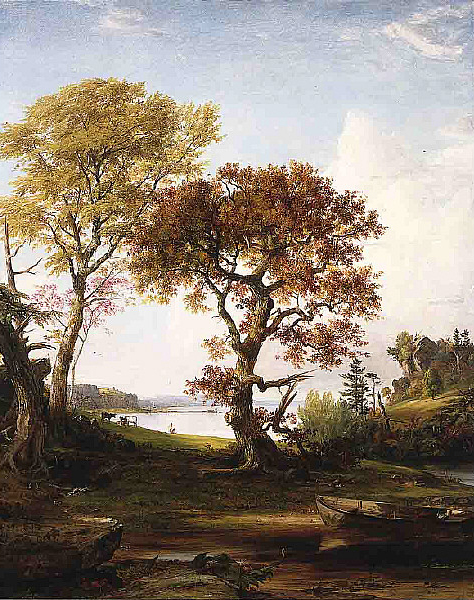
The Hudson at Piermont

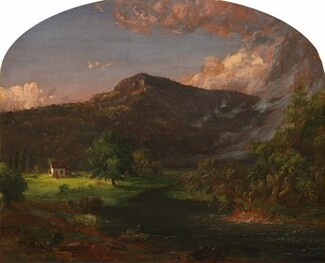
Tourn Mountain, Headquarters of Washington, Rockland Co., New York

- Francis Augustus Silva (American, 1835–1886).
  - The Hudson at the Tappan Zee, 1876.
- Asher Brown Durand (August 21, 1796 – September 17, 1886)
  - Hudson River Scene, 1846.
  - Hudson River Landscape, Date Unknown
- Régis François Gignoux (1816–1882)
  - First Snow Along the Hudson River
- James McDougal Hart (May 10, 1828 – October 24, 1901)
  - Harriman New York Overlooking the Hudson
- Thomas Cole (1801–1848)
  - Sunny Morning on the Hudson River
- Jervis McEntee (1828–1891)
  - Tomkins Cove

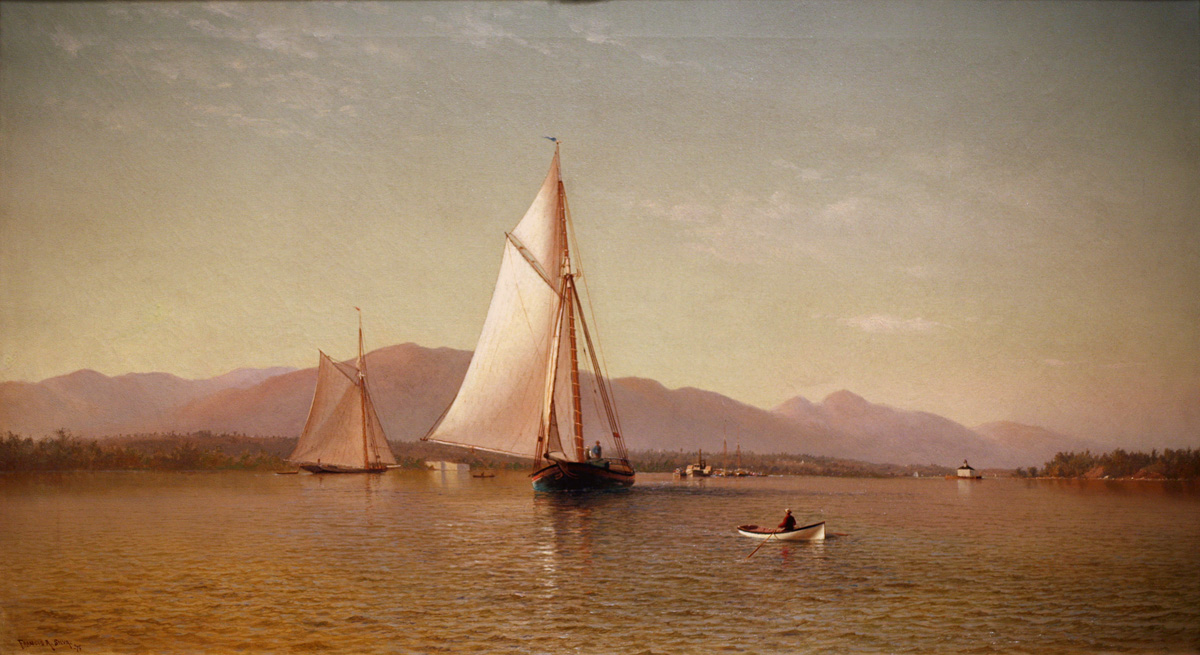
The Hudson at the Tappan Zee

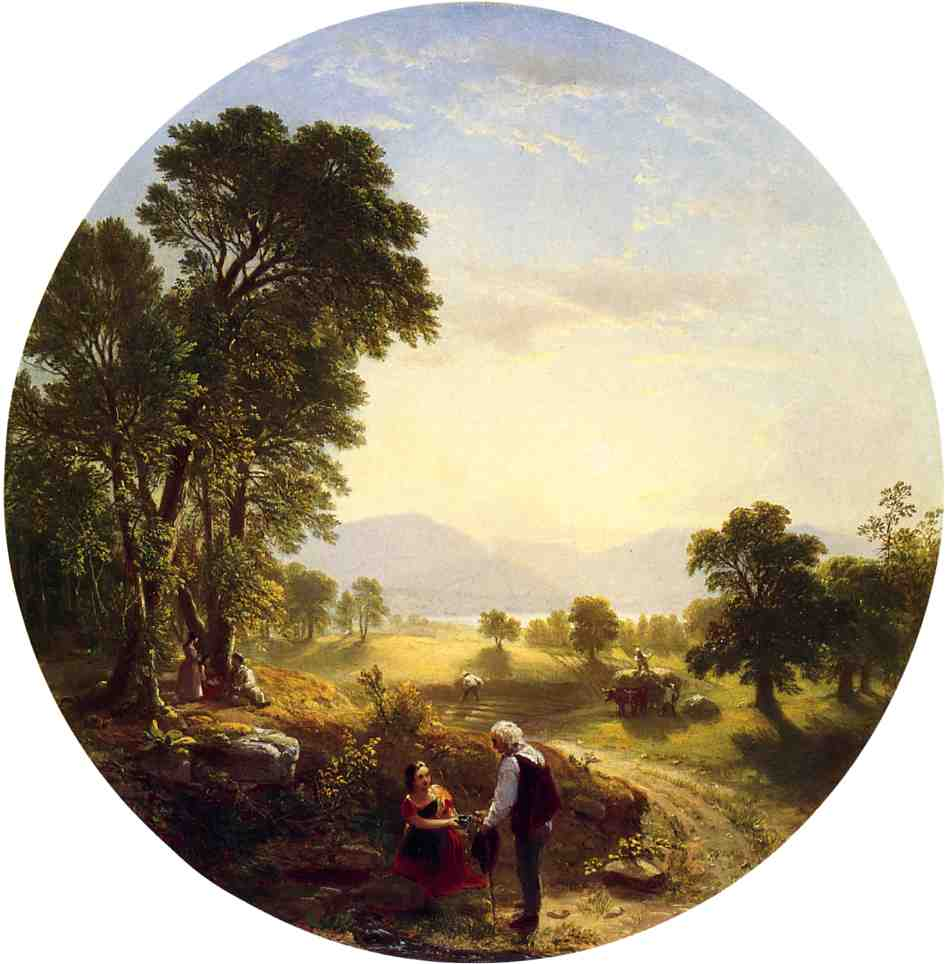
Hudson River Scene

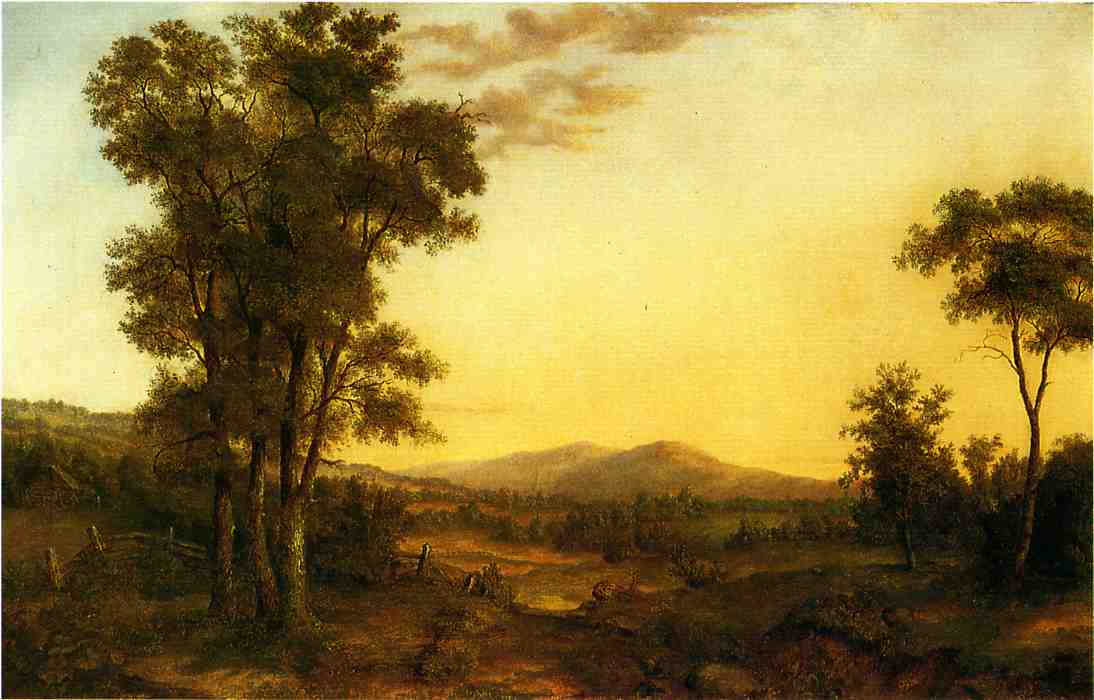
Hudson River Landscape

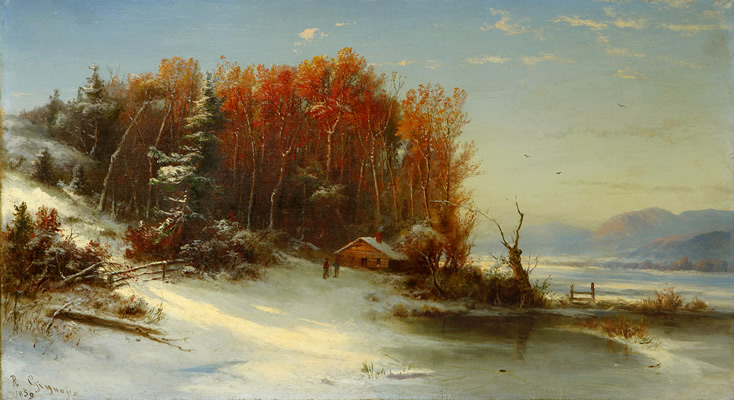
First Snow Along the Hudson River

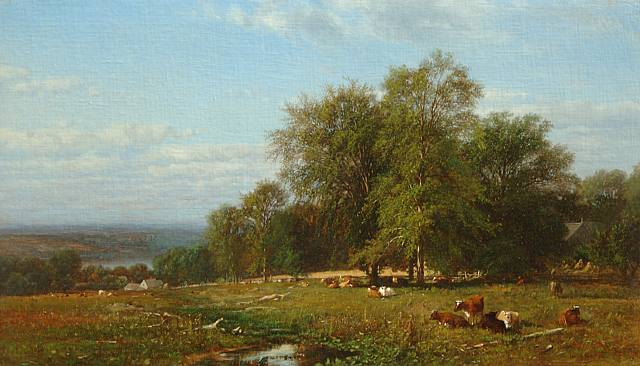
Harriman New York Overlooking the Hudson

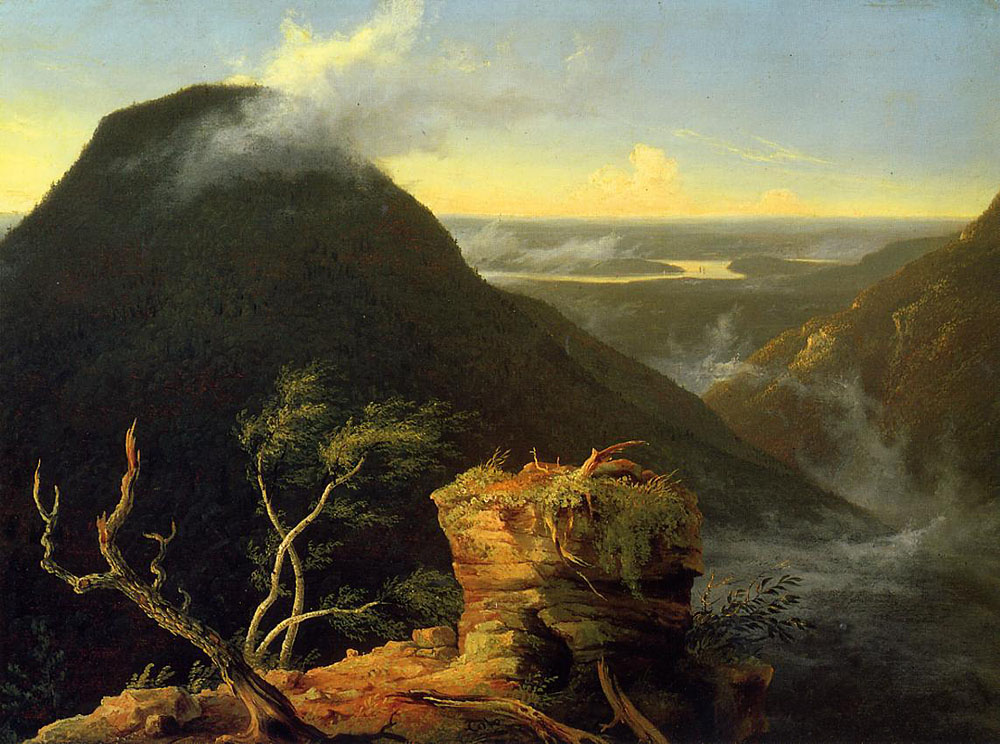
Sunny Morning on the Hudson River

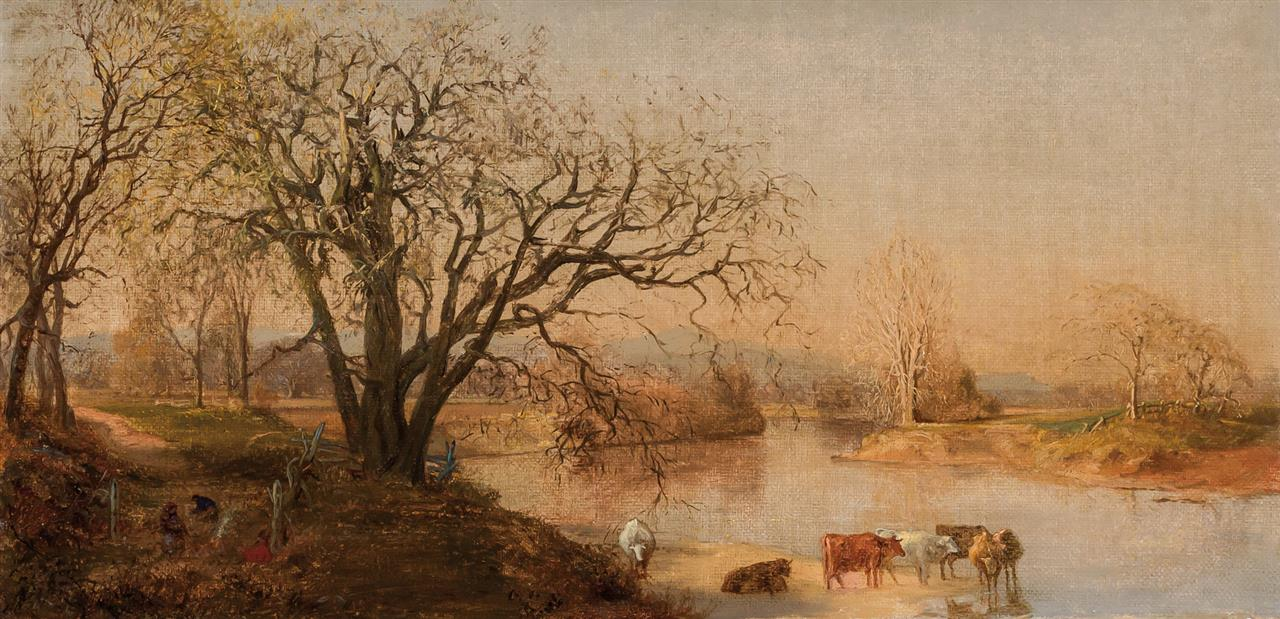
Tomkins Cove

- Victor DeGrailly (1845)
  - Anthonys Nose on Hudson c1845
- George Wesley Bellows (1882–1925)
  - A Morning Snow Hudson River
- Albert Bierstadt (1830–1902)
  - Indian Summer Hudson River
  - Approaching Thunderstorm on the Hudson River
  - Figures in a Hudson River Landscape
- Alfred Thompson Bricher (1837)
  - Along The Hudson
- Sandford Robinson Gifford (1823–1880)
  - Morning in the Hudson, Haverstraw Bay

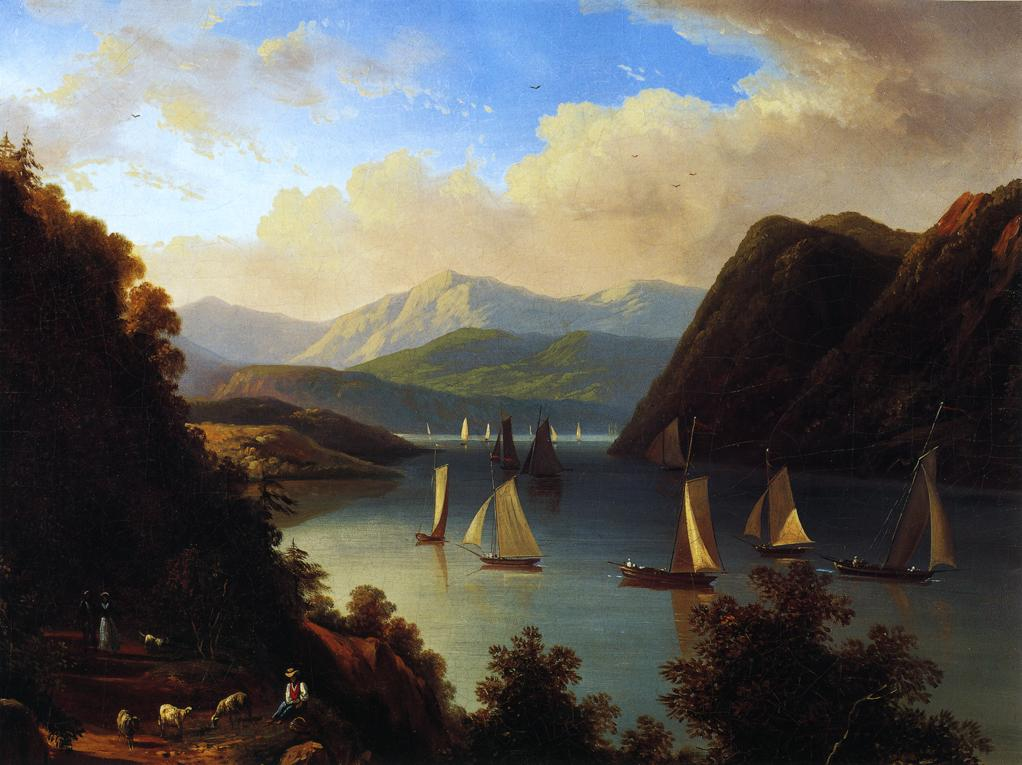
Anthony's Nose on Hudson

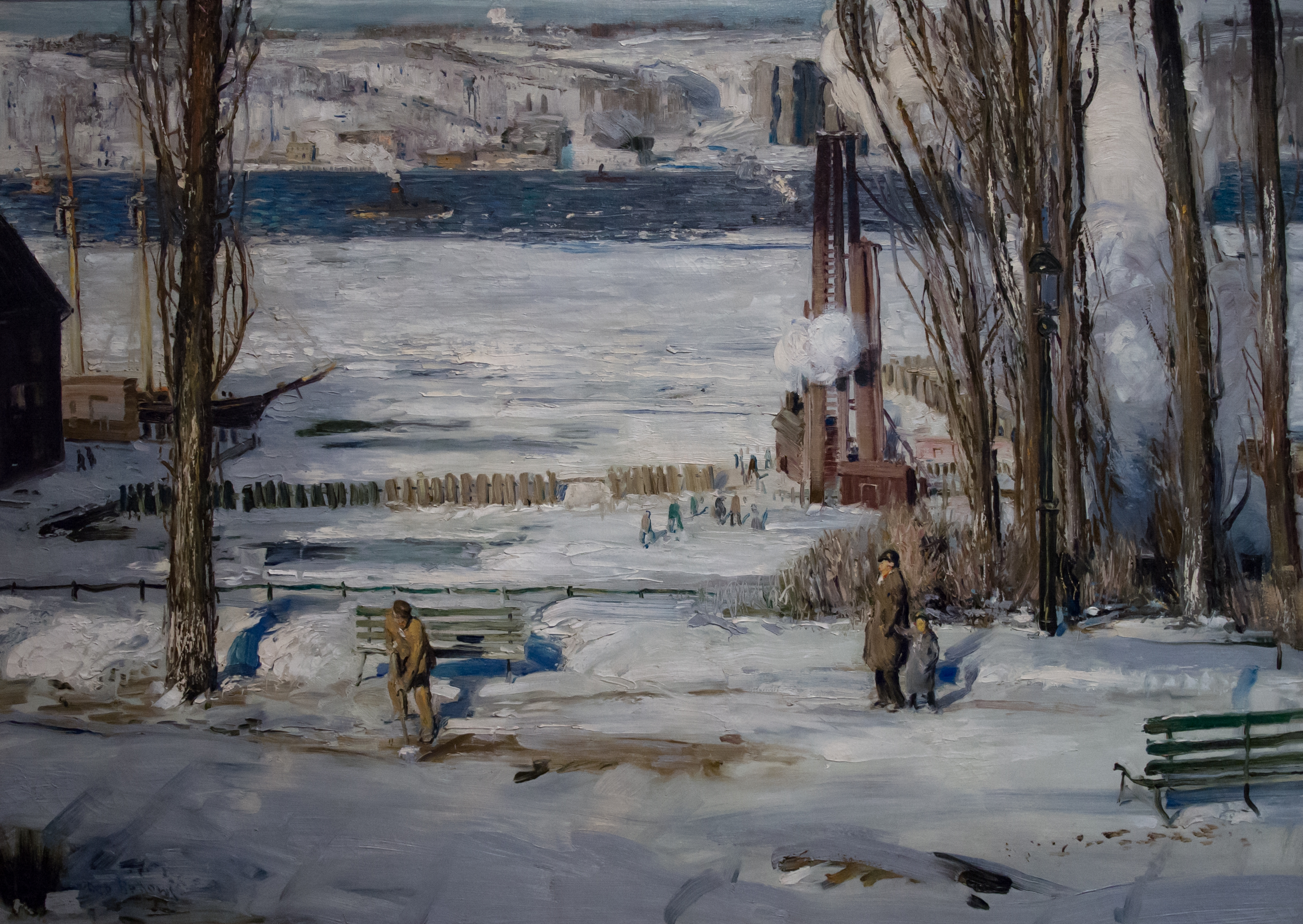
A Morning Snow--Hudson River

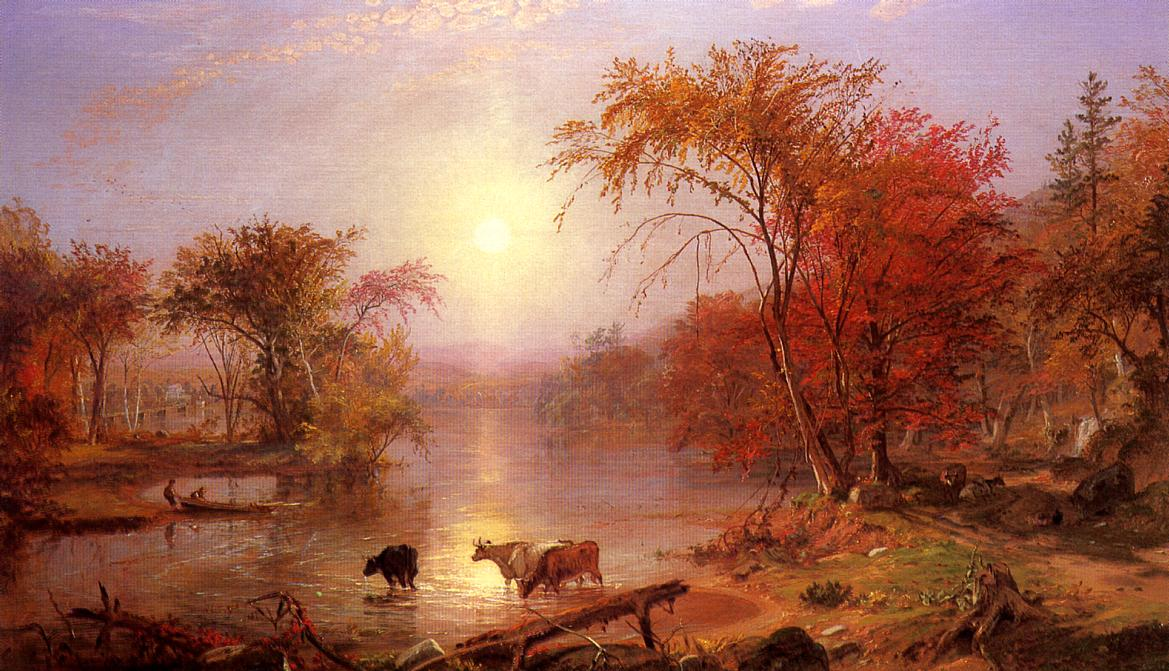
Indian Summer Hudson River

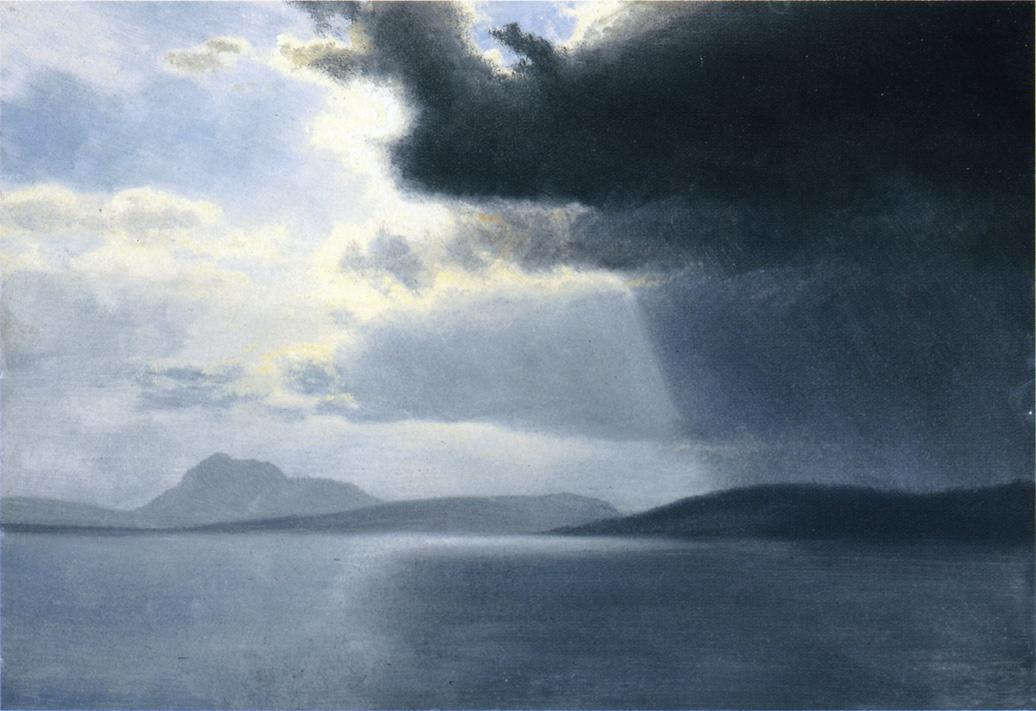
Approaching Thunderstorm on the Hudson River

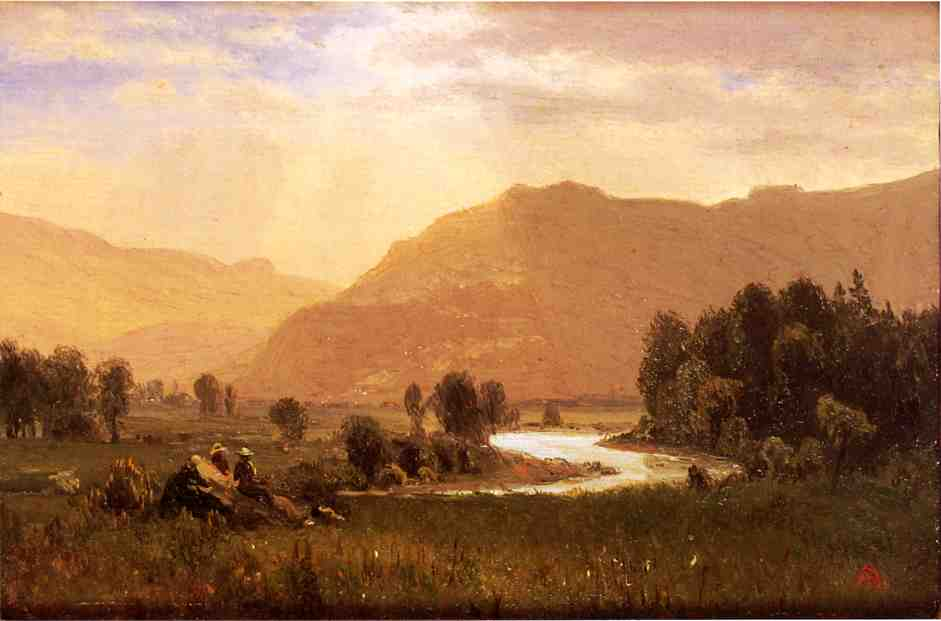
Figures in a Hudson River Landscape

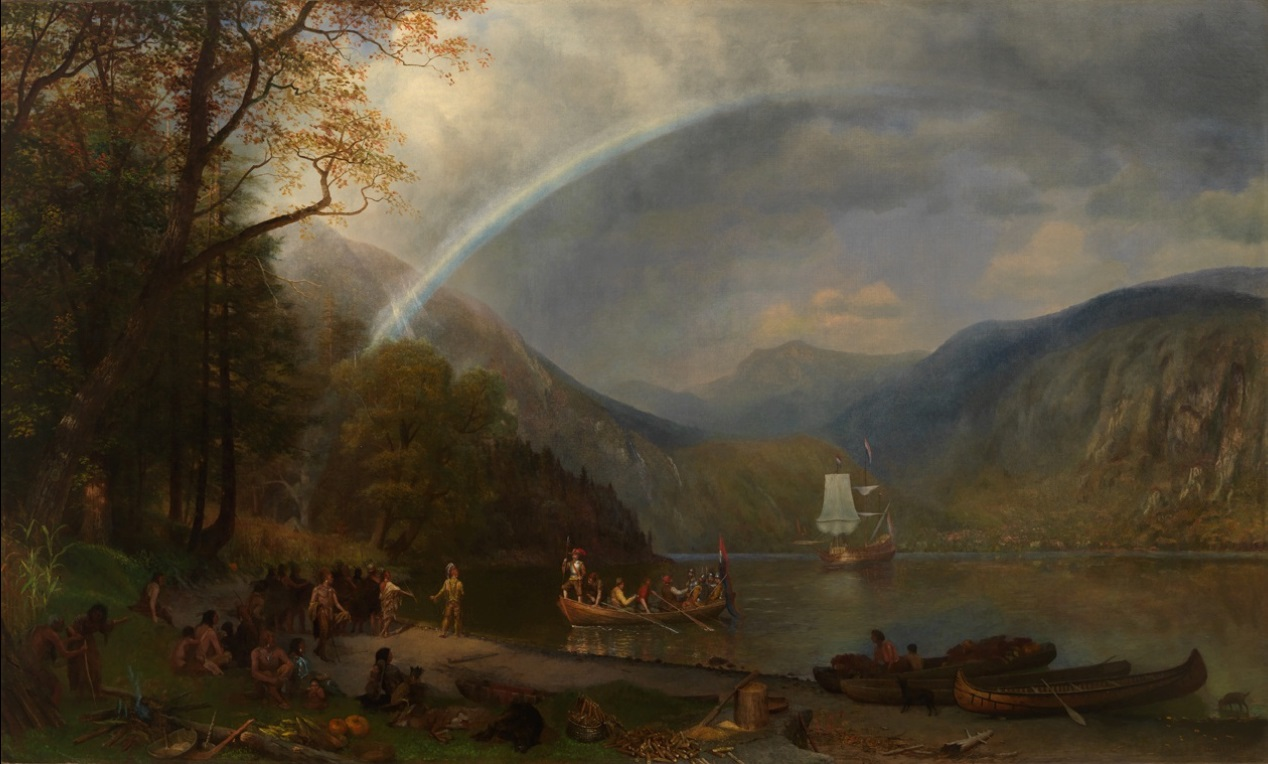
Discovery of the Hudson River

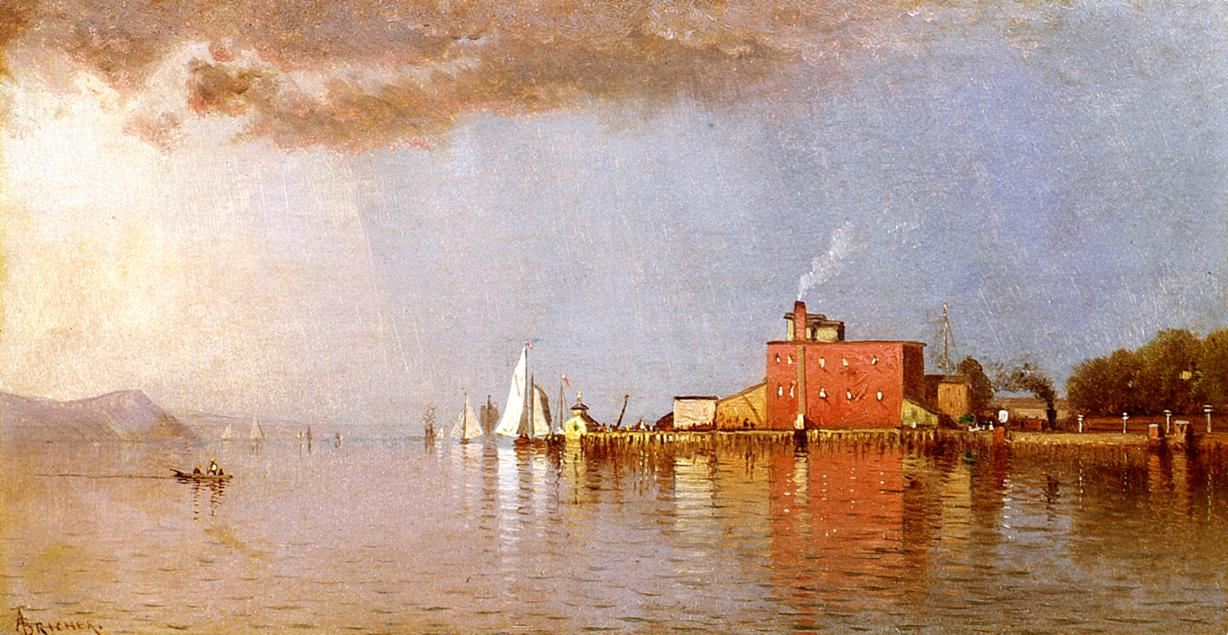
Along The Hudson

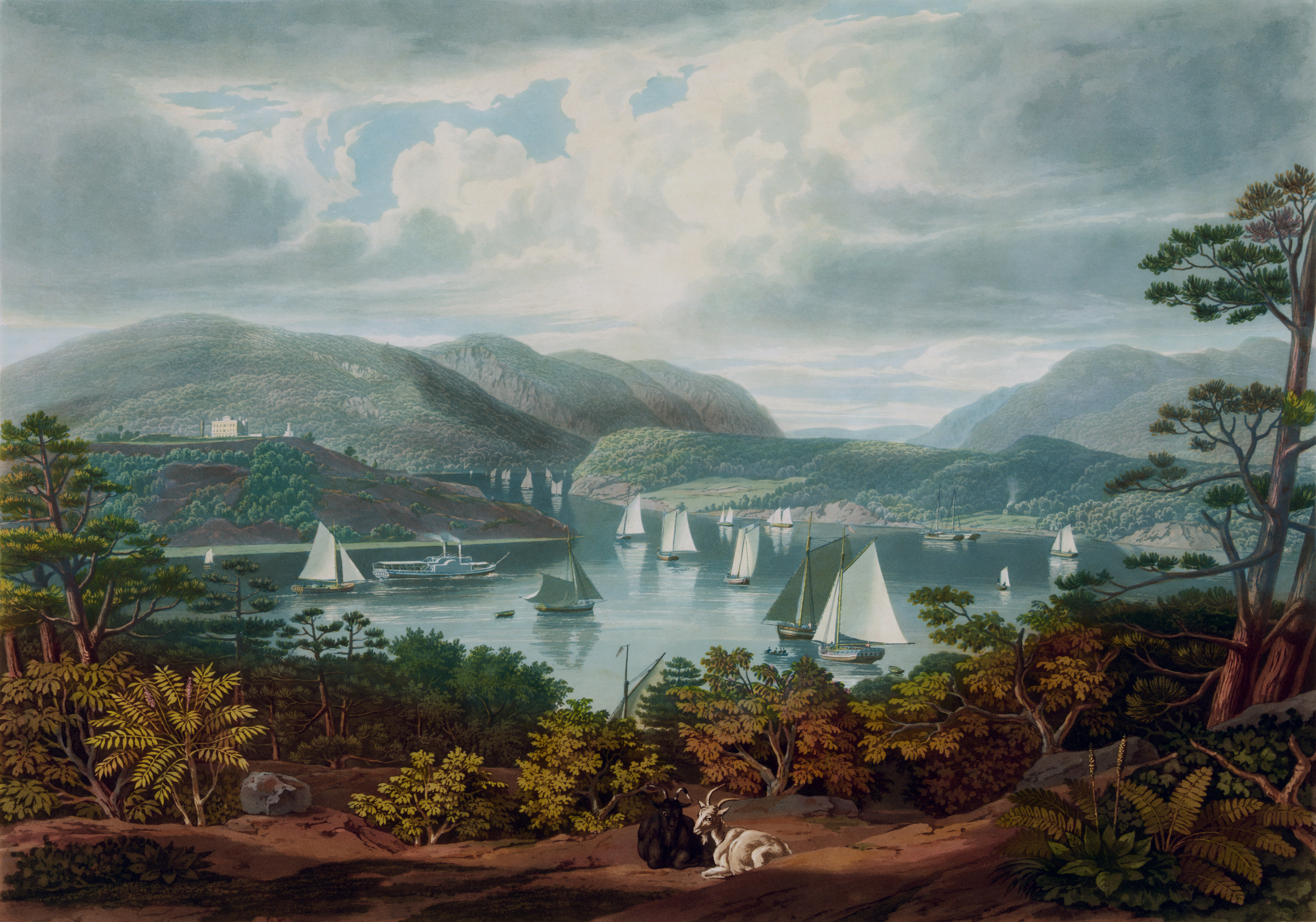
West Point From Phillipstown

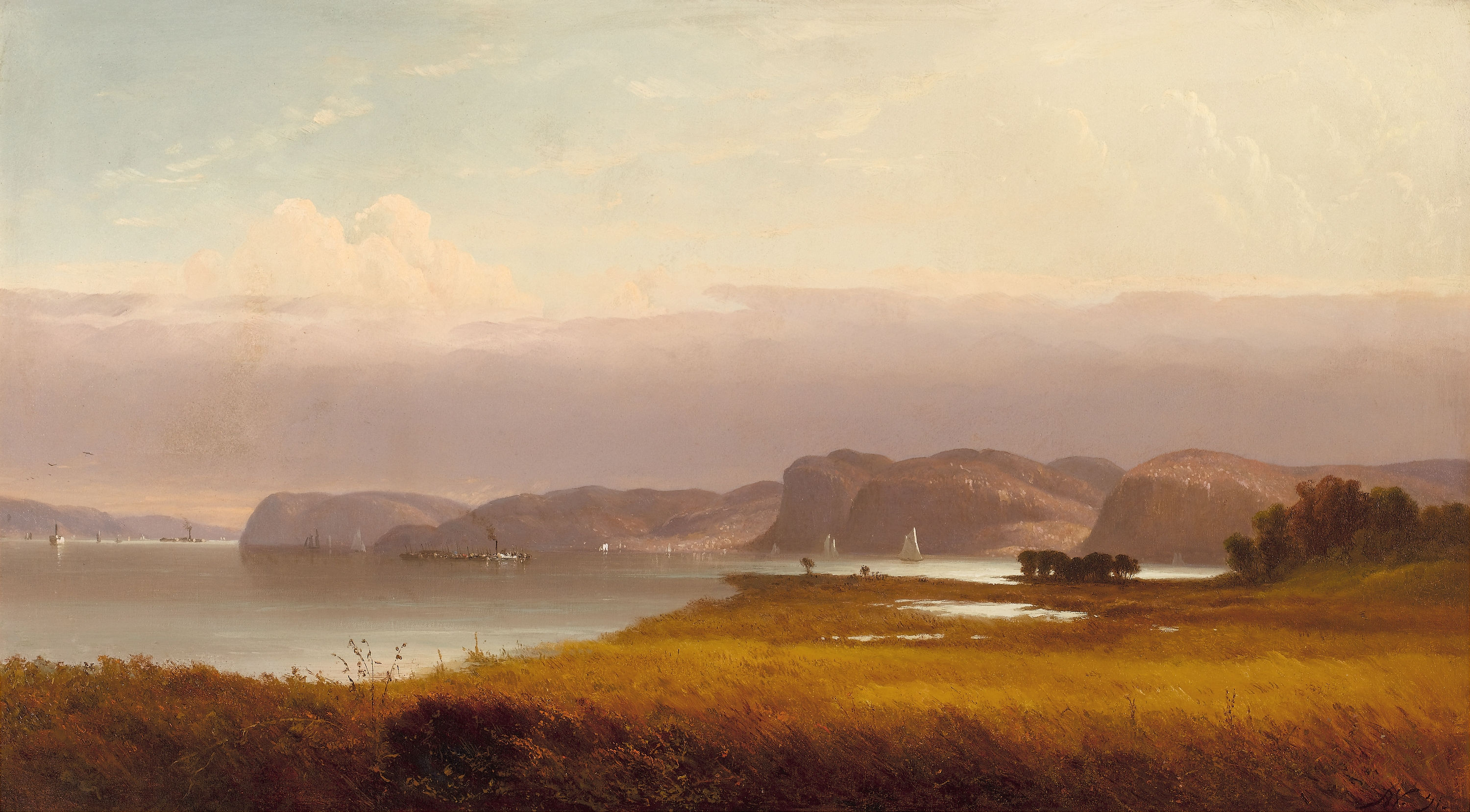
Autumn, Hudson River

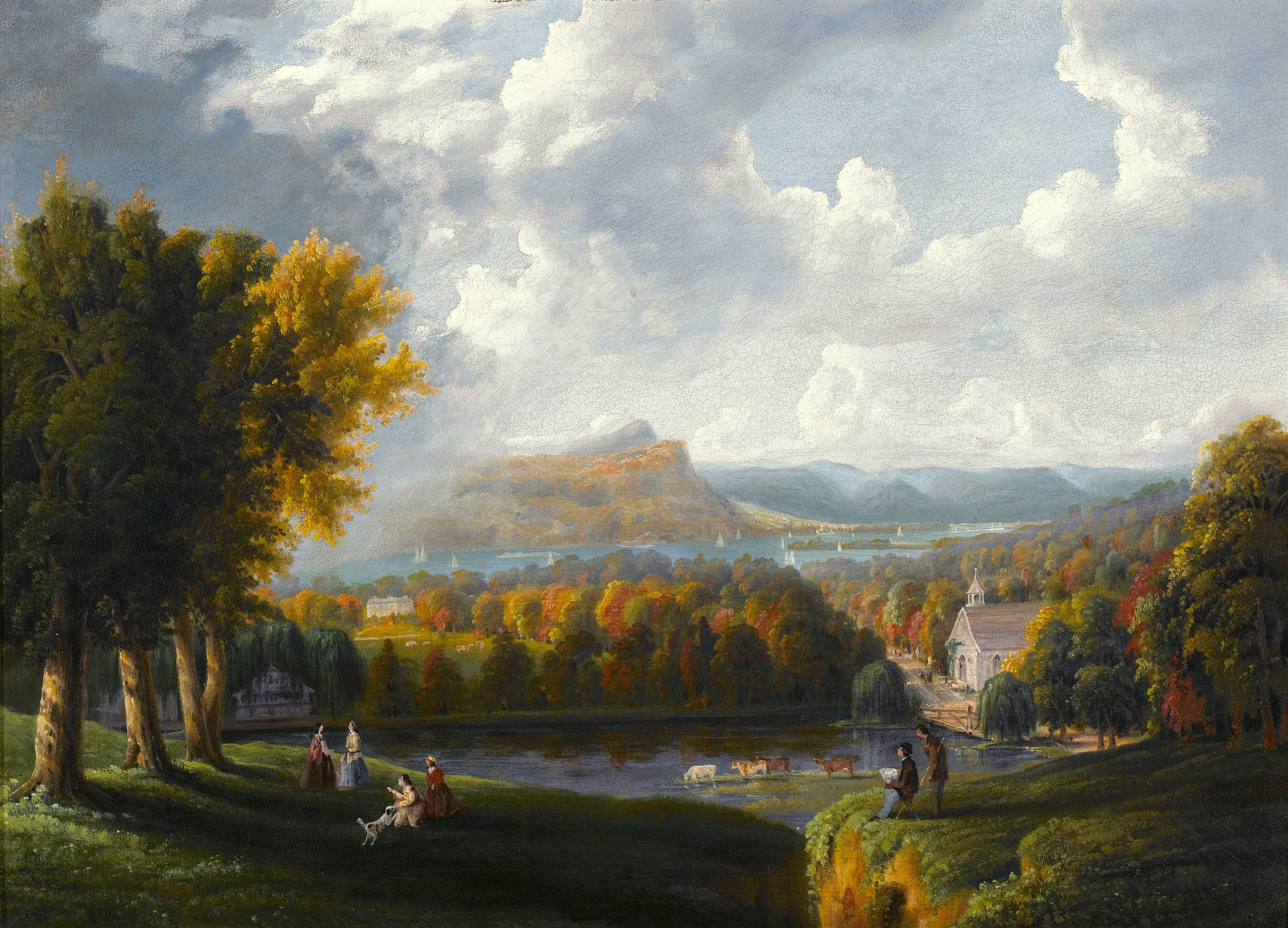
View of the Hudson River from Tarrytown, Old Dutch Church, Beekman Manor House

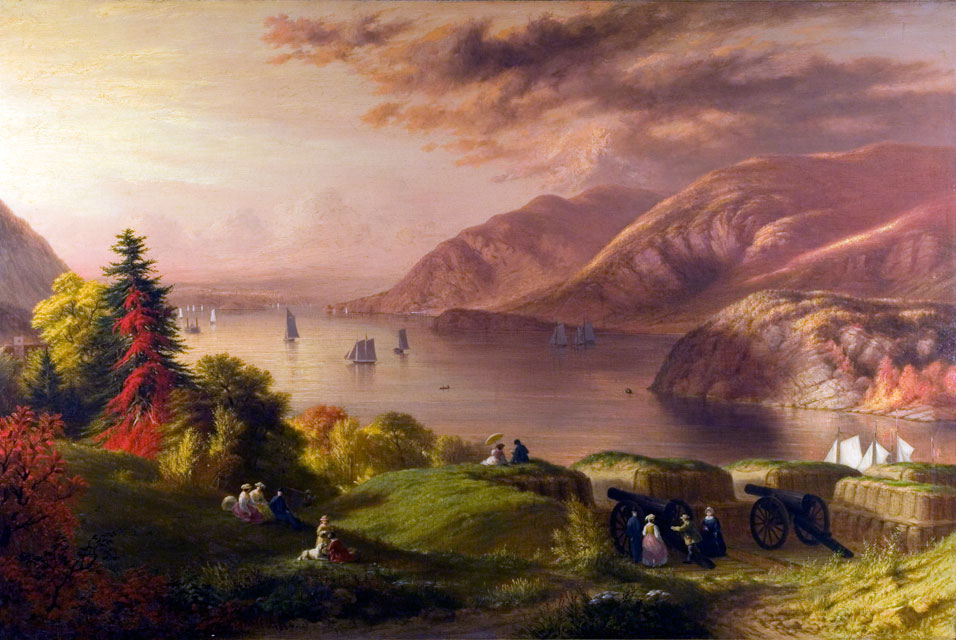
View of the Hudson River by Robert Walter Weir, 1864

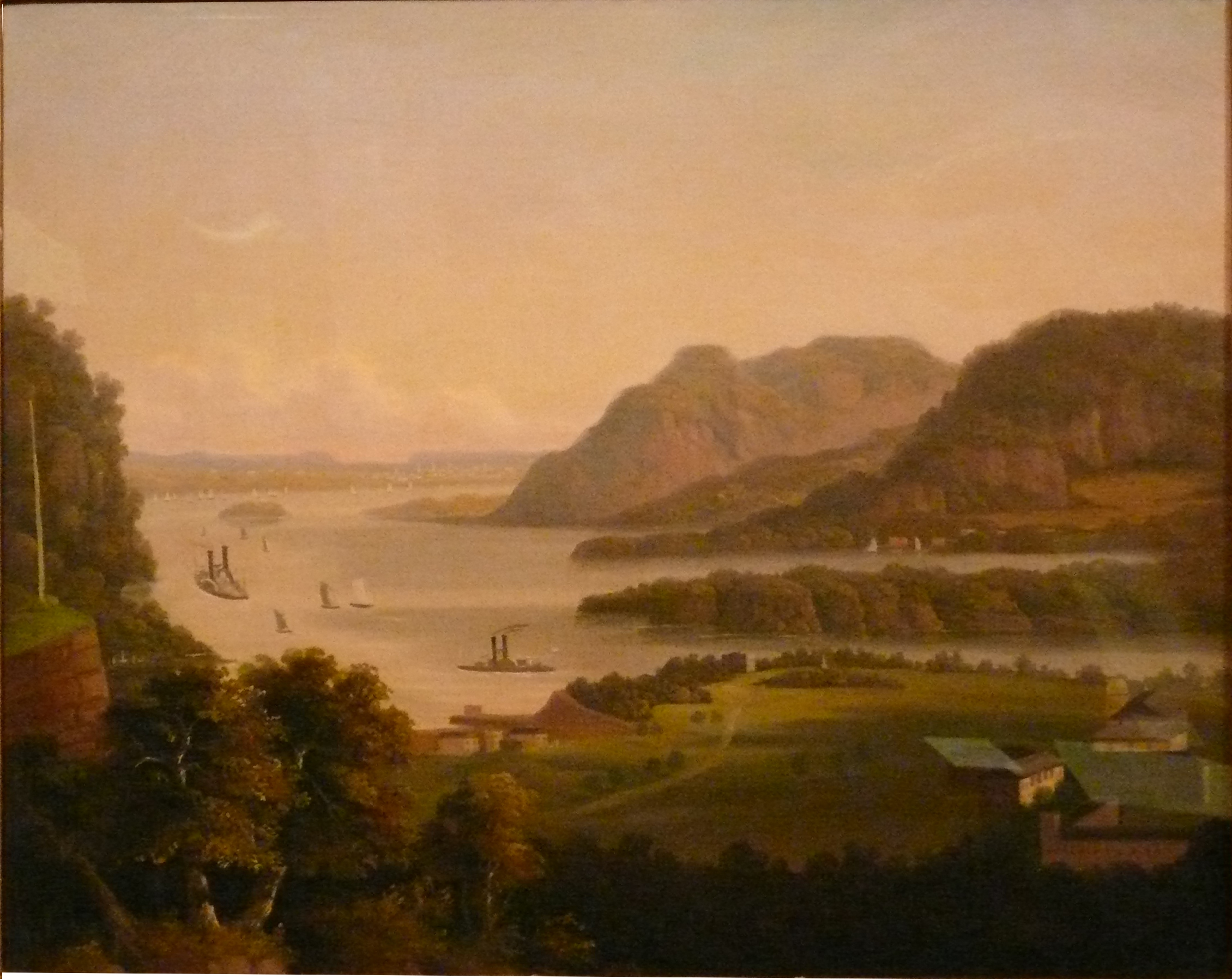
View of West Point from Fort Putnam

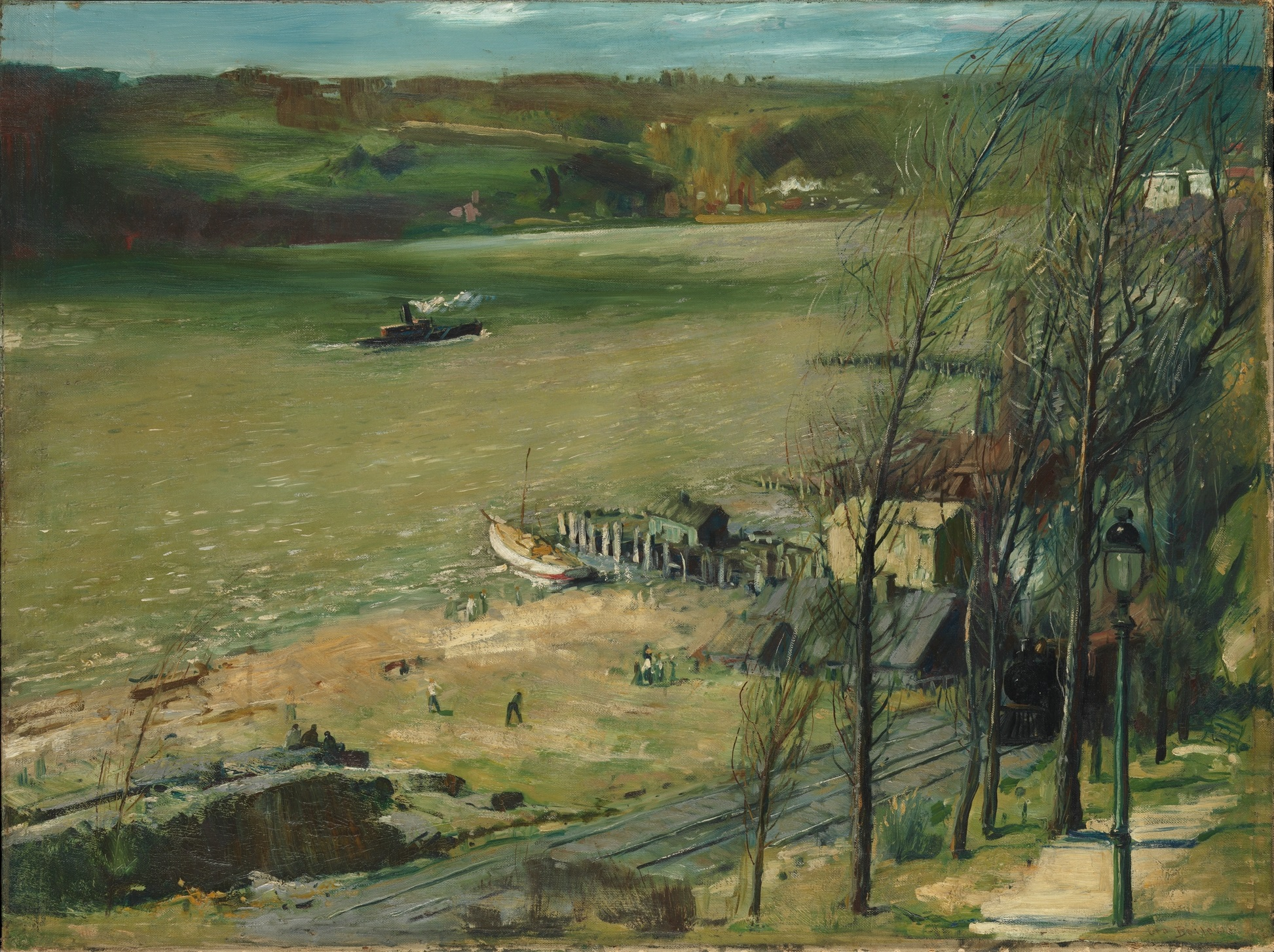
Up the Hudson

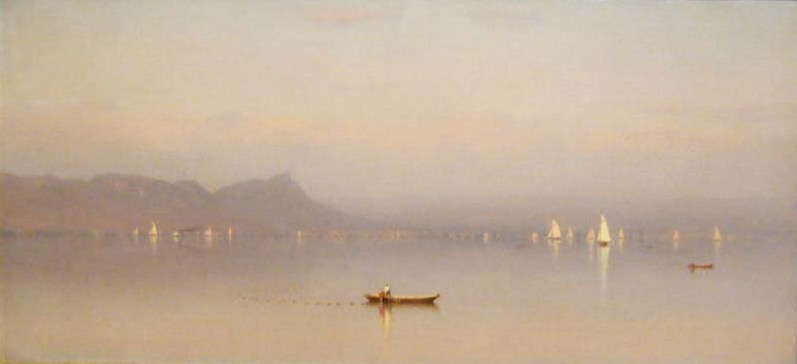
Morning in the Hudson, Haverstraw Bay

== Books and publications ==
- Anderson, Jane McDill., Rocklandia: A collection of facts and fancies, legends and ghost stories of Rockland County life 1977
- Baracks, Clarence., Growing up in New City, New York in the early 1920s
- Bedell, Cornelia F., (Compiled and privately printed) Now and then and long ago in Rockland County Copyright 1968, Historical Society of Rockland County.
- Buckman, David Lear (January 16, 1907). "CHAPTER 1". Old Steamboat Days on The Hudson River. The Grafton Press. Archived from the original on August 26, 2010 – via Hudson River Maritime Museum.

- Buckman, David Lear (January 16, 1907). "Old Steamboat Days on the Hudson River: Tables and Reminiscences of the Stirring Times That Followed the Introduction of Steam Navigation". The Grafton Press – via Internet Archive.
- "Old Steamboat Days on the Hudson River, by David Lear Buckman". The Online Books Page.
- Buckman, David Lear (January 16, 1909). "Old Steamboat Days on the Hudson River: Tables and Reminiscences of the Stirring Times That Followed the Introduction of Steam Navigation". The Grafton Press – via HathiTrust.
- Buckman, David Lear (January 16, 1907). "Old Steamboat Days on the Hudson River: Tables and Reminiscences of the Stirring Times That Followed the Introduction of Steam Navigation". The Grafton Press – via Library of Congress Digital Collections.
- commons:File:Old steamboat days on the Hudson River - tales and reminiscences of the stirring times that followed the introduction of steam navigation (IA oldsteamboatdays01buck).pdf

- Budke, George H., Rockland County during the American Revolution, 1776–1781. New York. The Rockland County Public Librarians Association. 1976
- Cohen, David Steven The Ramapo Mountain People Rutgers University Press 1974
- Cole, David D.D., History of Rockland County: (New York) 1976, Historical Society of Rockland County.
  original 1884 edition
- Gonyea, Maryellen., Stony Point in Words and Pictures, ed. NCL RR 974.728 STO
- Gottlock, Barbara H., Gottlock Wesley., New York's Palisades Interstate Park (NY) (Images of America)
- Green, Frank Bertangue. MD., The History of Rockland County: (New York) 1886, A. S. Barnes.
- Knight, Robert P., Centennial history of Pearl River, New York Pearl River Centennial Committee 1973
- Kuykendall, Eugene L., Historic Sloatsburg, 1738–1998, The Way it Was, Is and Can Be, Sloatsburg Historical Society, 1998.
- Lucanera, Viola M., The role of Orangetown in the Revolution (Rockland County bicentennial publication)
- Penford, Saxby Vouler., The first hundred years of Spring Valley: Written in commemoration of the Spring Valley Centennial, 1842–1942 (Social Science Research Foundation. Publications)
- Penford, Saxby Voulaer., "Romantic Suffern - The History of Suffern, New York, from the Earliest Times to the Incorporation of the Village in 1896", Tallman, N.Y., 1955, (1st Edition)
- Pritchard, Evan T., Native New Yorkers: The Legacy of the Algonquin People of New York. published by Council Oak Books, 2002 ISBN 1-57178-107-2
- Scott, John A Short history of the West Nyack Area The West Nyack free library, June 7, 1970.
- Smeltzer-Stevenot, Marjorie., Footprints in the Ramapos: Life in the Mountains Before the State Parks
- Stalter Elizabeth., Doodletown: Hiking through history in a vanished hamlet on the Hudson
- Talman, Wilfred Blanch., How things began in Rockland and places nearby
- Talman, Wilfred Blanch., Fabend, Firth Haring Ed. Tappan, 300 Years, 1686–1986 Tappantown Historical Society, (1989)
- Watts, Gardner F., A short history of Suffern and the Ramapaugh area: With emphasis on Revolutionary days and ways (Rockland County bicentennial publication) (1972)
- Zimmerman, Linda., Rockland County: Century of History
- Zimmerman, Linda., Rockland County Scrapbook Published by Eagle Press, 2004
- American Revolution Bicentennial Committee of Sloatsburg: Bicentennial History of Sloatsburg, New York 1776–1976,
- America's Bicentennial, 1776–1976, Haverstraw Commemorative Edition. [NCL 974.728 HAV].
- Celebrate Clarkstown 1791–1991. Clarkstown, New York: Clarkstown Bicentennial Commission, 1991.
- The Nyacks Historical Society of the Nyacks and the Nyack Library, Arcadia Publishing of Maine October 2005
- Nyack in the 20th century: A Centennial Journal by the Historical Society of the Nyacks, published in 2000
- Suffern: 200 years, 1773–1973 Bicentennial Committee, Suffern, New York Published in 1973.
- Portrait of West Nyack S-E-A-R-C-H Foundation of West Nyack, N.Y. 10994 LIC 73-83686 Zingaro Printing Corporation – 1973.
