= North Rockland High School =

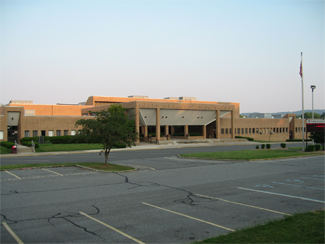

Location
- 106 Hammond Road; Thiells, New York 10984; United States; 41°12′52″N 74°0′57″W

Information
- Other name: NRHS
- School type: Public, High school
- School district: North Rockland Central School District
- CEEB code: 332310
- Principal: Lauren DaPonte
- Teaching staff: 176.49 (FTE))
- Grades: 9–12
- Gender: Co-educational
- Enrollment: 2,683 (2023–2024)
- Student to teacher ratio: 15.20
- Colors: Red white
- Mascot: Black Panther
- Nickname: Red Raiders
- Website: nrhs.northrockland.org

North Rockland High School (NRHS) is public, co-educational high school located in Thiells, New York, serving 9th to 12th grade students from the northern section of Rockland County, in southern New York. The current high school building was constructed on Hammond Road in the 1966-69 timeframe with the first class entering in September 1969. The previous high school was in the village of Haverstraw and was converted to a middle school. The Hammond Road building is the only high school in the North Rockland Central School District.

In 2018, U.S. News & World Report recognized North Rockland High School in its annual national rankings and earned a bronze medal based on their performance on state-required tests and how well they prepare students for college.

During the COVID-19 global pandemic, NRHS was one of the first school districts in the Hudson Valley area to launch an experimental hybrid learning program.

== Administration ==
The principal of NRHS is Mrs. Lauren DaPonte, who was promoted from Vice Principal after the departure of previous principal, Dr. Michael Gill, in 2022. DaPonte became the 5th principal of NRHS in the 2022–23 school year. Past principals were Dr. Michael Gill, Dr. George Jochum, Mr. Israel Bordanick and Mr. Dennis Hand.

== Service area ==
In Rockland County the school district, of which North Rockland High is the sole comprehensive high school, includes all of Stony Point town and a part of Haverstraw town. The district includes the villages Haverstraw and West Haverstraw, and the hamlets of Stony Point and Thiells. The district also includes most of Mount Ivy hamlet and a portion of Pomona village. In Orange County the district includes parts of the towns of Highlands, Tuxedo, and Woodbury.

== Previous schools ==
Students within the school district begin primary school in Stony Point Elementary School, Thiells Elementary School, or West Haverstraw Elementary School, all of which serve grades K–3. Intermediate schoolers attend Haverstraw Elementary School, James A. Farley Elementary School (sometimes shortened as Farley Elementary School), or Willow Grove Elementary School, which serve grades 4-6. These schools combine into Fieldstone Middle School, which serves grades 7 and 8. Students who attended Thiells Elementary school would later attend Willow Grove Elementary School, West Haverstraw elementary school students would later attend Haverstraw Elementary school, And Stony Point Elementary School Students would later attend James A. Farley Elementary school, All of whom would attend Fieldstone Middle school.

In 2012, All of the intermediate schools in the district had their titles changed from having "middle" in them to "upper elementary", and elementary schools to "lower elementary". This change was made to change the title of the school "Fieldstone Secondary School" to "Fieldstone Middle School".

== Campus ==
North Rockland High School is composed of two buildings.

The main building is a one-story building built during the late 1960s, and was designed by Valley Stream, New York-based Frederic P. Wiedersum Associates. The main building consists of the main office, the guidance office, the health office, the main coordinator's office, special education classrooms, a library, the main cafeteria, the main gym, English classrooms, Technology classrooms, Math classrooms, Science classrooms, Foreign Language classrooms, Social Studies classrooms, and Music classrooms.

The Annex was built during the early 1970's as a result of a significant populatiom increase and served as an expansion to North Rockland High School. Composed of three floors, the first floor consists of the athletic office, the Annex office, the Annex coordinator's office, the Annex cafeteria, the Annex gym, and Art classrooms. The second floor comprises the Annex computer lab, Social Studies classrooms, and English classrooms. The third floor consists of Science classrooms and a few Math classrooms. The Annex and main building are connected and students do not have to walk outside to switch buildings. The Annex is primarily utilized by Freshman students, and the Annex cafeteria is freshman-exclusive.

NRHS is one of two fully climate-controlled buildings in the North Rockland Central School District, the other near Fieldstone Middle School.

=== Student publications ===
Students publish works for the school's reading pleasure, including the newspaper, "The Rambling Raider," the magazine, "Reflections," and the yearbook, made by Recensio.

=== Sports ===
Athletics include:

- Football
- Baseball
- Basketball
- Bowling
- Cheerleading
- Crew
- Cross country
- Diving
- Swimming
- Field hockey
- Golf
- Hockey
- Lacrosse
- Skiing
- Soccer
- Softball
- Spring Track
- Swimming
- Tennis
- Volleyball
- Winter Track
- Wrestling

==== Rankings ====
- Boys 2003 & 2004 Swimming & Diving Team Won their County-championships - taking First-place both years consecutively. Consequently, what REALLY solidified that team in History was being the First (NR)Boys HS Swim Team to beat every single other team located within New-York States largest & most competitive Regions; winning the 2003 HS Boy's Section I (AA) Conference Championships.
- Girls Cross Country team won league, county, and section champs in 2010 and was 3rd in the state at the New York State Championships Class AA.
- Cheerleaders were section 1 champs in 2022. The Varsity Cheerleaders also won the NCA National Cheerleading Championship in 2015, 2018 and 2023 in Dallas, Tx.
- Boys bowling team won the Section 1 championship in 2008, 2009 and 2010. In 2010 the team won the New York State Championship.
- Girls bowling team won the Section 1 championship in eight years (2005-2012) and placed second in state in 2007 and third in state for 2009.
- Boys Cross Country team won the school's first New York State Federation Championship in 2009.
- Girls Swimming and Diving team placed number one in Rockland County for two years, 2007 and 2008
- Boys Baseball team won the New York class A state championship in 1992, 1993 and 1994.
- Football team won Section 1 in 2011
- Volleyball team won Section 1, Class A State Championship in 2000 versus Sweet Home HS.
- Varsity Football team won 1st ever NYS Football State Championship (Class A) in 1993.

== Notable alumni ==
- Kelly Brady (footballer), professional soccer player
- Taylor Aylmer, professional soccer player
- Stephanie Courtney, actress(Flo from Progressive)
- JG Faherty (James Gregory Faherty), author
- JP Grayson (Justin Parker DuBoff) - Professional Wrestler
- Tommy Grayson (Spencer Andrew DuBoff) - Professional Wrestler
- Brandon Hepburn, former NFL player
- Richard Humann, neo-conceptual artist
- Euna Kim, rapper and singer
- Derrick Lassic, former NFL player
- Danielle McEwan, professional bowler
- Molly McGee, former NFL player
- Dennis O'Sullivan, former NFL player
- Kelvin Smith, former NFL player
- Scott Stanford, TV/WWE personality
- Katelyn Tuohy, long distance runner and record holder

== Notable faculty ==
- David Bernsley - Israeli Basketball Premier League player
