= Molly McGee =

Molly McGee may refer to:

- Molly McGee (gridiron football) (1952–1994), American gridiron football player
- Molly McGee, a main character of Fibber McGee and Molly, a 1935 American radio comedy series
- Molly McGee, a main character in The Ghost and Molly McGee
