= Brandon Hepburn =

American football player (born 1989)

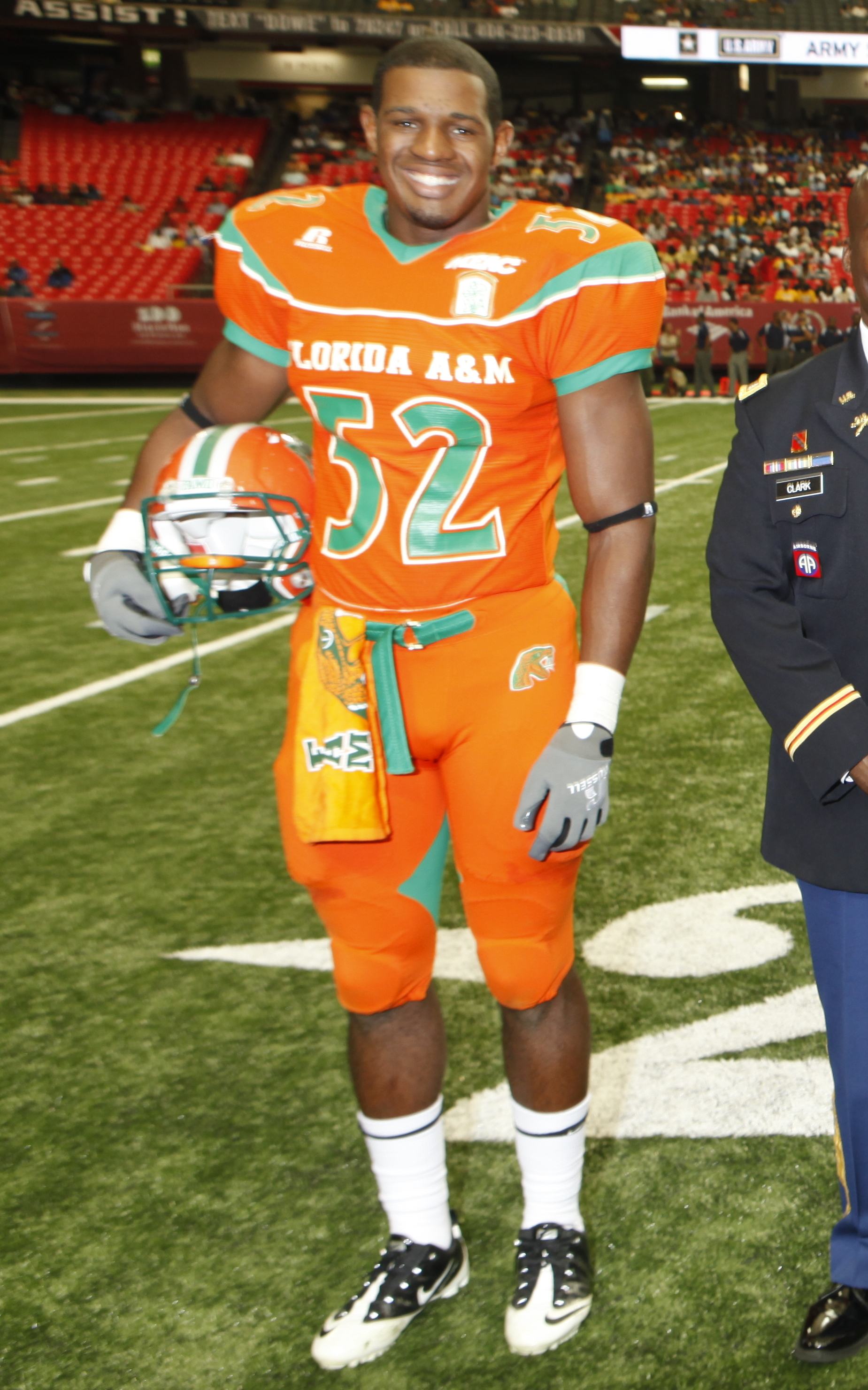
- Hepburn at the 2011 Atlanta Football Classic

No. 48, 51, 57
- Position: Linebacker

Personal information
- Born: December 6, 1989 (age 36); Nyack, New York, U.S.
- Listed height: 6 ft 4 in (1.93 m)
- Listed weight: 225 lb (102 kg)

Career information
- High school: North Rockland (Thiells, New York)
- College: Florida A&M
- NFL draft: 2013: 7th round, 245th overall pick

Career history
- Detroit Lions (2013–2014)*; Philadelphia Eagles (2014−2016)*; Dallas Cowboys (2016)*
- * Offseason or practice squad member only

Awards and highlights
- First-team All-MEAC (2012)
- Stats at Pro Football Reference

Brandon Hepburn (born December 6, 1989) is an American former football linebacker. He played college football for the Florida A&M Rattlers and was selected in the seventh round of the 2013 NFL draft by the Detroit Lions.

== Early life ==
Hepburn attended North Rockland High School in Thiells, New York, where he competing in wrestling and played on the football team. As a junior, he recorded 57 tackles and two sacks as a linebacker and fullback. Hepburn was converted to a defensive tackle ahead of his senior season and recorded 132 tackles, eight sacks and an interception. He aided his team to a NYSPHSAA Class AA West title and earned Journal News first-team all-county honors. Hepburn was also member of the NAACP Youth Council, the National Honor Society, the Science Honor Society and the Key Club, earning the Journal News Scholar-Athlete award as a senior.

== College career ==
Hepburn played college football at Florida A&M, recording 163 tackles, 15 tackles for loss, 7.5 sacks, 11 pass breakups, two forced fumbles, and one fumble recovery in four years. Hepburn redshirted in 2008 as a tight end before later being converted to a linebacker. The following year, he was relegated to special teams duty and had 13 total tackles. In 2010, he played in all 11 games recording 63 tackles, a sack and a forced fumble. In his senior year, he put up 86 tackles (9.5 for loss), 5.5 sacks, 7 passes deflected and a forced fumble and was a first-team All-Mid-Eastern Athletic Conference (MEAC) selection.

== Professional career ==
Pre-draft measurables
Height	Weight	Arm length	Hand span	40-yard dash	20-yard shuttle	Three-cone drill	Vertical jump	Broad jump	Bench press
6 ft 2 in (1.88 m)	240 lb (109 kg)	32 1/2 in (0.83 m)	9 in (0.23 m)	4.68 s	4.55 s	7.40 s	32.0 in (0.81 m)	0 ft 124 in (3.15 m)	21 reps
All values from the NFL Combine

=== Detroit Lions ===
Hepburn was selected by the Detroit Lions in the seventh round (245th overall) of the 2013 NFL draft. On May 8, he signed his rookie contract with Detroit, agreeing to a four-year, $2.21 million deal with a $45,896 signing bonus. Hepburn was waived by the Lions on August 31 as part of final roster cuts. He was signed to the team's practice squad the next day.

Hepburn signed a reserve/future contract with the Lions on January 3, 2014. He was waived on August 30 as part of final roster cuts.

=== Philadelphia Eagles ===
Hepburn was signed to the Philadelphia Eagles practice squad on September 9, 2014, and was released on September 30. He was re-signed to practice squad on October 7. On January 5, 2015, Hepburn signed a future contract. He was waived on August 14 after having suffered an abdominal injury. On August 17, Hepburn was placed on injured reserve. He was waived from injured reserve on August 21. On November 30, 2015, Hepburn was placed on injured reserve.

=== Dallas Cowboys ===
Hepburn signed to the Dallas Cowboys on June 8, 2016. On September 3, 2016, he was released by the Cowboys.

== Personal life ==
Hepburn was born in Nyack, New York, on December 6, 1989, the son of Gregory Hepburn and Adris Swift. His older sister, Yvana, was an All-Big East hurdler at South Florida.

Hepburn credited The Magic School Bus and hands-on science kits with igniting his passion for math and science during his early years. At Florida A&M, he majored in biochemistry and was part of an undergraduate research team investigating cancer treatments using copper. As a senior in 2012, Hepburn and his team presented their findings at an American Chemical Society conference in San Diego. He was motivated by his grandmother, who had died from cancer six years earlier. Hepburn was also the president of the Rattlers Association of Chemists.

As of 2023, Hepburn lived in Baltimore, Maryland.
