= Haverstraw King's Daughters Public Library =

- King's Daughters Public Library
- U.S. National Register of Historic Places
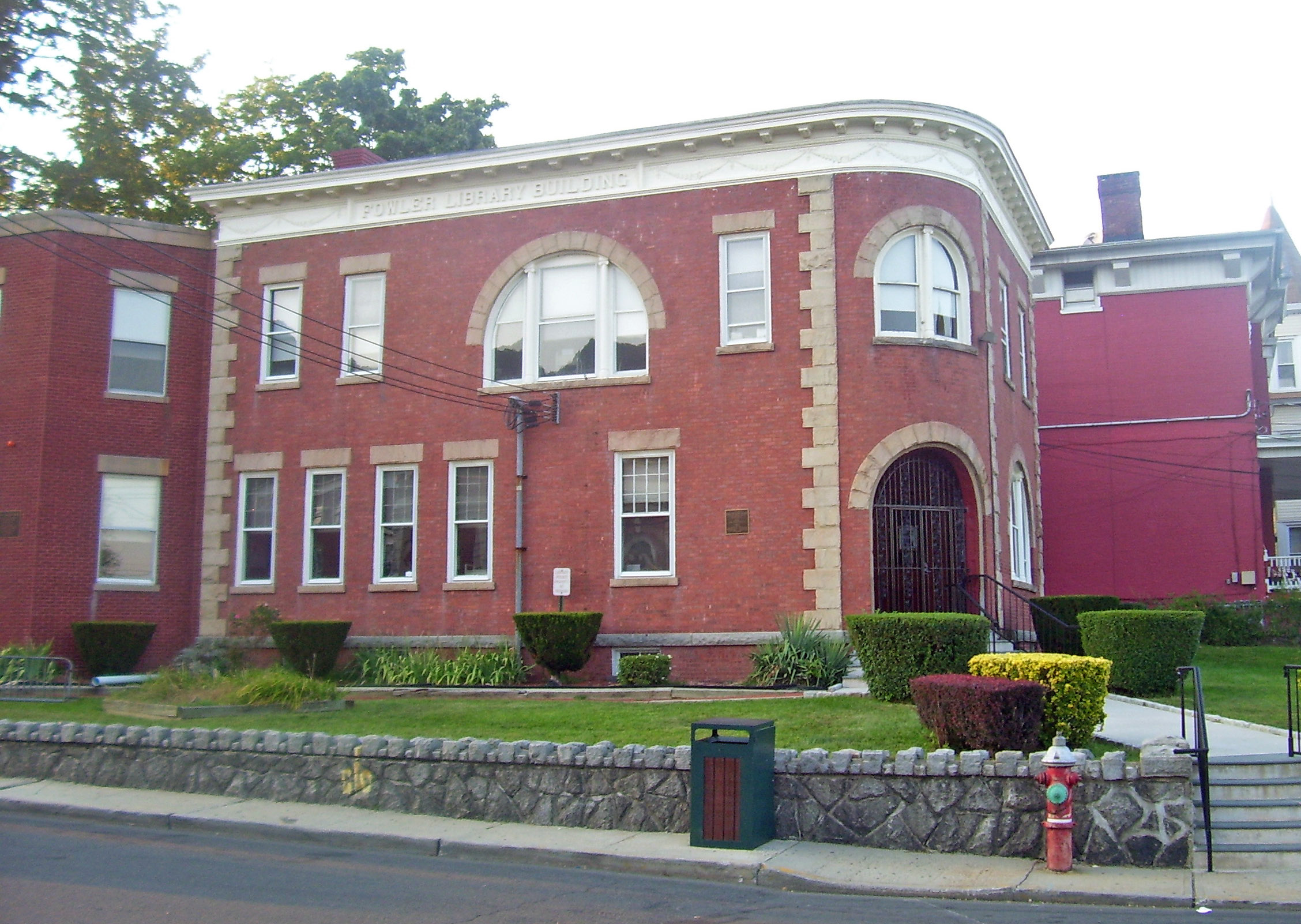
- South elevation and stone wall, 2008
- Location: Haverstraw, NY
- Nearest city: Peekskill
- Coordinates: 41°11′47″N 73°57′38″W
- Area: 0.2 acres (0.081 ha)
- Built: 1903
- Architect: William Parkton
- Architectural style: Renaissance Revival, Classical Revival
- NRHP reference No.: 91000950
- Added to NRHP: August 9, 1991

The Haverstraw King's Daughters Public Library's original home, also known as the Fowler Library Building, is located at Main and Allison streets in the village of Haverstraw, New York, United States. It is a red brick building.

The library itself, established near the end of the 19th century, is the oldest chartered public library in Rockland County. Shortly after its creation, it moved into the building, combining two contemporary revival architectural styles, after money was raised by the local chapter of the King's Daughters, a women's civic organization. A similar wing was built in 1983, and in 1991 it was listed on the National Register of Historic Places.

At the end of the 20th century the library moved into a new main building. The old building's interior was restored in the mid-2000s and continues to serve as a branch.

== Building ==
The library is located on a small lot at the corner, across from the post office. A granite retaining wall, original to the site and thus considered a contributing resource to the Register listing, runs along the south side. The lot slopes gently toward the Hudson River a short distance to the east. The surrounding buildings are mostly residential.

=== Exterior ===
Its main section is a two-story, rectangular structure with a rounded southeast corner, exposed basement and flat roof. The brick is set off by a variety of stone trim: a bluestone water table, sandstone quoins and window trim, and limestone brackets on the overhanging eaves at the roofline. The roof is surfaced in asphalt and pierced by a brick chimney with corbeled cap at the center of the west face.

Below the cornice is a limestone frieze decorated with carvings of garlands tied together in ropes and the letters "FOWLER LIBRARY BUILDING" on the south face. The fenestration includes large arched windows at both reading rooms, the adult room on the east side first story and the children's on the south side of the second story. Another arched window tops the arched main entrance on the corner. All have sandstone voussoirs. The mullions of the reading room windows are Ionic pilasters.

The north facade has similarly asymmetrical fenestration, with a projecting bay. On the west is a sympathetic wing built in 1983 in conformance with National Park Service standards. It is also brick with a flat asphalt roof, and has a simple limestone cornice.

Two wrought iron gates protect the main entrance. Behind them four bluestone steps, matching those at the street corner, lead up to the vestibule and its tiled floor. The sidelighted oak doors lead into an interior vestibule with similar paneling. A bronze dedication plaque commemorates the library's opening on May 14, 1903, and lists the names of its principal donor and the society's board of directors at that time.

=== Interior ===
The interior layout of both stories remains unchanged, as do many of the finishes. Both the adult rooms downstairs and the children's rooms upstairs have fireplaces with galzed brick, marbleized tile floors, carved mantels and beveled mirrors. The central stair has oak wainscoting, ash banisters, and newel posts topped with carved urns. The flooring, moldings and plaster walls are all original, as are the bookshelves and most other furniture.

On the west wall, the original brick and stone window trim is still visible from the new wing side. The original plaster remains on the other side. In the basement, the brick flooring set in dirt is believed to be that of a hotel building on the site before the library was constructed.

== History ==
Haverstraw was incorporated in 1854, and quickly grew due to a successful brick industry that tapped the large clay deposits along the river. In 1891 a group of wives of some of the community's wealthier businessmen organized the Haverstraw Ladies' Home Mission Circle. Originally a sewing circle meant to help the village's less fortunate, it soon saw a need for a wider scope. In 1894 a plan for a larger organization was drawn up, and the next year it formally incorporated as the King's Daughters Society.

That year the president of the society suggested the organization set up a public library, a common charitable goal during the Gay Nineties. The members agreed, and petitioned the New York State Board of Regents for a charter. The request was approved, and Melvil Dewey, then director of the New York State Library, signed the charter, making the new library the oldest chartered public library in Rockland County.

In 1896, the library opened in Jenkins Hall, to the west of the current building. Two years later, it moved to the National Bank Building at Main and Second streets. Soon the library became popular enough that it was apparent a building of its own was necessary. In 1899, local brickmaker Denton Fowler offered to donate $10,000 ($387,000 in contemporary dollars) toward the purchase of land and the construction of a building to be named after him, as long as it was matched.

Nothing happened for three years, as the society was unable to raise additional money. They decided on a smaller building, and two of the members were able to raise the money necessary. Construction began in October 1902, and the library opened seven months later.

William H. Parkton, a local architect who had designed many buildings in downtown Haverstraw, was chosen to design the library. He mixed Classical Revival elements like the wide frieze, quoins and pilasters with Renaissance Revival features like the round-arched windows, detailed cornice and rusticated stonework.

In 1956 a fire badly damaged the upper floor. The building was repaired, but its entire collection was lost.

The area grew, and in 1978 the Thiells branch was opened in a storefront on US 202 further inland to serve patrons in the other areas of the Town of Haverstraw. That same year the state granted the library a new charter as a special library district, giving residents the right to vote on budgets and elect trustees to the board. The Thiells branch soon moved to the basement of Town Hall.

In 1983, a combination of state and federal funding helped the library expand the Fowler Building with the west wing. Named after Kay Freeman, the director of the library for 21 years, a condition of the federal contribution was that the wing be architecturally sympathetic with the existing building. The original building's exterior was also restored during construction, and a wheelchair ramp added.

Three years later, the library began looking for land for new facilities, a process that would take it most of the next decade. During the time, the original building was listed on the Register and, in 1993, received an award from the county historical society for continuing use.

In 2001 the Town Board approved a subdivision on Rosman Road that would allow the library to build a new main branch at Garnerville. Ground was broken later that year and it opened in 2003. Three years later, the library board closed the Fowler building to restore its interior. It reopened in 2007.

== See also ==
- National Register of Historic Places listings in Rockland County, New York
