= United States Post Office (Haverstraw, New York) =

- U.S. Post Office
- U.S. National Register of Historic Places
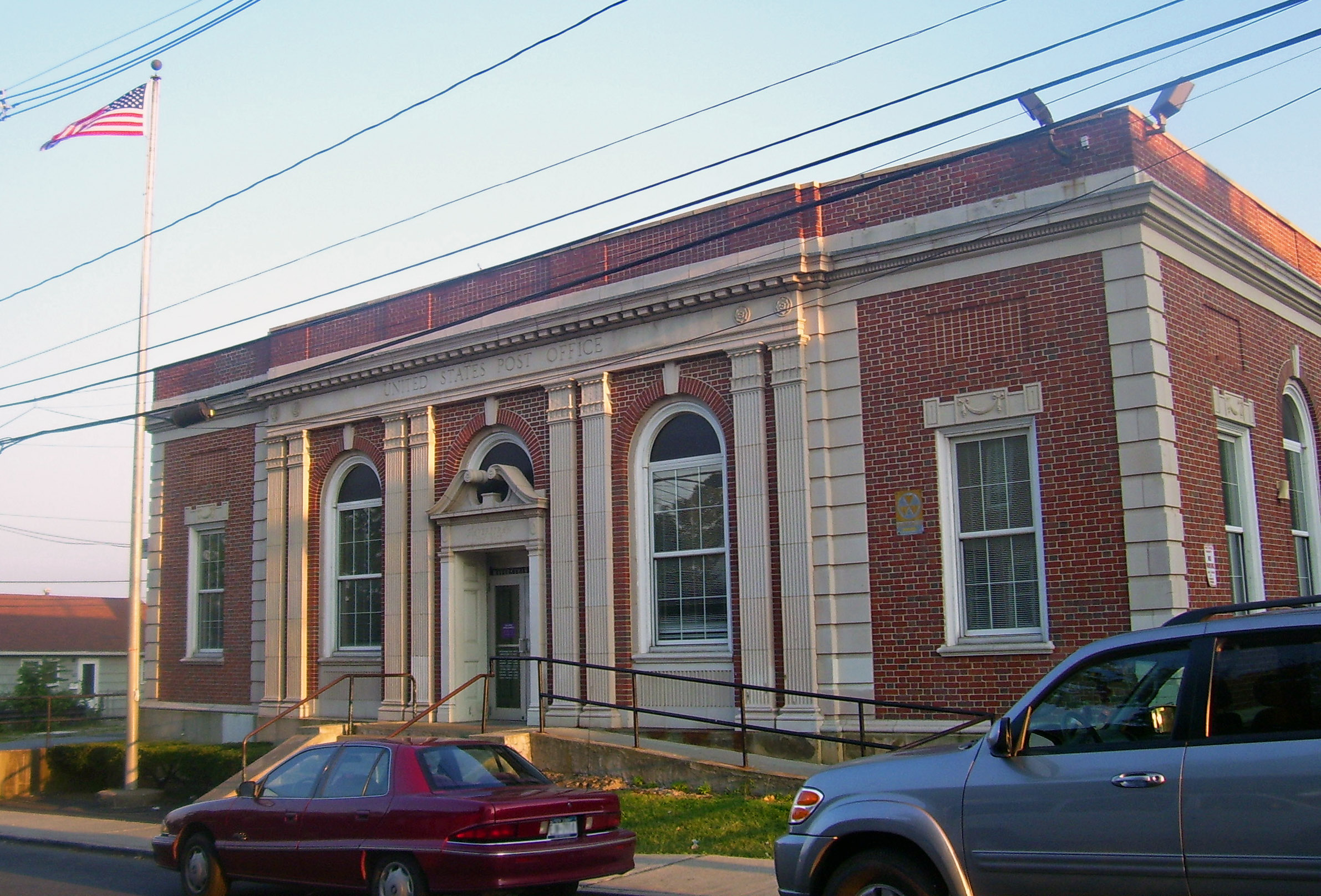
- North elevation and west profile, 2008

- Location within New York Location within the United States
- Location: Haverstraw, NY
- Nearest city: Peekskill
- Coordinates: 41°11′46″N 73°57′38″W
- Area: less than one acre
- Built: 1936
- Architect: Louis Simon
- Architectural style: Colonial Revival
- MPS: US Post Offices in New York State, 1858-1943, TR
- NRHP reference No.: 88002497
- Added to NRHP: November 17, 1988

The U.S. Post Office in Haverstraw, New York, is located on Main Street in the center of the village. It serves the ZIP Code 10927, which covers the village.

It was built in the mid-1930s as a New Deal project. Like many other post offices from that era, it is a brick building in the Colonial Revival architectural style. It features a high level of ornamentation, possibly due to the influence of James Farley, a native of the Haverstraw area who was Postmaster General at that time. In 1988 it was listed on the National Register of Historic Places.

== Building ==
The post office is located on the south side of Main between Front and South streets, across from the Haverstraw King's Daughters Public Library. To the east the land slopes gently down through a park to the Hudson River a short distance away. Houses are located to the west and south.

Its square main block is a one-story, five-bay structure of brick in Flemish bond with an east wing and a slightly projecting pavilion on the north (front) elevation. The flat roof is topped with a cornice and parapet.

Fenestration on the front pavilion consists of three round-arched openings. All are flanked by limestone Greek Revival-inspired Corinthian pilasters with a similar keystone in the arch. Above the pilasters on the facade is a frieze with rosettes at the ends and "UNITED STATES POST OFFICE" in carved lettering.

The windows at the sides of the pavilion have a Federal style carved garland lintel, recessed panel above and rusticated piers on the sides. The south and west facades follow a similar pattern. On the east is a wing with a loading dock.

Granite steps and a wheelchair ramp lead up to the main entrance, modern aluminum doors between two Doric pilasters supporting an entablature with swan's-neck pediment. It leads into a wooden vestibule with carved rosettes and triglyphs, which opens onto the main lobby. There, terrazzo flooring is complemented by panelled wainscoting and plaster walls, ceiling and Gothic cornice. The door to the postmaster's office is framed with carved rosettes, sheaves of wheat and dentils.

== History ==
Haverstraw's first post office, also the first in Rockland County, was established in 1815. A post office was located on the present site from the 1880s to 1915, and afterwards in a leased location on New Main Street.

In 1931 the construction of a new post office in Haverstraw was authorized when Congress passed an amended version of the Public Buildings Act of 1926, in an early attempt to ease the Great Depression. Construction did not begin until 1935, when James Farley, then Postmaster General, a native of nearby Stony Point, laid the cornerstone.

Farley's influence may not only have secured funding for the building, it may have affected the design. Most new post offices of the era were also brick Colonial Revival structures, designs often reused in different locations. Haverstraw's, designed by Treasury Department Supervising Architect Louis Simon, shares a similar basic form with the Norwich post office upstate, built two years earlier. Few have the intricate ornamentation of Haverstraw's, with liberal use of limestone and terra cotta.

Since its construction there have been some alterations. A balustrade on the roof was removed. All the front window sash save for the window above the main entrance has been replaced, and the loading area was moved from the south to the east. New lockboxes and lighting have also been installed in the lobby.

== See also ==
- National Register of Historic Places listings in Rockland County, New York
