= North Rockland Central School District =

School district in the U.S. state of New York

Address
- 65 Chapel Street Garnerville, New York, 10923; United States

District information
- Type: Public
- Grades: K–12
- NCES District ID: 3614010

Students and staff
- Students: 7,910 (2020–2021)
- Teachers: 541.14 (on an FTE basis)
- Staff: 596.36 (on an FTE basis)
- Student–teacher ratio: 14.62:1

Other information
- Website: www.northrockland.org

The North Rockland Central School District is a public school district that serves northern Rockland County, New York, as well as a part of Orange County. It consists of about 7,000 students in 8 schools in grades K–12. The current district Superintendent is Dr. Kris F. Felicello.

In Rockland County the district includes all of Stony Point and Haverstraw. The district includes the villages of Haverstraw and West Haverstraw, and the hamlets of Stony Point and Thiells. The district also includes most of Mount Ivy hamlet and a portion of Pomona village. In Orange County the district includes parts of the towns of Highlands, Tuxedo, and Woodbury.

== Schools ==
=== Elementary ===
- Stony Point Elementary School
- Thiells Elementary School
- West Haverstraw Elementary School

==== Intermediate ====
- James A. Farley Elementary School
- Willow Grove Elementary School
- Haverstraw Elementary School

==== Former ====
- Gerald F. Neary Elementary School
- North Garnerville Elementary School
- Rockland Learning Center

=== Middle school ===
- Fieldstone Middle School (Fieldstone Secondary School from 2004-2012)

=== Senior high ===
- North Rockland High School
