= The Homestead (Haverstraw, New York) =

Historic house in New York, United States

- U.S. National Register of Historic Places
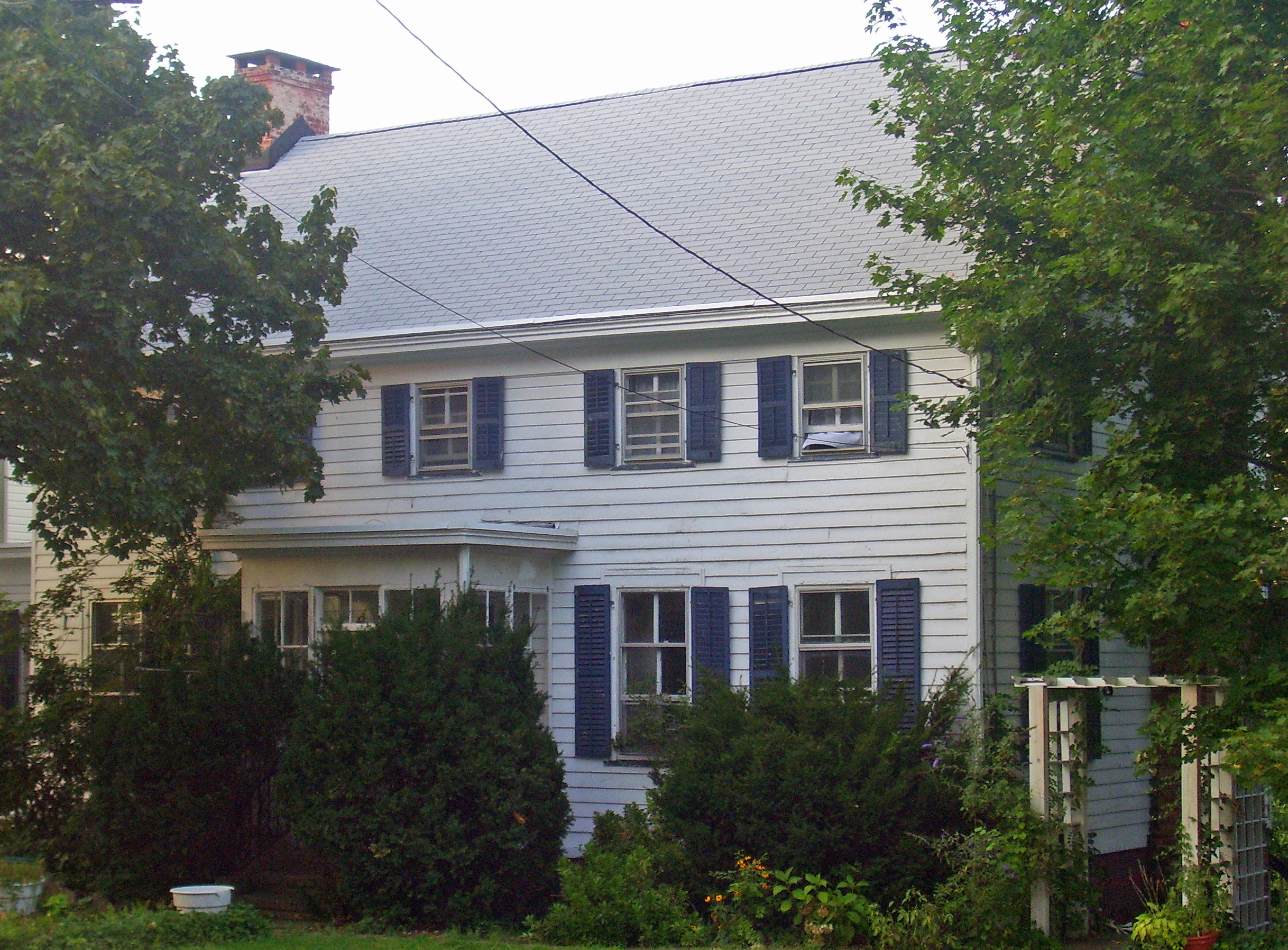
- West elevation, 2008

- Location within New York Location within the United States
- Location: Haverstraw, New York
- Nearest city: Peekskill
- Coordinates: 41°11′35″N 73°57′54″W
- Built: ca. 1800
- NRHP reference No.: 83004154
- Added to NRHP: 1983

The Homestead is a historic house on Hudson Avenue in the village of Haverstraw, New York, United States. It is one of the oldest buildings in the village, dating to the early 19th century.

Since then it has been home to a number of prominent local residents, and passed down through two different families. It has been altered slightly, with the original front now the house's rear, but it remains mostly intact. In 1983 it was listed on the National Register of Historic Places.

== Building ==
The house sits on a 135-by-155-foot (41 by 47 m) lot on the east side of Hudson Avenue near the junction with Tor Avenue. The ground slopes steadily down toward the Hudson River to the east, exposing the house's basement on that elevation. The neighborhood is residential, with a few multiple-unit dwellings.

It is a two-story, five-by-two-bay frame structure sided in clapboard. It is topped by a gabled roof shingled in asphalt with a plain cornice. A small kitchen wing extends from the east.

All the windows are flanked by louvered shutters. The main entrance is located within a small enclosed porch. Its double inner doors have rose-tinted glass. On the east is a two-story, three-bay open porch with square posts, brackets and a central gable on the roof top. At basement level is a door with sidelights and transom; the first floor's double door has colonnettes and an architrave.

Inside, the floor plan remains unchanged. Finishings are plain and simple with the exception of the main hall and large first floor rooms, which have classically inspired decoration.

== History ==
At the time of the Revolution, most of today's Haverstraw was the property of two farmers. One of them, John Denoyelles, had left his lands to his son Peter just before the war. Peter Denoyelles, later to serve in the New York State Assembly and Congress, built the house around the beginning of the 19th century; the exact year is not certain. The area's first Methodists also met with itinerant preachers at the Homestead, due to Denoyelles' interest in that denomination.

Peter left the property to his brother Asbury, then the county sheriff, in his will. Asbury sold the property to his brother George in 1853, the year before the village of Haverstraw incorporated. Shortly after that, George sold it to Edward Pye, first president of the Village Board. Pye would later be elected to local judgeships and serve in the state militia. In 1861, as the Civil War was beginning, Pye (who would later die in action at the Battle of Cold Harbor) sold it to his brother Isaac.

Isaac's tenure as owner would be as short as several of the others. He sold it in 1863 to a lawyer, Abraham Conger. Seven years later, George Snedeker bought it. He died in 1873 and willed the house to his wife, who remained until her death in 1901. Their son Samuel inherited the house, passing it to his sister Lucretia Fowler in 1914. She sold it a year later to a woman named Abbie Kennedy, who was the step-grandmother of Eugene Newman. 18-year-old Eugene was the victim in the infamous 1914 Cleary/Newman murder.

Kennedy lived in the house until selling it to Aloysius Lynch, a longtime Haverstraw schools superintendent, in 1937. He made many overdue repairs and renovations to the house, and shortened the windows on the east and west sides. As the area grew more suburban in the 20th century, streets were laid out in what had been farmland. Hudson Avenue was located such that the house's rear elevation had to be converted into its front.

== See also ==
- National Register of Historic Places listings in Rockland County, New York
