= Molly McGee (gridiron football) =

American gridiron football player (1952–1994)

No. 31, 27
- Position: Running back

Personal information
- Born: August 26, 1952; Haverstraw, New York, U.S.
- Died: July 18, 1994 (aged 41)
- Listed height: 5 ft 10 in (1.78 m)
- Listed weight: 184 lb (83 kg)

Career information
- High school: North Rockland (Thiells, New York)
- College: Rhode Island
- NFL draft: 1974: 16th round, 408th overall pick

Career history
- Atlanta Falcons (1974–1975); Charlotte Hornets (1975); Ottawa Rough Riders (1975–1976); Saskatchewan Roughriders (1976–1979)

Awards and highlights
- Grey Cup champion (1976); CFL receptions leader (1977)
- Stats at Pro Football Reference

Sylvester "Molly" McGee (August 26, 1952 – July 18, 1994) was an American professional football running back who played one season with the Atlanta Falcons of the National Football League (NFL). He was selected by the Falcons in the 16th round of the 1974 NFL draft after playing college football at the University of Rhode Island. McGee was also a member of the Charlotte Hornets, Ottawa Rough Riders and Saskatchewan Roughriders.

== Early life ==
McGee played starred in high school football and baseball at North Rockland High School in Thiells, New York. He was a three-time All-County center fielder in baseball and made the Daily News All-Star team his junior year. He was a two-time All-Rockland running back, a Daily News All-Star and second-team All-New York State in football. McGee graduated from North Rockland High School in 1970 and was inducted into the Rockland County Sports Hall of Fame in 1986.

== College career ==
McGee played for the Rhode Island Rams on an athletic scholarship. He was a three-time, first-team All-Yankee Conference running back and a first-team All-East tailback in 1972. He was voted to the University of Rhode Island team of the decade in 1980.

== Professional career ==
McGee was selected 408th overall by the Atlanta Falcons in the 16th round of the 1974 NFL draft. He played in 10 games for the Falcons in 1974. He was released by the Falcons in 1975 after he suffered a shoulder injury. McGee played for the Charlotte Hornets of the World Football League in 1975 before the league folded midseason. He played for the Ottawa Rough Riders of the Canadian Football League from 1975 to 1976, when he was traded to the Saskatchewan Roughriders. He was the CFL’s leading receiver in 1978 with 68 receptions. A serious knee injury during the 1980 season ended McGee's pro career.
