= Haverstraw (village), New York =

Haverstraw, New York
- Village
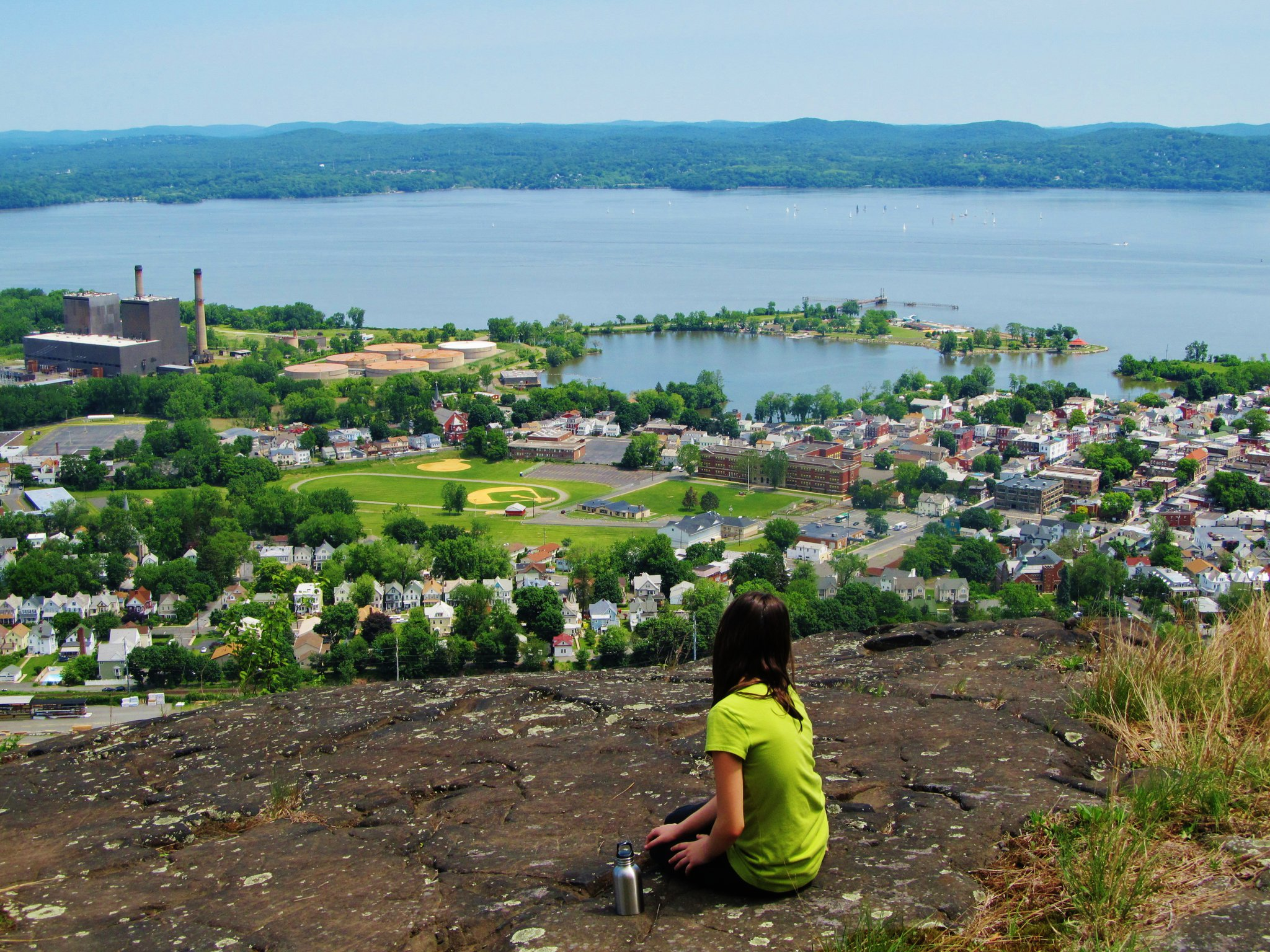
- Village of Haverstraw from atop High Tor Mountain

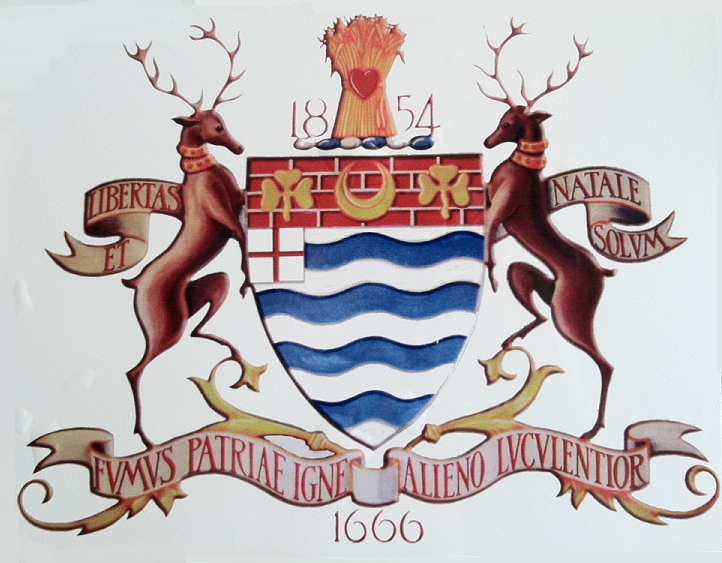
- Coat of arms
- Nicknames: Bricktown, The Ville, Havi
- Motto: Et Libertas Natale Solum Fumus Patriae Igne Alieno Luculentior
- Location in Rockland County and the state of New York.

- Location within the state of New York
- Coordinates: 41°11′47″N 73°58′1″W
- Country: United States
- State: New York
- County: Rockland
- Town: Haverstraw
- Incorporated: 1854

Government
  - Mayor: Michael Kohut
  - Deputy Mayor: Gil Carlevaro
  - Trustees: Rafael Bueno, Joel I.A. Santana, and Richard Sena

Area
  - Total: 5.04 sq mi (13.06 km^{2})
  - Land: 1.98 sq mi (5.14 km^{2})
  - Water: 3.06 sq mi (7.92 km^{2})
- Elevation: 30 ft (9 m)

Population (2020)
  - Total: 12,323
  - Density: 6,210.9/sq mi (2,398.04/km^{2})
- Time zone: UTC-5 (Eastern (EST))
  - Summer (DST): UTC-4 (EDT)
- ZIP code: 10927
- Area code: 845
- FIPS code: 36-32754
- GNIS feature ID: 0952388

Haverstraw (English pronunciation: /ˈhæːvəɹstɹɔː/) is a village incorporated in 1854 in the town of Haverstraw in Rockland County, New York, United States. It is located north of Congers, southeast of West Haverstraw, east of Garnerville, northeast of New City, and west of the Hudson River at its widest point. As of the 2020 census, the population was 12,323.

The village of Haverstraw is within the North Rockland Central School District public primary and secondary school system of New York State, and the downtown hosts the Rockland Community College – Haverstraw Extension Center. As of 2009, the mayor is Michael Kohut.

== History ==
=== Settlement (1609–1750) ===
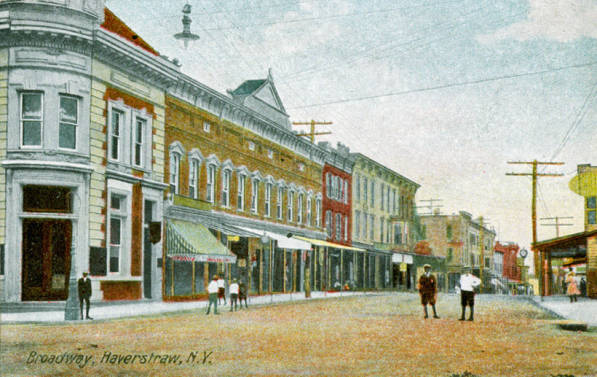
Downtown Haverstraw

Before Dutch settlers traveled to the Hudson River Valley in the early part of the seventeenth century, the Rumachenanck people, a subset of the Lenape tribe, called the area home. In 1609, during one of the many voyages the Dutch financed in search of the Northwest Passage, Henry Hudson sailed the Hudson River.

The village is one of the first to appear on maps of North America, listed as Haverstroo, which means "oat straw" as an anglicized version of a Dutch word. The area was first referred to as Haverstroo in 1616. From 1686 till 1719, the present town of Haverstraw was included in the laws, taxes and militia duties of Orangetown. But that valley was increasing so rapidly in population, the distance was so great and the trail so poor between it and Tappan, that the inhabitants petitioned for separate existence and on June 24, 1719, the following act was passed: "An Act to enable the Precincts of Haverstraw in the County of Orange, to chuse a Supervisor, a Collector, two Assessors, one Constable, and two Overseers of Highways."

The village was not incorporated as a municipality until March 11, 1854, as the Village of Warren, after Joseph Warren, a major general who died at the Battle of Breed's Hill (a.k.a. Bunker Hill) in 1775 during the Revolutionary War. Haverstraw has a complicated record of names. One Act refers to the Village of Waynesburgh, and will take an extract from this Act, passed April 1, 1814, again: "from thence, in a direct course as nearly as may be, to such a point in the village of Waynesburgh, late Warren, as the Commissioners, etc." For what reason the name Waynesburgh was given to the hamlet, and the length of time it remained 1883–84, have escaped search, but it is likely that the interim name was in honor of revolutionary General Anthony Wayne. Warren, the hamlet had already been called, and to Warren it was changed again. But this name was never a popular one. People had long been accustomed to blend the name of the township and village in one, and call the latter, Haverstraw. At the establishment of the present Stony Point post office in 1847, it was named North Haverstraw. Commerce was carried on, not with Warren, but Haverstraw, and the name of the village post office was Haverstraw from its organization. Influenced by these and other less important reasons, the residents of the village appealed to the Legislature for relief, and, on April 14, 1874, that body passed the following act:

"SECTION I. The name of the Village of Warren in the County of Rockland, incorporated under the provisions of the Statute of the State of New York, authorizing the incorporation of villages, is hereby changed to 'Haverstraw.' All proceedings now pending by or against the said Village of Warren shall be continued in the name of Haverstraw."

This village did not begin its growth as early as either Ramapo or Nyack, but for many years, until the discovery of James Wood revolutionized brick making, remained a country hamlet. In 1855, Jacob Wan-dell wrote in a letter to his sister Catherine Van Houten, the following description of the present village, at the close of the last century: "My father removed from Tappan Sloat to Haverstraw in the year 1794. There was no village there then, only one house. Captain Shepherd bought the field where the village is built, of Joseph Allison, for £10 ($25), an acre. When he moved there, it was sown with rye. The river bank was the handsomest I ever saw. From Grassy Point down to where James Wood first set a brick- yard, (this was on the river bank directly opposite the burying ground of the De Noyelles family), was a beautiful row of large chestnuts and oak trees, growing all along the banks. It was a beautiful walk."

=== American Revolution (1775–1783) ===
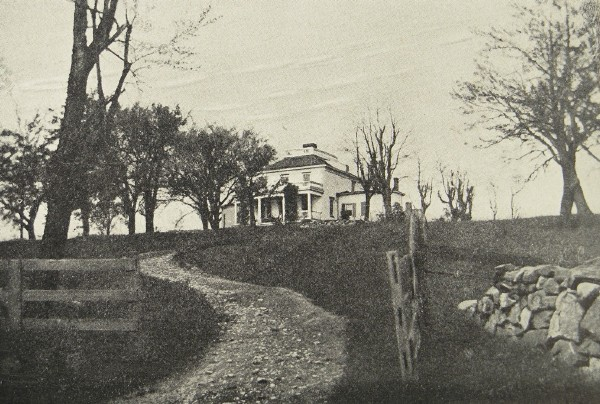
Treason House

Strategically located on the Hudson River, the village was home to a number of skirmishes between the British Army and the Continental Army during the American Revolutionary War.

The peak of High Tor Mountain on the Long Path hosted Continental Army watchfires to communicate between troops installments up and down the Hudson River. Today, watchfires are an annual Memorial Day tradition in Haverstraw. Watchfires are lit at midnight on May 30 and burn for 24 hours.

Haverstraw was the site of the most grievous treason of the early years of the United States. During the night of September 21–22, 1780, the English emissary, Major John André, was rowed from the sloop-of-war Vulture to a beach below the Long Cove on the southern boundary of Haverstraw. The negotiations to sell the plans to West Point were not completed by dawn, and Benedict Arnold and André traveled to the Belmont House, owned by Thomas Smith and occupied by his brother Joshua Hett Smith, on the grounds of what is now Helen Hayes Hospital in West Haverstraw. The house has since been known as the Treason House.

=== 95th New York Volunteer Infantry ===
The 95th New York Volunteer Infantry fought in the American Civil War under the command of Ulysses S. Grant, Major General James Samuel Wadsworth and Brigadier General Edmund Rice. Company F was recruited primarily from Haverstraw. The infantry joined in the action of the Railroad Cut on the first day of the Battle of Gettysburg. They fought many battles, including the Battle of Mine Run, Grant's Overland Campaign, the Battle of the Wilderness, Spotsylvania Court House, North Anna, Cold Harbor and the Siege of Petersburg. They saw the war to the end, including engagements in the Battle of the Weldon Railroad, the Battle of Hatcher's Run, and the Appomattox Campaign.

=== Brick-making capital of the world ===
Commonly referred to as "Bricktown", Haverstraw was famous for its brick-making, which was a major industry for the village. Brick-making was so popular due to the clay formed by the Hudson River's water and the rich soil that lined Haverstraw's waterfront, that it was nicknamed the "brickmaking capital of the world". Many of the old brownstone and brick structures that were constructed in New York City in the late 1890s-early 1900s were composed of bricks manufactured by Haverstraw. In the early 20th century, there were more than 40 brick-making factories lining the Hudson River within the village. Although brick-making involved all ethnic groups, 60 percent of the brickyard workers were African Americans.

=== Brick manufacturers circa 1910 ===
This is a list of suppliers of bricks to New York City metropolitan areas in 1910 with the numbers of machines each manufacturer used, as listed in Within These Gates by Daniel deNoyelles:

- Archer Yard No. 2 – 4
- B. J. Allison & Co. – 7
- Bennett, Mrs. William & Sons – 4
- Brophy & Morrissey – 4
- C. & G. A. Archer – 2
- D. Fowler Jr. & Co. – 5
- DeNoyelles Brick Co. – 13
- Dunnigan, Mrs. F. L. – 3
- E. N. Renn & Co. – 4
- Everett Fowler – 4
- Excelsior Brick Co. – 7
- F. Brophy & Brother – 3
- Fowler & Son – 6
- Garner Brick Works – 6
- J. Nicholson – 2
- James Byrnes – 2
- L. H. Washburn – 2
- Lynch & O'Brien – 2
- Lynch Bros. – 4
- Malley Brick Co. – 7
- Morrissey & Co. – 5
- Peck Brick Co. – 6
- Reilly & Tanney – 2
- Riley & Marks – 4
- Riley & Rose – 3
- Shankey & Morrissey – 4
- Snedeker Bros. – 2
- T. McGuire & Son – 4
- T. Shankey & Son – 4
- T. Tanney – 4
- Tanney & Coyne – 2
- U. F. Washburn & Co. – 11
- Washburn & Fowler – 3
- Wood & Allison – 4

=== Other history ===
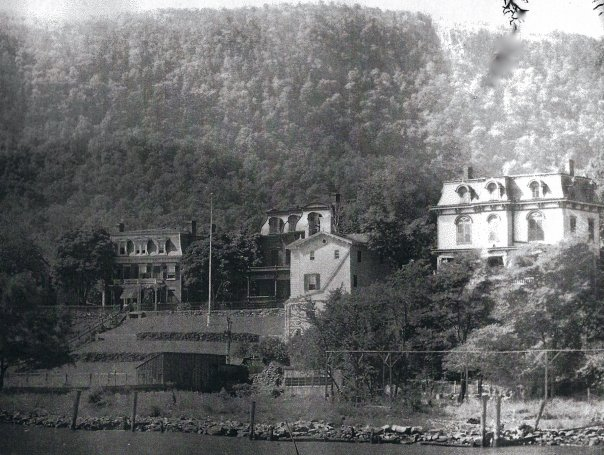
Front Street from the river

The brick industry continued to thrive until World War II, when brick began to lose its value significantly. Shortly after, the village's main industry of brickmaking declined and left the village. The economic vitality of the village greatly decreased. Because of the amount of vacancies and the relatively inexpensive housing available, the village opened up to Hispanic migration, and the village has become home to many Hispanic immigrant families since the 1950s. Many families of Hispanic descent take part in the village's annual festivals. The Puerto Rican Day Parade and Festival take place in the village's downtown in early June, and the Dominican Day Parade and Festival occur in late August and in September.

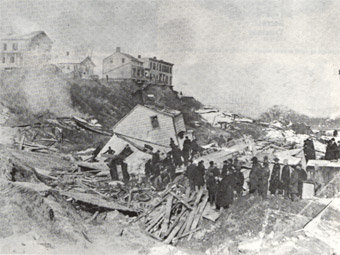
Great Haverstraw Landslide of 1906

On the night of January 8, 1906, a landslide destroyed a large residential and commercial portion of the village. Firefighters responded immediately but faced enormous odds because of burst valves and water mains, natural gas explosions and hoses which periodically froze because of the extreme cold. The landslide, a pit about 150 feet (46 m) deep, claimed five Haverstraw blocks from Allison to Jefferson Street, 21 buildings, and the lives of 4 firefighters and 17 residents. Despite the events, the village rebounded. Eight years later, however, the Cleary-Newman murder took place, which cast a pall of corruption over the populace. In 2007, leaders of the village and town announced the 101st anniversary of the landslide and dedicated a memorial to the victims of the disaster. The memorial is located at Bowline Point Park on the shore of Bowline Pond and the Hudson River.

In July 1920, New York Yankees outfielder Babe Ruth spent time in Haverstraw to film a movie – Headin' Home. A local baseball field bears the Hall of Famer's name due to his visit.

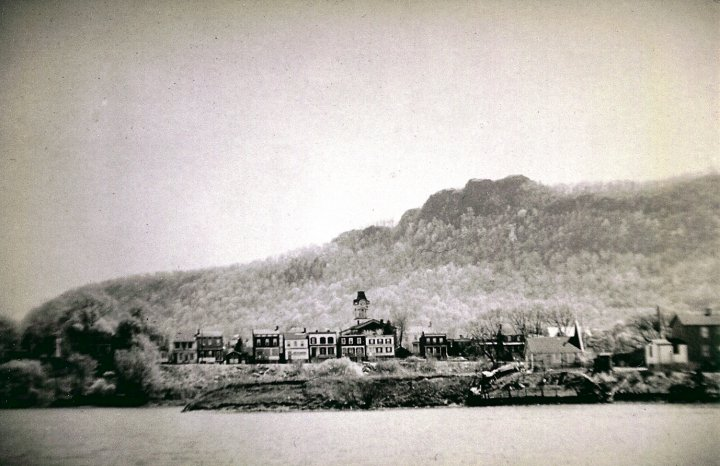
Haverstraw Village from Bowline Pond

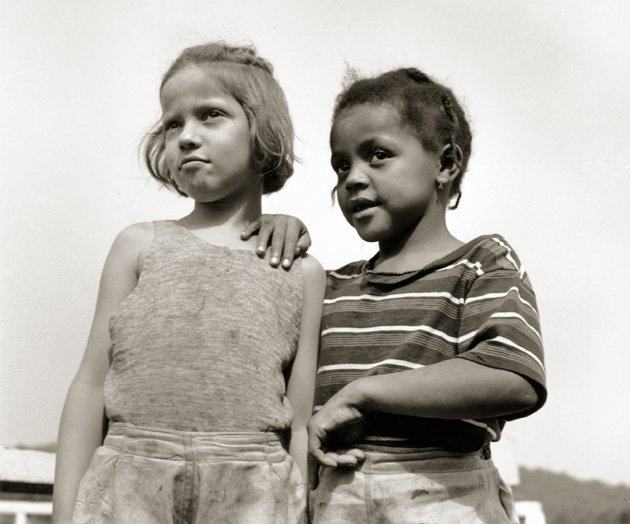
Camp buddies at Camp Christmas Seals

George M. Cohan, the "Father of Modern Broadway", had his debut playing the violin at the Waldron's Opera House on Broadway in the village. The Cohan family stayed in Haverstraw during summer while making their rounds on the vaudeville circuit. The Cohans lived on Division Street, next to a major clay pit in the Village. Cohan was influenced early in his life by the songs of the southern black clay diggers that worked down below the Cohan house in the clay pit. It is often said that Cohan mainstreamed ragtime and jazz through his Broadway tunes.

September 2004 marked the village's 150th anniversary, celebrated by a festival along the village's waterfront. The village has entered a period of revitalization, which coincides with the creation of the Harbors at Haverstraw Community and a sculpture trail which will follow the Hudson River shoreline. The Harbors at Haverstraw is situated on the southern end of the Village and below the higher elevations of the charming riverside southernmost neighborhood known as Dutchtown. Some residents have taken to calling the Harbors area the "South End" instead of the previous name for the neighborhood the "mud hole" in honor of various clay pits once visible here. The State has funded $3 million to the revitalization project, which includes investments on the waterfront esplanade and a possible downtown streetscape project.

As a cost-saving measure, at midnight on January 1, 2006, the Village of Haverstraw Police Department was merged with the Town of Haverstraw Police Department. The town of Clarkstown Police opened a new shooting range that the town of Haverstraw and other departments use at Tilcon Quarry area.

In April 2012, the Village of Haverstraw passed the first ban on tobacco product display in the United States, though the New York Association of Convenience Stores and seven tobacco companies (Lorillard Tobacco Company, R. J. Reynolds Tobacco Company, Philip Morris USA, Santa Fe Natural Tobacco Company, American Snuff Company, U.S. Smokeless Tobacco Company, and John Middleton Co.) sued to stop the ban in the United States District Court for the Southern District of New York in June of that year.

=== Camp Christmas Seals ===
Camp Christmas Seals - (interracial camp), where children were aided by the Methodist Camp Service. Mrs. Addie C. Cox, director, the "mother" of all the campers. Activities included boating, fishing and swimming at nearby Lake Tiorati, one of the seven main lakes in Harriman State Park, located in Orange County, New York.

== Geography ==
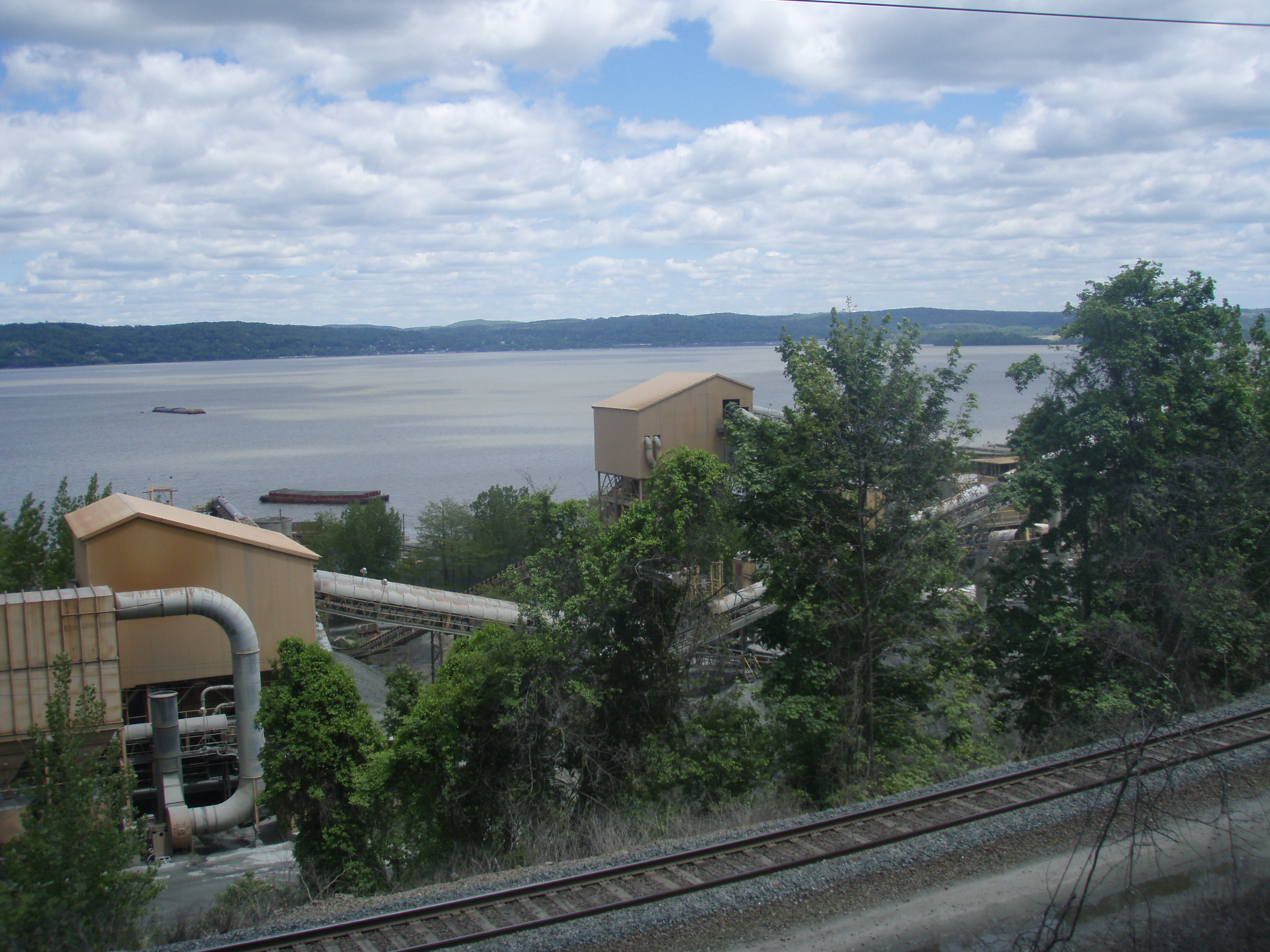
Haverstraw Bay

Haverstraw is on the west bank of the Hudson River. Haverstraw Bay is the widest portion of the Hudson River. The bay is bordered by the village of Haverstraw and the village of Croton-on-Hudson in Westchester County to the east.

Haverstraw is located at 41°11′47″N 73°58′0″W (41.196494, −73.96684).

According to the United States Census Bureau, the village has a total area of 5.1 square miles (13.1 km^{2}), of which 2.0 square miles (5.2 km^{2}) is land and 3.1 square miles (8.0 km^{2}), or 60.75%, is water.

== Neighborhoods ==
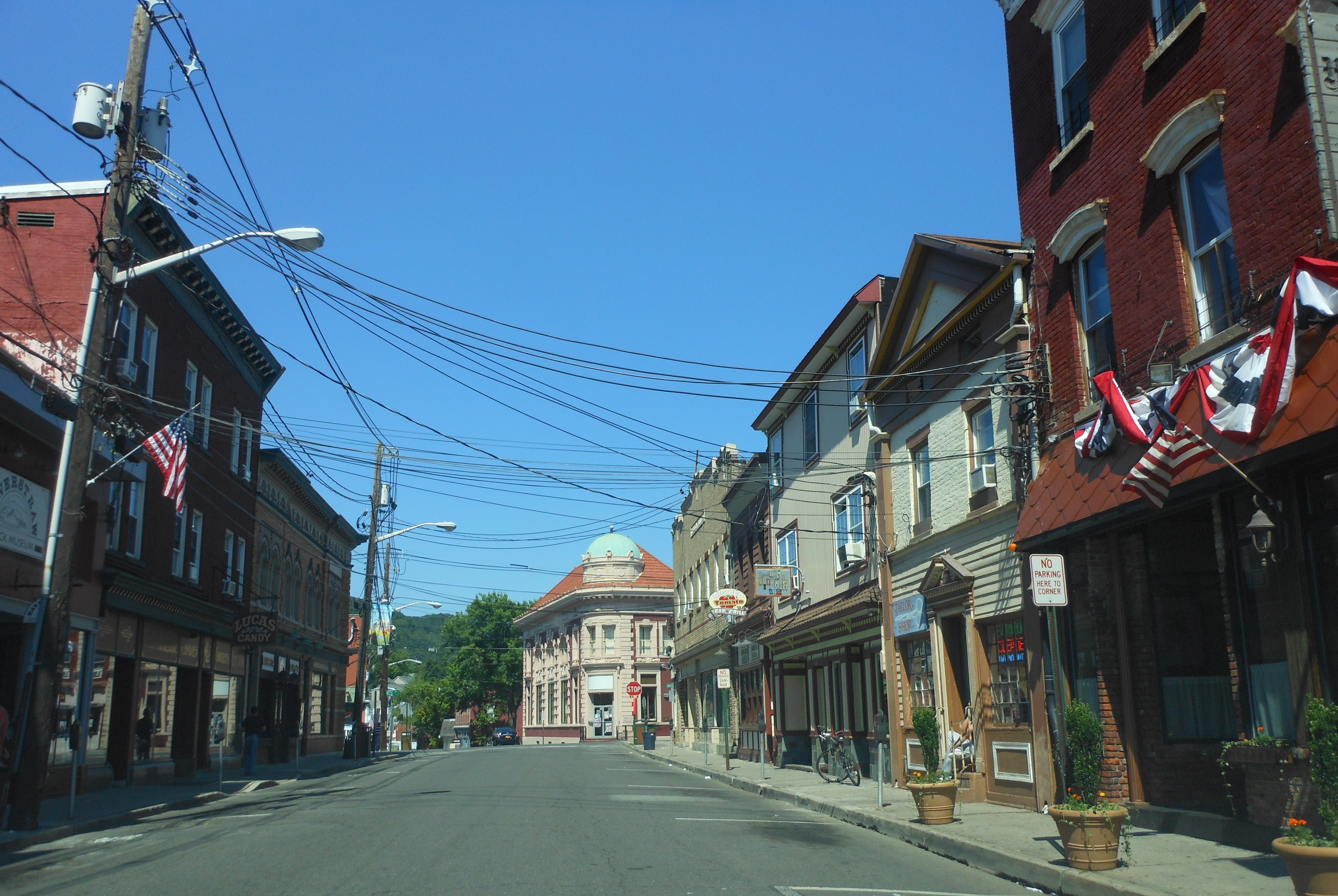
Downtown Haverstraw, NY

- Bank Corner - downtown center
- Hahn's Corner - intersection of Westside Avenue and Broadway
- South End - "the mud hole," the harbors community and surrounding residential areas
- Dutchtown - Riverside Avenue at northern terminus of the Hook Mountain Nyack Beach Trail
- Uptown - stately, residential district on Hudson Avenue and Hillside Avenue
- Little Italy - Warren Avenue and McKenzie Avenue
- Old Quarter - residential district on Front Street, 1st, 2nd, 3rd, and 4th Street, bounded by Van Houten Street, Canal Street and Broad Street
- Bull Line Blaff - Jefferson Street and Clinton Street
- North Broadway - where Broadway meets Samsondale Avenue
- Silk Mill - between Gurnee Avenue and Spring Street

== Demographics ==
Historical population
Census	Pop.	Note	%±
1880	3,506		—
1890	5,070		44.6%
1900	5,935		17.1%
1910	5,669		−4.5%
1920	5,226		−7.8%
1930	5,621		7.6%
1940	5,909		5.1%
1950	5,818		−1.5%
1960	5,771		−0.8%
1970	8,198		42.1%
1980	8,800		7.3%
1990	9,438		7.3%
2000	10,117		7.2%
2010	11,910		17.7%
2020	12,323		3.5%
U.S. Decennial Census

As of the census of 2000, there were 10,117 people, 2,816 households, and 2,168 families residing in the village. The population density was 5,078.8 inhabitants per square mile (1,960.9/km^{2}). There were 2,925 housing units at an average density of 1,468.4 per square mile (567.0/km^{2}). The racial makeup of the village was 46.02% white, 12.07% black or African American, 0.37% Native American, 1.09% Asian, 0.13% Pacific Islander, 34.70% from other races, and 5.62% from two or more races. Hispanic or Latino of any race were 59.29% of the population.

There were 2,816 households, out of which 43.5% had children under the age of 18 living with them, 47.1% were married couples living together, 23.0% had a female householder with no husband present, and 23.0% were non-families. 17.9% of all households were made up of individuals, and 7.4% had someone living alone who was 65 years of age or older. The average household size was 3.42 and the average family size was 3.82.

In the village, the population was spread out, with 28.6% under the age of 18, 10.9% from 18 to 24, 30.7% from 25 to 44, 18.9% from 45 to 64, and 10.9% who were 65 years of age or older. The median age was 32 years. For every 100 females, there were 93.0 males. For every 100 females age 18 and over, there were 89.9 males.

The median income for a household in the village was $42,683, and the median income for a family was $44,881. Males had a median income of $31,503 versus $27,207 for females. The per capita income for the village was $15,442. About 13.9% of families and 16.9% of the population were below the poverty line, including 18.4% of those under age 18 and 23.0% of those age 65 or over.

As of the 2010 census, the population was 11,910, and demographics were as follows:

- Hispanic 67.1%
- White alone: 19.3%
- Black or African American alone: 9.7%
- American Indian and Alaska Native alone: 0.2%
- Asian alone: 2.2%
- Native Hawaiian and Other Pacific Islander alone: 0.0%
- Some Other Race alone: 0.1%
- Two or More Races: 1.4%

== Transportation ==
NY Central RR

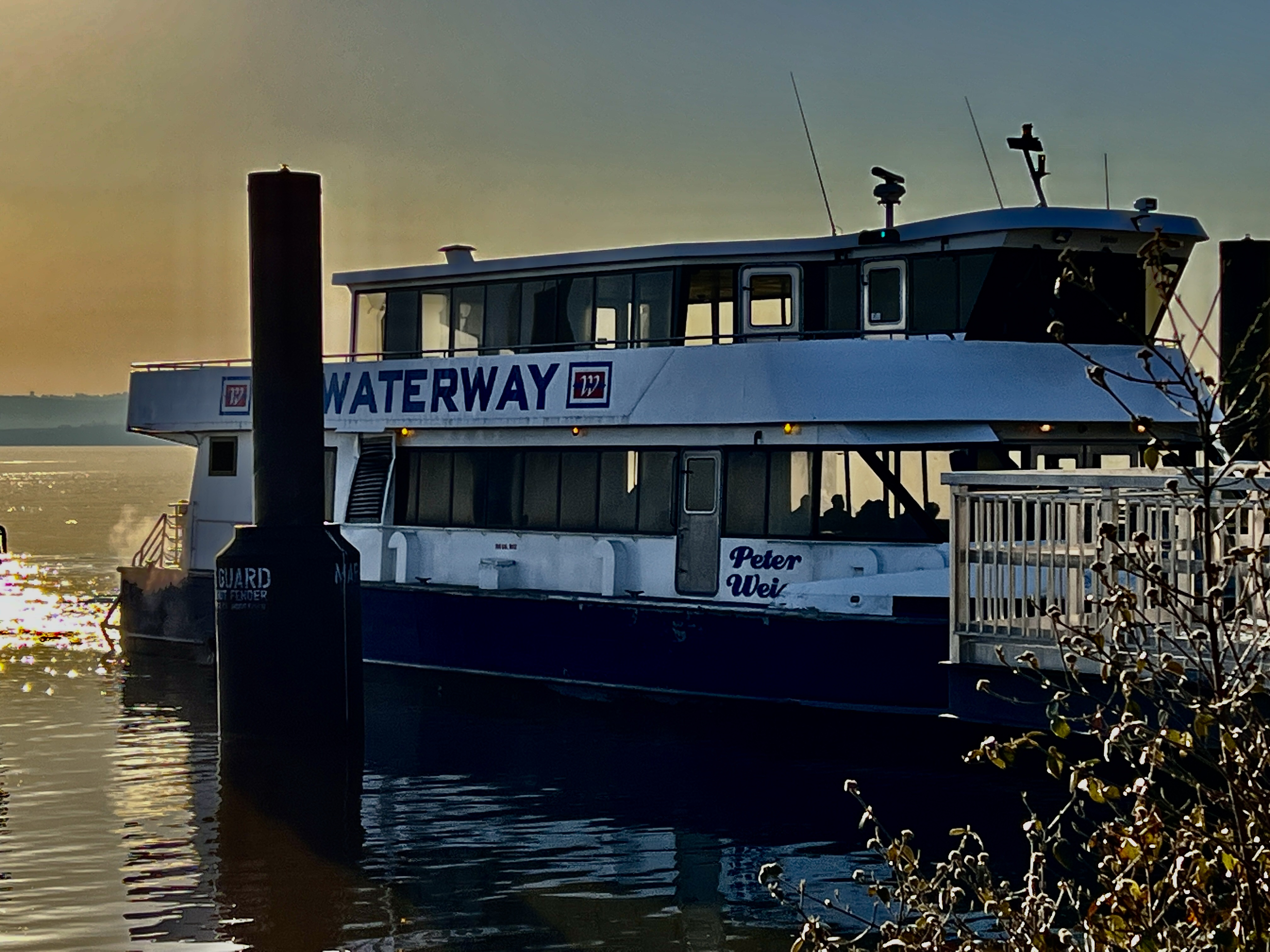
Peter R. Weiss, Haverstraw-Ossining Ferry

The River Subdivision runs through the village of Haverstraw as a freight-only line, which has an important passing siding located at milepost 35. The River Subdivision is the primary freight rail line between the New York City – Northeastern New Jersey metropolitan area and Albany. Today, the line is operated by CSX Transportation, the fourth railroad to do so. On an average day 20–25 trains pass through Haverstraw. Passenger service along the former West Shore Railroad line stopped on September 11, 1959, although the former Haverstraw station building is still standing and currently serves as a law office.

NY Waterway runs a commuter ferry from Haverstraw Village to Ossining, from where there are commuter trains to Grand Central Terminal. A monthly uniticket for the Haverstraw–Ossining Ferry and the train is available from Metro-North. Local transit is operated by Transport of Rockland. The #91, #95, and #97 routes serve Haverstraw.

Short Line, part of Coach USA, provides daily service along U.S. Route 9W heading to and from the Port Authority Bus Terminal in Midtown Manhattan and West Point Military Academy or Newburgh.

U.S. Route 9W and US 202 run directly through the village. U.S. Route 9W is a major cycling route between New York City and Bear Mountain State Park and West Point Military Academy. The route regularly hosts the Gran Fondo cycling endurance race.

== Tourism ==
=== Historical markers ===
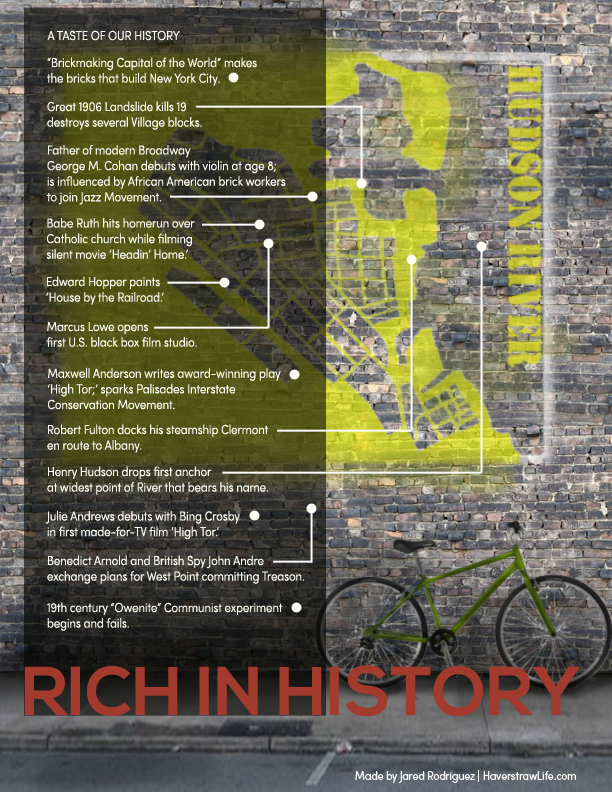

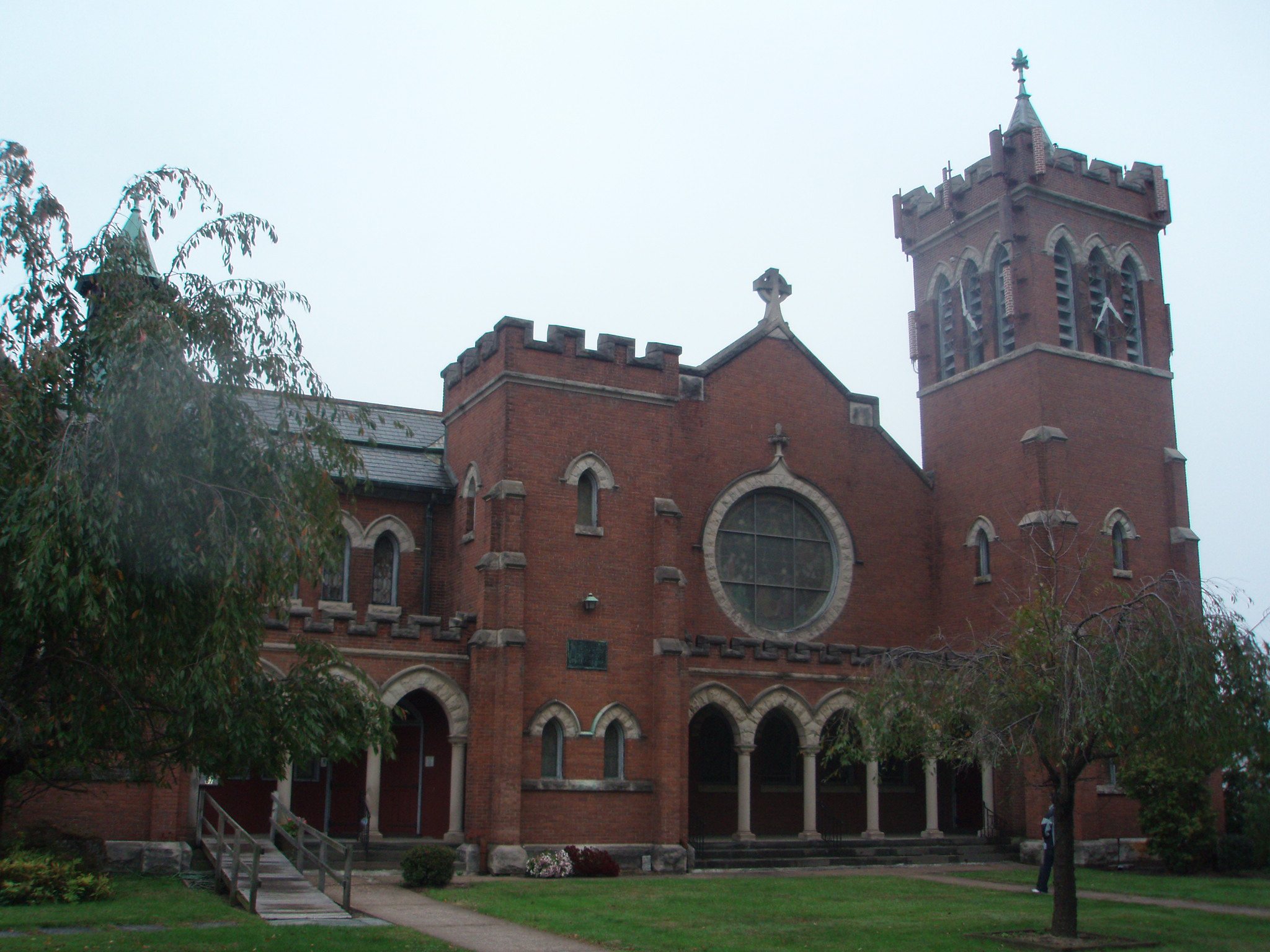
Central Presbyterian Church in Haverstraw

- "Treason Site," Route 9W, where Benedict Arnold met Major John André, a British military intelligence officer, on September 21, 1780, to negotiate the sale of the plans for West Point - now located at Emeline (Nantasket) Park and Main Street.
- "Cohan's Debut," Waldron's Opera House site - Broadway and Lincoln Street
- "Hudson River," Widest Point of River - Front/First Street and Elks Drive
- 1906 "Great Haverstraw Landslide" - Division and Rockland Street
- "Brick Industry" - 183 West Street
- "DeHarte Patent" - 79 North Route 9W
- Haverstraw Historic Site - 25 Fairmount Avenue
- Robert Fulton Clermont Steamship Berth - Emeline (Nantasket) Park at Main Street
- Bowline Pond Clay Pit - Broadway at Jefferson Street
- Site of Peck's Dock and small-gauge rail terminal - Utility Pier at Bowline Point Park
- Twin Second Empire Mansions - South end of Clove Avenue
- Site of Babe Ruth home run over St. Peter's Church during filming of 'Headin' Home' Silent Film - Partition Street at Haverstraw Middle School
- Site of the "Franklin Community," an early Communist experimental community influenced by Robert Owen - Spring Street and Rela Avenue
- Site of Franklin Delano Roosevelt address in bid for U.S. presidency at the United States Hotel - Now U.S. Post Office at Main Street and First Street
- Central Presbyterian Church boasts extinct American Chestnut ceilings and stained glass windows designed by Louis Comfort Tiffany - New Main Street and Hudson Avenue

=== Landmarks and places of interest ===
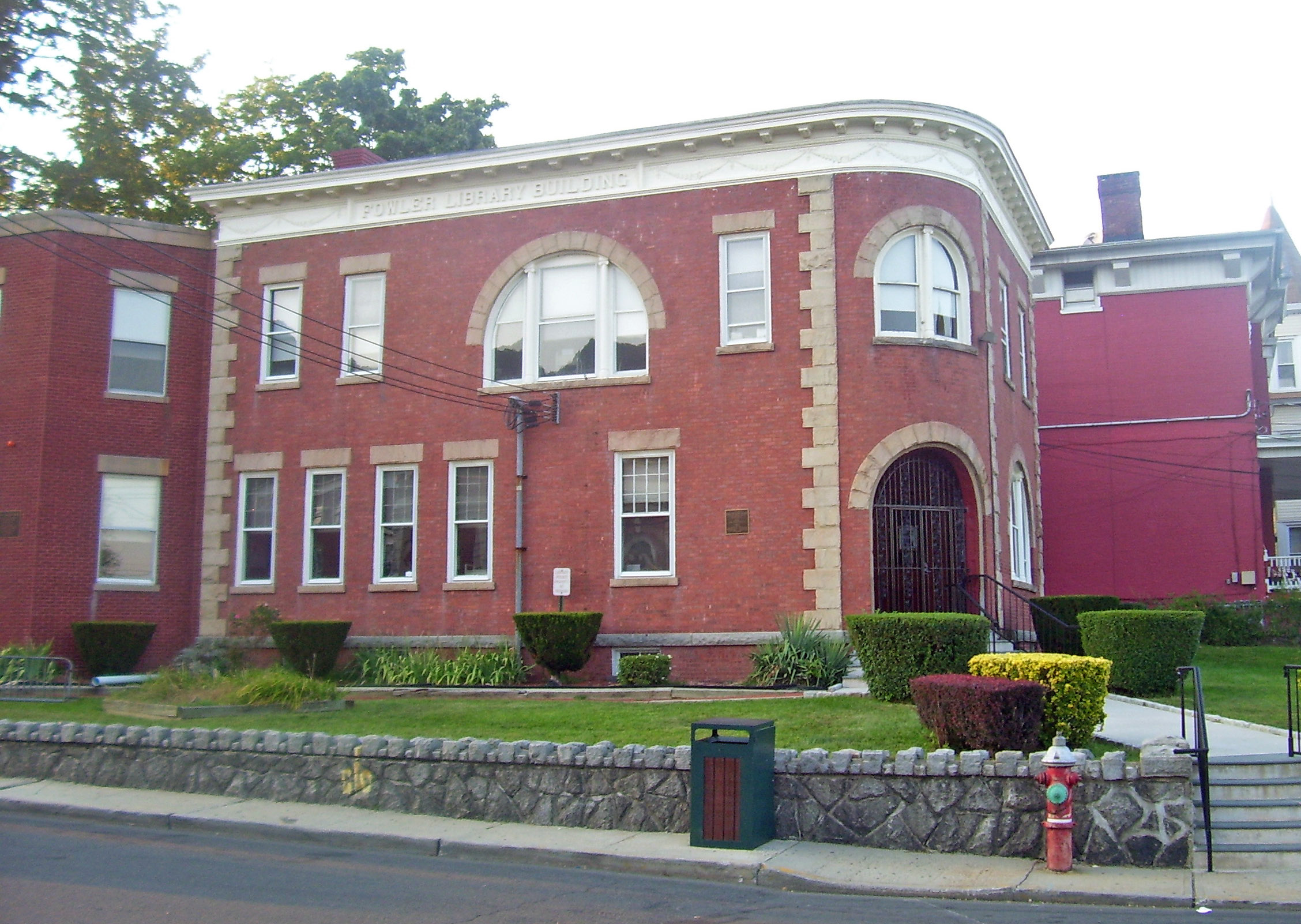
Haverstraw King's Daughters Village Library

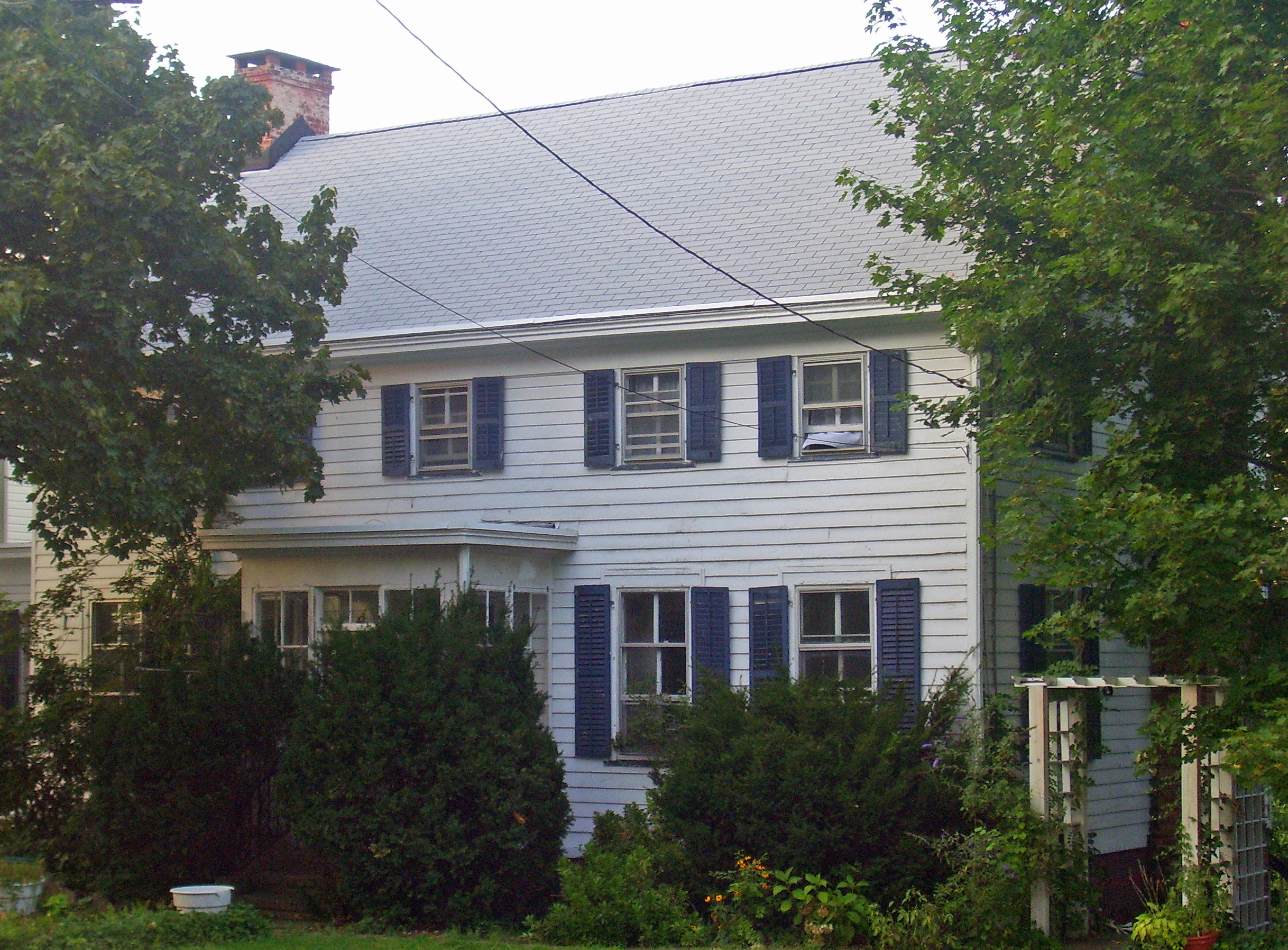
The Homestead

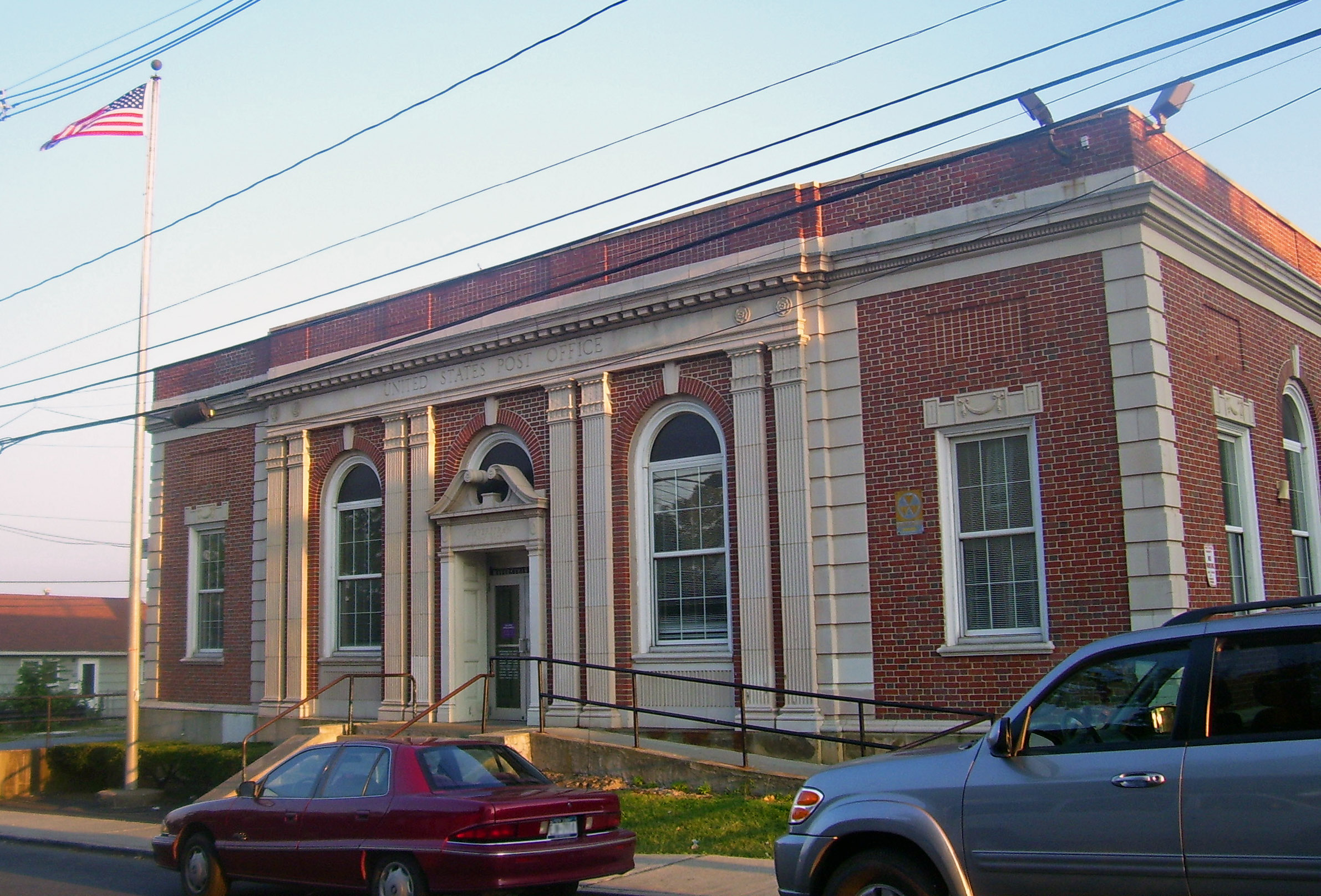
Haverstraw's U.S. Post Office

- Arts Alliance of Haverstraw, 91 Broadway, is a multicultural center for the arts.
- Central Presbyterian Church, 64 New Main Street at intersection with Hudson Avenue, was founded in 1846 and moved to its present church in 1909, which was built with donated Haverstraw brick and now-scarce American Chestnut wood. The 13 stained-glass windows in the main sanctuary were designed by Louis Comfort Tiffany.
- House depicted in Edward Hopper's painting The House By The Railroad, located along Route 9W just north of New Main Street. The house also inspired the Bates' house set used in Alfred Hitchcock's 1960 movie Psycho.
- Haverstraw African American Memorial Park 41 Clinton St. Haverstraw, NY 10927. The park features a kiosk with displays about local history and the African diaspora. including the history of the African Methodist Episcopal Bethel Church, founded by slaves and free blacks in 1846. The church was Rockland's first house of worship for blacks.
  - Harriet Tubman Statue - Beacon of Hope
- Haverstraw Brick Museum, 12 Main Street, has exhibits of the over 100-year history of brick-making in the Haverstraw area, once known as "the brick-making capital of the world".
- Haverstraw King's Daughters Village Library, 85 Main Street, is the oldest public library in Rockland County, chartered in 1895. The library opened in Jenkins Hall in 1896 and moved to the National Bank Building the following year. The King's Daughters Society, organized in 1891, was known as the "Haverstraw Ladies Home Mission Circle". Mrs. Everett Fowler, whose husband was president to The Peoples Bank, a state bank, presented a plan to found a public library as a department of the society. In July 1899 the library trustees accepted Denton Fowler's proposition to match the $10,000 for the purchase of the library's present site, which included the provision that the building be named the "Fowler Library Building". The building was constructed with Haverstraw brick from the Fowlers' brickyard. The imprint DF&S can be read on the bricks laid for the basement's floor. During the holiday seasons the library provided baskets for the poor, and throughout the year the library conducted sewing classes for the girls of the village. The library was active in providing relief for the victims of the landslide in 1906. (NRHP)
- The Homestead, Hudson Avenue, is a historic house that is one of the oldest buildings in the village, dating to the early 19th century. In 1983 it was listed on the National Register of Historic Places (NRHP).
- M/V Commander, Haverstraw Marina, is a rare design link between the heavily built-for-steam boats of the late 19th century and the more lightly built vessels of the 20th century. It was listed in 1984 on both the State and National Registers of Historic Places and is also listed in the International Register of Historic Ships, Great American Ships and the Dictionary of American Naval Fighting Ships. It may be chartered for private parties and excursions. (NRHP)
- United States Post Office (Haverstraw, New York), 86 Main Street, is listed on the NRHP.
- St. Peter's Roman Catholic Church, 115 Broadway, is the oldest Catholic church in Rockland County and is where the first Mass was offered on November 14, 1847.
- The Congregation of the Sons of Jacob, 37 Clove Avenue, begun in 1877, is the oldest Jewish congregation in Rockland County.

=== Festivals and events ===
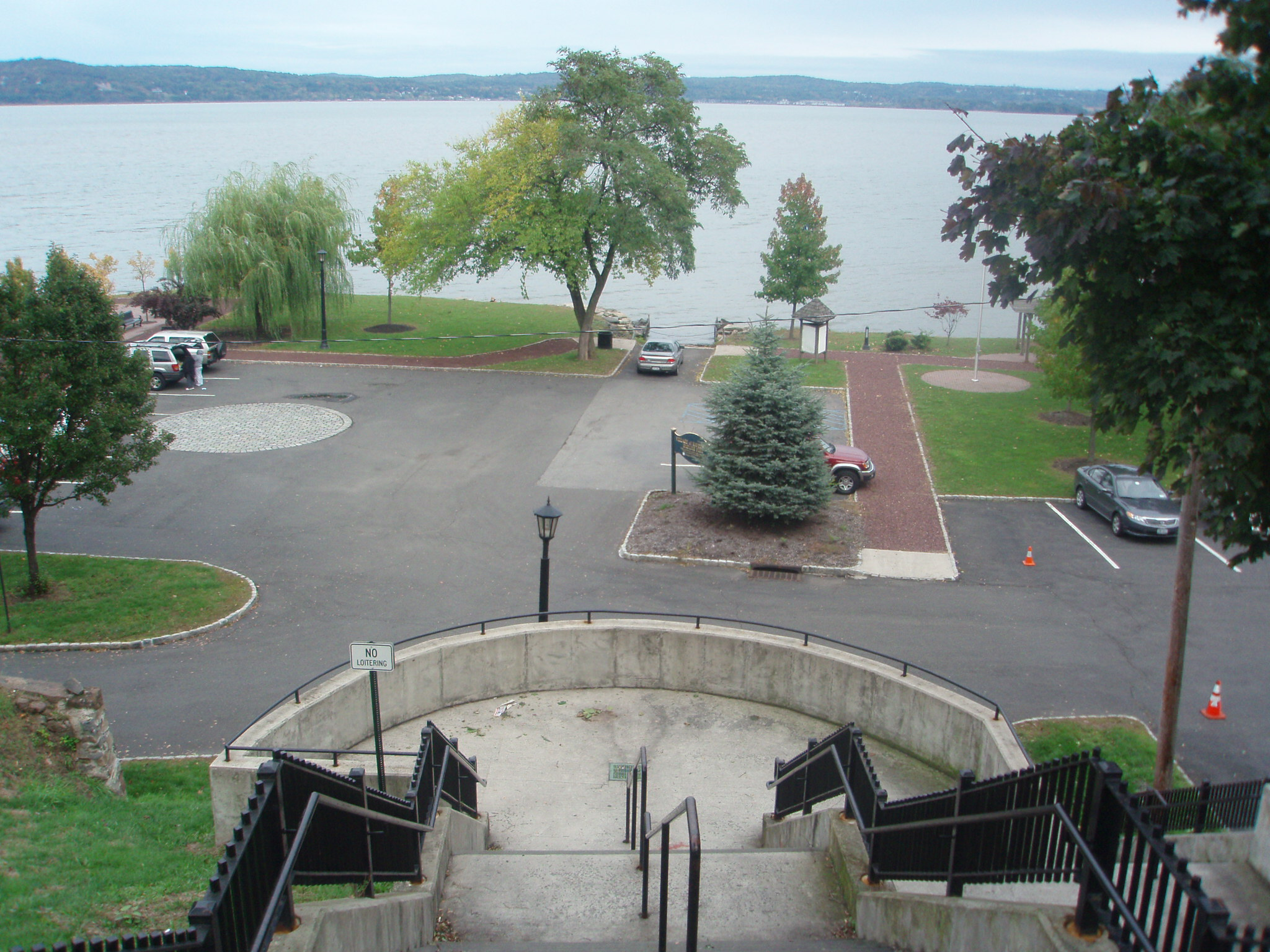
Waterfront Park in Downtown Haverstraw

The following festivals and parades are celebrated in the village of Haverstraw.

- Family Day Festival – celebrated in May
- Farmers' Market – held every Sunday from May to November 9:00 am until 2:00 pm
- Italian Day Festival – In May Italian Americans celebrate their heritage.
- Annual Brickyard 5000 Regatta – hosted annually in October at the Haverstraw-Ossining Ferry Landing.

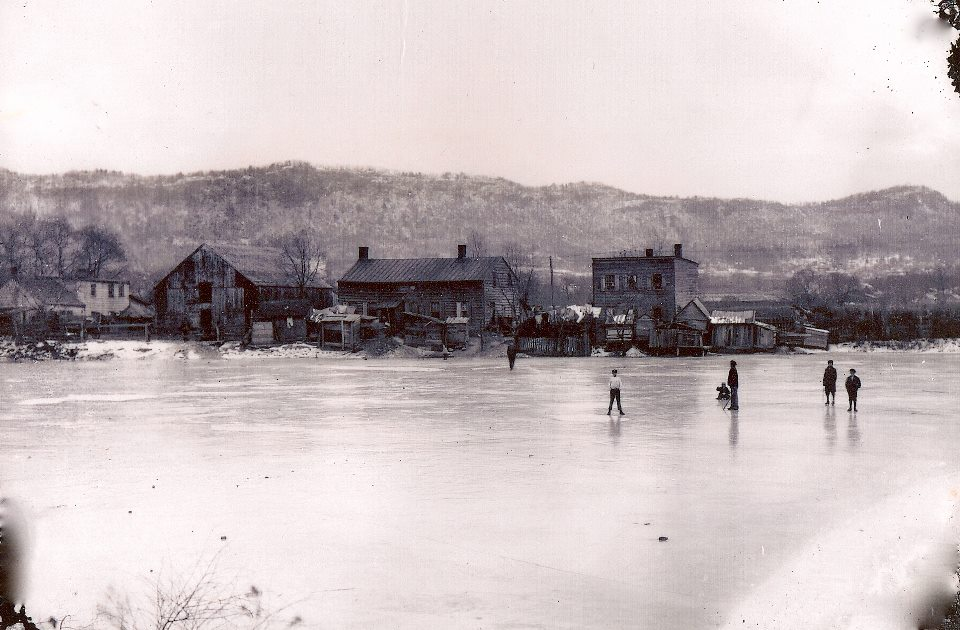
Ice skating on Peck's Pond

== Sports ==
In 2009, Haverstraw was the Girls Little League Baseball Seniors Division state champion, beating the 2008 champion from New Hyde Park by a score of 1–0, leading them to the Eastern regionals in Worcester, Massachusetts.

In 2010, the team were the Girls Little League Baseball Seniors Division state and Eastern regional champions. They defeated national teams from Germany, Puerto Rico and Guam, before losing 3–1 to San Antonio, Southwest regional champions, in the World Series Championship in Roxana, Delaware, on August 14, 2010.

In 2014, Haverstraw was the Boys Junior league Baseball New York State Champions. They went on to play in the Eastern Regionals in New Jersey. In 2019 Havestraw won New York State Little League State championship and came one win away from the Little League World Series losing in the Mid-Atlantic region to Connecticut and the girls softball finished third in New York State. In 2021 the girls Little League Softball team won the New York state championship going to the Little League World Series in Greenville, NC losing in the second round to Texas and Missouri. In 2019 Havestraw Little League Softball finished third in New York. In 1958 the Havestraw Little League won New York state championship losing in the East Regionals to the eventual regional champion Connecticut.

== Notable people ==
- Gerard Benderoth (February 1, 1969 - March 8, 2017), Haverstraw patrolman and World's Strongest Man competitor in 2009. Benderoth, a native of Haverstraw known as "The White Rhino", is a North Rockland High School graduate and former New York City patrolman. He turned professional in 2004 and was ranked at one time in the top 10 in the United States.
- George M. Cohan (July 3, 1878 – November 5, 1942), entertainer, playwright, composer, lyricist, actor, singer, dancer and producer. Known as "the man who owned Broadway" in the decade before World War I, he is considered the father of American musical comedy. A full-length dramatic musical entitled George M that depicted his life and which celebrated his music was produced on Broadway in 1968, as did the Academy Award-winning film Yankee Doodle Dandy in 1942. The Cohan family used to live on the easterly end of Division Street.
- Michael A. Donaldson (January 16, 1884 – April 12, 1970), United States Army sergeant and a recipient of the United States military's highest decoration, the Medal of Honor, for his actions in France during World War I.
- Derrick Lassic (born January 26, 1970, in the village), NFL running back and former husband of Arthel Neville
- Toni Morrison, first African American to be selected for the Nobel Prize in Literature, owns a home in the village. Her novel Beloved won the 1988 Pulitzer Prize for fiction. She has earned the designation of one of the 100 Greatest African Americans of the United States.

=== Notable people buried in Mount Repose Cemetery ===
- Peter Denoyelles (1766–1829), U.S. Representative from New York to the 13th United States Congress
- Ginny Gibson (1924–1998), professional name for Virginia Criger, a singer who flourished in the 1950s
- Reuben L. Haskell (October 5, 1878 – October 2, 1971), U.S. Representative from New York from March 4, 1915, until December 31, 1919
- Lotte Lenya (October 18, 1898 – November 27, 1981), Austrian-born, Tony Award-winning and Academy Award-nominated singer and actress
- Kurt Weill (March 2, 1900 – April 3, 1950), German-born, leading composer for the stage and writer of numbers of concert works. Most notable work is the song "Mack the Knife". Married to Lotte Lenya twice – (1926 and 1937).
- Leonidas Hubbard, Jr. Explorer, sportsman, writer, who perished in 1903 during an expedition in Labrador.
- Robert A. Widenmann (January 24, 1852 – April 13, 1930), National Democratic candidate for U.S. Representative from New York 17th District, 1896. Director of the Haverstraw Light and Fuel Co. Deputy United States Marshal and associate of Billy the Kid during the Lincoln County War

== General references ==
- Williams, Margaret (2004) Haverstraw. Avocet Press Inc. ISBN 0-9725078-1-7
