= Cleary–Newman murder =

20th-century scandal in New York, US

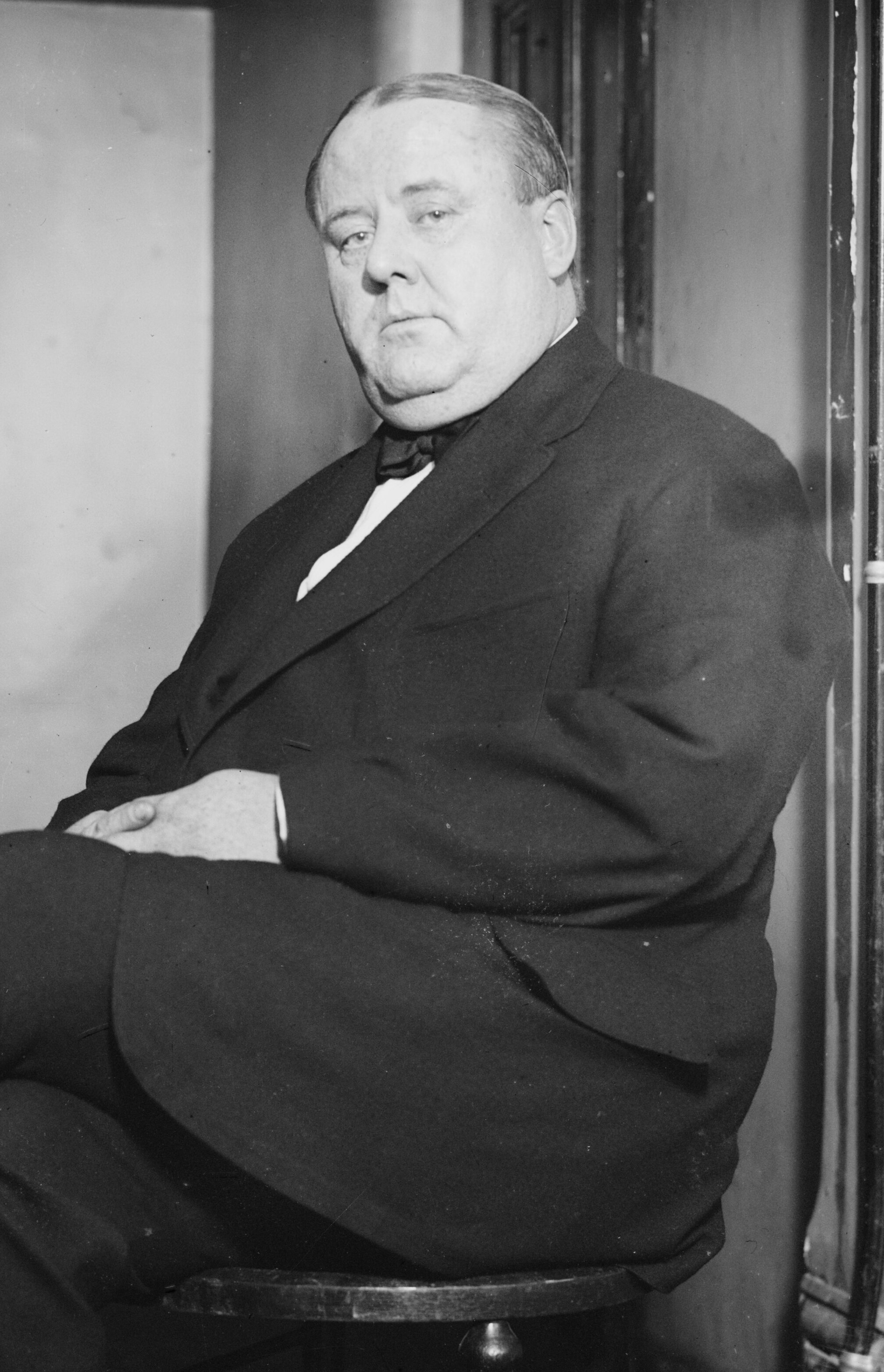
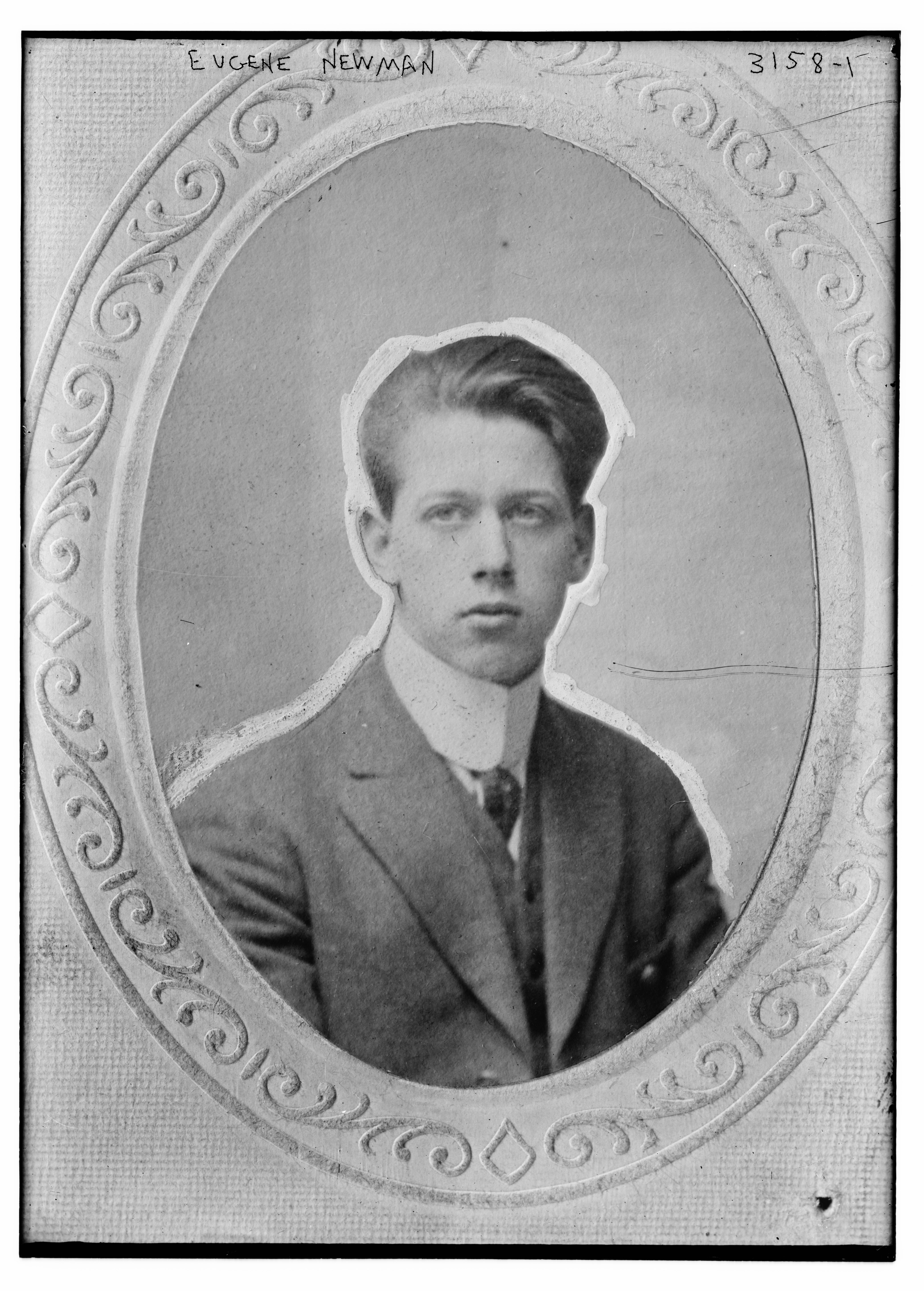
Photographs of Cleary and Newman

The Cleary–Newman murder case was a major scandal involving political and legal corruption in New York State. It was called, by the New York Daily News, "one of the most notable murder cases in the annals of New York crime." The New York Times devoted ongoing front-page coverage, next to the news of the events leading to World War I in Europe.

On July 23, 1914, in the village of Haverstraw, 20 miles north of New York City, the boss of the local Democratic political machine, William V. Cleary, shot and murdered his 18-year-old son-in-law, Eugene M. Newman, the son of a local newspaper publisher. In a dramatic trial five months later, Cleary was acquitted by a jury packed with his political supporters. This trial immediately became the subject of an intensive inquiry by a special New York State commission. The commission uncovered gross irregularities in the handling of this case, but took virtually no corrective action.

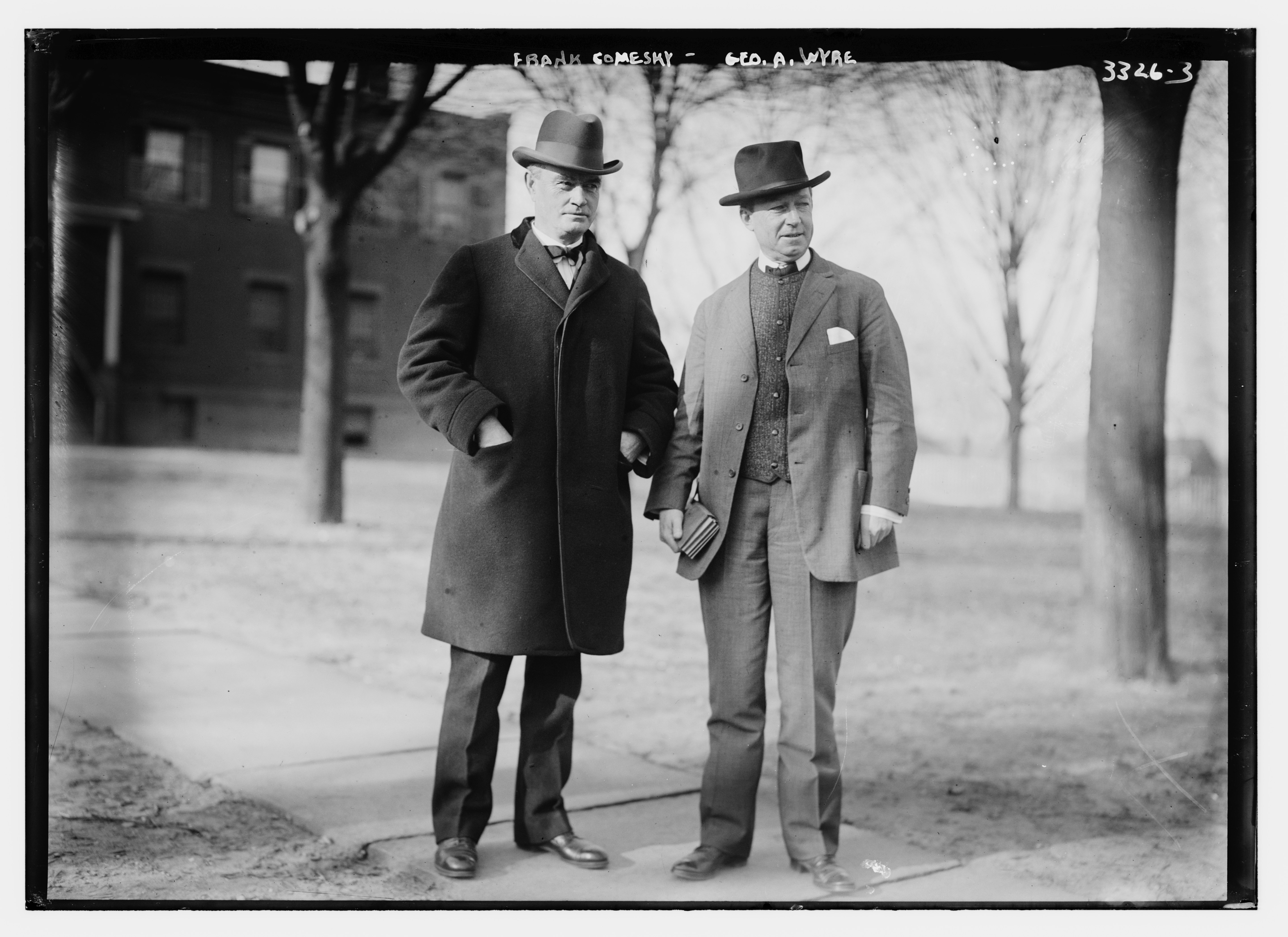
Defense attorneys Frank Comesky and George A. Wyre

Cleary's defense was temporary insanity, brought on, he claimed, by the fact that Newman had impregnated, then secretly married, Cleary's daughter Anna. Anna testified in her father's defense, that Cleary had known about the pregnancy but not about the wedding. This, along with Cleary's dramatic embrace of Anna as she was called to the stand, was said to have had an inordinate emotional impact upon the jury. But probably of greater importance was Cleary's political influence upon the legal proceedings.

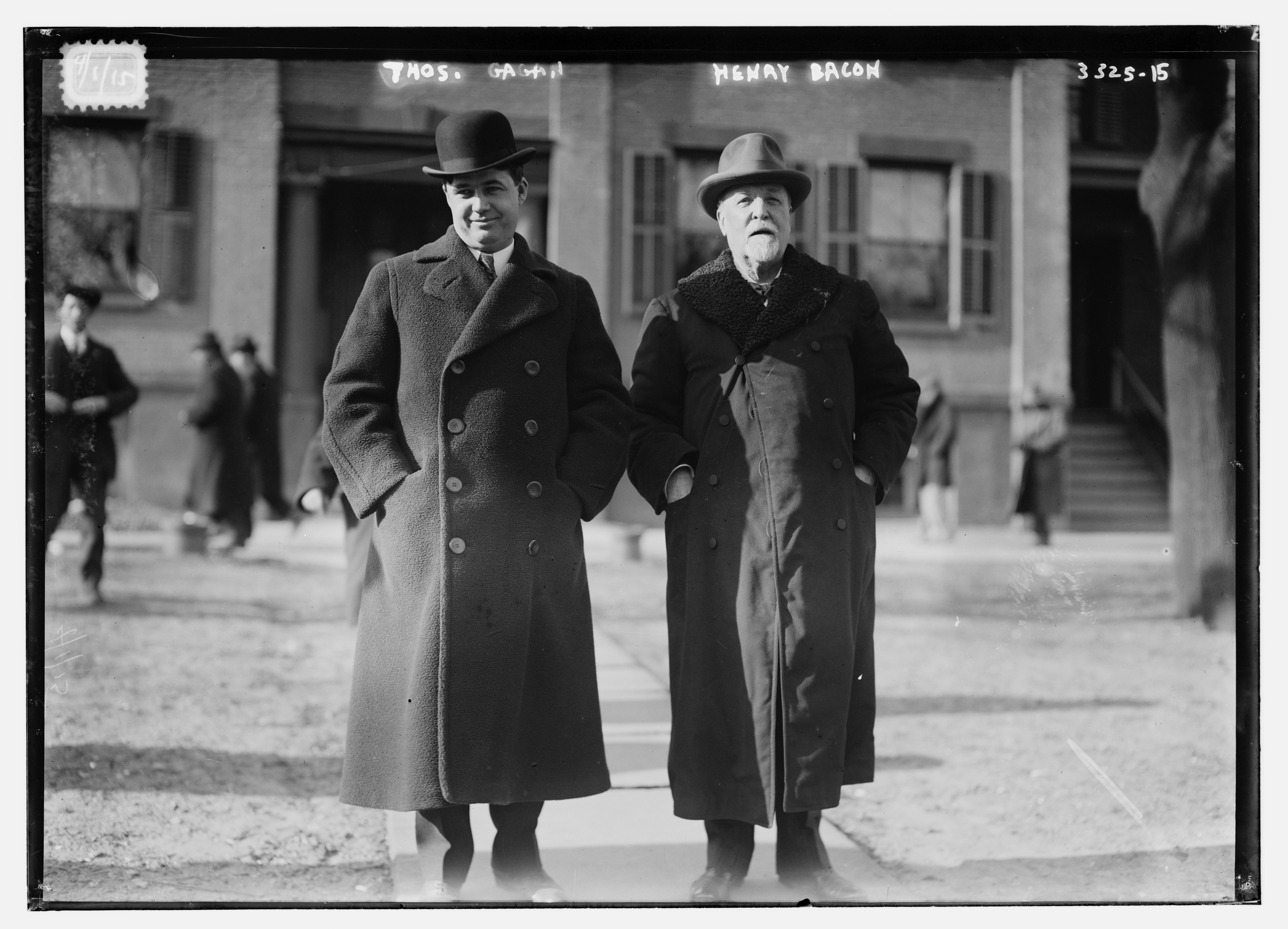
Prosecutor (D.A.) Thomas Gagan and his assistant Henry Bacon

The prosecutor, DA Thomas Gagan, presented such an inept prosecution that he seems to have been in fact working for Cleary. He failed to prevent the jury from being packed with Cleary's supporters, he allowed unfounded accusations against the victim's character to go unchallenged, and he failed to call certain witnesses who would have refuted Cleary's claim of temporary insanity. It was reported that when the verdict was announced, the spectators in the courtroom, Cleary supporters all, cheered loudly and threw hats into the air. The judge, Joseph Morschauser, publicly condemned the verdict.

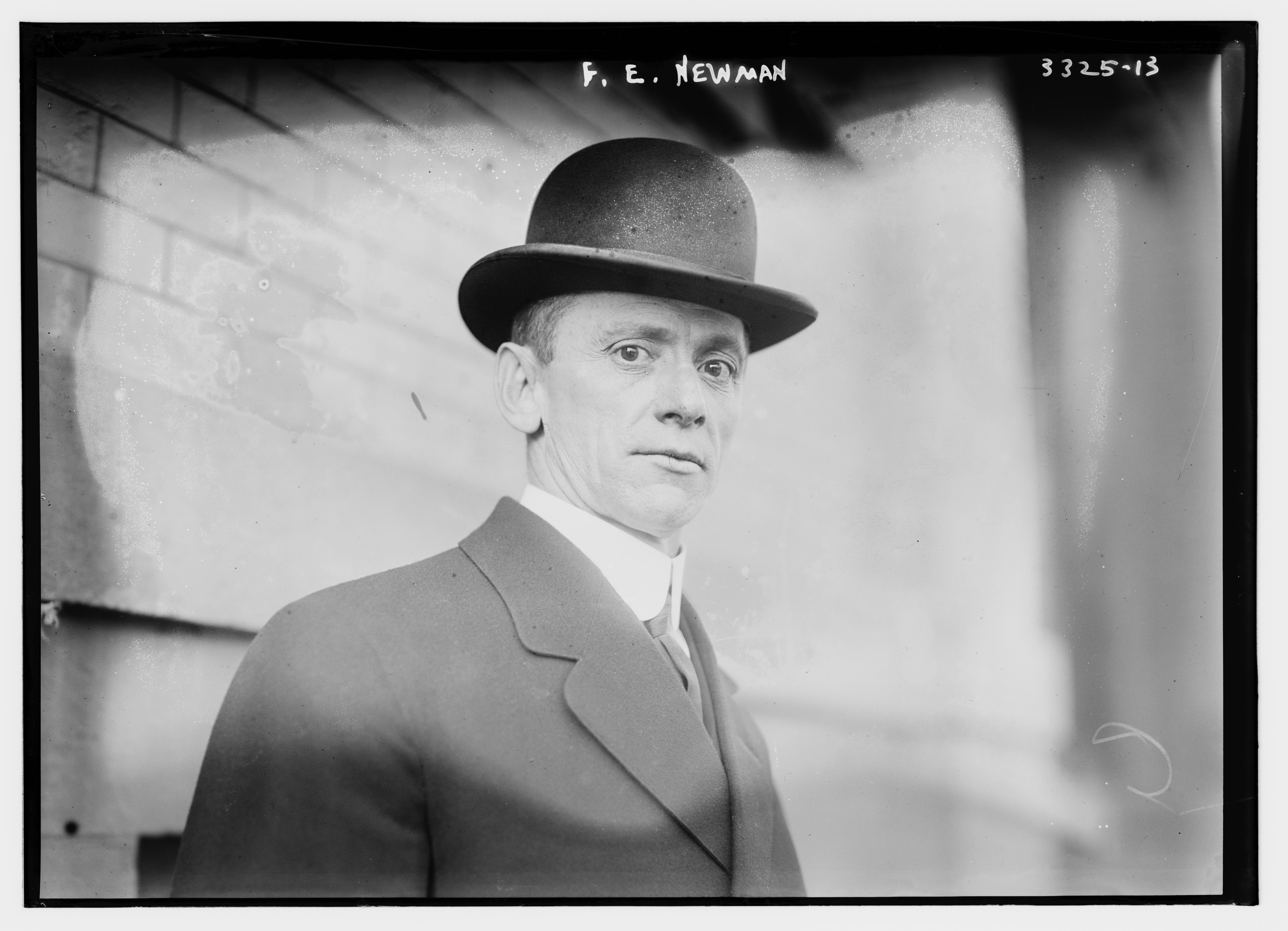
Fred Newman, Eugene's father

Newman's father, the newspaper publisher Fred Newman, organized a petition drive to have the trial investigated by the office of New York Governor Charles S. Whitman. The investigation turned up numerous failures and irregularities. It was said, regarding Gagan's failure to counter the defense's slandering of the victim, that "no more effort was made to show that this boy was a good boy than if a dog had been shot down." It also was said, regarding the attempts of potential anti-Cleary witnesses to be heard, that "it was dangerous to talk too much in Haverstraw."

After the investigation, Cleary was driven from office for financial malfeasance. He spent 2½ years in Sing Sing and Comstock prisons for fraud, then ran a tailor shop in Brooklyn. Fred Newman died penniless in Brooklyn in 1925, after a fruitless quest to obtain a retrial of Cleary on the murder charge. Gagan's political career sank into oblivion, along with the rest of the Cleary machine.

Cleary's violent disapproval of Newman may be partly attributed to the fact that Fred Newman's newspaper, the Rockland County Messenger, changed from Democratic to Republican in 1906. There may have been serious political conflicts between Cleary and Newman. In January, 1906, there had been a severe landslide, caused by over-digging of clay deposits at the banks of the Hudson River by the Haverstraw brickmaking industry. The brickyard owners were accused of negligence, and several lawsuits were filed. It is probable that Newman's Republican Messenger sided with the accusers against the brickyard owners, who were supported by the Democrat Cleary. (This was the Progressive Era in American politics, when Republicans such as Theodore Roosevelt were pressing strongly for reforms of rapacious big business practices.)
