= Stony Point (CDP), New York =

Stony Point, New York
- Census-designated place
- Location in Rockland County and the state of New York.

- Location within the state of New York
- Coordinates: 41°13′35″N 73°59′35″W
- Country: United States
- State: New York
- County: Rockland
- Towns: Stony Point and Haverstraw

Area
  - Total: 7.19 sq mi (18.62 km^{2})
  - Land: 5.89 sq mi (15.25 km^{2})
  - Water: 1.30 sq mi (3.37 km^{2})
- Elevation: 118 ft (36 m)

Population (2020)
  - Total: 12,126
  - Density: 2,059.7/sq mi (795.26/km^{2})
- Time zone: UTC-5 (Eastern (EST))
  - Summer (DST): UTC-4 (EDT)
- ZIP code: 10980
- Area code: 845
- FIPS code: 36-71663
- GNIS feature ID: 0966589

Stony Point is a hamlet and census-designated place in the town of Stony Point, Rockland County, New York, United States. A small portion of the census-designated place is located within the town of Haverstraw. It is located north of West Haverstraw, east of Harriman State Park, south of Tomkins Cove, and west of the Hudson River. The population was 12,147 at the 2010 census.

The community is in the eastern part of the town of Stony Point.

== Geography ==
Stony Point is located at 41°13′34″N 73°59′34″W (41.226361, -73.99293).

According to the United States Census Bureau, the CDP has a total area of 6.8 square miles (18 km^{2}), of which 5.5 square miles (14 km^{2}) is land and 1.3 square miles (3.4 km^{2}), or 18.64%, is water.

Stony Point is home to Camp Bullowa, a 316.7-acre (1.282 km^{2}) Boy Scout camp.

== Demographics ==
Historical population
Census	Pop.	Note	%±
2020	12,126		—
U.S. Decennial Census

As of the census of 2000, there were 11,744 people, 3,991 households, and 3,160 families residing in the CDP. The population density was 2,134.8 inhabitants per square mile (824.3/km^{2}). There were 4,074 housing units at an average density of 740.6 per square mile (285.9/km^{2}). The racial makeup of the CDP was 94.25% White, 1.37% Black or African American, 0.14% Native American, 1.39% Asian, 0.03% Pacific Islander, 1.61% from other races, and 1.22% from two or more races. Hispanic or Latino of any race were 7.06% of the population.

There were 3,991 households, out of which 38.1% had children under the age of 18 living with them, 66.1% were married couples living together, 9.6% had a female householder with no husband present, and 20.8% were non-families. 17.4% of all households were made up of individuals, and 8.5% had someone living alone who was 65 years of age or older. The average household size was 2.91 and the average family size was 3.31.

In the CDP, the population was spread out, with 25.9% under the age of 18, 6.6% from 18 to 24, 30.2% from 25 to 44, 25.1% from 45 to 64, and 12.3% who were 65 years of age or older. The median age was 38 years. For every 100 females, there were 98.4 males. For every 100 females age 18 and over, there were 94.0 males.

The median income for a household in the CDP was $71,017, and the median income for a family was $82,124. Males had a median income of $55,014 versus $35,974 for females. The per capita income for the CDP was $27,975. About 1.9% of families and 3.6% of the population were below the poverty line, including 2.7% of those under age 18 and 10.3% of those age 65 or over.
