= Thiells, New York =

- Census-designated place
- Location in Rockland County and the state of New York.

- Location within the state of New York
- Coordinates: 41°12′27″N 74°0′25″W
- Country: United States
- State: New York
- County: Rockland
- Town: Haverstraw

Area
  - Total: 1.85 sq mi (4.79 km^{2})
  - Land: 1.81 sq mi (4.70 km^{2})
  - Water: 0.031 sq mi (0.08 km^{2})
- Elevation: 276 ft (84 m)

Population (2020)
  - Total: 5,240
  - Density: 2,886.2/sq mi (1,114.37/km^{2})
- Time zone: UTC−5 (Eastern (EST))
  - Summer (DST): UTC−4 (EDT)
- ZIP Code: 10984
- Area code: 845
- FIPS code: 36-73583
- GNIS feature ID: 0967361

Thiells, known as Thiell's Corner in the 1850s, is a hamlet and census-designated place (CDP) in the town of Haverstraw, Rockland County, New York, United States. It is located north of Mount Ivy, east of Pomona, south of Tomkins Cove, and west of Garnerville. The population was 5,240 as of the 2020 census.

During the American Revolution, Thiells was known as Haverstraw Forge, where General "Mad" Anthony Wayne, leading 1,350 Continental Army troops, was able to watch the area of Stony Point.

== Geography ==
Thiells is located at 41°12′27″N 74°0′25″W (41.207392, −74.006829).

According to the United States Census Bureau, the CDP has a total area of 1.9 square miles (4.9 km^{2}), of which 1.9 square miles (4.9 km^{2}) is land and 0.53% is water.

Thiells is located on U.S. Route 202 between the Palisades Interstate Parkway and U.S. Route 9W and is west of the Hudson River.

== Demographics ==
Historical population
Census	Pop.	Note	%±
2000	4,758		—
2010	5,032		5.8%
2020	5,240		4.1%
U.S. Decennial Census

As of the census of 2000, there were 4,758 people, 1,503 households, and 1,300 families residing in the CDP. The population density was 2,562.2 inhabitants per square mile (989.3/km^{2}). There were 1,512 housing units at an average density of 814.2 per square mile (314.4/km^{2}). The racial makeup of the CDP was 88.10% White, 3.89% African American, 0.23% Native American, 2.82% Asian, 3.47% from other races, and 1.49% from two or more races. Hispanic or Latino of any race were 12.65% of the population.

There were 1,503 households, out of which 38.0% had children under the age of 18 living with them, 73.9% were married couples living together, 9.5% had a female householder with no husband present, and 13.5% were non-families. Of all households 10.5% were made up of individuals, and 3.9% had someone living alone who was 65 years of age or older. The average household size was 3.14 and the average family size was 3.38.

In the CDP, the population was spread out, with 24.6% under the age of 18, 8.3% from 18 to 24, 28.2% from 25 to 44, 30.5% from 45 to 64, and 8.4% who were 65 years of age or older. The median age was 38 years. For every 100 females, there were 98.7 males. For every 100 females age 18 and over, there were 95.2 males.

The median income for a household in the CDP was $79,906, and the median income for a family was $86,872. Males had a median income of $51,846 versus $35,162 for females. The per capita income for the CDP was $28,346. About 3.1% of families and 4.5% of the population were below the poverty line, including 4.8% of those under age 18 and 8.4% of those age 65 or over.

== History ==
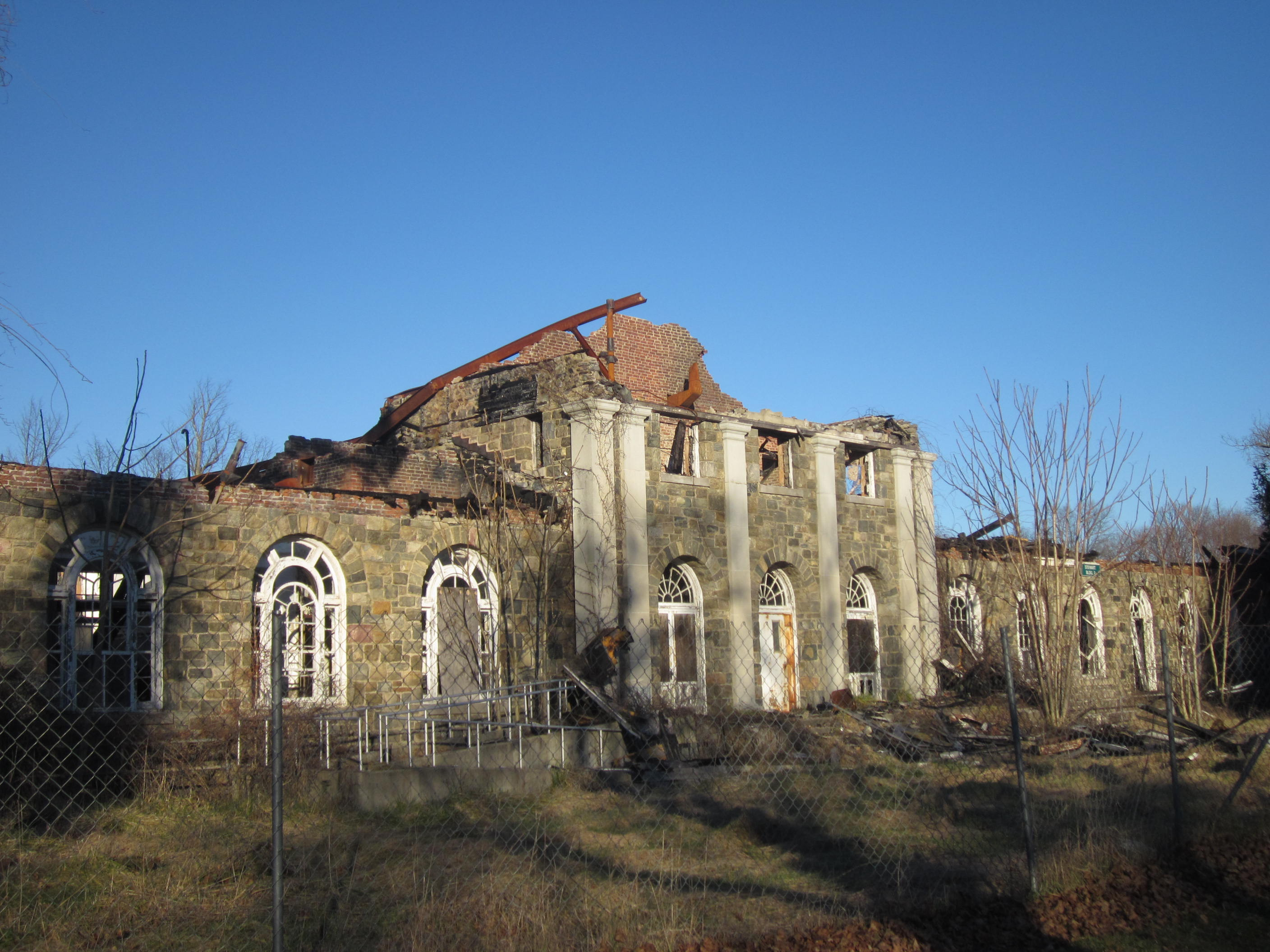
Letchworth Village

In 2009, Thiells United Methodist Church, located on Rosman Road, marked its 225th anniversary. The church originated as a mission to American Indians. It was chartered by the City Road Chapel in London in 1784. A small building was built on a piece of land which was set aside by John Thiell, although he did not attend. The building, which had been expanded, was destroyed in a fire in 1973. The congregation, soon after rebuilt, on the same spot on Rosman Road.

In 2010, the David B. Roche Volunteer Fire Company celebrated its 50th anniversary. On September 11, 2001, the company experienced tragedy when New York police officer and Thiells volunteer John Coughlin, whose name remains on the roster, died in the World Trade Center.

=== Landmarks and places of interest ===
- Thiells United Methodist Church
- Letchworth Village
- Hudson Valley Revenue Support Field Office (OPWDD)
- Minisceongo Creek

== Education ==
- North Rockland Central School District
  - In 2017 U.S. News & World Report ranked North Rockland Senior High School with a Bronze award as the 219 Best High School in New York State
  - In 2018, ranked no. 179 in Best School Districts in North Rockland by Niche.

== Notable person ==
- Paul Piperato, (June 19, 1958 - May 6, 2020) who served the County of Rockland for 30 years including fifteen years as the County Clerk. Haverstraw Bay Park was renamed Paul Piperato Haverstraw Bay Park, West Haverstraw, New York in his honor for his dedication, service and commitment to the residents of Rockland County.
