= Dunderberg Mountain =

Mountain in New York, United States

- Location within New York

Highest point
- Elevation: 1,086 ft (331 m)
- Coordinates: 41°17′08″N 73°59′11″W

Naming
- English translation: Thunder Mountain
- Language of name: Dutch

Geography
- Location: Stony Point, Rockland County, New York, U.S.
- Parent range: Hudson Highlands
- Topo map: USGS Peekskill

Climbing
- Easiest route: Hike

Dunderberg Mountain is a 1,086-foot (331 m) mountain on the west bank of the Hudson River at the southern end of the Hudson Highlands. It lies just above Jones Point, New York, within Bear Mountain State Park and the town of Stony Point in Rockland County, New York.

Dunderberg (also historically Donderberg) is a Dutch word, meaning "thunder mountain," so called by the early Dutch settlers because of the frequent thunderstorms in the vicinity.

== Geography ==
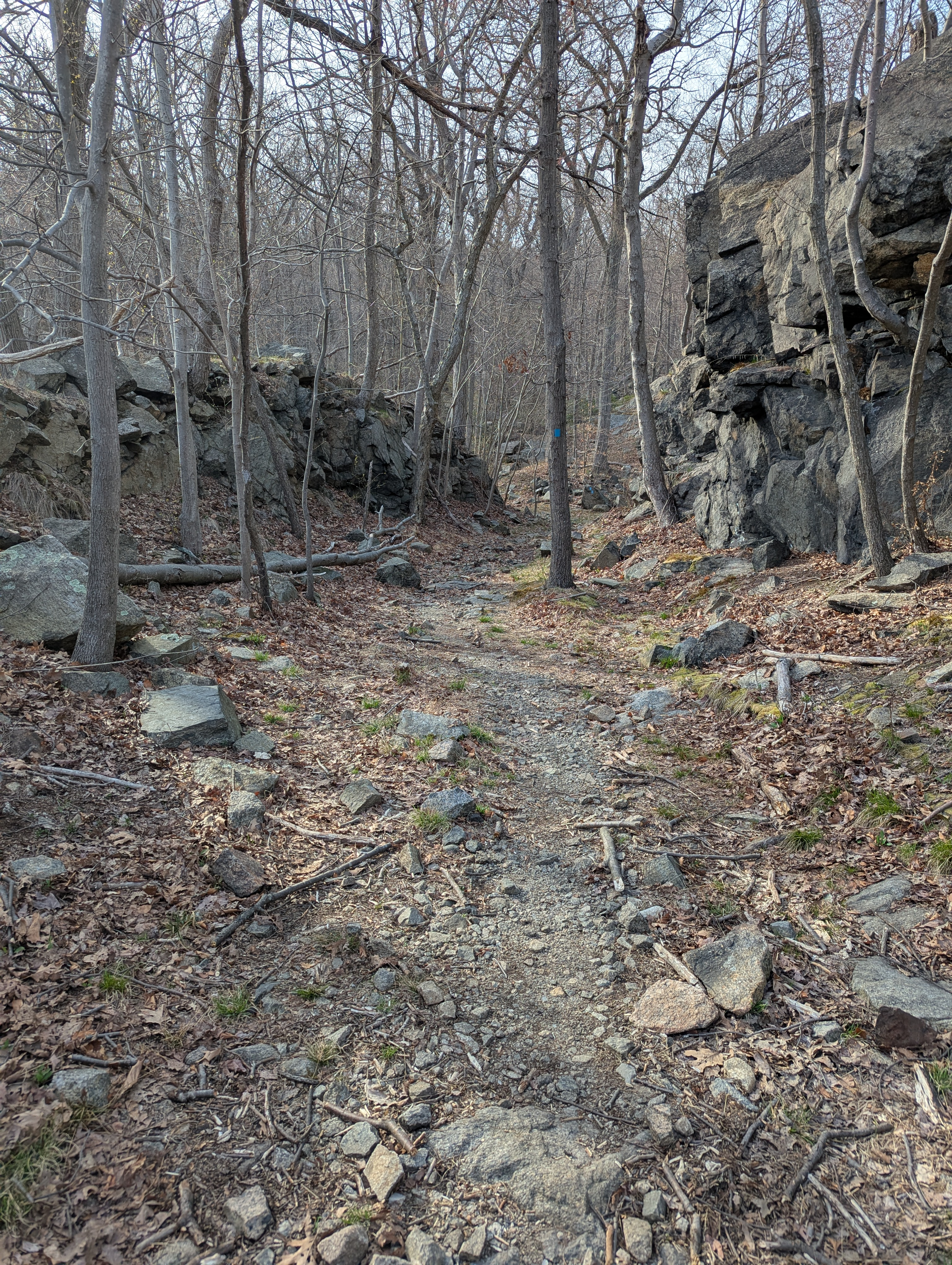
A hiking trail on Dunderberg Mountain

The bulk of Dunderberg projects into the Hudson River, which describes an arc about its eastern side. Tidal marshes of the river, Snake Hole Creek and Iona Island, lie to the north. On the northwestern side is the abandoned hamlet of Doodletown. At Dunderberg's immediate southern slope is the Hudson River, while to the southwest are outlying neighborhoods of Tomkins Cove, a community or segment of Stony Point.

The mountain as labeled on current U.S. Geological Survey (USGS) maps and a widely used hiking map, extends about a mile and a half from its easternmost footing on the river at Jones Point. But several summits lying still farther to the west and southwest are evidently part of the Dunderberg formation, or massif, as described by at least some editions of an influential area hiking guidebook. These include Bald Mountain or Bockberg (1,130 feet (340 m)), as well as the Timp (984 feet (300 m)), each of which are, however, separately named by the USGS. The Boulderberg, labeled as such on certain maps of historical interest, lies a short distance to the south of the Timp.

As Dunderberg's crest runs inland latitudinally from the river, Timp Brook splits it into northerly and southerly ridges; Bald Mountain lies at the end of the northerly ridge, while the Timp terminates the southerly ridge about two-and a half miles southwest of Jones Point. Timp Brook emerges from a small swamp between the two ridges to flow down steeply to the north around Bald Mountain and thence to the northeast, into the valley known as Doodletown Clove between West Mountain and Dunderberg.

Closely following the upper course of Timp Brook was once the main route into Doodletown from the southwest. A half-mile farther west, an old farm road, later used as a fire road and now a foot-path, also enters Doodletown valley, through a narrow gap known as Timp Pass between the Timp and West Mountain. However, since the late 19th century, the main road up the Hudson (now U.S. Route 9W) has circled around the base of Dunderberg near the river.

== History ==
=== Revolutionary War ===
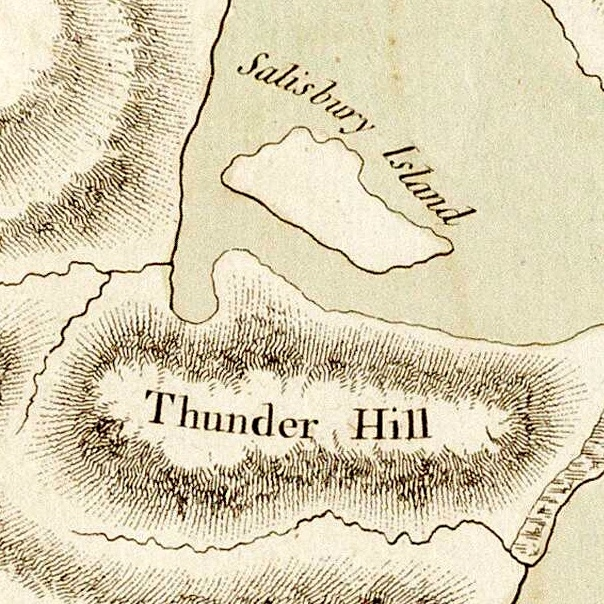
Detail of a 1777 map showing Dunderberg Mountain (labeled "Thunder Hill") just south of Salisbury Island (now known as Iona Island)

Dunderberg was a landmark for British forces during the American Revolutionary War, as troops moved over a pass to the west of the mountain while marching to attack Forts Clinton and Montgomery in 1777. In a report to General William Howe several days after the Oct. 6, 1777 attack, the British commander Sir Henry Clinton wrote that at daybreak, 2,100 troops disembarked from vessels at Stony Point:

The Avant Garde of 500 Regulars & 400 Provincials ... began its March to occupy the Pass of Thunder Hill; this Avant Garde after it had passed that Mountain, was to proceed by a detour of seven Miles round the Hill [Bear Mountain], and Debouchée in the Rear of Fort Montgomery, while General Vaughan, with 1200 Men was to continue his March towards Fort Clinton ... Major General Tryon with the Remainder, being the Rear Guard, to leave a Battalion at the Pass of Thunder Hill to open our Communication with the Fleet.

Sir Henry's "Pass of Thunder Hill" apparently stood between what is now called Bald Mountain and the Timp, about a mile southwest of the westerly summit of Dunderberg. It lies about a half-mile east of what is now called Timp Pass. The modern 1777 Trail commemorates Sir Henry's route, and was built in 1974–75 as a joint project of the Rockland County Boy Scouts, the Palisades Interstate Park, the Rockland County Cooperative Extension and the New York-New Jersey Trail Conference. The route was determined by Jack Mead of the Trailside Museum at Bear Mountain from British military records and maps drawn by Major Robert Erskine, Surveyor General of the Continental Army.

Anthony Wayne, in his successful attack on Stony Point in 1779, used a route that entirely avoids the Dunderberg area, passing nearly two miles to the west of the Timp. A contemporary trail commemorates Wayne's route and is mapped by the New York/New Jersey Trail Conference.

=== Spiral Railway Corp. ===
In 1889, the Dunderberg Spiral Railway Corporation formed with the goal of building a hotel at the top of Dunderberg. Tourists were to reach the hotel by means of a steam-powered railway. For the descent, the cars would be powered simply by gravity as the 12-mile (19 km) track wound its way back to the base of the mountain, like a roller coaster, affording scenic views of the Hudson and reaching speeds of up to 50 miles per hour (80 km/h).

Directors of the Dunderberg corporation included Henry J. Mumford, who with his brother H.L. Mumford, operated the former Mauch Chunk Railroad of similar design as a successful and well-known tourist attraction during the 1870s in what is now Jim Thorpe, Pennsylvania. The Mauch Chunk Railroad, originally designed for a coal mine, became the inspiration for modern amusement park roller coasters.

Funding for the Dunderberg project ran out in 1891 and the system was never completed; the reasons for the failure remain unclear.

One theory holds that the facility was planned as part of the Columbian Exposition of 1893. Verplanck's Point (south of Peekskill on the Hudson) is said to have been considered as a possible location during the planning stage of the Exposition, and it is possible that the funding for the hotel and the railway collapsed after Congress awarded the location to Chicago instead. Although the theory is persistent, the idea of an exposition such as that proposed being located so distant from a major city and its infrastructure is unlikely, and no clear documentation has been found to support it.

Today, ruins and some signs of the Spiral Railway construction are still visible. The graded areas can be accessed from the Ramapo-Dunderberg and the Timp-Torne trails, and became somewhat popular for walking following publication of William Howell's two volumes of hiking diaries called "The Hudson Highlands" in 1933 and 1934, and reprinted by "Walking News" in 1982.

=== Edison Mine ===
In 1890 Thomas Edison began to establish an iron mine by acquiring nearly 200 acres (0.81 km^{2}) on the north slope of Dunderberg and the base of Bald Mountain. Two years earlier, the inventor had created a method for using electromagnets to separate and refine iron ore.

The remains of Edison's mine lie southeast of Doodletown Reservoir south of the abandoned "Old Turnpike," between the Cornell Mine Trail and the Doodletown Bridle Path. A tailings pile is on the hillside. The land was eventually acquired by the Palisades Interstate Park Commission on December 31, 1938.

Other abandoned iron mines in the immediate vicinity predate Edison's project, and include those on Bald Mountain and West Mountain.

=== 9W roadway construction ===
In 1911 a 12-foot-wide (3.7 m) roadway was constructed near the base of the Dunderberg, a stretch of what became U.S. Route 9W (which paralleled U.S. Route 9 on the eastern bank of the Hudson). A wider 2.44-mile (3.93 km) so-called "upper level" section of 9W was blasted upslope into the side of Dunderberg and opened to traffic in 1931. The new project was compared in the 1930s with Storm King Highway and the southeastern approach to Bear Mountain Bridge, two other mountainside highways along the Hudson built in the same era.

For 1.5 miles (2.4 km) the new highway averaged an elevation above the river of between 200 and 300 feet (91 m). The project was undertaken because it reportedly required less excavation and backfilling than that required to widen the lower roadway to four lanes. Funds for the project had been allocated by the state in 1924. Over a period of years the road was temporarily blocked by landslides on a number of occasions.

With the opening of the upper level, the lower highway was to be widened to 20 feet (6.1 m) and carry only northbound traffic, while the upper level, also 20 feet (6.1 m) wide, would carry southbound traffic.

Today the lower roadway appears on maps as a minor secondary road labeled "Old Route 9W." More than a mile of this route is now called the Jones Point Greenway and is used solely for pedestrian and bicycle traffic. The upper roadway is three lanes and additional blasting has evidently been completed in recent years.

== Cultural references ==
- In "The Storm-Ship", Washington Irving portrayed the Dunderberg as home of a malevolent imp, calling up storms against unwary sailors on the Hudson River. "The captains of the river craft talk of a little bulbous-bottomed Dutch goblin, in trunk hose and sugar-loafed hat, with a speaking trumpet in his hand, which they say keeps about the Dunderberg."
- In the Irving story, skipper Ouselsticker, of Fishkill,—for all he had a parson on board,—was once beset by a heavy squall, and the goblin came out of the mist and sat astraddle of his bowsprit, seeming to guide his schooner straight toward the rocks. The dominie chanted the song of Saint Nicolaus, and the goblin, unable to endure either its spiritual potency or the worthy parson's singing, shot upward like a ball and rode off on the gale, carrying with him the nightcap of the parson's wife, which he hung on the weathercock of Esopus steeple, forty miles away.

Subsequent folklore apparently built on the Irving story suggests the goblin is imprisoned in Kingston's Old Dutch Church

- The New York-built, Civil War-era ironclad USS Dunderberg was named after this peak.

== See also ==
- Buckberg, a hill in the Hudson Highlands that played a role in American Revolutionary War
- Popolopen, a name of several related landmarks in the Hudson Highlands
