= Stony Point Light =

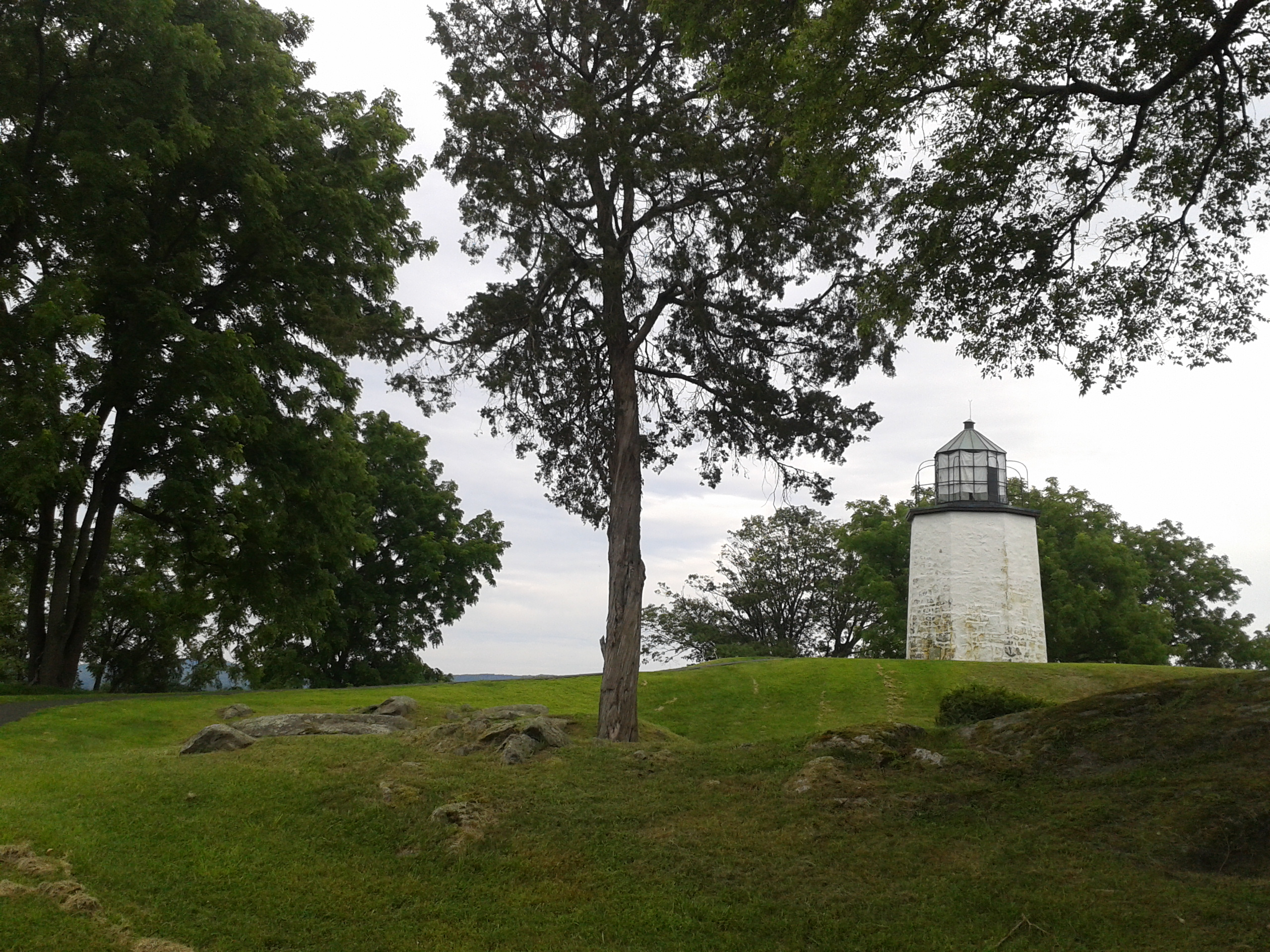
- Stony Point Light seen from the remains of the British fort
- Location: Stony Point Battlefield, Stony Point, New York
- Coordinates: 41°14′29″N 73°58′20″W

Tower
- Constructed: 1826
- Foundation: Surface Rock
- Construction: Fieldstone
- Automated: 1973
- Height: 30 feet (9.1 m)
- Shape: Octagonal
- Markings: White w/ Black Lantern
- Heritage: National Register of Historic Places listed place

Light
- First lit: 1826
- Deactivated: 1925-1995
- Focal height: 58 feet (18 m)
- Lens: 8 patent lamps, 12-inch (300 mm) reflectors (original), Fourth order Fresnel lens on loan from USCG and Hudson River Maritime Museum (current)
- Characteristic: Fl W 4s - Flashing White 4 seconds
- Stony Point Lighthouse
- U.S. National Register of Historic Places
- Area: less than one acre
- Built: 1825
- MPS: Hudson River Lighthouses TR
- NRHP reference No.: 79001626
- Added to NRHP: May 29, 1979

The Stony Point Light is the oldest lighthouse on the Hudson River. It is located at the Stony Point Battlefield in Stony Point, New York.

The lighthouse was built in 1826 by Thomas Phillips, to warn ships away from the rocks of the Stony Point peninsula. The completion of the Erie Canal the previous year, which linked New York City to America's heartland, increased traffic on the Hudson River dramatically, and the need for navigational aids was paramount.

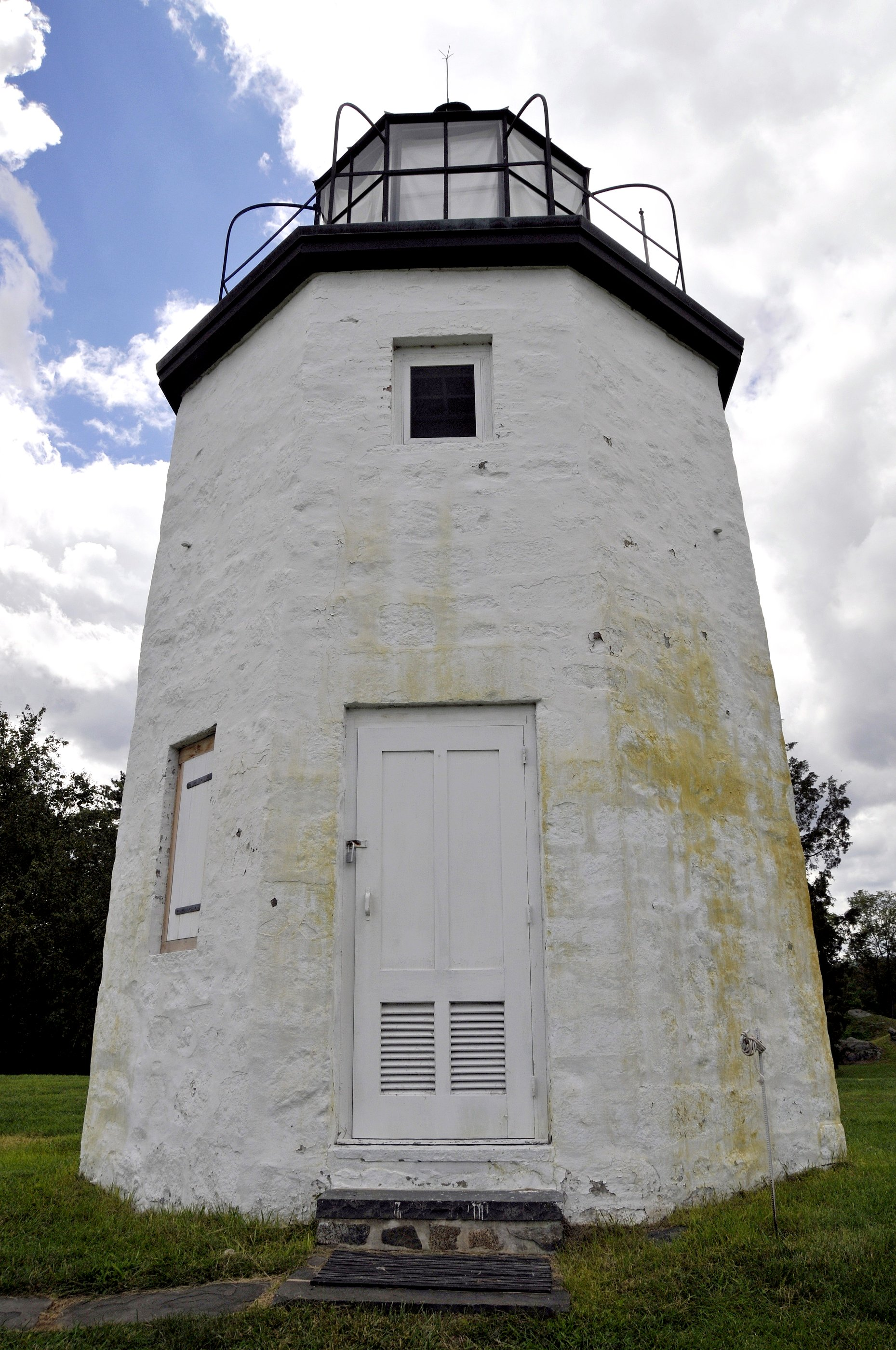
Close-up view of the lighthouse

Its design is an octagonal pyramid, made entirely of stone. In service for nearly 100 years, the lighthouse had a series of keepers, most notably the Rose family. The Rose home is also on the Historic Register.

The lighthouse was decommissioned in 1925 and was acquired by the parks commission in 1941. It was added to the National Register of Historic Places in 1979.

Through the efforts of the Stony Point Battlefield State Historic Site, the Palisades Park Interstate Commission, and NYS Office of Parks, Recreation, and Historic Preservation, restoration of the lighthouse began in 1986. The exterior was repaired and painted and the lantern was reglazed. On October 7, 1995, restoration was complete, and the light was activated for the first time in 70 years. The automatic light, operated by solar power, beams a flash of light once every four seconds. It is open to the public.

Stony Point Light is shown on the NOAA Chart 12343
