= Stony Point Battlefield =

Coordinates: 41.241449°N 73.973522°W

- U.S. National Register of Historic Places
- U.S. National Historic Landmark
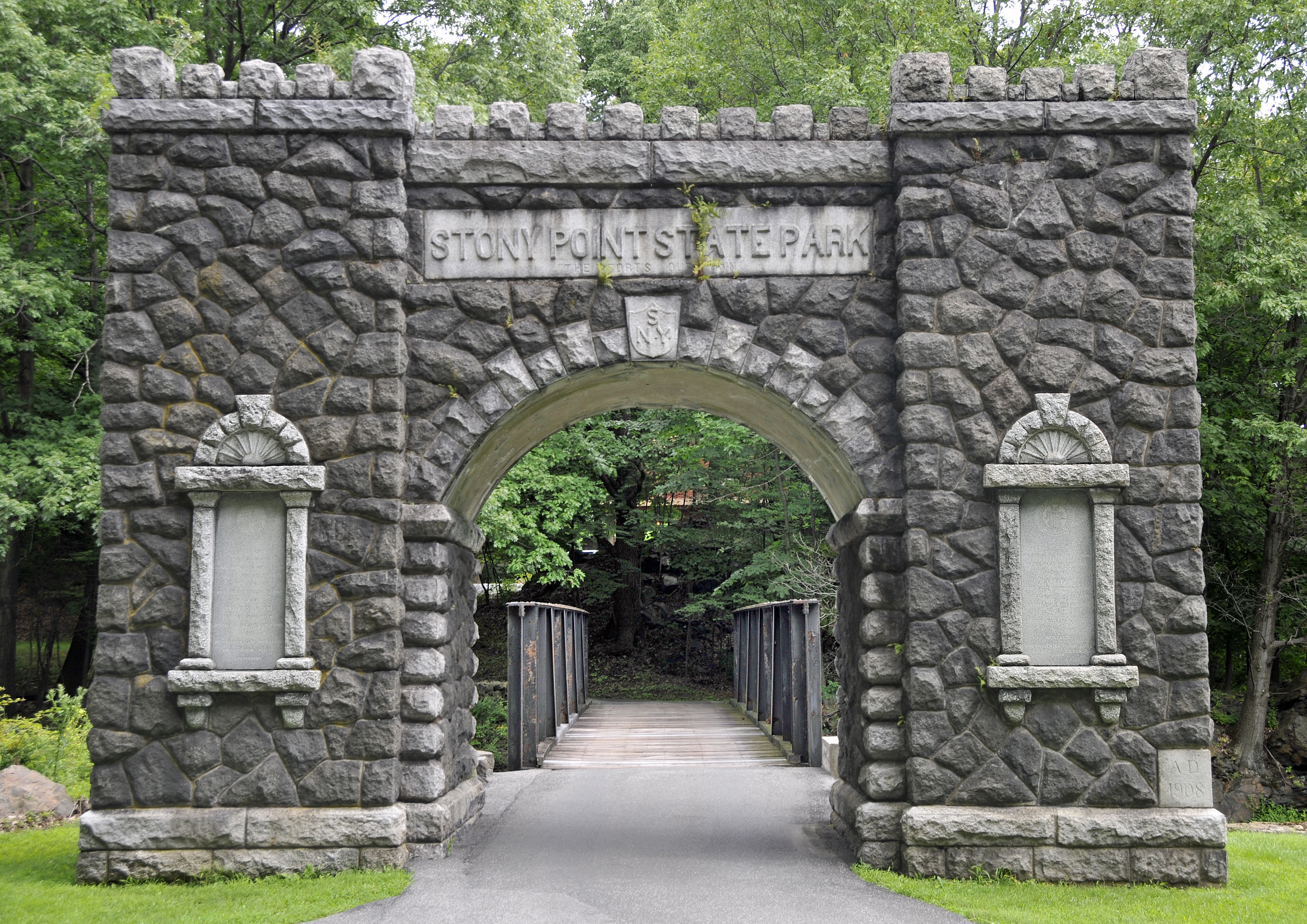
- Entrance to the site of Stony Point Battlefield.
- Nearest city: Stony Point, New York
- Built: 1779
- NRHP reference No.: 66000567

Significant dates
- Added to NRHP: October 15, 1966
- Designated NHL: January 20, 1961

Stony Point Battlefield is a historic site in Rockland County, New York; the location of the 1779 Battle of Stony Point during the American Revolutionary War. It is a National Historic Landmark and has a museum.

== History ==
The site was purchased and preserved in the late 1890s, and opened to the public in 1902.

A flying stunt was flown during the July 16, 1929 sesquicentennial of the Stony Point Battlefield, in front of a crowd of over 8,000 dignitaries. A number of traditional military units were on display, including the US Horse Artillery, the First Troop, Philadelphia City Cavalry and various infantry army and National Guard units. In comparison to these 18th and 19th century horse and foot-transportation methods, "A modern feature was the flying over the battlefield during the exercises, of an airplane piloted by Mrs. Opal Kunz, who dropped an American flag." "During the ceremonies, Mrs. Kunz flew alone from the Newark, NJ Airport, in her airplane, the 'Betsy Ross' over Stony Point, and from an altitude of 1,000 feet dropped several hundred small American flags, and also a larger one, weighted, which fell upon the battlefield."

A museum was built on the site in 1936, and in the 1940s the Palisades Interstate Park Commission took over administration of the battlefield and began to acquire more of the surrounding area.

It was declared a National Historic Landmark in 1961.

The Stony Point Battlefield along with DeWint House in Tappan and Blauvelt House in New City are the only places in Rockland County designated as New York State "Paths through History" sites.

By the 1980s, the park encompassed all public land on the peninsula, including the historic Stony Point Lighthouse, built in 1826.

The site is now operated as Stony Point Battlefield State Historic Site, and includes the museum with exhibits about the battle and the lighthouse. The park offers interpretive programs including 18th century military life, cannon and musket firings, cooking demonstrations, nature walks, guided tours of the battlefield, and children's activities.

Artist Lee Woodward Zeigler worked for the Federal Emergency Relief Administration (FERA) and painted two murals c.1936 at the Stony Point Battlefield museum in Stony Point, New York, one of which features George Washington and Anthony Wayne planning their attack from nearby Buckberg Mountain.

The park is open Wednesday through Saturday from 10 a.m. to 5 p.m., and Sundays from 1 p.m. to 5 p.m. It is accessible from U.S. Route 9W just north of the Village of Stony Point.

== See also ==
- List of National Historic Landmarks in New York
- List of New York State Historic Sites
