= Iona Island (New York) =

Island of the Hudson River in the town of Stony Point, New York

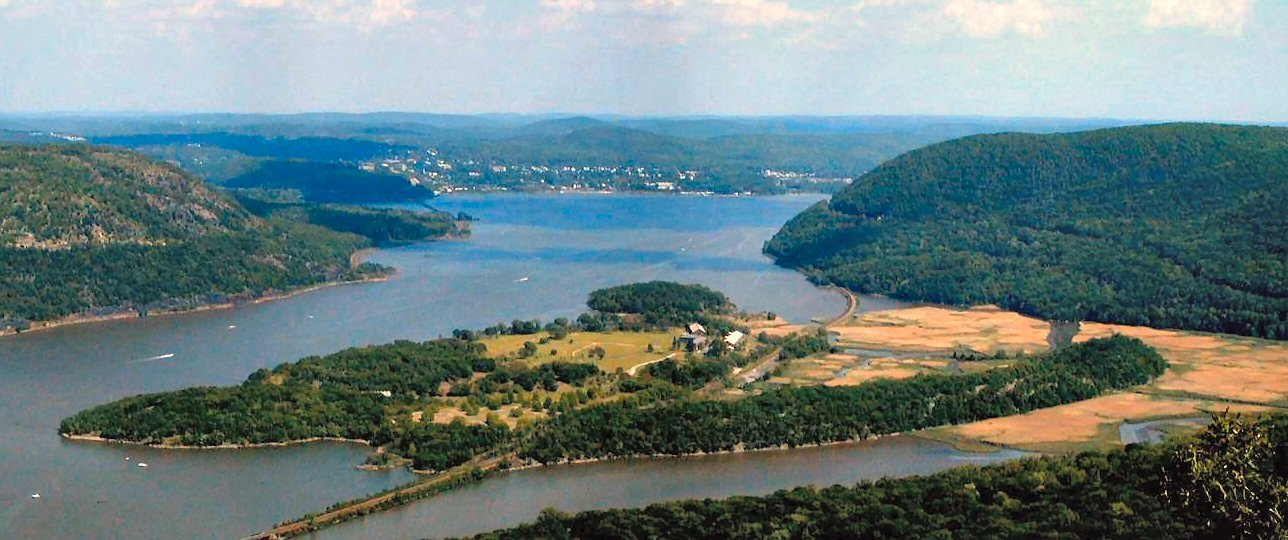
- View of Iona Island from atop Bear Mountain

- Location within New York

Geography
- Location: Hudson River
- Coordinates: 41°18′14″N 73°58′38″W
- Area: 556 acres (225 ha)
- Highest elevation: 72 ft (21.9 m)

Administration
- United States
- State: New York
- County: Rockland County
- Town: Stony Point
- Owner: Palisades Interstate Park Commission; New York State Office of Parks, Recreation and Historic Preservation

U.S. National Natural Landmark
- Designated: 1974

Iona Island is a 556-acre (2.25 km^{2}) island of the Hudson River in the town of Stony Point, New York, on its west bank. The island is located approximately one mile (1.6 km) south of the Bear Mountain Bridge and is separated from the Hudson's western shore by mudflats and freshwater tidal marshes. It is part of Bear Mountain State Park, although it is occasionally listed separately as Iona Island State Park. From 1899 to 1947 the island was used as the Naval Ammunition Depot Iona Island.

The island and its adjacent marsh were designated a National Natural Landmark in May 1974, and it is part of the Hudson River National Estuarine Research Reserve. It serves mainly as a bird sanctuary, particularly known as a winter nesting place for bald eagles.

== Geography ==
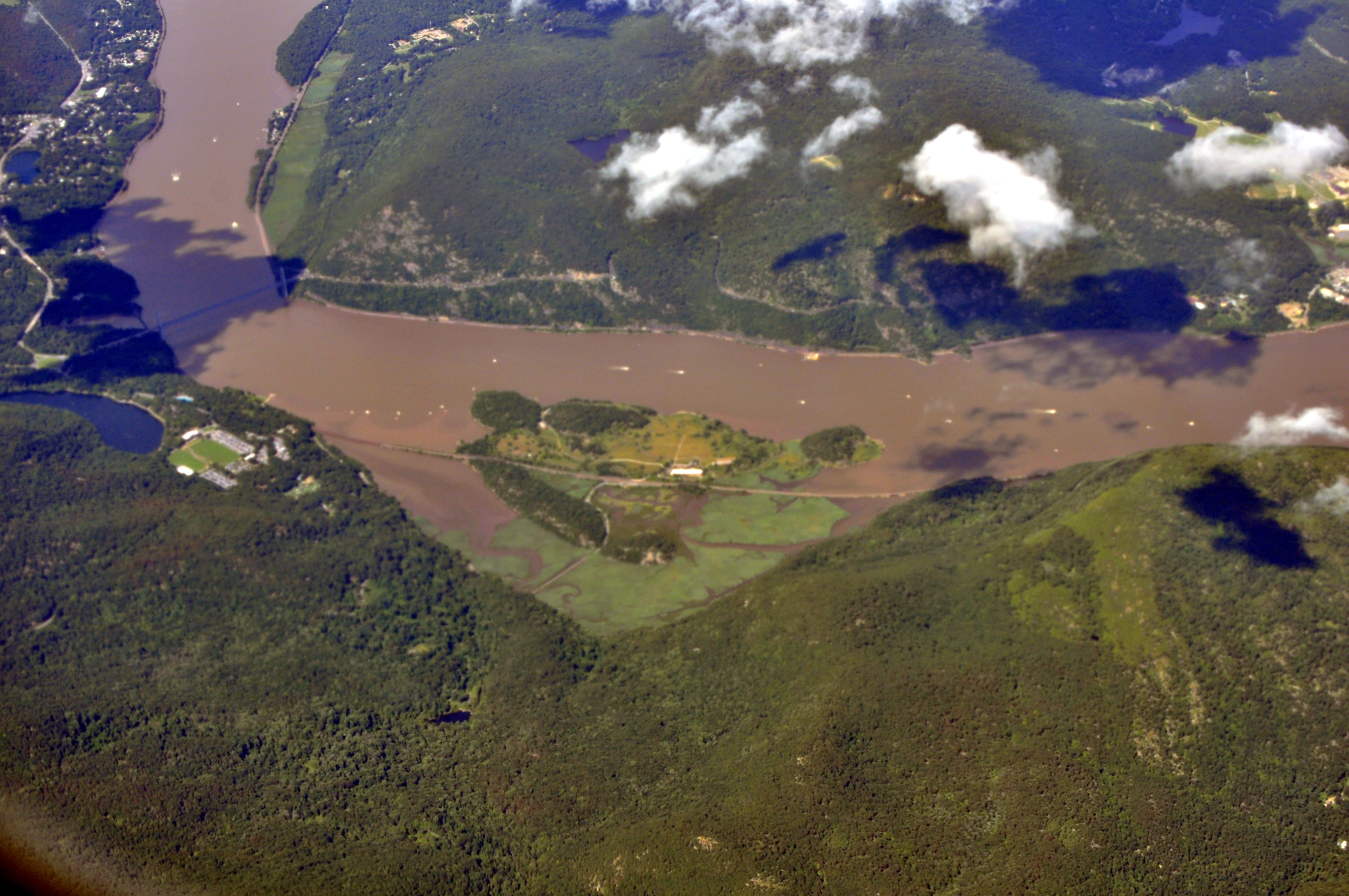
Aerial view of Iona Island in the brown waters of the Hudson, looking northeast

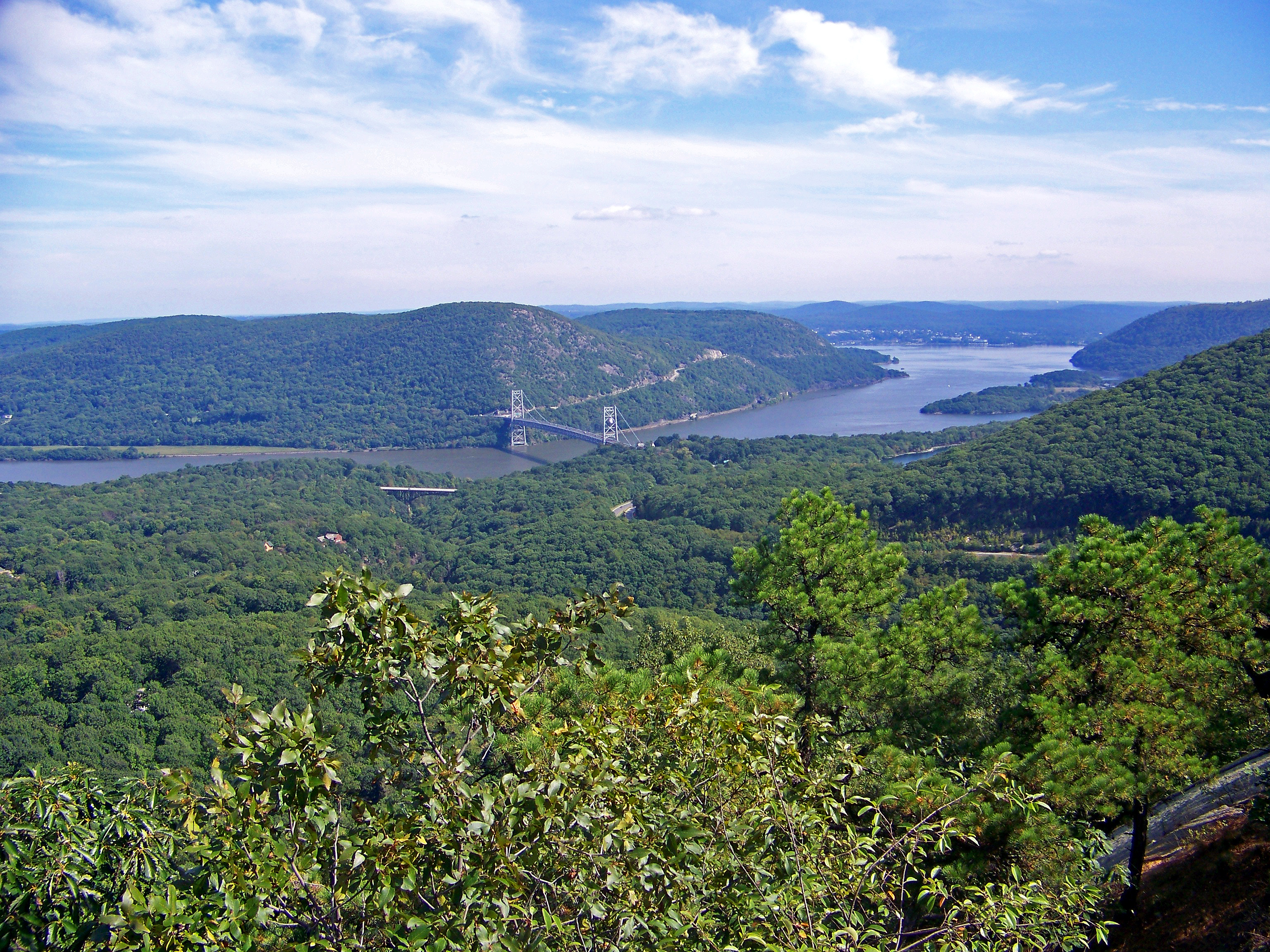
View of Iona Island (partially obscured, upper right) from Popolopen Torne

Iona Island is transected by active River Subdivision (CSX Transportation) railroad tracks, but is accessible to the public only by a causeway connecting it to U.S. Route 9W in Bear Mountain State Park, near Doodletown. It is maintained by the Palisades Interstate Park Commission.

The southeastern part of the island, once cut off by marshes, is known as Round Island. It was attached to the south end of bedrock Iona Island with fill in the early 20th century. The hill on the western side, south of the causeway, was also once treated as separate, and referred to as Courtland Island. Snake Hole Creek originates in the low marshes towards the center of the island and flows southwesterly, then turning to the southeast and finally east in a long crescent to reach the Hudson. It separates the marshes of Salisbury Meadow, on the west side, from Ring Meadow, on the east side.

== History ==
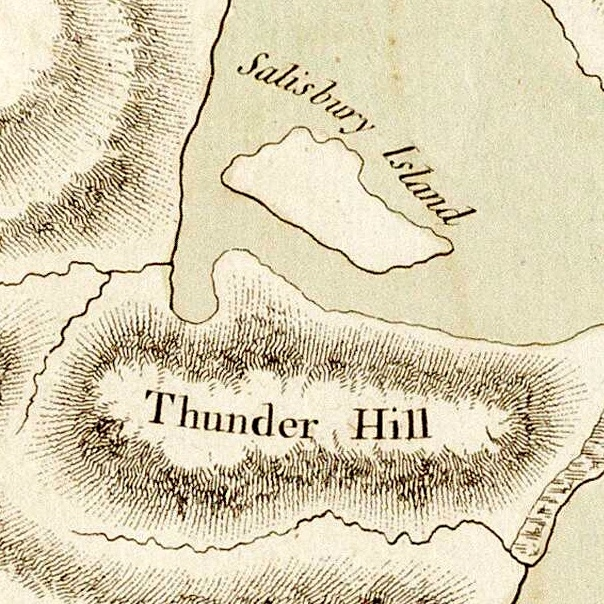
Detail of a 1777 map showing Iona Island (labeled "Salisbury Island") just north of Dunderberg Mountain (labeled "Thunder Hill")

Native Americans spent the summers fishing from the island's shores, and named the island Wa-na-ka-wagh-kin, which has been translated as meaning "good land". Artifacts excavated on Iona Island are on display at the Bear Mountain Trailside Museum and Zoo. In 1683, members of the Van Cortlandt family purchased the land from the natives. It was originally known as Salisbury Island, and later as Weyant's Island (for the local Weyant or Weiant family). The island has also been known as Beveridge's Island. It was occupied by British troops during the American Revolution.

In 1847, it was bought by John Beveridge for Dr. E. W. Grant, his son-in-law, who renamed it Iona Island and planted it with Iona grapes and fruit trees. Grant supplied the Union army with produce during the Civil War. In 1868, his creditors foreclosed on the island.

The island was purchased by a group of investors, and a summer resort was developed on the island. Grant's mansion home became a hotel, and the investors gradually added an amusement park with a carousel, Ferris wheel, dance floor, pavilion, and picnic grounds. It also had a dock to accommodate steamboats which brought pleasure-seekers up from New York City and New Jersey. The construction of the West Shore Railroad across the island in 1882 made it even more accessible to tourists.

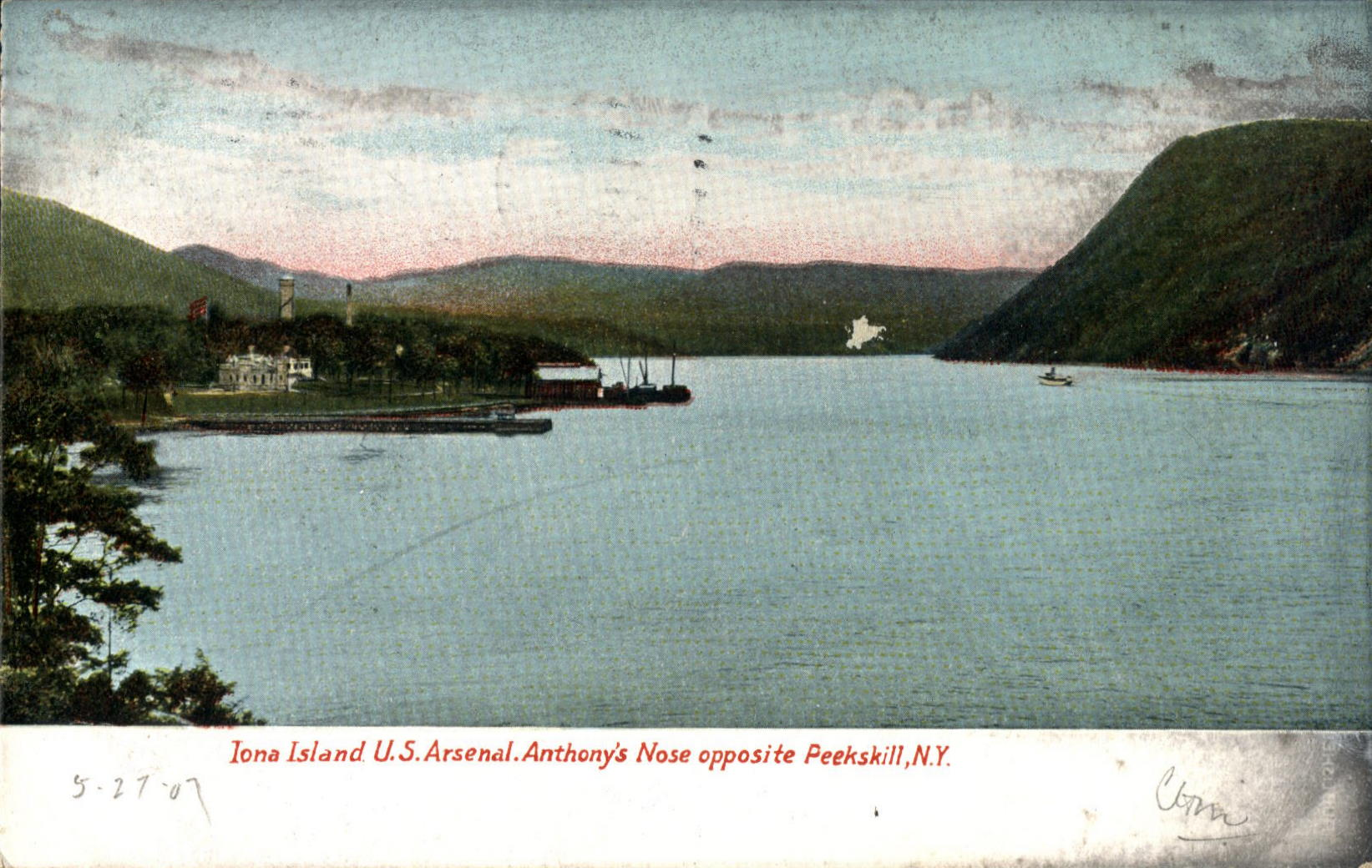
The naval facility on Iona Island

In 1899, the island was bought by the U.S. Navy for use as a naval ammunition depot, becoming one of the largest ammunition facilities in the nation, at that time. On November 4, 1903, an explosion at the site killed six workers, and blew out windows across the river in Peekskill, three miles away. The explosion occurred while men were drawing the explosive charges from a consignment of old shells recently arrived from the battleship Massachusetts.

The depot supplied much of the munitions for both World War I and II, and remained in service until 1947. Approximately five of the original 164 arsenal buildings remain, which the park now uses for storage. Following World War II until the early 70s, the famous "mothball fleet" of decommissioned warships were moored near the island at Tomkins Cove.

The island was bought by the Palisades Interstate Park Commission in 1965. In 1974 it was named a National Natural Landmark by the National Park Service. As an active wildlife sanctuary, Iona Island is open to the public via a causeway off Route 9W. The island and its wildlife may be viewed from overlooks on nearby Route 6, as well as from overlooks within Bear Mountain State Park. Although public canoeing and kayaking is prohibited in the marsh itself, free guided canoeing programs to the marsh are offered during the summer. However, the waterway around the marsh are affected by tides and hence are "navigable-in-law" by the public.

== Wildlife ==
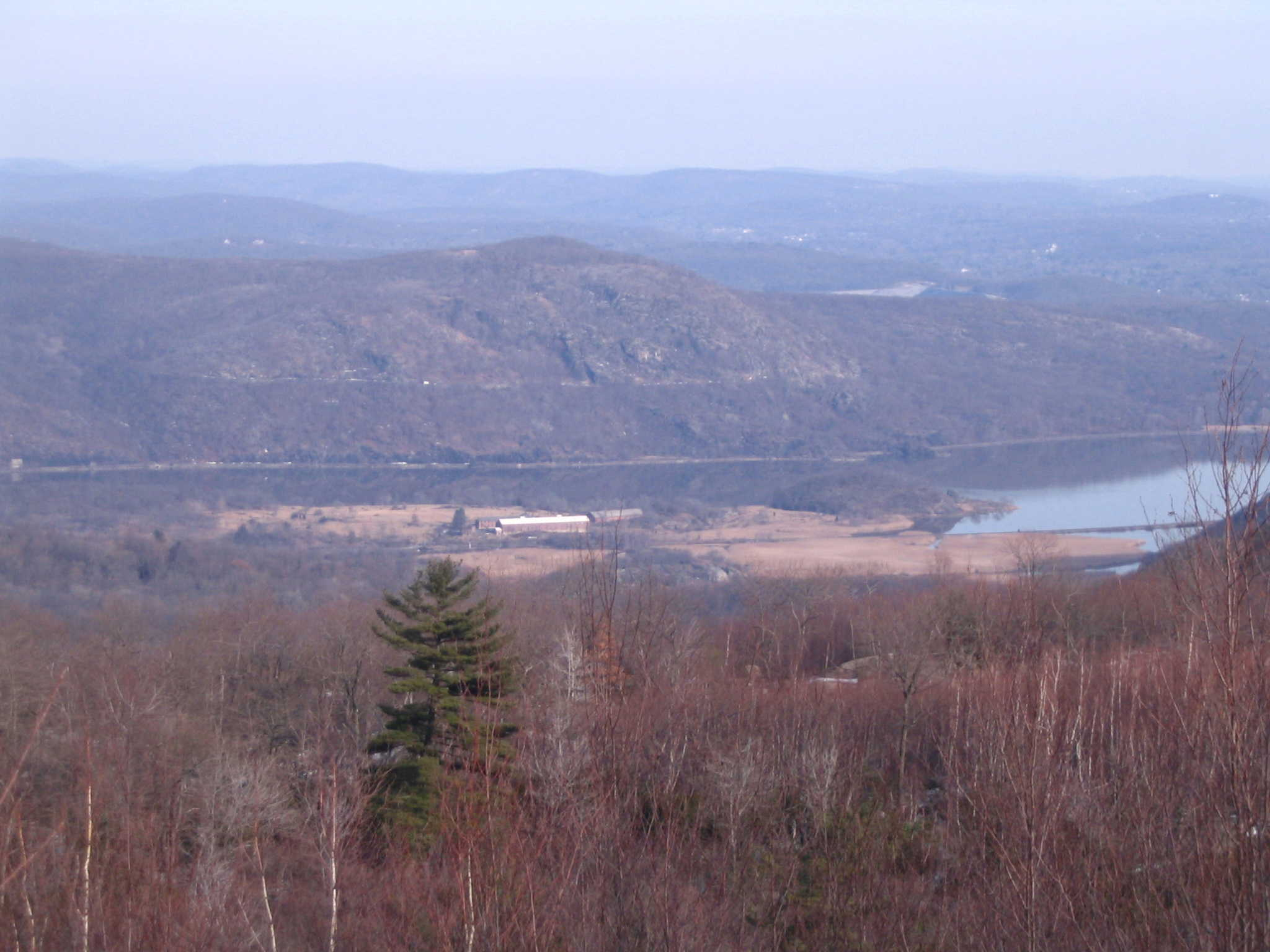
Iona Island as seen from West Mountain

The island was the subject of a bioblitz sponsored by the New York State Museum and the New York State Biodiversity Research Institute in September 2000.

=== List of identified bird species ===
- American bittern
- American kestrel
- Barn swallow
- Belted kingfisher
- Bobolink
- Canada goose
- Cliff swallow
- Eastern bluebird
- Eastern kingbird
- Field sparrow
- Least bittern
- Mute swan
- Marsh wren
- Northern harrier
- Osprey
- Pied-billed grebe
- Prairie warbler
- Red-tailed hawk
- Red-winged blackbird
- Song sparrow
- Virginia rail
- Warbling vireo
- Wood duck

== See also ==
- List of New York state parks
- List of National Natural Landmarks in New York
