= Stony Point District School No. 4 =

- U.S. National Register of Historic Places
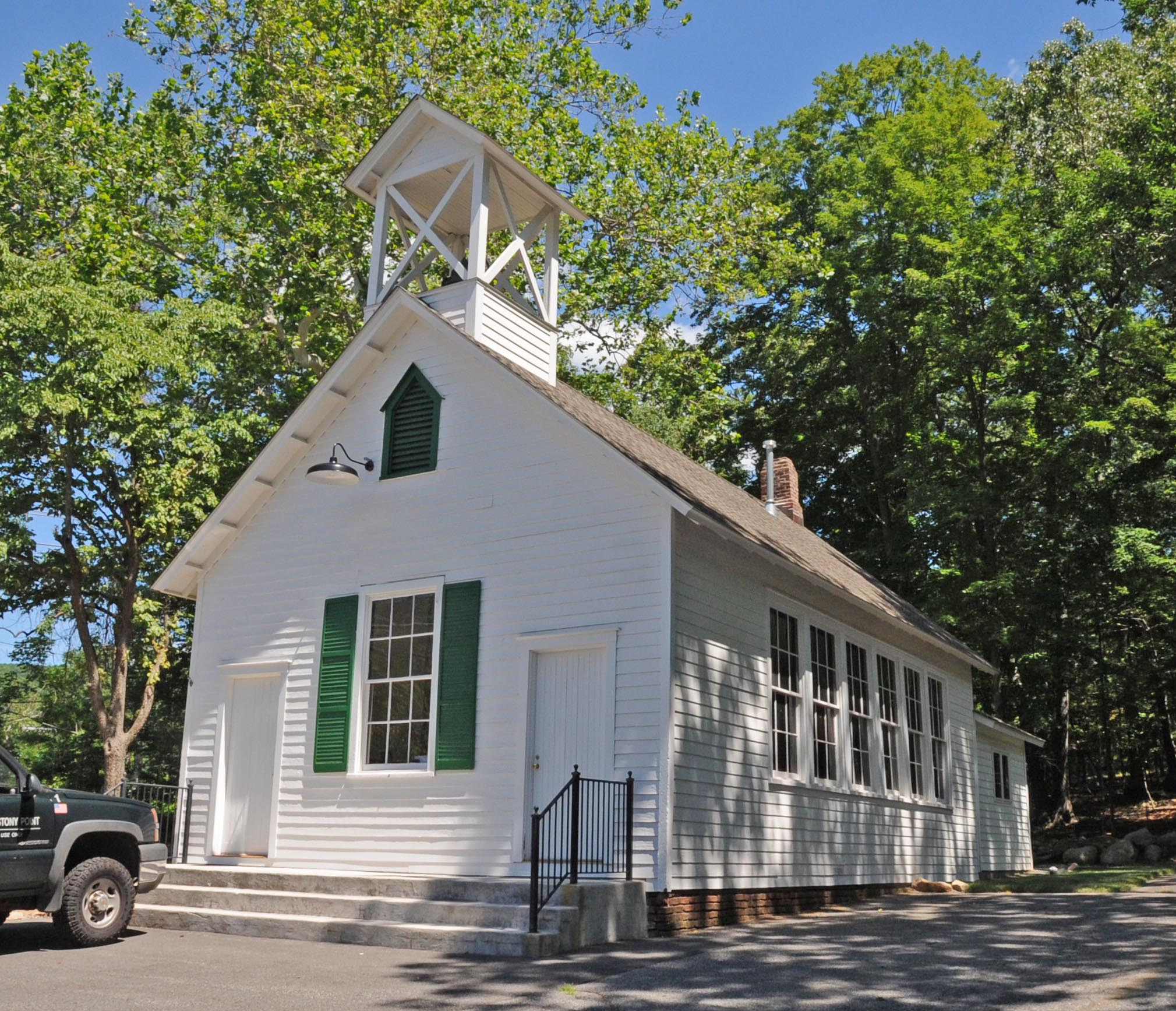

- Location within New York Location within the United States
- Location: Central Dr. at Cedar Flats Rd., near Stony Point, New York
- Coordinates: 41°14′16″N 74°01′17″W
- Area: 0.46 acres (0.19 ha)
- Built: c. 1915
- Architectural style: Gothic
- NRHP reference No.: 11001005
- Added to NRHP: January 4, 2012

Stony Point District School No. 4, also known as the Pyngyp School, is a historic one-room school building located near Stony Point in Rockland County, New York. It was built about 1915, and is a one-story, rectangular wood-frame building with modest Gothic style detailing. It has a steeply pitched gable roof topped by belfry and two entry doors. A rear frame addition was constructed in the 1970s. The school closed in 1945, after which it was used as a community center.

It was listed on the National Register of Historic Places in 2012.
