= Doodletown, New York =

Isolated settlement in New York State, US

Coordinates: 41°17′47.8874″N 73°59′41.1″W

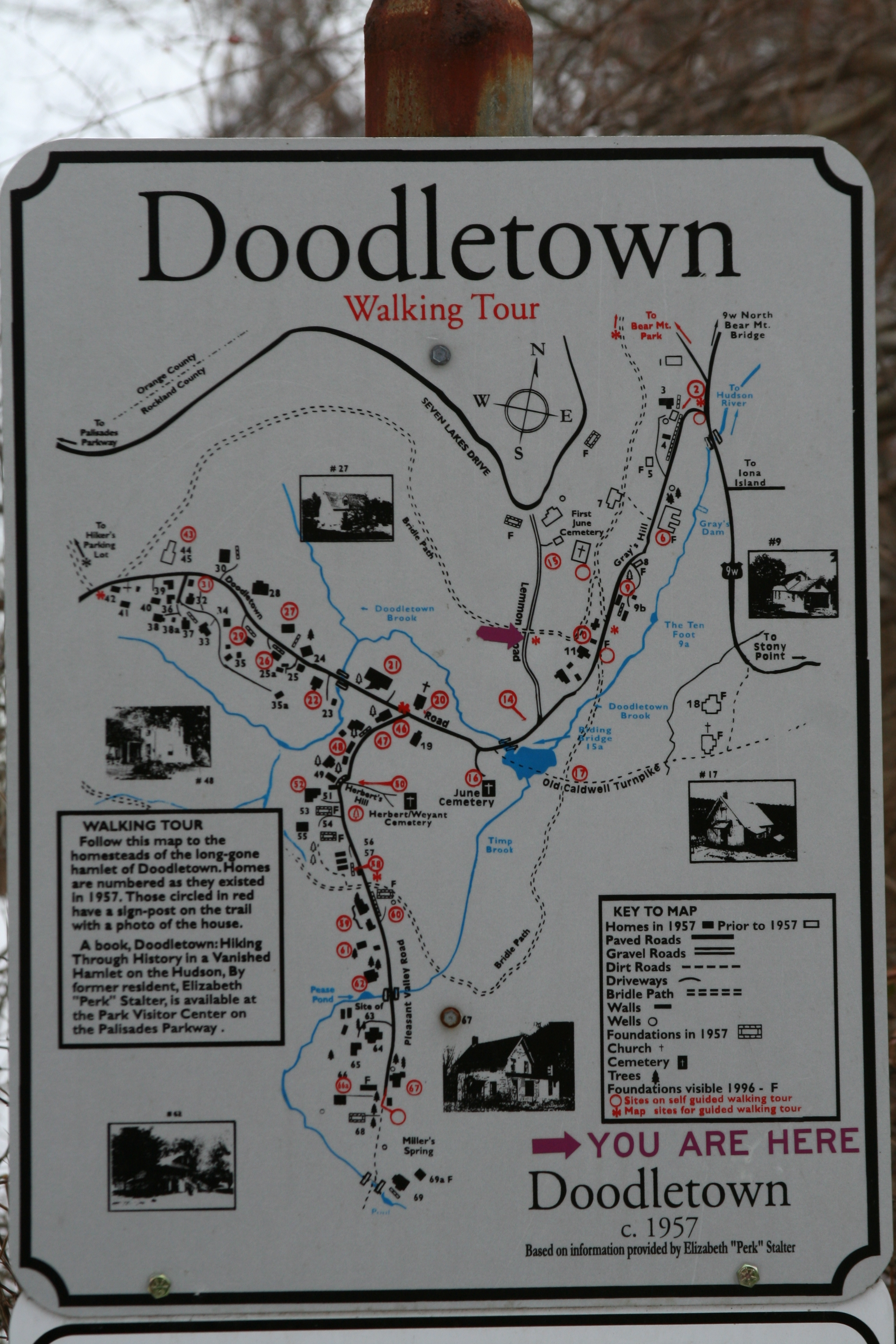
Map of Doodletown located within Bear Mountain State Park

Doodletown was an isolated hamlet in the Town of Stony Point, Rockland County, New York, United States. Purchased by the Palisades Interstate Park Commission during the 1960s, it is now part of Bear Mountain State Park and a popular destination for hikers, birdwatchers, botanists, and local historians. It is located north of Jones Point, west of Iona Island, and southeast of Orange County. The former settlement is now a ghost town.

Members of the first family to settle in Doodletown during the 18th century, Huguenots whose last name was anglicized to "June", were also the last to leave it in the 1960s.

== History ==
The Munsee Indians were the first to inhabit the valley. In 1683 Stephanus Van Cortlandt bought the land in the area from the Haverstraw Indians. In April 1762, Ithiel June purchased 72 acres from the Tomkins family who were already living there. The name is said to derive from the Dutch Dooddel, or "dead valley", with the "town" suffix added later by English-speaking settlers.

The settlement was a crossroads for soldiers during the Revolutionary War during battles at Bear Mountain's Fort Montgomery when many hundreds of British soldiers marched through the tiny settlement prior to a bloody and significant battle with colonists. The Doodletown Road was used by troops accompanying Mad Anthony Wayne on his successful attack on Stony Point.

Early residents worked as loggers and miners, and the remains of the mines are still visible today. There were also small farms and businesses. Others worked at the Iona Island Picnic Grove, a resort built on Iona Island after the Civil War. Around 1900 the United States Navy purchased Iona for an ammunition depot. In 1903 there was a severe explosion at the site, and a worker from Doodletown was killed.

Around 1854, the Mountville Presbyterian Church was built to serve the families of Doodletown. The building was also used for a school.

In the 1890s, Thomas Edison bought a defunct iron mine in Doodletown to test his proposed technique for an improved method of refining ore. Nothing came of his project, although several iron mines had been successfully developed and abandoned in the neighborhood at a much earlier date.

By the 1920s, the height of population for Doodletown, the settlement had a school, a church, several small businesses, two cemeteries and approximately 70 homes. At least several families had lived there for generations. Around this era, military and tourism-related enterprises on nearby Iona Island employed residents, as did the Palisades Interstate Park Commission.

Other residences were maintained as second homes or were inhabited by retired people from the New York City area, and Doodletown's population thus reached its historic peak of about 350 residents.

Bear Mountain began to be developed as a park in the early 20th century, and began to expand around 1920, in part by purchasing property from the landowners in Doodletown, as did the separate but contiguous Harriman State Park, where a story that is analogous but less widely noted than Doodletown, concerns the nearby hamlet of Jones Point. By the 1950s, most of the Doodletown residents had moved away, many to nearby Stony Point or into southern Orange County. Those who refused to sell lost their land through eminent domain by 1965, and most of the remaining structures were demolished or disassembled and moved out by the late 1960s. Debris was buried, the roads were closed, and the surrounding woods were allowed to grow over the properties. In the early 1970s, a dam was built on the Timp Brook, creating a sizable pond. The last remaining building, the stone school house, was kept as a shelter for hikers until vandalism caused the park commission to tear it down in 1980.

Doodletown and nearby Iona Island were designated as New York State Important Bird Areas in 1997 and a New York State Bird Conservation Area.

== Hiking ==
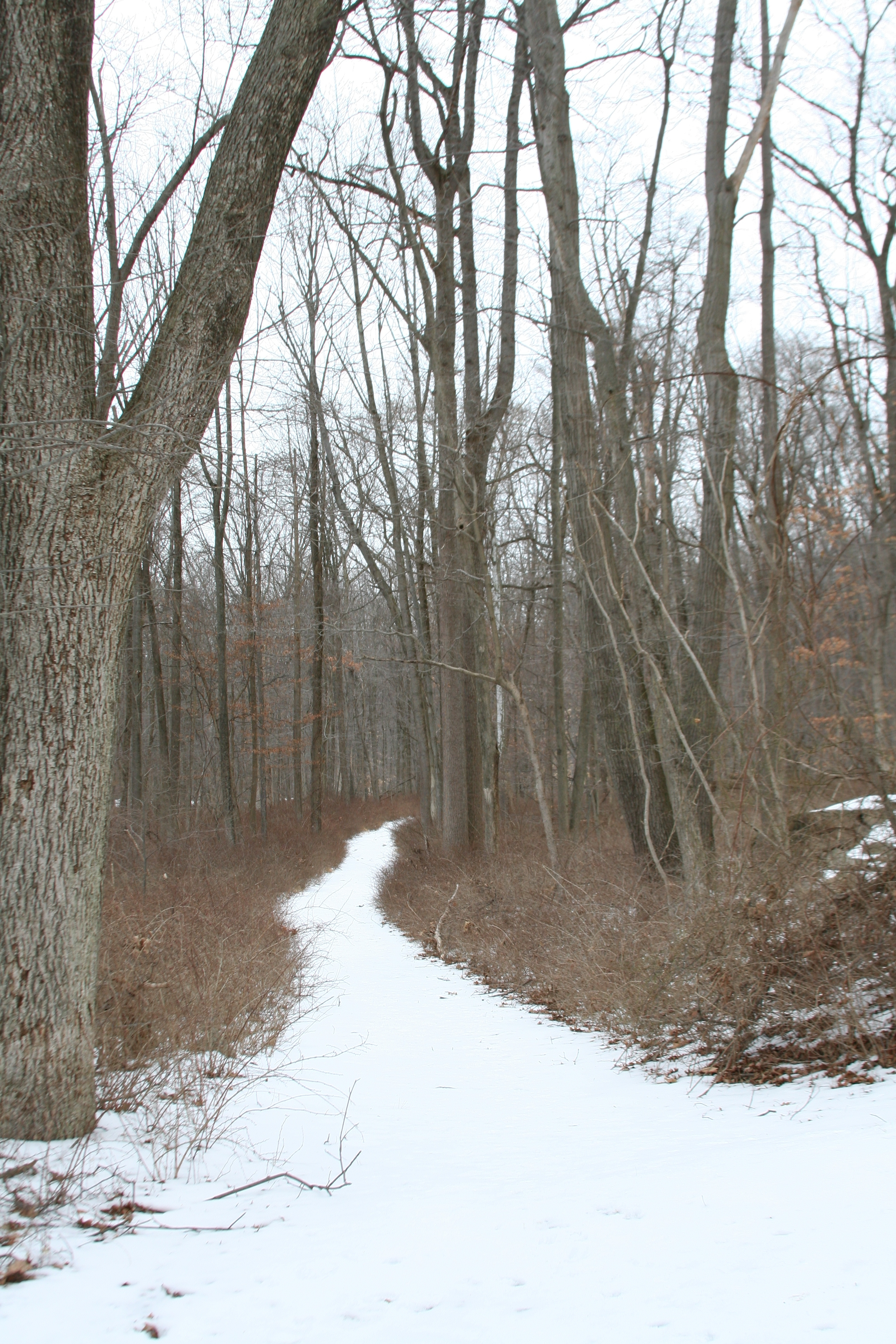
View of the Bridle Path in the winter

Today, many foundations, walls, and staircases are still visible. The area is accessible by various trails and former roadways. The town's cemeteries contain graves ranging from centuries old to much more recent years, as former residents and their relatives can still choose to be buried there. Steel signage has recently been installed by the park service, listing which families owned each property and often showing photographs of former buildings. Orientation signs are located at intervals throughout the area.

The simplest and most direct access for hikers is from a small parking area on Route 9W near Iona Island. From here one follows the Cornell Mine Trail to the 1777 East Trail, which runs directly into the heart of the area. Doodletown may also be approached from the south end of the parking lot at Bear Mountain Inn via an underpass beneath Seven Lakes Drive. Other approaches include from the Palisades Parkway side, taking the Fawn Trail to the Bridle Path, or from Jones Point and over Dunderberg Mountain, taking the Ramapo-Dunderberg trail to the Cornell Mine trail. One may also enter the area from the Long Mountain Parkway side, which is a more direct route to the 1777 West Trail or the Bridle Path. Hikers are urged to be wary of rattlesnakes, copperheads, black snakes and garters still prevalent in the area.
