= Buckberg =

Hill above the Hudson River

Buckberg mountain is a hill above the Hudson River that played a role in American Revolutionary War strategy concerning the Hudson Highlands.

== History ==
The mountain slopes rise directly from the riverbank to an elevation of about 793 feet (242 m) above Tomkins Cove, a section of Stony Point, New York, in Rockland County. It is flanked on the north and south by Camp Addisone Boyce of the Girl Scouts of the USA and Camp Bullowa of the Boy Scouts of America. In recent years its forests have been largely subdivided and developed for upscale housing. Buckberg lies about two miles (3 km) south and slightly west of Dunderberg Mountain.

Buckberg is the site of Washington's Lookout, an observation point used by General George Washington and Colonel "Mad" Anthony Wayne to plan a surprise attack on British troops in the Battle of Stony Point. The post overlooked Haverstraw Bay and afforded views of the Hudson River to the north and south. "Washington-Wayne Lookout Park" is a 5.2-acre (21,000 m^{2}) historic site on the slopes of Buckberg purchased in February 2000 by a consortium led by the Open Space Institute, with funds provided by the "Lila Acheson and DeWitt Wallace Fund for the Hudson Highlands."

A few reliable sources are said to place Buckberg outside the Hudson Highlands.
