= William H. Rose House =

Historic house in New York, United States

- U.S. National Register of Historic Places
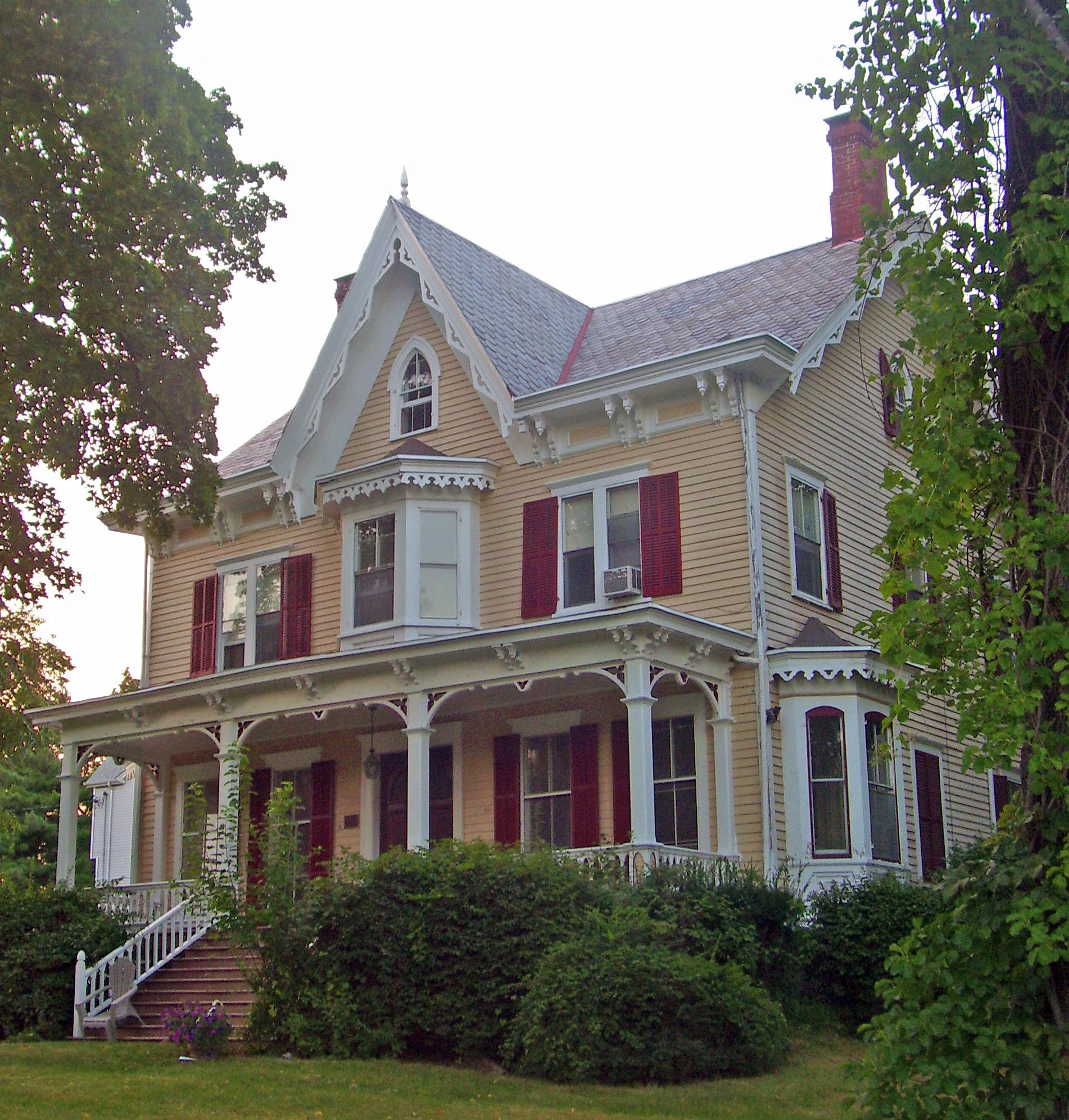
- South elevation and east profile, 2008
- Location: Stony Point, NY
- Nearest city: Peekskill
- Coordinates: 41°14′0″N 73°59′2″W
- Area: less than one acre
- Built: ca. 1862
- Architectural style: Carpenter Gothic
- NRHP reference No.: 99000459
- Added to NRHP: April 15, 1999

The William H. Rose House is located on Tomkins Avenue in Stony Point, New York, United States. It is an ornate Carpenter Gothic-style house from the mid-19th century, with similar outbuildings, built for a wealthy local businessman.

In order to preserve it during the construction of a nearby senior citizens' home during the late 20th century, it was moved from its original site a short distance away and rotated. In 1999 it was listed on the National Register of Historic Places.

== Property ==
The house is located on an 0.4-acre (1,600 m^{2}) lot a short distance east of North Liberty Drive (US 9W/202), at the corner of Tomkins and Roosevelt Place. The ground in the area slopes gently towards the Hudson River to the east. The neighborhood is residential. A senior citizens' apartment complex, called Knight's Corners, is just to the north.

It is a two-and-a-half-story, five-by-three-bay balloon frame house on a concrete foundation topped by a steeply-pitched cross-gabled roof shingled in slate, pierced by two brick chimneys at the sides. The south (front) facade has a porch across the entire first story, with a projecting bay window with scroll-sawn vergeboard above it on the second story. The gable above it has a central arched window, with elaborate vergeboards and finials. A paneled frieze and bracketed cornice adorn the roofline.

The two side elevations are identical, with a projecting bay window on the southernmost bay of the first story. The north (rear) elevation also matches the front facade, with the exception of an enclosure on the western third of the porch.

Inside, the original layout is almost intact. Much of the original trim remains, including the marble fireplace mantel in each room. One of the fireplaces has a coal stove attached. Many of the original light fixtures remain, hanging from plaster medallions in the ceilings.

In back is a carriage house with lines similar to the main building. Its cross-gables have a similar Gothic-arched window, and the roof is topped by a square cupola. Next to it is an unadorned outhouse original to the property. Both are considered contributing resources to the property's historic character.

== History ==
The land on which the house stands was originally part of a large tract purchased by Resolvert Waldron in 1751. Very little of the land around Stony Point was arable, and in the early 19th century brickmaking arose as the dominant industry due to the abundant clay underground near the Hudson. Samuel Brewster, a wealthy iron mine owner and descendant of William Brewster, bought the portion inherited by John Waldron, whose farmhouse was on the Rose House's original site.

Brewster bequeathed it to his grandson Richard and his wife Rachel when he died in 1821. Maps and other records from the mid-19th century show the location of the Waldron House and suggest that the Brewsters did not live there, but rather at a house now in the center of town, at what is now the northwest corner of Routes 9W/202 and Main Street. The same records suggest the Waldron House was demolished by a Paul Rose in 1862 to clear the way for a new house. It is possible that the house may have been a speculative venture by the Brewsters, since the market for housing near the river was strong at the time.

The design, by an unknown architect, shows the strong posthumous influence of the philosophies of Andrew Jackson Downing and the cottage-type houses he promoted. The decorative vergeboards and steep cross-gabled are common elements in this type of early Gothic Revival house, often called Carpenter Gothic today. When built, it originally occupied a 9.4-acre (3.8 ha) lot across the street from its present location, and faced north rather than south.

Rose, a local brickmaker who left that business to make carriages in New York City, probably bought the home to commute to his business in the city, from which he moved his residence sometime before the Civil War. He bought the house for $5,300 ($171,000 in contemporary dollars), apparently without needing to take out a mortgage.

In 1875, he is listed as the owner for the first time. Two years later, he sold it to Minoff Govan, a local physician, while holding the mortgage himself, and bought it back in 1882. The Govans continued to live there, until daughter Edith sold it a Ruth Martz for $1. She held onto the home until 1985, when she was herself living in a New Jersey nursing home. The Housing Development Fund Company, which bought it from her, sold it a month later to a William Helmer.

When the Roosevelt House was built, a strong community effort was mounted to preserve the Rose House. Those led to it being sold to Roy Moskoff, once again for $1, on the condition that the house and outbuildings be moved 200 feet (61 m) across the street and rotated. This was done and the house remains a private residence.

== See also ==
- National Register of Historic Places listings in Rockland County, New York
