= Tomkins Cove, New York =

Hamlet in New York, United States

Coordinates: 41°15′25″N 73°59′01″W

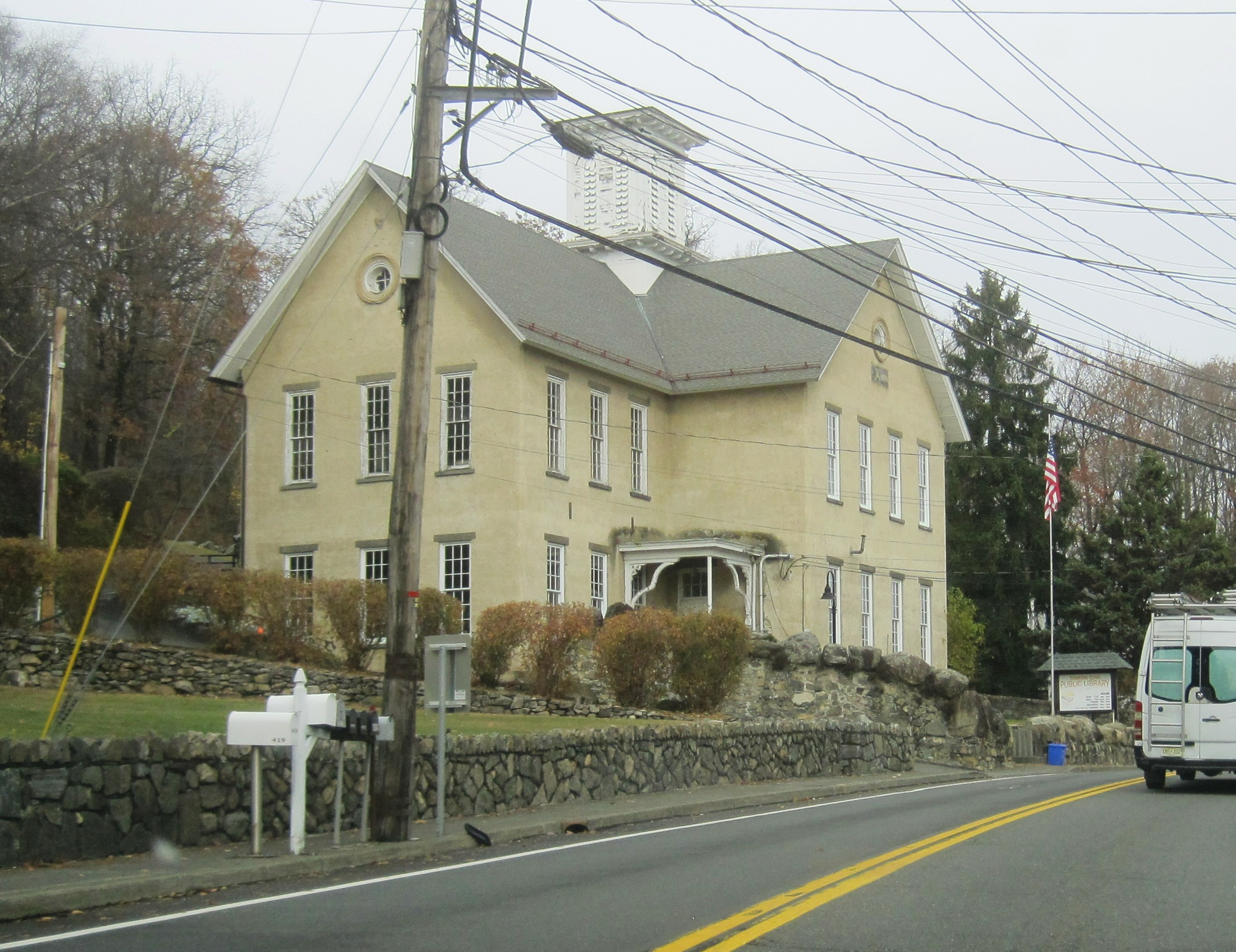
Tomkins Cove, NY public library, Nov. 2024

Tomkins Cove is a hamlet in the Town of Stony Point, Rockland County, New York, United States, located north of Stony Point; east of Harriman State Park; south of Doodletown and west of the Hudson River. It is located north-northwest of New York City. The population is approximately 1,739 and the ZIP Code is 10986. The community is served by the 786 exchange in area code 845.

Tomkins Cove comprises approximately 8 square miles (21 km^{2}). Notable areas within the town are Tomkins Lake Colony (a private community with a small lake), Rising Hills Estates, Buckberg Mountain, the Girl Scout Camp (Camp Addisone Boyce), the Town Pool, the Tomkins Cove Library, and Cedar Flats Road. Mott Farm Road extends west from US 9W to Bulsontown Road. A natural gas pipeline runs from the Hudson River into Stony Point. Much of the Tomkins Cove perimeter borders Bear Mountain State Park. Tomkins Cove prides itself on having a cut through of the Appalachian trail which leads into Bear Mountain. It is one of the more rural communities in Rockland County. Tomkins Cove is accessible from Exit 15 on the Palisades Interstate Parkway.

== History ==
In 1838 Calvin Tomkins and his brother Daniel purchased approximately 20 acres (81,000 m^{2}) of land, located in a cove north of the Stony Point promontory, underlaid with rock suitable for burning along the river shore for the purpose of making lime. The village grew around the works and when the post office was opened at this site, it was named after the founder's name and its location.

According to some geologists from that time, Tomkins Cove had the purest limestone formation in the world, except for certain deposits in Russia.

The Hudson River National Defense Fleet established by an act of Congress in 1946, was first located off Tarrytown, one of eight anchorages in the United States to provide a sizable group of merchant ships to support the military effort at the outset of any war. On April 30, 1946, the Hudson River fleet was moved further north to Jones Point (at one time known as Caldwell's Landing) at the foot of Dunderberg Mountain. The fleet was at its peak with 189 ships in July 1965. Anchored in ten rows, it extended from the fleet office at the Jones Point dock several miles to the south — to the Boulderberg House at Tomkins Cove. Several viewing points were established along Route 9W for the hundreds of motorists who stopped daily to look at the ships. The anchorage remained until the last two ships were towed away on July 8, 1971, to be sold for scrap to Spain.

== Notable residents ==
- Kim Plainfield, drummer & associate professor at Berklee College of Music (1954-2017)
- David Tudor, pianist and electronic music composer (1926-1996)
- Stan Vanderbeek (1927-1984)

== Books and publications ==
- Zimmerman, Linda Rockland County: Century of History

== See also ==
- "Mothball Fleet"
