= Stony Point, New York =

Town of Stony Point
- Town
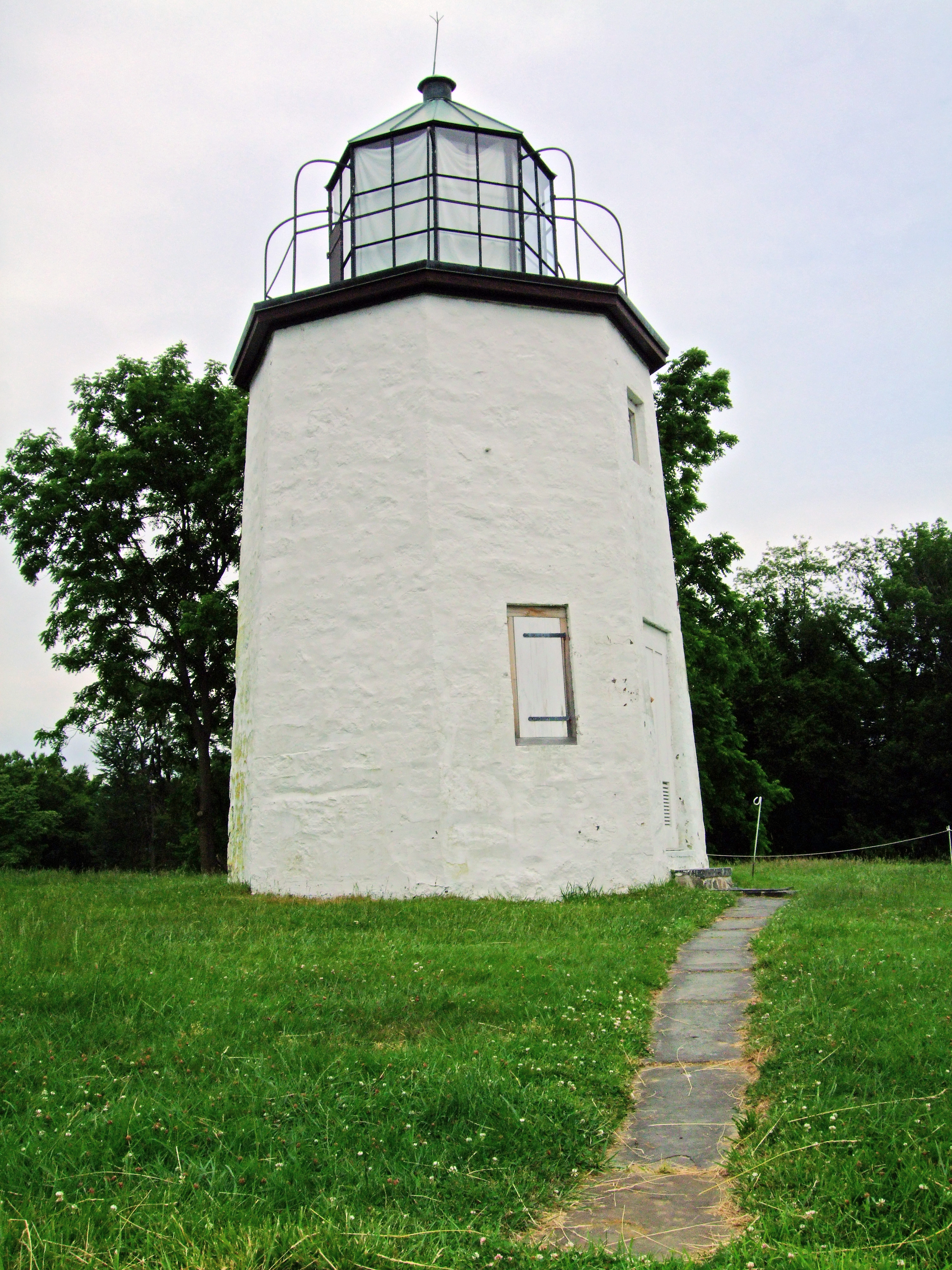
- Stony Point Light in Stony Point

- Seal

- Location in Rockland County and the state of New York.

- Location within the state of New York
- Coordinates: 41°14′14″N 74°0′4″W
- Country: United States
- State: New York
- County: Rockland
- Established: March 20, 1865

Government
  - Supervisor: Amy Stamm

Area
  - Total: 31.60 sq mi (81.84 km^{2})
  - Land: 27.62 sq mi (71.54 km^{2})
  - Water: 3.98 sq mi (10.30 km^{2})
- Elevation: 282 ft (86 m)

Population (2020)
  - Total: 14,813
  - Density: 536.3/sq mi (207.06/km^{2})
- Time zone: UTC-5 (EST)
  - Summer (DST): UTC-4 (EDT)
- ZIP code: 10980
- Area codes: 845; 329
- FIPS code: 36-71674
- GNIS feature ID: 0979532
- Website: https://www.stonypointny.gov/

Stony Point is a town situated in the northeastern corner of Rockland County, New York, located within the Hudson Valley and the New York Metropolitan Area. As of the 2020 United States Census, the town's population was 14,813.

Geographically, the town is bounded to the north and west by Orange County, to the east by the Hudson River and Westchester County, and to the south by the Town of Haverstraw. The town's name is derived from a prominent projection into the Hudson River, which served as a significant site during the American Revolution.

Stony Point is characterized as the most rural of the county's five towns. It is served by several major transportation arteries, including U.S. Route 9W, U.S. Route 202, and the Palisades Interstate Parkway, which provides vital north–south access through the region.

== History ==
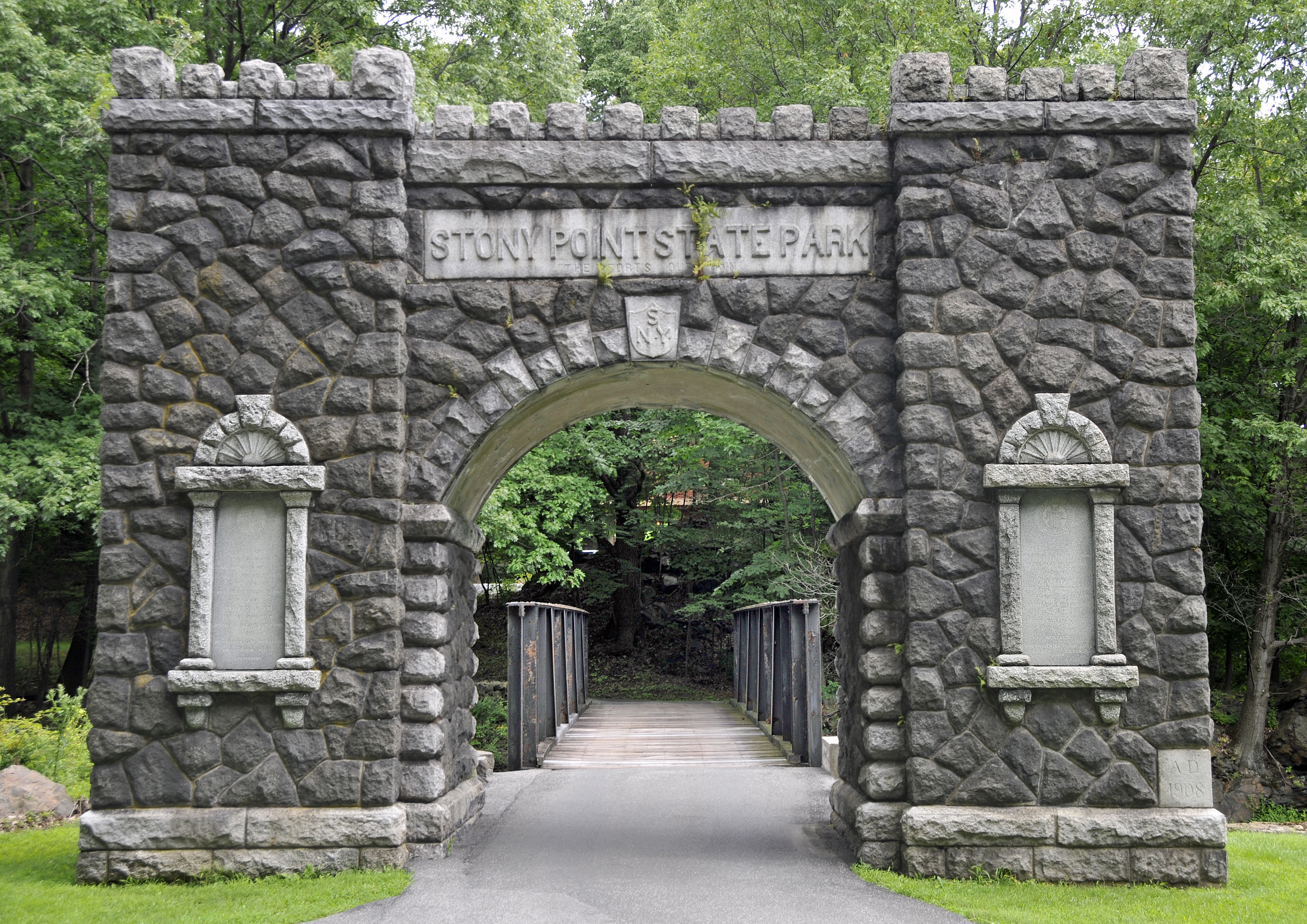
Stony Point State Park

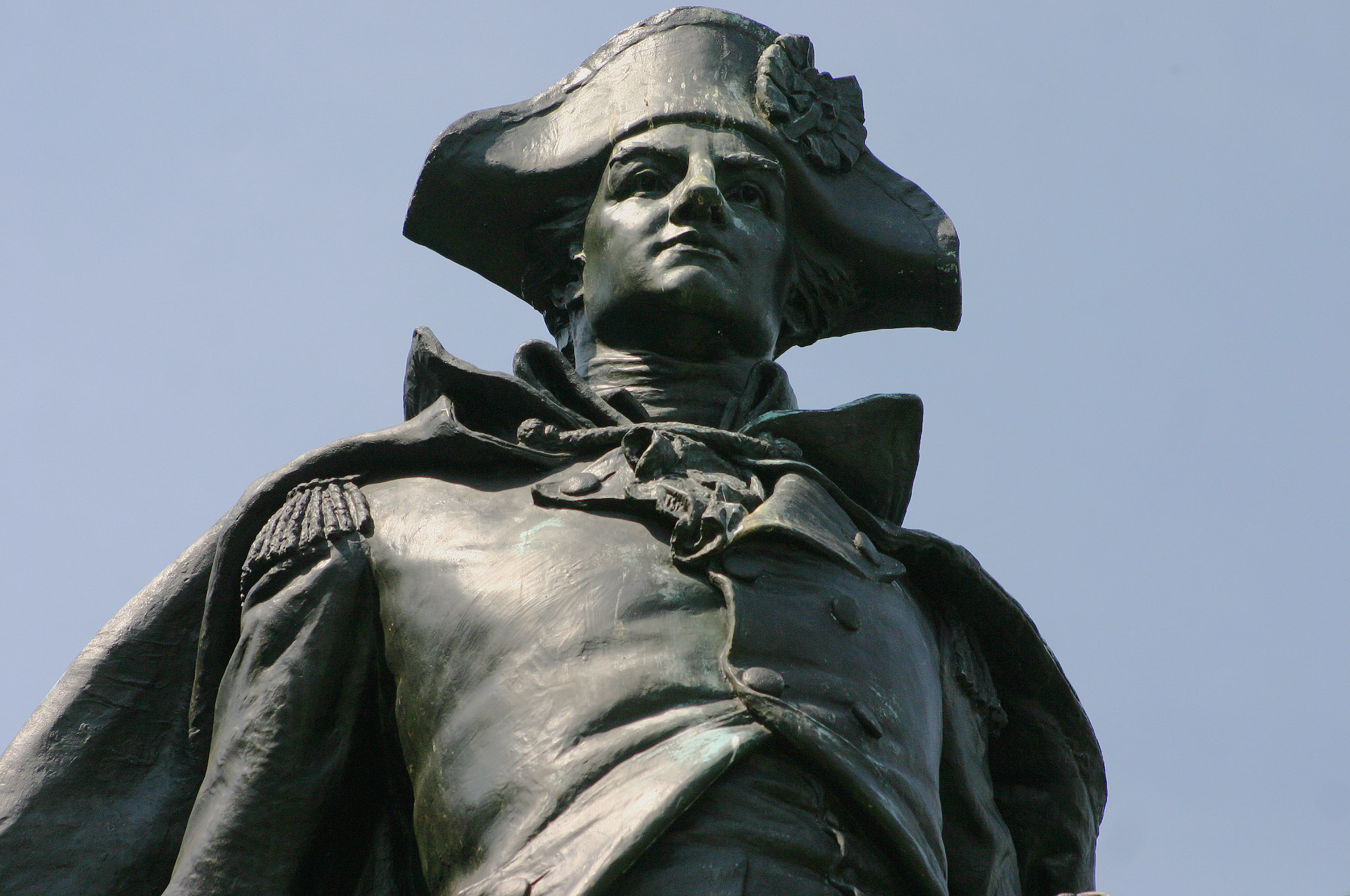
The General "Mad" Anthony Wayne statue in Stony Point

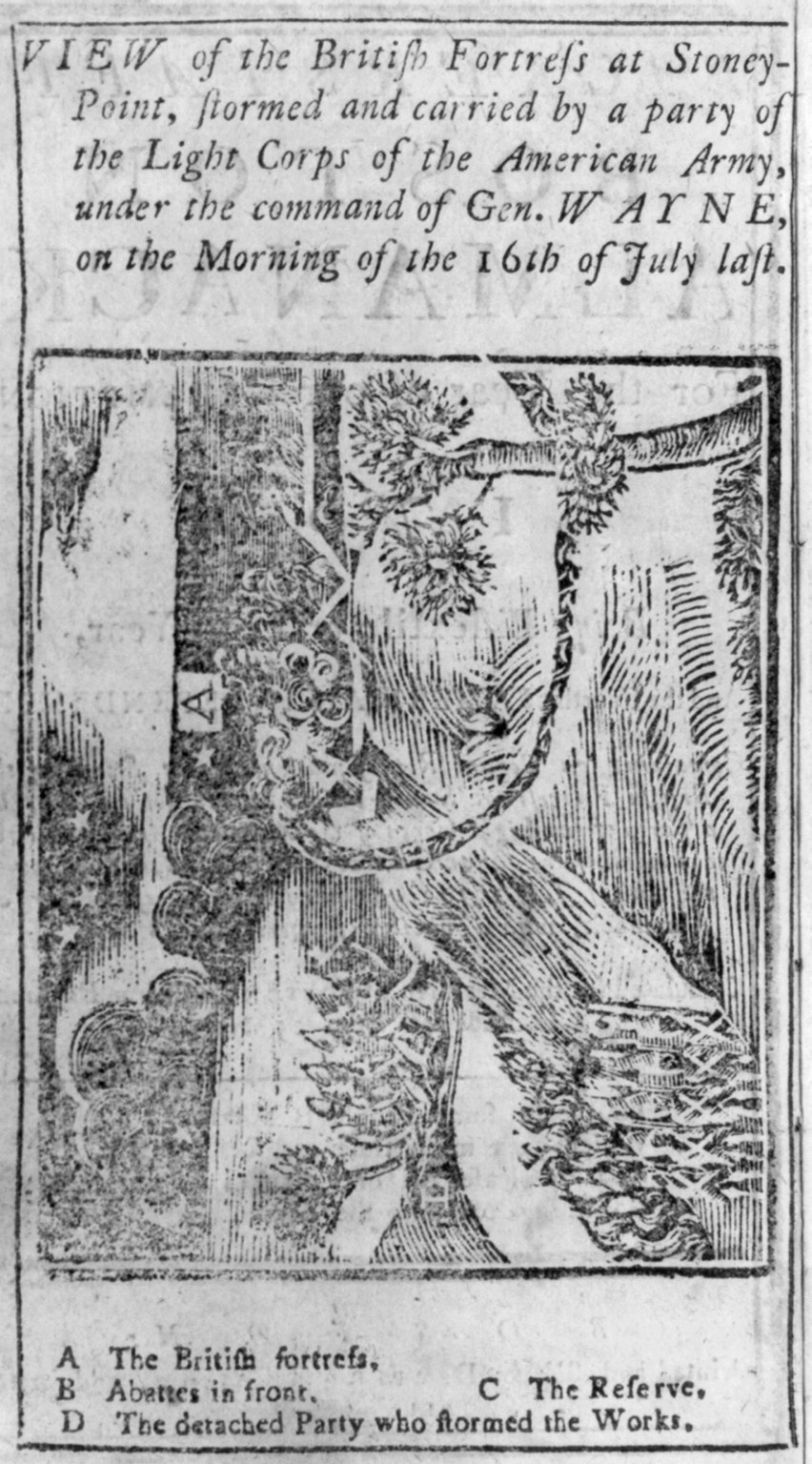
View of the British fortress at Stony Point

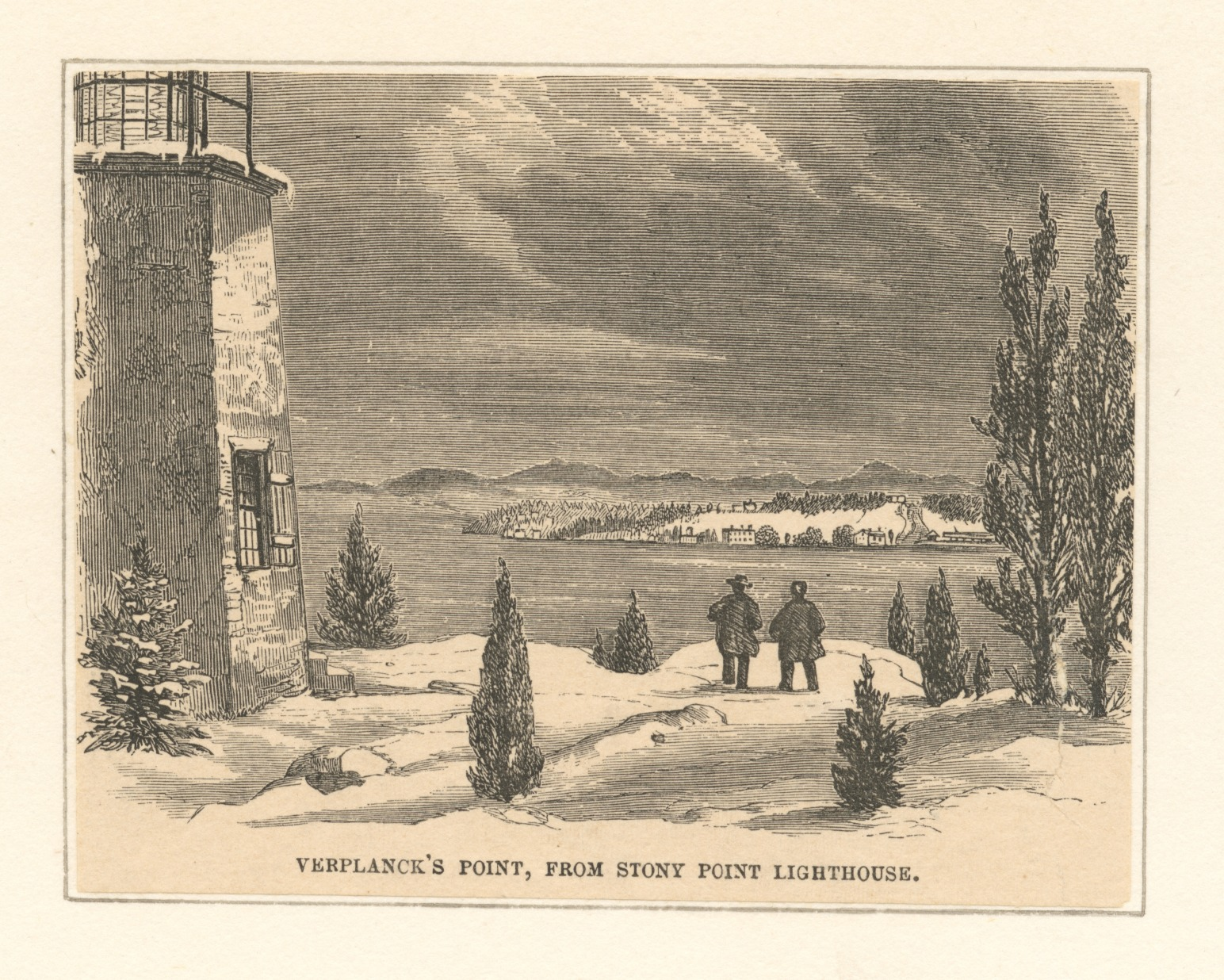
Verplanck's Point, from Stony Point Lighthouse

During the American Revolution, the King's Ferry in Stony Point linked New York and the southern colonies with New England; it was used many times by General George Washington's Continental Army, and in 1781 Washington's French allies also used it on their way to the Battle of Yorktown.

The economy of the town improved upon the rediscovery of limestone deposits in the 19th century. The town of Stony Point was founded in 1865 from the northern part of the town of Haverstraw.

=== Battle of Stony Point ===
During the American Revolution, defending the area of Stony Point was crucial. Even George Washington himself prioritized keeping Stony Point, along with the areas around it safe. The importance of controlling that area was crucial to the control of West Point, which is why Washington found taking back the area so important. Washington assigned Major Henry Lee and General Anthony Wayne as the men in charge, and knew the importance of controlling the area.

Having control of Stony Point would enable Washington to have the most effective line of communication between certain colonies. The geography of the town attributed into the advantages the area had to offer. For example, the rockiness and woods made it a good place to keep watch over the Hudson River. General Wayne planned his attack accordingly, and executed the attack effectively.

Stony Point was controlled by British troops, but Washington wanted control to help take down their strong naval forces. By taking control, the Americans would gain an advantage over the British for the remainder of the war. Although it wasn't a definitive battle, it still played a major role in the outcome of the American Revolution.

During the Battle of Stony Point, there were many different sources of weaponry. One of the main ones used was a bayonet. The British soldiers relied heavily on the sword on the end of their rifles, simply because it was more effective during the battle. Although it might seem ironic that a sword can out do a firearm, but the bayonets were extremely effective if soldiers were trained to use it. Also, the rifles at the time of the battle had flaws, such as it being too light. General Wayne took note of this, and advised his side to stay away from the use of rifles. He encouraged the use of muskets and bayonets for the same reasoning.

A possible contribution to the American cause in connection with the Battle of Stony Point was by an African-American slave named 'Pompey.' According to later writings by historian Benson Lossing and later repeated by others, Pompey realized the willingness of the American troops to go the extra mile for victory, which is why he offered to help. His duties were said to include selling and delivering food to the British, especially strawberries. He is said to have frequently spoken with British troops. After acquiring information from them, including the countersign to gain entry to the fort at night, he brought it to the American troops. This enabled General Wayne to attack the British in a night attack where they least expected it at Stony Point. Michael J. F. Sheehan, Senior Historian at the Stony Point Battlefield State Historic Site wrote that Pompey likely was a real person but this story of his contribution to the Patriot cause is a myth. (Note: In Sheehan, Michael J.F.(2016) "The Mythology of Stony Point, Journal of the American Revolution, November 3, 2016, retrieved May 12, 2023, unpaginated on the internet, Sheehan wrote that assuming Lamb did exist, "he is not once mentioned by anyone before, during, or after the battle, British or American." He wrote that "The idea of Lamb selling berries has two major stumbling blocks." First, "early June is not typical strawberry season in New York". Also, the British adjutant, Ensign Henry Hamilton, in the court martial of the fort commander testified that “Lt. Col. Johnson would not allow of a Countersign, either the Night of the Attack or any other.” According to Hamilton, no passwords would permit the entry, even of a friend, into the works at night.)

== Geography ==
According to the United States Census Bureau, the town has a total area of 31.6 square miles (81.8 km^{2}), of which 27.6 square miles (71.5 km^{2}) is land and 4.0 square miles (10.3 km^{2}), or 12.58%, is water.

The town is situated in the northern portion of the county. It is bounded to the north and west by Orange County and to the south by the Town of Haverstraw. The Hudson River forms the eastern border, with Westchester County located on the opposite shore.

== Communities ==
Communities and population centers are primarily concentrated within the corridor between the Palisades Interstate Parkway, which traverses the center of the town, and U.S. Route 9W, which parallels the Hudson River to the east.

To the west and northeast of the parkway, the landscape transitions into extensive protected parklands, including significant portions of Harriman State Park and Bear Mountain State Park. Consequently, residential and commercial development is largely focused within the eastern and central corridor, while the western interior of the town remains predominantly undeveloped.

The town of Stony Point contains several distinct hamlets and residential areas:

Name	Type	Description
Stony Point	Hamlet	A hamlet and census-designated place (CDP) located in the southern portion of the town, situated between the Palisades Interstate Parkway and U.S. Route 9W. As the town seat, it serves as the administrative center, housing the majority of municipal offices and the town's primary population center.
Grassy Point	Hamlet	A hamlet situated on a peninsula extending into the Hudson River in the southeastern corner of the town.
Tomkins Cove	Hamlet	A hamlet located in the northeastern part of the town along the Hudson River, characterized by its historic character and proximity to Bear Mountain State Park.
Jones Point	Hamlet	A hamlet situated along the Hudson River; it is the easternmost and northernmost community in the town.
Willow Grove	Community	A community located along the southern town line, primarily west of the Palisades Interstate Parkway. It encompasses Jessup Valley, a residential area surrounding Jessup Lake.
Cedar Flats	Community	A community situated northwest of the Stony Point hamlet, east of the Palisades Interstate Parkway and north of Willow Grove.
Bulsontown	Community	A community located east of Cedar Flats.
Doodletown	Hamlet	An abandoned hamlet situated in the northern corner of the town within Bear Mountain State Park. Located north of Jones Point, west of Iona Island, and southeast of the Orange County line, the community was vacated and dismantled in 1965.

== Demographics ==
Historical population
Census	Pop.	Note	%±
1870	3,205		—
1880	3,308		3.2%
1890	4,614		39.5%
1900	4,161		−9.8%
1910	3,651		−12.3%
1920	3,211		−12.1%
1930	3,458		7.7%
1940	4,898		41.6%
1950	5,485		12.0%
1960	8,739		59.3%
1970	12,704		45.4%
1980	12,838		1.1%
1990	12,814		−0.2%
2000	14,244		11.2%
2010	15,059		5.7%
2020	14,813		−1.6%
U.S. Decennial Census

=== 2000 census ===
As of the census of 2000, there were 14,245 people, 4,832 households, and 3,802 families residing in the town. The population density was 511.7 inhabitants per square mile (197.6/km²). There were 4,951 housing units at an average density of 177.9 per square mile (68.7/km²).

The racial makeup of the town was 94.33% white, 1.27% Black or African American, 0.19% Native American, 1.29% Asian, 0.02% Pacific Islander, 1.66% from other races, and 1.24% from two or more races. Hispanic or Latino of any race were 6.84% of the population.

There were 4,832 households, of which 38.0% had children under the age of 18 living with them, 66.2% were married couples living together, 9.1% had a female householder with no husband present, and 21.3% were non-families. Individuals made up 17.3% of all households, and 8.1% had someone living alone who was 65 years of age or older. The average household size was 2.92 and the average family size was 3.33.

The population was spread out by age, with 26.1% under the age of 18, 6.6% from 18 to 24, 30.6% from 25 to 44, 24.9% from 45 to 64, and 11.8% who were 65 years of age or older. The median age was 38 years. For every 100 females, there were 97.8 males. For every 100 females age 18 and over, there were 94.0 males.

=== 2020 census and estimates ===
As of the 2020 United States census, there were 14,813 people residing in the town. As of July 2024, the population was estimated to have increased to 14,986.

== Economy ==
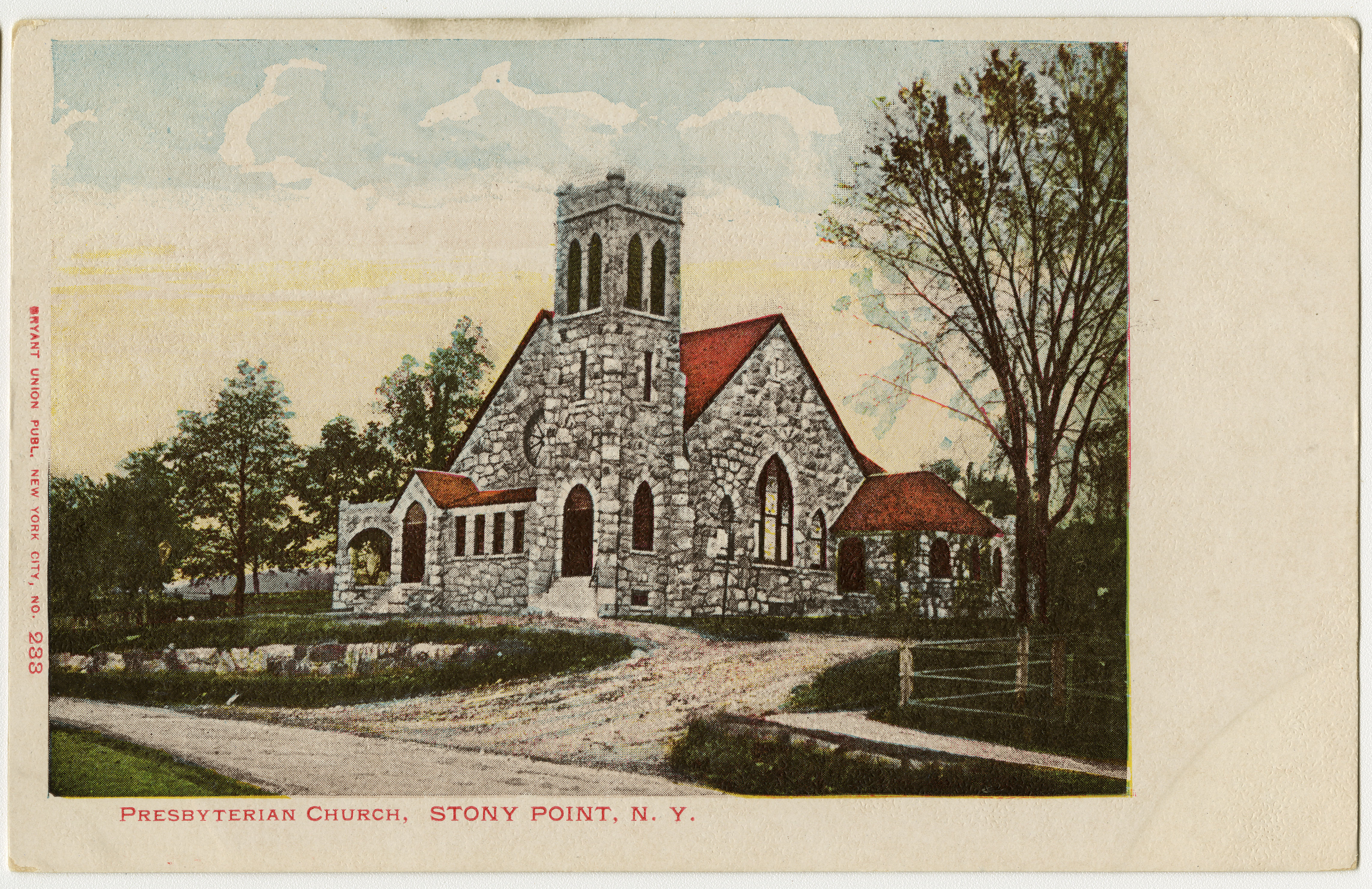
Stony Point Presbyterian Church, built 1904

According to the 2024 U.S. Census Bureau estimates, the Town of Stony Point maintains a robust local economy with a median household income of $126,958 and a median family income of $153,571. The per capita income for the town was recorded at $49,839. Economic earnings in the community show significant stability across middle-age demographics, with households headed by individuals aged 25 to 44 earning a median of $163,750, while those in the 45 to 64 age bracket earned a median of $158,958. Approximately 5.2% of the population lived below the poverty line, including 7.4% of those under age 18 and 4.1% of those aged 65 or over.

The town's labor force is primarily employed in service-oriented and professional sectors. The largest employment industries include educational services, health care and social assistance, and retail trade. High-earning sectors within the town are led by utilities and public administration, both of which provide median annual earnings exceeding $131,000. The housing market reflects these economic trends, with an 85.2% homeownership rate and a median owner-occupied housing value of $525,900. For the rental market, the median gross rent in the town was $1,830 as of the most recent federal estimates.

== Government ==
The Town of Stony Point operates under a town council–supervisor form of government, common among towns in the state of New York. The legislative and executive authority of the town is vested in the Town Board, which consists of a Town Supervisor and four Councilmembers. The Town Board is responsible for setting policy, adopting the town budget, and overseeing municipal operations.

Stony Point maintains a range of municipal departments and boards that support local governance, including planning and zoning boards, a police department, and various administrative offices. These entities work under the authority of the Town Board to provide services such as public safety, infrastructure maintenance, land use regulation, and community services.

== Public safety ==
Public safety in the Town of Stony Point is provided through a coordinated system of law enforcement, fire protection, and emergency medical services. These services are delivered by a combination of municipal and volunteer agencies, working together to respond to emergencies, protect life and property, and support the well-being of residents and visitors.

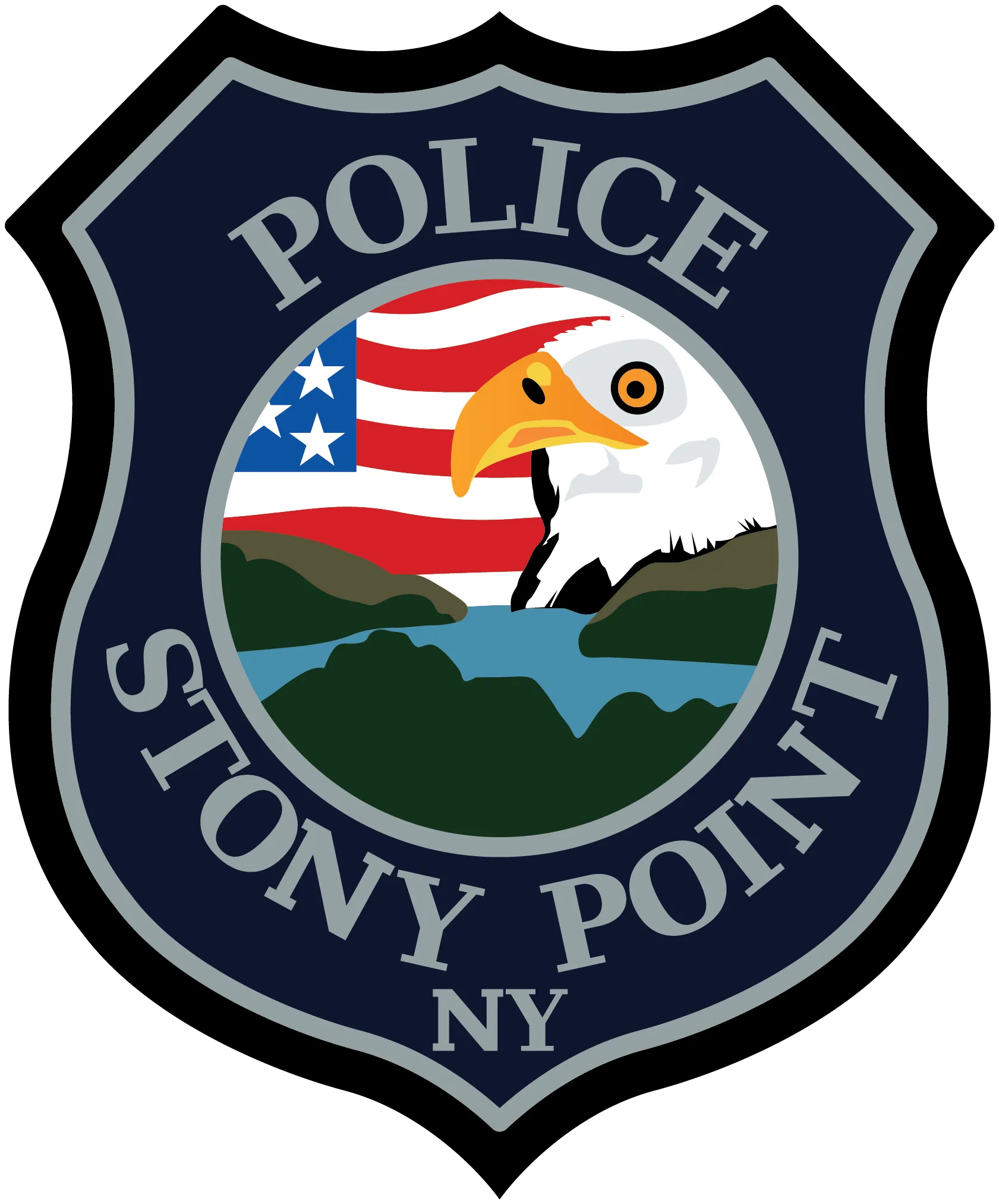
Stony Point Police Department logo

=== Stony Point Police Department ===
The Stony Point Police Department is the primary law enforcement agency serving the Town of Stony Point. The department provides police services including patrol, criminal investigations, traffic enforcement, and community policing. It operates from its headquarters at 79 Route 210 and serves the town in coordination with county and state law enforcement agencies.

==== History ====
Prior to the establishment of a municipal police force, law enforcement in Stony Point was provided by local constables and the New York State Police. In 1967, following requests from residents, the Town Board authorized the creation of a full-time police department. Stephen G. Scurti, a New York State Trooper, was appointed as the first Chief of Police on October 25, 1967.

The department initially operated with a small number of part-time officers and expanded steadily in response to increasing service demands. In 1972, it transitioned to continuous 24-hour operations, and in 1973 established a Detective Bureau. By the late 1970s, the department had grown to include nearly 20 full-time officers.

In 1980, the department relocated to its current headquarters on Route 210. Over time, it developed additional programs and specialized functions, including a Police Athletic League, Youth Bureau, K-9 unit, and participation in regional task forces.

The department was accredited in 1991 by the New York State Division of Criminal Justice Services, becoming the first police agency in Rockland County to achieve this designation.

==== Organization ====
The department is led by the Chief of Police, who is responsible for administration and operations. As of 2024, the department’s authorized strength consists of 27 full-time officers, along with part-time officers, auxiliary personnel, and civilian staff.

Operational functions include uniformed patrol, investigations, traffic enforcement, and school-based policing through a School Resource Officer program in partnership with the North Rockland Central School District. The department also participates in regional initiatives such as the Rockland County Narcotics Task Force and intelligence-sharing programs.

=== Stony Point Fire Department ===
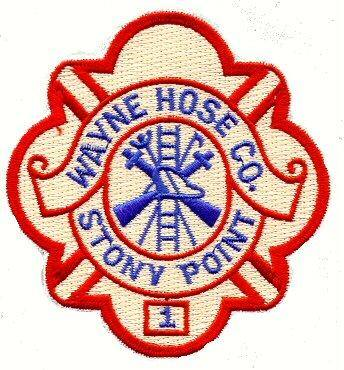
Stony Point Fire Department logo

Wayne Hose Company No. 1 is a volunteer fire company serving the Town of Stony Point as part of the Stony Point Fire District. The company provides fire suppression, rescue, and emergency response services, and is designated as Department 18. It operates from two stations and maintains a fleet of fire apparatus and specialized rescue equipment.

==== History ====
Wayne Hose Company No. 1 was established in 1894, when 22 local residents organized a volunteer fire company to provide fire protection to the community. The company’s first apparatus consisted of a hand-drawn hose cart carrying approximately 500 feet of hose, which was initially stored in a barn due to the absence of a dedicated firehouse.

In 1897, the company moved into its first firehouse, a brick structure located on West Main Street. As the community expanded, a new two-story firehouse was constructed on Route 9W, and the company relocated there in 1955. Continued growth led to the opening of a second station on Central Highway in 1974 to improve coverage in the southern portion of the town.

The company transitioned from hand-drawn equipment to motorized apparatus beginning in 1918 with the acquisition of a Studebaker hose and chemical truck. Over time, it expanded its capabilities to include modern fire engines, aerial apparatus, and specialized rescue units, including water and dive rescue operations.

In 1965, Wayne Hose Company No. 1 participated in the Second inauguration of Lyndon B. Johnson in Washington, D.C., becoming the only known volunteer fire company in the United States to march in a presidential inaugural parade.

==== Organization and Operations ====
Wayne Hose Company No. 1 operates within the Stony Point Fire District. The company provides fire suppression, technical rescue, and water-based emergency response services, including underwater and swift water rescue.

The company operates from two stations:

- Station 18-100 (Main Station) – 25 North Liberty Drive (constructed 1955)
- Station 18-101 (Substation) – 199 Central Highway (constructed 2012)

The department maintains a fleet of apparatus including pumpers, a tanker, an aerial tower ladder, rescue units, brush units, and marine assets. These resources support both structural firefighting and specialized operations such as wildland firefighting and water rescue.

Stony Point Ambulance Corps logo

=== Stony Point Ambulance Corps ===
The Stony Point Ambulance Corps is a volunteer-based emergency medical service providing basic life support prehospital care and ambulance transport to the Town of Stony Point, serving residents and visitors within the town and surrounding areas.

==== History ====
Stony Point Ambulance Corps was incorporated on October 09, 1946 as a volunteer ambulance service to meet the growing need for emergency medical response in the community. It was founded in the post–World War II era, during a period when many communities across the United States formalized structured volunteer emergency medical services. Since its founding, the corps has operated continuously as a volunteer-driven organization, adapting over time to advances in emergency medicine and increasing call volume.

==== Organization ====
The corps is structured into several divisions that support both operations and administration:

Division	Description
Board of Directors	Governing body responsible for administrative oversight, policy development, and long-term planning.
Association	Operational body composed of more than 60 volunteer emergency medical technicians (EMTs) and emergency vehicle operators (EVOs), as well as approximately two dozen trainee members working toward certification.
Auxiliary	Volunteer support unit of approximately 15 members. Provides non-medical assistance including fundraising, administrative support, and community outreach; it is the only EMS auxiliary program in Rockland County.
Youth Squad	Program for high school students (typically ages 15–18), with approximately two dozen members, providing CPR and first aid training, mentorship, and supervised exposure to emergency medical services.
Staff Members	Approximately 15 per-diem EMTs who supplement volunteer staffing, primarily providing daytime coverage.

==== Operations ====
The Stony Point Ambulance Corps operates from a single station:

- Station 61 – 47 South Liberty Drive (constructed 2012)

The agency maintains a fleet of four ambulances and provides continuous 24-hour coverage through a combination of volunteer and paid personnel, with at least one ambulance staffed at all times. Additional crews are activated as needed to manage multiple simultaneous incidents or large-scale emergencies.

SPAC responds to approximately 1,700 calls annually, including medical emergencies, motor vehicle accidents, and mutual aid requests. Operations are conducted in coordination with local fire departments, law enforcement agencies, and regional emergency services to ensure integrated emergency response and patient care.

== Education ==
The Town of Stony Point is part of the North Rockland Central School District. School choices are varied, with the district providing schooling from kindergarten though 5th grade, 6th grade through 8th grade, and finally 9th grade through 12th grade. The average total SAT score is over 1000 for students in the town.

Schools within the town include:

- Farley Upper Elementary School
- Fieldstone Middle School
- Haverstraw Upper Elementary School
- Immaculate Conception School
- North Rockland High School
- Stony Point Elementary School
- Thiells Elementary School
- West Haverstraw Elementary School
- Willow Grove Upper Elementary School

== Transportation ==
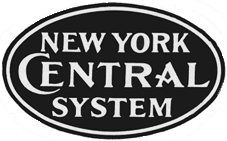
New York Central Herald logo

The ex-New York Central's River Subdivision follows the west bank of the Hudson River through Stony Point. The line is now operated by CSX Transportation, the fourth railroad to operate the line. The only company served by CSX in the town is the Mirant Lovett Generating Station, which receives trainloads of coal approximately once per week. The power station owns and operates its own railroad to bring the coal from the siding at milepost (MP) 38 into the plant. On average, between 20 and 25 trains pass through Stony Point per day.

The Palisades Interstate Parkway passes through the town.

== Tourism ==
=== Historical markers ===
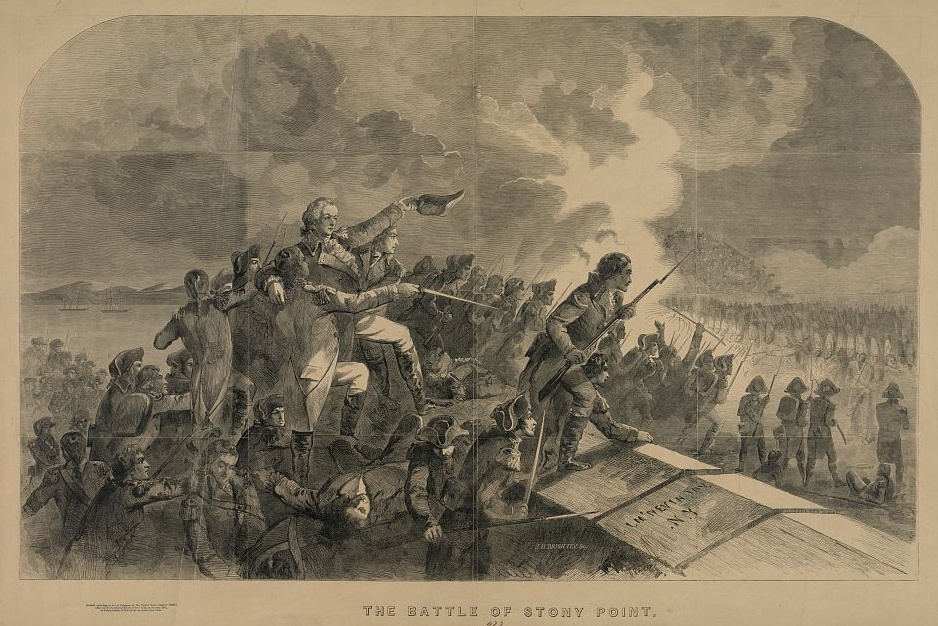
Battle of Stony Point

- Buckberg Mountain, 112 Buckberg Mountain Road
- Site of King's Ferry, Route 9W & Park Road – at Stony Point, just north of Stony Point Battlefield. An important river crossing for American troops and supplies during the Revolution, as it was a link between New England and the states to the south; thus the importance of capturing Stony Point from the British in 1779.
- Site of Springsteel Farm House 1779, 16A Franck Road
- Washington Wayne Lookout
- Wilson H. Young Memorial Bridge, East Main Street
- Site of Springsteel Farm House 1779, 16A Franck Road
- Stony Point Battlefield, Route 9W & Park Road
- The First Road, 117 W. Main Street
- Gilmor Sloane House – The building was put together by Benjiman F. Goodspeed. When he was creating the building in 1856, the structure stemmed from French Renaissance architecture.

=== Landmarks and places of interest ===
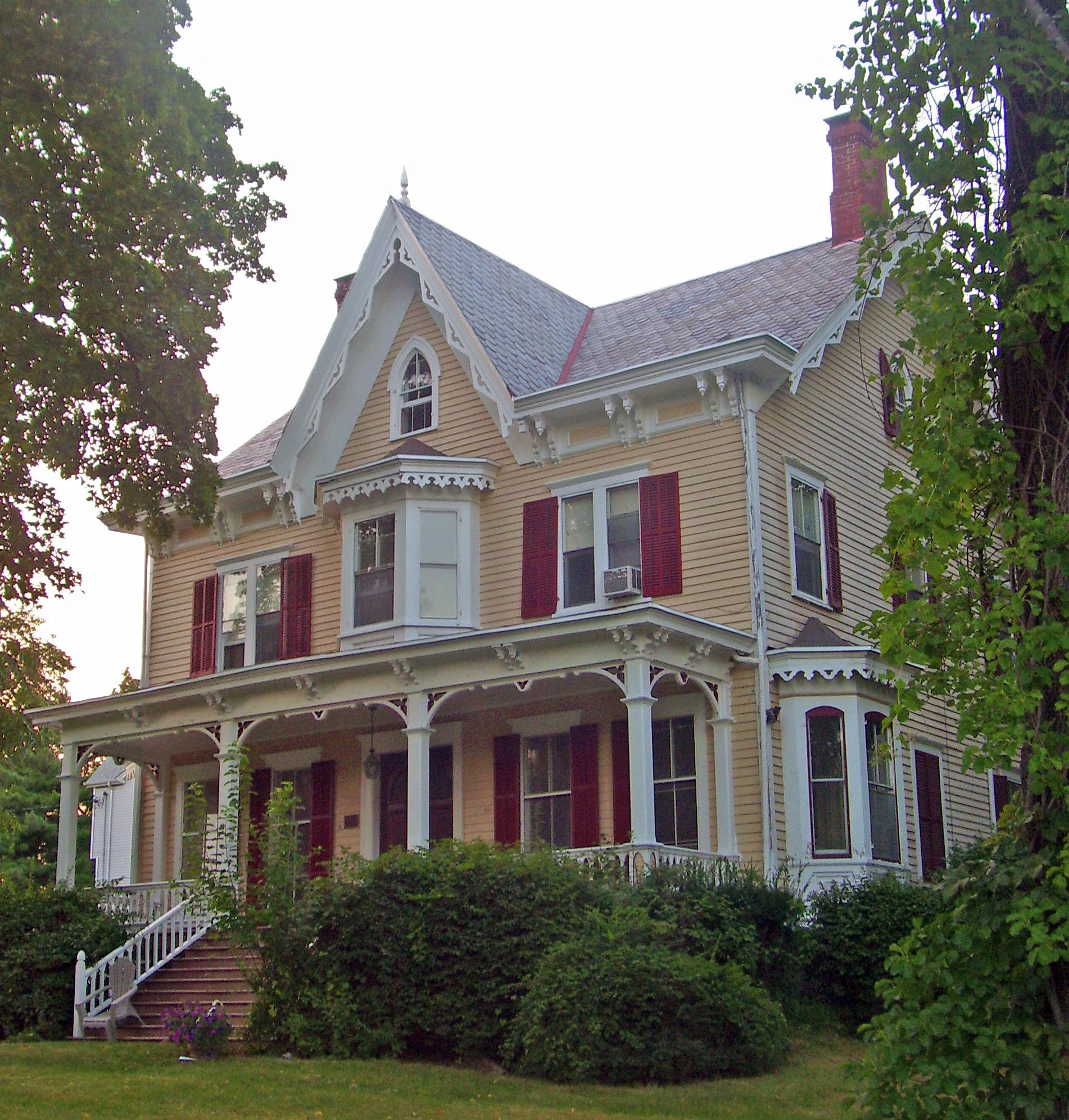
William H. Rose House

- Berlin Wall segment outside the Stony Point Justice Court
- Gilmor Sloane House – 17 Crickettown Rd. An 1856 Victorian mansion with no televisions or telephones. An 1888 Barn Playhouse (Penguin Rep) on grounds.
- Harriman State Park – A large state park partly in the western part of the town.
- Iona Island and Marsh – Between Jones Point and Bear Mountain. It was previously called "Weyants Island".
- Patriot Hills Golf Club – Ranked 20th Best Public Golf Course in New York 2010 by Golf Magazine
- Pyngyp School - (NRHP)
- Stony Point Battlefield – A state historic site, off Route 9W, Stony Point – Occupied by the British in 1779. (NRHP)
- Stony Point Light – In the 1800s and early 1900s the Hudson River Lighthouses allowed ships to travel safely through the waters. This was crucial as the Hudson River is one of the largest rivers in New York State. The Hudson River stretched from New York City, New York, all the way up to Albany, New York. The large river attained a total of 13 lighthouses in its route, and Stony Point opened theirs in 1826. The lighthouse is located on the Stony Point Battlefield, and is still open for tourists to view.
- William H. Rose House (NRHP)

== Notable people ==
- John Cage (1912–1992), composer, lived in Stony Point during the 1950s and 60s
- Stephanie Courtney (1970–), actress and comedian who was born in Stony Point
- James Farley (1888–1976), Postmaster General, Chairman of the Democratic National Committee
- Heinz Hartmann (1894-1970), Austrian-born psychiatrist and psychoanalyst, died in Stony Point
- Richard Humann (1961–), conceptual artist, born and raised in Stony Point until age 18
- James Gregory Faherty (JG Faherty) (1961-), author who writes in the horror, thriller, science fiction, and dark fantasy genres. Born and resided in Stony Point until 2011
- Jasper Johns (1930–), artist, lived in Stony Point during the 1980s and 1990s
- Karen Karnes (1925–2016), potter, lived and worked at Gate Hill Cooperative in Stony Point for 25 years from 1954
- Danielle McEwan (1991–), ten-pin bowler and PWBA title holder
- Mitch Miller (1911–2010), musician and record producer; owned a house in Stony Point now inhabited by his daughter
- Eugene Palmer (1939–), fugitive
- Roy Pea (1952–), learning scientist, technology innovator, and Stanford University professor
- Katelyn Tuohy (2002–) Middle and long-distance runner. Four-time NCAA champion and holds the national women's high school mile record at 4:33.29.
- Stan Vanderbeek (1927–1984), independent filmmaker; built his Movie Drome theater in Stony Point
- General "Mad" Anthony Wayne (1745–1796), United States Army officer, statesman, member of United States House of Representatives, may have earned his nickname "Mad" at the Battle of Stony Point during the Revolutionary War
